= Speaker of the Parliament of Albania =

Presiding officer of the Parliament of Albania

Speaker of Parliament of Republic of Albania
- Kryetar i Kuvendit të Shqipërisë

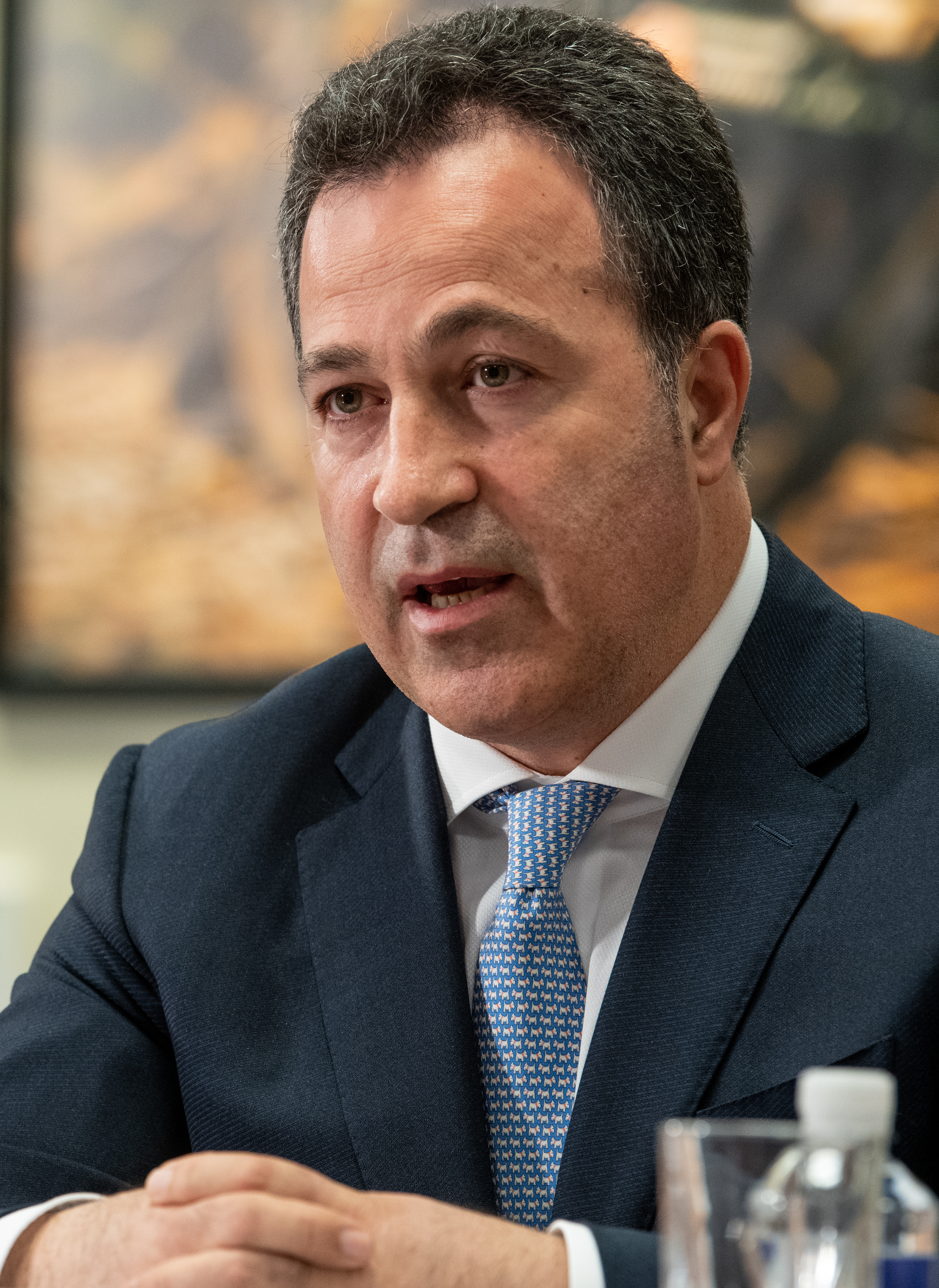
- Incumbent; Niko Peleshi since 12 September 2025
- Style: Her Excellency
- Appointer: Parliament
- Term length: Four years
- Inaugural holder: Xhemal Naipi
- Formation: 29 March 1920; 106 years ago
- Website: www.parlament.al

The speaker of the Parliament of Albania (Albanian: Kryetari i Kuvendit) is the presiding officer of the Parliament of Albania whose term coincides with the term of the Parliament and are elected by a vote during the opening session. The speaker takes over the functions of the office of president when the president is temporarily absent or unable to exercise the powers of the presidency. Since the first multi-party elections held after the collapse of the Communist rule, there have been nine speakers of the Parliament. As of 12 September 2025, the speaker of the Parliament is Niko Peleshi.

== Officeholders ==
=== Speaker ===
Speakers of the Assembly
No.	Portrait	Name	Term in office		Leg.
1st		Xhemal Naipi (1887–1955)	29 March 1920	27 May 1920	I
1st		Xhemal Naipi (1887–1955)	1 month and 28 days		I
2nd		Dhimitër Kacimbra (1875–1950)	25 September 1920	15 November 1920	I
2nd		Dhimitër Kacimbra (1875–1950)	1 month and 21 days		I
3rd		Pandeli Evangjeli (1859–1949)	9 May 1921	16 July 1921	II
3rd		Pandeli Evangjeli (1859–1949)	2 months and 7 days		II
4th		Eshref Frashëri (1874–1938)	16 July 1921	30 September 1923	II
4th		Eshref Frashëri (1874–1938)	2 months and 14 days		II
—		Eshref Frashëri (1874–1938)	21 January 1924	17 April 1924	III
—		Eshref Frashëri (1874–1938)	2 months and 27 days		III
5th		Petro Poga (1850–1944)	17 April 1924	2 March 1925	III
5th		Petro Poga (1850–1944)	9 months		III
—		Eshref Frashëri (1874–1938)	2 March 1925	24 September 1925	III, IV
—		Eshref Frashëri (1874–1938)	6 months and 22 days		III, IV
—		Pandeli Evangjeli (1859–1949)	24 September 1925	15 September 1926	IV
—		Pandeli Evangjeli (1859–1949)	11 months and 22 days		IV
6th		Kostaq Kotta (1889–1949)	15 September 1926	7 June 1928	IV
6th		Kostaq Kotta (1889–1949)	1 year, 8 months and 23 days		IV
—		Pandeli Evangjeli (1859–1949)	25 August 1928	5 March 1930	V
—		Pandeli Evangjeli (1859–1949)	1 year, 6 months and 8 days		V
—		Kostaq Kotta (1889–1949)	20 October 1930	10 February 1937	V, VI
—		Kostaq Kotta (1889–1949)	6 years, 3 months and 21 days		V, VI
—		Pandeli Evangjeli (1859–1949)	11 February 1937	12 April 1939	VII
—		Pandeli Evangjeli (1859–1949)	2 years, 2 months and 1 day		VII
7th		Terenc Toçi (1880–1945)	9 April 1940	23 November 1942	VIII, IX
7th		Terenc Toçi (1880–1945)	2 years, 7 months and 14 days		VIII, IX
8th		Ernest Koliqi (1903–1975)	23 November 1942	16 May 1943	IX
8th		Ernest Koliqi (1903–1975)	5 months and 23 days		IX
9th		Fejzi Alizoti (1874–1938)	16 May 1943	4 August 1943	IX
9th		Fejzi Alizoti (1874–1938)	2 months and 19 days		IX
10th		Lef Nosi (1877–1946)	18 October 1943	25 October 1943	X
10th		Lef Nosi (1877–1946)	7 days		X
11th		Idhomen Kosturi (1874–1938)	26 October 1943	5 November 1943	X
11th		Idhomen Kosturi (1874–1938)	10 days		X
12th		Mihal Zallari (1894–1976)	9 November 1943	14 September 1944	X
12th		Mihal Zallari (1894–1976)	10 months and 5 days		X
13th		Tuk Jakova (1914–1959)	10 January 1946	20 March 1946	XI
13th		Tuk Jakova (1914–1959)	2 months and 10 days		XI
14th		Ymer Dishnica (1912–1998)	25 March 1946	12 July 1947	XI
14th		Ymer Dishnica (1912–1998)	1 year, 3 months and 17 days		XI
15th		Manush Myftiu (1919–1997)	12 July 1947	28 June 1950	XI
15th		Manush Myftiu (1919–1997)	2 years, 11 months and 16 days		XI
16th		Teodor Heba (1914–2001)	28 June 1950	6 June 1951	XII
16th		Teodor Heba (1914–2001)	11 months and 9 days		XII
17th		Mihal Prifti (1918–1986)	6 June 1951	19 July 1954	XII
17th		Mihal Prifti (1918–1986)	3 years, 1 month and 13 days		XII
18th		Gogo Nushi (1913–1970)	19 July 1954	14 November 1956	XIII
18th		Gogo Nushi (1913–1970)	2 years, 3 months and 26 days		XIII
19th		Rita Marko (1920–2018)	14 November 1956	21 June 1958	XIII
19th		Rita Marko (1920–2018)	1 year, 7 months and 7 days		XIII
20th		Medar Shtylla (1907–1963)	21 June 1958	20 December 1963	XIV, XV
20th		Medar Shtylla (1907–1963)	5 years, 5 months and 29 days		XIV, XV
21st		Lefter Goga (1921–1997)	20 November 1964	10 September 1966	XV
21st		Lefter Goga (1921–1997)	1 year, 9 months and 21 days		XV
22nd		Abdyl Këllezi (1919–1977)	10 September 1966	13 January 1969	XVI
22nd		Abdyl Këllezi (1919–1977)	2 years, 4 months and 3 days		XVI
23rd		Behar Shtylla (1918–1994)	13 January 1969	20 November 1970	XVI
23rd		Behar Shtylla (1918–1994)	1 year, 10 months and 7 days		XVI
24th		Fadil Paçrami (1922–2008)	20 November 1970	25 September 1973	XVII
24th		Fadil Paçrami (1922–2008)	2 years, 10 months and 5 days		XVII
25th		Iliaz Reka (1924–1975)	25 September 1973	27 December 1975	XVII, XVIII
25th		Iliaz Reka (1924–1975)	2 years, 3 months and 2 days		XVII, XVIII
26th		Ali Manaj (born 1937)	11 February 1976	25 December 1978	XVIII
26th		Ali Manaj (born 1937)	2 years, 10 months and 14 days		XVIII
27th		Simon Stefani (1929–2000)	25 December 1978	22 November 1981	XIX
27th		Simon Stefani (1929–2000)	2 years, 10 months and 28 days		XIX
28th		Pali Miska (1931–2008)	22 November 1981	19 February 1987	XIX, XX
28th		Pali Miska (1931–2008)	5 years, 2 months and 28 days		XIX, XX
29th		Petro Dode (1924–?)	19 February 1987	17 April 1990	XXI
29th		Petro Dode (1924–?)	3 years, 1 month and 29 days		XXI
30th		Kastriot Islami (born 1952)	18 April 1990	6 April 1992	XXI, XXII
30th		Kastriot Islami (born 1952)	1 year, 11 months and 19 days		XXI, XXII
31st		Pjetër Arbnori (1936–2006)	6 April 1992	24 July 1997	XXIII, XXIV
31st		Pjetër Arbnori (1936–2006)	5 years, 3 months and 18 days		XXIII, XXIV
32nd		Skënder Gjinushi (born 1949)	24 July 1997	4 September 2001	XXV
32nd		Skënder Gjinushi (born 1949)	4 years, 1 month and 11 days		XXV
33rd		Namik Dokle (born 1946)	4 September 2001	30 April 2002	XXVI
33rd		Namik Dokle (born 1946)	7 months and 26 days		XXVI
34th		Servet Pëllumbi (1936–2026)	30 April 2002	3 September 2005	XXVI
34th		Servet Pëllumbi (1936–2026)	3 years, 4 months and 4 days		XXVI
35th		Jozefina Topalli (born 1963)	3 September 2005	10 September 2013	XXVII, XXVIII
35th		Jozefina Topalli (born 1963)	8 years and 7 days		XXVII, XXVIII
36th		Ilir Meta (born 1969)	10 September 2013	24 July 2017	XXIX
36th		Ilir Meta (born 1969)	3 years, 10 months and 14 days		XXIX
37th		Gramoz Ruçi (born 1951)	9 September 2017	10 September 2021	XXX
37th		Gramoz Ruçi (born 1951)	4 years and 1 day		XXX
38th		Lindita Nikolla (born 1965)	10 September 2021	26 July 2024	XXXI
38th		Lindita Nikolla (born 1965)	2 years, 10 months and 16 days		XXXI
39th		Elisa Spiropali (born 1983)	30 July 2024	12 September 2025	XXXI
39th		Elisa Spiropali (born 1983)	1 year, 1 month and 13 days		XXXI
40th		Niko Peleshi (born 1970)	12 September 2025	Incumbent	XXXII
40th		Niko Peleshi (born 1970)	11 months and 27 days		XXXII

=== Opening session presiding MPs ===
Opening session presiding MPs (Albanian: Deputeti/ja që drejtonë seancën hapëse) is traditionally the oldest elected member of a new legislature temporarily presides over the inaugural session. This member usually leads the proceedings until a permanent presiding officer is elected.

Date	Presiding MP	Age
27 March 1920	Mytesim Këlliçi	(53/54)
21 April 1921	Pandeli Evangjeli	(62)
21 January 1924	Petro Poga	(63/64)
1 June 1925	Jorgji Çako	(76/77)
25 August 1928	Pandeli Evangjeli	(69)
21 November 1932	Petro Poga	(71/72)
10 February 1937	Petro Poga	(76/77)
12 April 1939	Xhafer Ypi	(59)
17 April 1940	Terenc Toçi	(60)
16 October 1943	Lef Nosi	(66)
10 January 1946	Petraq Popa	(67)
28 June 1950	Petraq Popa	(72)
19 July 1954	Aleksandër Xhuvani	(74)
21 June 1958	Koço Tashko	(58)
14 July 1962	Spiro Moisiu	(62)
9 September 1966	Spiro Moisiu	(66)
20 November 1970	Spiro Moisiu	(70)
28 October 1974	Zylyftar Veleshnja	(72)
25 December 1978	Pilo Peristeri	(69)
22 November 1982	Shefqet Peçi	(76)
19 February 1987	Spiro Koleka	(78)
15 April 1991	Adil Çarçani	(69)
6 April 1992	Pjetër Arbnori	(57)
1 July 1996	Sabri Godo	(67)
23 July 1997	Dritëro Agolli	(66)
3 September 2001	Servet Pëllumbi	(65)
2 September 2005	Lufter Xhuveli	(64)
7 September 2009	Fatos Beja	(61)
9 September 2013	Namik Dokle	(67)
9 September 2017	Besnik Baraj	(61)
10 September 2021	Luljeta Bozo	(78)
12 September 2025	Vasil Llajo	(68)

== See also ==
- Politics of Albania
- Constitution of Albania
- Parliament of Albania
