= 2nd Legislature of Albania =

Second legislature of the Albanian state (1921–1923)

2nd Legislature of Albania Albanian: Legjislatura e 2-të e Shqipërisë
- National Council

Type
- Type: Unicameral of the Këshilli Kombëtar of Albania

History
- Founded: 21 April 1921
- Disbanded: 30 September 1923
- Preceded by: 1st Legislature
- Succeeded by: Constitutional Assembly

Leadership
- Chairman: Eshref Frashëri
- Seats: 78 (with substitutions and replacements during the term)

Meeting place
- Tirana

The 2nd Legislature of Albania (Albanian: Legjislatura e 2-të e Shqipërisë) was the second legislative term of the Albanian parliament, embodied in the National Council (Albanian: Këshilli Kombëtar). It was the first legislature elected by popular vote, following the elections of 1921, and it sat from 21 April 1921 to 30 September 1923, with its seat in Tirana.

== Background ==
The first National Council, established by the Congress of Lushnjë, held a temporary mandate. On 24 November 1920, eighteen of its members resigned and called for elections to a new parliament; the government approved holding elections, which took place on 21 April 1921, the first in the country's history.

The elections were held on an indirect, two-stage basis. In the first round, voting was restricted to men aged over 20, who elected one elector for each 500 registered voters. Four weeks later the electors assembled in the main town of each district to elect the 78 members of parliament. The Progressive Party led by Shefqet Vërlaci and the Popular Party led by Fan Noli and Luigj Gurakuqi won roughly equal numbers of seats, and the resulting factionalism produced several government crises during the term.

== Composition ==
The National Council elected in 1921 consisted of 78 deputies. The membership changed considerably over the course of the legislature: a number of deputies were unseated by the Council on 22 December 1921 (notably several representing Dibra); several were expelled in September 1922 for taking part in the uprising of 7 March 1922 against the government of Xhafer Ypi; others resigned, died, or were elevated to the High Council; and a group of deputies for the prefectures of Kosovo, Dibra, Korçë, Shkodër and elsewhere were admitted on 1 September 1922. Including all such changes, around 100 individuals served as deputies during the term.

The functions of Chairman of the National Council during this legislature were exercised by Eshref Frashëri.

=== Members ===
The list below reflects the deputies elected on 5 April 1921 together with the substitutions and replacements made during the legislature.

Members of the National Council, 1921–1923
No.	Member	Notes
1	Abdyl Sula	Admitted as deputy for Dibra on 1 September 1922; sworn in at the 36th session, 4 September 1922.
2	Agathokli Xhitomi	
3	Ahmet Hastopalli	
4	Ahmet Resuli	
5	Ahmet Zogu	On 2 December 1922 the National Council appointed him Prime Minister in place of Xhafer Ypi, who became a member of the High Council.
6	Ali Këlcyra	
7	Ali Koprëncka	
8	Anton Beça	
9	Fr. Gjergj Fishta	Sworn in at the 23rd session, 18 June 1921.
10	Avni Gjilani	Sworn in 11 May 1921; unseated by the Council on 22 December 1921.
11	Bahri Omari	
12	Bajram Fevziu	Resigned 6 February 1922.
13	Banush Hamdiu	
14	Bedri Pejani	Admitted as deputy for the prefecture of Kosovo on 1 September 1922; sworn in at the 36th session, 4 September 1922.
15	Bexhet Hyti	
16	Bektash Cakrani	
17	Dhimitër Kacimbra	
18	Eshref Frashëri	
19	Fan Noli	
20	Fazlli Frashëri	Admitted as deputy for the prefecture of Dibra on 1 September 1922; sworn in at the 66th session, 23 October 1922.
21	Fiqri Rusi	Admitted as deputy for the prefecture of Dibra on 1 September 1922; sworn in at the 36th session, 4 September 1922.
22	Gani Strazimiri	Unseated by the Council on 22 December 1921.
23	Halid Rroji	Sworn in at the 23rd session, 18 June 1921.
24	Halim Gostivari	Admitted as deputy for the prefecture of Kosovo on 1 September 1922; sworn in at the 36th session, 4 September 1922.
25	Hasan Prishtina	Unseated by the Council on 22 December 1921.
26	Haxhi Jusuf Banka	
27	Hilë Mosi	Sworn in at the 64th session, 22 October 1921.
28	Hoxha Kadri (Kadri Prishtina)	Sworn in 25 May 1921; unseated by the Council on 22 December 1921.
29	Hysen Vrioni	Sworn in at the 46th session, 10 September 1922.
30	Hysen Mushqeta	Took part in the uprising of 7 March 1922 and was convicted by the military courts of Shijak and Tirana; unseated by the Council on 18 September 1922.
31	Ibrahim Gjakova	Admitted as deputy for the prefecture of Kosovo on 1 September 1922; sworn in at the 36th session, 4 September 1922; resigned 17 June 1923.
32	Ibrahim Xhindi	
33	Iljaz Vrioni	Sworn in 25 May 1921; unseated by the Council, with other Dibra deputies, on 22 December 1921.
34	Irfan Ohri	Unseated by the Council on 22 December 1921.
35	Kapllan Delialliasi	Took part in the uprising of 7 March 1922 and was convicted by the military courts of Shijak and Tirana; unseated by the Council on 18 September 1922.
36	Koço Tasi	
37	Kolë Rodhe	Admitted as deputy for the prefecture of Korçë on 1 September 1922; sworn in at the 36th session, 4 September 1922.
38	Kolë Thaçi	Sworn in at the 23rd session, 18 June 1921.
39	Kristo Dako	Unseated by the Council on 22 December 1921.
40	Kristo Floqi	Sworn in at the 8th session, 11 May 1921.
41	Kristo Kirka	
42	Leonidha Frashëri	
43	Leonidha Koja	Took part in the uprising of 7 March 1922 and was convicted by the military courts of Shijak and Tirana; unseated by the Council on 18 September 1922.
44	Loni Kristo	
45	Luigj Gurakuqi	Sworn in at the 23rd session, 18 June 1921.
46	Llambi Goxhomani	Sworn in at the 8th session, 11 May 1921.
47	Maliq Bushati	Sworn in at the 23rd session, 18 June 1921.
48	Mazar Këlliçi	
49	Mehdi Frashëri	Sworn in at the 15th session, 25 May 1921.
50	Mehmet Pengili	Sworn in at the 15th session, 25 May 1921.
51	Mehmet Pilku	Admitted as deputy for the prefecture of Dibra on 1 September 1922; sworn in at the 40th session, 12 September 1922.
52	Mithat Frashëri	
53	Milto Tutulani	
54	Mustafa Kruja	Sworn in at the 23rd session, 18 June 1921; took part in the uprising of 7 March 1922 and was convicted by the military courts of Shijak and Tirana; unseated by the Council on 18 September 1922.
55	Mustafa Maksuti	
56	Ndoc Pistulli	Notified the Council by telegram on 27 June 1921 that he had resigned; elected to the High Council on 22 December 1921.
57	Ndre Mjeda	Sworn in at the 23rd session, 18 June 1921.
58	Nikolla Ivanaj	Admitted as deputy for the prefecture of Shkodër on 1 September 1922; sworn in at the 36th session, 4 September 1922.
59	Osman Haxhiu (Nuri)	
60	Osman Myderrizi	Sworn in at the 55th session, 7 October 1922.
61	Pandeli Cale	Died 5 August 1923 in Salonica; his death was announced to the Council on 20 August 1923 by Chairman Eshref Frashëri.
62	Pandeli Evangjeli	
63	Patuk Saraçi	Sworn in at the 23rd session, 18 June 1921.
64	Petro Harito	
65	Qamil Gjilani (Bala)	Admitted as deputy for the prefecture of Kosovo on 1 September 1922; sworn in at the 36th session, 4 September 1922.
66	Qazim Dani	Admitted as deputy for the prefecture of Kosovo in place of Mustafa Kruja on 1 September 1922; sworn in at the 81st session, 18 November 1922.
67	Qazim Koculi	Sworn in at the 60th session, 14 October 1922.
68	Qazim Kokoshi	Elected Mayor of Vlorë and resigned his seat on 6 September 1922.
69	Qemal Mullai	Sworn in at the 8th session, 11 May 1921.
70	Qemal Vrioni	
71	Ramiz Daci	Unseated by the Council on 22 December 1921.
72	Rasim Babameto	Admitted as deputy for the prefecture of Gjirokastër in place of Mithat Frashëri on 1 September 1922; sworn in at the 36th session, 4 September 1922.
73	Refik Topia	Sworn in at the 15th session, 25 May 1921; elected to the High Council on 24 December 1921.
74	Rexhep Jella	Elected deputy for the prefecture of Durrës on 30 January 1923 in place of Xhafer Ypi, who joined the High Council; sworn in at the session of 1 March 1923.
75	Rexhep Mati	Admitted as deputy for the prefecture of Dibra on 1 September 1922; sworn in at the 36th session, 4 September 1922.
76	Rexhep Mitrovica	Sworn in at the 23rd session, 18 June 1921.
77	Riza Dani	Sworn in at the 23rd session, 18 June 1921.
78	Salih Vuçiterni	Admitted as deputy for the prefecture of Dibra on 1 September 1922; on 6 September 1922 elected to the Commission for Administration and Army Affairs.
79	Said Toptani	Sworn in at the 23rd session, 18 June 1921.
80	Sejfi Vlamasi	
81	Selahydin Shkoza	
82	Skënder Pojani	
83	Sotir Peci	
84	Spiro Jorgo Koleka	
85	Spiro (Pilo) Papa	
86	Stavro Vinjau	
87	Sulejman Delvina	
88	Syrja Pojani	
89	Shahsivar Alltuni	
90	Shefqet Dajiu	
91	Shefqet Vërlaci	
92	Shuk Gurakuqi	
93	Shyqri Muftiu	
94	Taqi Buda	
95	Tefik Mborja	
96	Tefik Panariti	
97	Visarion Xhuvani	
98	Xhafer Ypi	Elected to the High Council during the term; succeeded in his Durrës seat by Rexhep Jella on 30 January 1923.
99	Xhemal Bushati	
100	Zija Toptani	

== Legislative activity ==
With this legislature the parliament began to function regularly as a body elected by the people, with clearly defined duties set out in the statute. The 1922 extension of the Statute of Lushnja—known as the statute of 1922—turned that act into a constitution holding the highest authority in the state and confirmed the fullness of parliamentary government. Under it, the legislature, now formally called the National Council, was the single legislative body, consisting of a chamber of deputies elected by the people through indirect voting.

Two political groups were clearly distinguished during this period: the Popular Party, headed by Fan Noli, and the Progressive Party, headed by Hoxhë Kadriu and Shefqet Vërlaci. The Council's legislative work focused on the law on judicial organisation, the development of the rules of procedure with new elements of transparency, the swearing-in of deputies before the Council, and similar matters.

== Dissolution ==
In September 1923 the National Council concluded its proceedings at the end of its two-year term in order to organise new elections for a Constitutional Assembly, which were held in December of that year.

== See also ==
- 1st Legislature of Albania
- 1921 Albanian parliamentary election
- Congress of Lushnjë
- Parliament of Albania
- History of Albania
