= 1st Legislature of Albania =

First legislature of the Albanian state (1920)

1st Legislature of Albania Albanian: Legjislatura e 1-rë e Shqipërisë
- National Council (Senate)

Type
- Type: Unicameral of the Këshilli Kombëtar of Albania

History
- Founded: 27 March 1920
- Disbanded: 20 December 1920
- Preceded by: None (first legislature)
- Succeeded by: 2nd Legislature

Leadership
- Chairman: Xhemal Naipi
- Seats: 37 (rising to 41 with substitutions)

Meeting place
- Tirana

The 1st Legislature of Albania (Albanian: Legjislatura e 1-rë e Shqipërisë) was the first legislative term of the Albanian parliament, embodied in the National Council (Albanian: Këshilli Kombëtar), also referred to as the Senate (Albanian: Senati). It was established by the Congress of Lushnjë and sat from 27 March 1920 to 20 December 1920, with its seat in the newly designated capital of Tirana. It is generally regarded as the beginning of the history of parliamentarism in Albania. The Council consisted of 37 members elected by the Congress, with Xhemal Naipi as its first chairman.

== Background ==
Following the end of World War I, Albania faced the threat of partition among its neighbours, as well as the military presence of mainly Italian and secondarily French forces and a pro-Italian government based in Durrës. Between 21 and 31 January 1920, Albanian political leaders convened the Congress of Lushnjë, which declared the Government of Durrës invalid and formed a new cabinet under Sulejman Delvina. The new state structure consisted of the High Council (Albanian: Këshilli i Lartë), a four-member regency acting as collective head of state, and the National Council, which functioned as the parliament.

The idea of an Albanian legislative body dated back to the Congress of Durrës of December 1918, which had envisaged a "Council of Elders" (Albanian: Pleqësia) functioning as a senate. However, due to internal divisions this body never convened, and the failure was among the reasons for the dismissal of the Government of Durrës in January 1920.

== Composition ==
The National Council consisted of 37 members elected directly by the delegates of the Congress of Lushnjë, and held a temporary mandate to last until general elections could be organised. Through substitutions and members sworn in at later sessions, a total of 41 individuals served during the term.

The Council met for the first time on 27 March 1920 in Tirana. The opening session was chaired by Mytesim Këlliçi until, through a vote, Xhemal Naipi was elected as the 1st Chairman of the National Council. Naipi exercised the functions of chairman from 29 March 1920 to 27 May 1920.

=== Members ===
Members of the National Council (Senate), 1920
No.	Member	Notes
1	Abdurahman Krosi (Mati)	Also known as "Abdurahim Mati" and "Abdurahman Salih".
2	Adem Gjinishi	
3	Adem Peqini	
4	Ahmet Resuli	
5	Bajram Curri	
6	Bektash Cakrani	
7	Beqir bej Rusi	
8	Dine Dibra	Also known as "Dine Maqellara".
9	Dine Dema	
10	Dhimitër Kacimbra	
11	Fazlli Frashëri	Elected deputy for Korçë on 30 March 1920 in place of Qani Dishnica; sworn in on 19 April 1920.
12	Gjergj Koleci	
13	Hafiz Sabri bej	
14	Halim Çela	Sworn in on 4 May 1920.
15	Hilë Mosi	
16	Hysen Vrioni	Sworn in on 1 April 1920.
17	Irfan Ohri	
18	Kiço Koçi	
19	Kolë Thaçi	Sworn in at the 46th session of the National Council, 25 September 1920.
20	Kostaq (Koço) Kota	
21	Llambi Goxhomani	
22	Myqerem Hamzaraj	
23	Mytesim Këlliçi	
24	Neki Ruli	
25	Osman Lita	Sworn in at the 37th session of the National Council, 18 May 1920.
26	Qani Dishnica	Resigned for health reasons.
27	Qazim Durmishi	Sworn in on 23 September 1920.
28	Qazim Koculi	
29	Ramiz Daci	
30	Rexhep Mitrovica	
31	Sadullah Tepelena	
32	Sejfi Vllamasi	
33	Spiro Jorgo Koleka	
34	Spiro (Pilo) Papa	
35	Shefqet Vërlaci	
36	Thimi Çikozi	
37	Veli Kruja	
38	Visarion Xhuvani	
39	Xhemal Naipi	
40	Xhemal Shkodra (Bushati)	
41	Ymer Shijaku	

== Legislative activity ==
Although the first Albanian legislature carried out its work over a short period, it passed several important laws. During this term the principles of parliamentarism were affirmed for the first time, including the appointment and dismissal of the government by the Council and the exercise of parliamentary control over it.

The most important act was the Statute of Lushnja, a constitutional law approved at the Congress of Lushnjë on 31 January 1920 and widely regarded as the first constitution of the Albanian state. Another significant measure was a new electoral law passed on 5 December 1920, which established an indirect electoral system with two rounds: in the first round, based on the administrative division of the districts of Albania, every 500 men would elect a delegate, who in the second round would help elect a total of 75 members of the National Council—roughly one member for every 12,000 eligible voters.

This electoral law paved the way for the creation of the first two Albanian political parties: the Popular Party (Albanian: Partia Popullore), led by Fan Noli, and the Progressive Party (Albanian: Partia Përparimtare), led by Hoxhë Kadriu and Shefqet Vërlaci.

== Dissolution ==
The legislative activity of the National Council ended on 20 December 1920, when the Council was dissolved to make way for the first elections in Albania, held on 21 April 1921. The succeeding legislature saw the country represented by 78 deputies.

== See also ==
- Congress of Lushnjë
- Parliament of Albania
- History of Albania
