= 4th Legislature of Albania =

Fourth legislature of the Albanian state (1925–1928), first of the Albanian Republic

4th Legislature of Albania Albanian: Legjislatura I e Republikës Shqiptare
- Parliament of the Albanian Republic

Type
- Type: Bicameral of the Senati dhe Dhoma e Deputetëve of Albania
- Houses: Senate; Chamber of Deputies

History
- Founded: 1 June 1925
- Disbanded: 7 June 1928
- Preceded by: Constitutional Assembly
- Succeeded by: Constitutional Assembly (1928)

Leadership
- President of the Senate: Pandeli Evangjeli
- President of the Chamber of Deputies: Koço Kota
- Seats: 18 senators (12 elected, 6 appointed) and 57 deputies

Meeting place
- Tirana

The 4th Legislature of Albania (Albanian: Legjislatura I e Republikës Shqiptare, "1st Legislature of the Albanian Republic") was the fourth legislative term of the Albanian parliament and the first of the Albanian Republic. It sat from 1 June 1925 to 7 June 1928 and was the only bicameral legislature in Albanian parliamentary history, consisting of a Senate (Albanian: Senati) and a Chamber of Deputies (Albanian: Dhoma e Deputetëve), with its seat in Tirana.

== Background ==
After the suppression of Fan Noli's government in late 1924, Ahmet Zogu reconvened parliament, which on 21 January 1925 proclaimed Albania a republic and on 31 January 1925 elected Zogu as the first President for a seven-year term. The Fundamental Statute, promulgated on 2 March 1925, established a parliamentary republic with a bicameral legislature.

Under the statute, legislative authority was vested in a Chamber of Deputies of 57 members and a Senate of 18 members, two-thirds of whom were elected by the public and one-third appointed by the president. The president was elected for a seven-year term by an absolute majority in a joint session of both chambers and held sweeping executive powers, including the right to appoint a third of the Senate and to rule by decree. The elections were held on an indirect basis in April and May 1925; as most opposition leaders had gone into exile, government candidates largely ran unopposed.

== Composition ==
The Senate had 18 members—12 elected by the Constitutional Assembly on 2 March 1925 and 6 appointed by President Zogu—while the Chamber of Deputies had 57 members elected on 17 May 1925. The membership of both chambers changed during the term through resignations, deaths, appointments to ministerial or diplomatic posts, and by-elections; the lists below reflect those changes. Pandeli Evangjeli served as President of the Senate and Koço Kota as President of the Chamber of Deputies.

=== Senators elected by the Constitutional Assembly ===
The following senators were elected by the Constitutional Assembly on 2 March 1925.

Elected senators
| No. | Senator | Notes |
|---|---|---|
| 1 | Eqrem Vlora | Absent from Senate sessions for two consecutive months; his seat was declared vacant by President of the Senate Pandeli Evangjeli on 5 May 1926. His death was announced to the Chamber of Deputies by Koço Kota on 26 March 1927. |
| 2 | Eshref Frashëri | |
| 3 | Hafiz Xhemali | Also recorded as Xhemal Mullai (Dibra). |
| 4 | Isuf Dibra | Replaced Eqrem Vlora on 18 December 1926; killed on 19 March 1927. |
| 5 | Nafiz Dervishi | |
| 6 | Pandeli Evangjeli | |
| 7 | Petro Harito | |
| 8 | Salih Vuçiterni | |
| 9 | Sami Vrioni | |
| 10 | Spiro (Pilo) Papa | |
| 11 | Shefqet Vërlaci | Sworn in at the 6th session of the Senate, 15 June 1925. |
| 12 | Shuk Serreqi | Sworn in at the 2nd session of the Senate, 4 June 1925. |
| 13 | Zija Toptani | |

=== Senators appointed by the president ===
The following senators were appointed by the president of the Republic, Ahmet Zogu.

Appointed senators
| No. | Senator | Notes |
|---|---|---|
| 1 | Abdurahman Dibra | Sworn in at the 2nd session, 4 June 1925; appointed Minister of the Interior on 31 October 1927. |
| 2 | Anton Beça | Sworn in at the 2nd session, 4 June 1925. |
| 3 | Gjon Çoba | Elected senator in place of Pjetër Deda on 26 April 1926; sworn in at the Senate session of 29 April 1926. |
| 4 | Halid Rroji | |
| 5 | Ibrahim Xhindi | |
| 6 | Isuf Gjinali | |
| 7 | Pjetër Shan Deda | Sworn in at the 2nd session, 4 June 1925; resigned in March 1926. |

=== Chamber of Deputies ===
The following deputies were elected on 17 May 1925. The list reflects the changes made during the legislature.

Members of the Chamber of Deputies, 1925–1928
| No. | Deputy | Notes |
|---|---|---|
| 1 | Abdurahman Salih | Also known as Abdurahman Mati. |
| 2 | Ahmet Hastopalli | |
| 3 | Arshi Halili (Xhindi) | Elected deputy for the prefecture of Vlorë on 15 April 1928 in place of Elmas Xhaferi. |
| 4 | Bahri Begolli | |
| 5 | Banush Hamdiu | Appointed Albanian state representative to Romania and resigned his seat on 20 May 1926. |
| 6 | Bexhet Hyti | Elected deputy for the prefecture of Elbasan in place of Kasem Sejdini on 21 July 1927; sworn in on 17 September 1927. |
| 7 | Bexhet Frashëri | |
| 8 | Ceno Kryeziu | Appointed Albanian state representative to Yugoslavia and later Czechoslovakia; killed by a student in Prague on 14 October 1927. |
| 9 | Elmas Xhaferi | Died in March 1928. |
| 10 | Fejzi Alizoti | Elected deputy for Gjirokastër on 14 April 1927. |
| 11 | Ferit Vokopola | |
| 12 | Fiqri Rusi | |
| 13 | Gjergj Çako | |
| 14 | Hajdar Blloshmi | Sworn in at the Chamber session of 10 November 1926. |
| 15 | Hamit Myftiu | |
| 16 | Hamit Toptani | Sworn in at the Chamber session of 28 April 1926. |
| 17 | Harallamb Papadhopulli | Sworn in on 22 October 1927. |
| 18 | Hasan Biçaku (Biçakçiu) | |
| 19 | Hasan Kryeziu | Elected deputy for Kosovo in place of Ceno Kryeziu; sworn in on 17 November 1926. |
| 20 | Hiqmet Delvina | |
| 21 | Hysen Vrioni | |
| 22 | Hysen Kuqi | |
| 23 | Hysni Toska | |
| 24 | Jak Koçi | Sworn in on 6 June 1925. |
| 25 | Jashar Erebara | |
| 26 | Javer Hurshiti | |
| 27 | Kasem Radovicka | |
| 28 | Kasem Sejdini | Appointed Commander-in-Chief of the Albanian Gendarmerie; his seat was declared vacant by Koço Kota, President of the Chamber, on 14 May 1927. |
| 29 | Kolë Mjeda | |
| 30 | Kolec Deda | |
| 31 | Kostaq (Koço) Kota | |
| 32 | Kristaq Kosturi | |
| 33 | Kristo Floqi | |
| 34 | Loni Llogori | |
| 35 | Dr. Loni Gjini | |
| 36 | Maliq Bushati | |
| 37 | Mark Kapedani (Gjomarkaj) | Elected deputy for the prefecture of Shkodër on 20 April 1927; sworn in on 2 May 1927. |
| 38 | Mihal Kaso | |
| 39 | Milto Tutulani | |
| 40 | Musa Juka | Elected deputy for the prefecture of Dibra on 25 February 1926; sworn in on 1 March 1926. |
| 41 | Myfit Libohova | Died in February 1927, aged 51. |
| 42 | Ndrekë Kiçi | |
| 43 | Petro Poga | |
| 44 | Prenk Llesh Gjoni | |
| 45 | Qani Dishnica | |
| 46 | Qazim Durmishi | |
| 47 | Qemal Karaosmani (Elbasani) | Elected deputy for the prefecture of Berat in place of Hysen Vrioni; both sworn in on 7 December 1925. A second oath was taken on 9 December after the credentials committee reported. |
| 48 | Qemal Vrioni | Submitted his resignation on 24 September 1925, accepted by the Chamber on 26 September 1925. |
| 49 | Rauf Fico | Sworn in on 20 June 1925; appointed Minister Plenipotentiary of the Albanian Republic to Turkey and resigned on 3 February 1926. |
| 50 | Rexhep Mati | Also recorded under the surname "Matja". |
| 51 | Sadik Shaska | |
| 52 | Said Kalaja | |
| 53 | Said Toptani | |
| 54 | Selahydin Blloshmi | |
| 55 | Simon Popa | Sworn in on 21 September 1925. |
| 56 | Simon Simonidhi | |
| 57 | Sokrat Voxhori | Also recorded under the surname "Vozhori". |
| 58 | Stavro Stavri | Appointed Albanian state representative to the Kingdom of Yugoslavia and resigned on 10 October 1925. |
| 59 | Sulejman Starova | Elected deputy for Korçë on 6 July 1926 in place of Banush Hamdiu; accepted by the Chamber on 27 September, while serving as Minister of Finance. |
| 60 | Syrja Pojani | |
| 61 | Shahsivar Alltuni | |
| 62 | Tef Gera | |
| 63 | Vasil Bamiha | Absent for two consecutive months; under Article 22 of the Fundamental Statute, declared automatically unseated at the 23rd session, 2 May 1927. |
| 64 | Vasil Rusi | Elected deputy for the prefecture of Durrës on 25 February 1926; sworn in on 1 March 1926. |
| 65 | Veis Sevrani | |
| 66 | Xhafer Ypi | Received the confidence of the Chamber as Minister of Education on 17 September 1927. |
| 67 | Xhelal Zogu | |
| 68 | Xhemil Dino | |
| 69 | Zenel Mandiqi | |

== Dissolution ==
The legislature sat until 7 June 1928. Later that year, following elections on 17 August 1928, a Constitutional Assembly of 58 members enshrined the monarchy as the form of government, and on 1 September 1928 Ahmet Zogu was proclaimed King Zog I, transforming the republic into the Albanian Kingdom.

== See also ==
- Albanian Republic (1925–1928)
- 1925 Albanian parliamentary election
- Constitution of Albania
- Parliament of Albania
- History of Albania
