= 9th Legislature of Albania =

Ninth legislature of the Albanian state (1940–1943), under Italian occupation

9th Legislature of Albania Albanian: Këshilli i Epërm Korporativ Fashist
- Supreme Fascist Corporative Council

Type
- Type: Appointed corporative chamber of the Këshilli i Epërm Korporativ Fashist of Kingdom of Albania in personal union with Italy

History
- Founded: 3 April 1940
- Disbanded: 4 August 1943
- Preceded by: 8th Legislature
- Succeeded by: National Assembly (1943)

Leadership
- President: Terenc Toçi

Structure
- Seats: Appointed members (see below)
- Political groups: Albanian Fascist Party

Meeting place
- Tirana

The 9th Legislature of Albania (Albanian: Këshilli i Epërm Korporativ Fashist, "Supreme Fascist Corporative Council") was the ninth legislative term of the Albanian legislature and the body that exercised nominal legislative authority during the Kingdom of Albania in personal union with Italy. It functioned from 3 April 1940 to 4 August 1943.

Following the Italian invasion of April 1939, Albania was re-established as a protectorate in personal union with the Kingdom of Italy under King Victor Emmanuel III, who was represented in Albania by an Italian lieutenant-governor. The legislature took the form of an appointed corporative chamber linked to the Albanian Fascist Party (PFSh), rather than an elected parliament. It was inaugurated in Tirana on 17 April 1940 in the former parliament hall, and was presided over by Terenc Toçi.

== Background ==
On 25 March 1939, Benito Mussolini issued King Zog I an ultimatum demanding acceptance of an Italian protectorate; Zog refused, and Italian forces invaded on 7 April and deposed him. The Italians re-established the Albanian state as a protectorate of the Kingdom of Italy. The Albanian Fascist Party was founded on 2 June 1939 as an affiliate of the Italian National Fascist Party, and was presented with an organised directorate and central council in March 1940.

The Supreme Fascist Corporative Council was established as the appointed legislative body of the regime. The leader of the Albanian Fascist Party was, by rule, a member of the Council of Ministers; this began with the party's first secretary, Tefik Mborja, and continued in subsequent governments until September 1943.

== Composition ==
The Council was constituted by decree of the lieutenant of King Victor Emmanuel of 8 April 1940 and was reconstituted by a decree of 18 April 1942. Its membership was drawn from the organs of the Albanian Fascist Party and the corporative economy and included both Albanian collaborators and Italian officials. The lists below reflect the changes made during the term.

=== Council constituted by the decree of 8 April 1940 ===
==== Central Council of the Albanian Fascist Party ====
Central Council of the Albanian Fascist Party
No.	Member	Role
1	Germano Secreti	Member
2	Fausto Cignolini	Secretary in reserve
3	Kolë Bibë Mirakaj	Member
4	Kostaq (Koço) Kota	Member
5	Muhtar Vrioni	Member
6	Nush Bushati	Member
7	Piero Parini	Inspector
8	Qazim Neki (Libohova)	Member
9	Selaudin Toto	Member
10	Tefik Mborja	Minister-secretary
11	Vangjel Koça	Member

==== Central Directorate of the Albanian Fascist Party ====
Central Directorate of the Albanian Fascist Party
No.	Member	Post
12	Aldo Egidio Brada	Federal inspector in Vlorë; replaced Eros Compagnoni Compagnucci on 8 July 1940.
13	Alush Lleshanaku	Federal secretary in Elbasan
14	Angelo Righini	Federal inspector in Shkodër
15	Carlo Castiglia	Federal inspector in Gjirokastër
16	Dilaver Tartari	Federal secretary in Kukës
17	Edoardo Bardozzo	Federal secretary in Berat
18	Enrico Chatelanat	Federal inspector in Korçë; until 31 October 1940.
19	Eros Compagnoni Compagnucci	Federal inspector in Vlorë; until 8 July 1940.
20	Eshref Frashëri	Federal secretary in Shkodër
21	Feridon Minarolli	Federal secretary in Tirana; replaced Nuri Dino on 15 May 1942.
22	Gianni Scotti	Inspector in Tirana
23	Giuseppe Girgenti	Federal inspector in Kukës; until 9 May 1941.
24	Gulielm Deda	Federal secretary in Korçë; until 13 July 1942.
25	Jup Kazazi	Federal secretary in Durrës
26	Luigi Zanoni	Federal inspector in Durrës
27	Llukë Bibi	Federal inspector in Peshkopi
28	Mark Temali	Federal secretary in Korçë; replaced Gulielm Deda on 13 July 1942.
29	Nuri Dino	Federal secretary in Tirana; until 15 May 1942.
30	Pandeli Gjika	Federal secretary in Gjirokastër
31	Pietro Almerigogna	Federal inspector in Kukës; replaced Giuseppe Girgenti on 9 May 1941.
32	Saverino Riccotini	Federal inspector in Elbasan; killed in Pejë on 25 March 1943.
33	Raffaele Breda	Federal inspector in Peshkopi
34	Tahir Zajmi	Federal secretary in Peshkopi
35	Vittorio Pietro Canepa	Federal inspector in Korçë; replaced Enrico Chatelanat on 31 October 1940.
36	Xhelal Shenepremte	Federal secretary in Kukës

==== Central Council of the Corporative Economy ====
Central Council of the Corporative Economy
No.	Member	Constituency / Notes
37	Aleko Bezhani	Vlorë
38	Ali Spahia	Kosovo
39	Anton Beça	
40	Asllan Merlika	Tirana
41	Ejëll Serreqi	Shkodër
42	Emanuel Nuçi	Korçë
43	Emin Toro	Gjirokastër
44	Enver Libohova	Gjirokastër
45	Ernest Koliqi	
46	Fiqiri Dine	Dibër; resigned on 3 December 1942.
47	Irfan Ohri	Peshkopi
48	Jak Koçi	Shkodër; until 6 July 1940.
49	Jaup Ypi	Korçë
50	Koço Harito	Porto-Edda (Sarandë)
51	Kristaq Kosturi	Korçë
52	Kristaq Zaguridha	Durrës
53	Maliq Bushati	
54	Mark Gjon Markaj	Shkodër
55	Nebil Dino	Tirana
56	Nush Topalli	Shkodër
57	Qemal Vrioni	
58	Sabaudin Toto	Gjirokastër
59	Sabri Panariti	Korçë
60	Sefa Vlora	Vlorë
61	Selim Mborja	Korçë
62	Spiro (Pilo) Papa	Fier
63	Shaqir Omari	Shkodër
64	Shefqet Dajiu	Elbasan
65	Shefqet Vërlaci	
66	Shyqri Myftiu	Elbasan
67	Terenc Toçi	Tirana
68	Veniamin Haxhijakovi	Elbasan
69	Vincenzo Rocco	Durrës
70	Xhafer Ypi	
71	Ymer Fortuzi	Tirana
72	Ymer Kopliku	Shkodër
73	Zef Boriçi	Shkodër; replaced Jak Koçi on 6 July 1940.

==== Other members ====
Other members
Member	Notes
Antonio Cerrito	From 11 December 1941.
Arturo Rocchi	From 11 December 1941.
Domenico di Tullio	From 11 December 1941.
Emidio Persico	From 11 December 1941.
Francesco Mattioli	From 11 December 1941.
Francesco Vania	From 11 December 1941.
Gino Delfino	From 11 December 1941.
Giuseppe Gasparro	From 11 December 1941.
Giuseppe Girgenti	From 11 December 1941.
Hilmi Leka	Member of the Central Directorate of the PFSh; from 12 May 1942.
Ibrahim Hoxha	Member of the Central Council of the Corporative Economy; from 10 May 1942.
Lutfi Spahiu	Federal of Peshkopi; from 26 June 1941.
Muharrem Vllamasi	Federal inspector; from 15 May 1942.
Nikolla Kote	Federal inspector
Pandi Frashëri	Federal secretary in Gjirokastër; from 15 May 1942.
Pasquale Lugini	From 11 December 1941.
Shaban Basha	Federal secretary in Pejë; from 15 May 1942.
Xhevat Kryeziu	Federal secretary in Dibër

=== Council constituted by the decree of 18 April 1942 ===
The Supreme Fascist Corporative Council appointed by the decree of 18 April 1942 convened on 11 May 1942 with the following composition.

Members appointed by the decree of 18 April 1942
No.	Member	Notes
1	Adem Dushi	
2	Agathokli Xhitomi	
3	Ahmet Ago Pasha	
4	Aqif Xhyheri	
5	Asllan Boletini	Until 13 October 1942.
6	Asllan Zeneli	
7	Avni Gjilani	
8	Azmi Ohri (Çoku)	
9	Beqir Rusi	
10	Beqir Valteri	
11	Beqir Velo	
12	Cafo Alibegaj (Ulqinaku)	
13	Dervish Xhemali	
14	Dhimitër Kacimbra	
15	Faik Babani	
16	Fuat Dibra	Resigned on 9 June 1942.
17	Gjon Fusha	
18	Haki Mulleti	
19	Halil Alia	
20	Hamdi Kërçiku	
21	Hilmi Dakli	
22	Ibrahim Biçakçiu	Did not accept.
23	Ibrahim Fehmija	
24	Ibrahim Hoxha	
25	Iliaz Gjinolli	
26	Ismail Gorani	Resigned on 4 July 1943.
27	Jak Vuksani	
28	Jakov Deliana	
29	Jusuf Agushi	
30	Kadri Myftiu	
31	Kadri Saliu	
32	Kasem Radovicka	Until 23 November 1942.
33	Kostandin Kallogjeri	
34	Kristaq Stati	
35	Lasgush Poradeci	
36	Mark Kakarriqi	
37	Mentor Çoku	Until 26 November 1942.
38	Mexhit Asllani	
39	Mihal Belkameni	
40	Milto Goxhomani	
41	Musa Demi	
42	Musa Sheshi	
43	Mustafa Dërguti	
44	Namik Resuli	
45	Ndoc Çoba	
46	Nikolla Haxhistasa	
47	Pal Lumezi	
48	Pasho Vërzhezha	
49	Pietro Maurea	
50	Qazim Bllaca	Served from 12 May to 27 October 1942, having been appointed Under-Secretary of the Albanian Fascist Party; replaced on 1 November 1942 by Sokol Dobroshi.
51	Reshit Haxhi Mehmeti	
52	Rosolino Petrotta	
53	Rrok Berisha	Died in April 1943.
54	Sabri Qyteza	
55	Sami Vrioni	
56	Selim Shabani	
57	Sokol Dobroshi	
58	Shaqir Curri	
59	Shaqir Halili	
60	Shaqir Prezja	
61	Shefik Kondi	Resigned on 9 June 1942.
62	Shuaip Kamberi	
63	Vehip Runa	
64	Xhelal Preveza	
65	Xhemal Belegu	
66	Xhevdet Mehqemeja	
67	Xhevat Begolli	
68	Ymer Rushdija	
69	Zenel Gjoleka	

==== Other members ====
Other members
Member	Notes
Ejëll Çoba	From 13 February 1943.
Fejzi Alizoti	From 16 May 1943.
Gaspër Ljarja	From 24 February 1943.
Kiço Koçi	From 14 January 1943.
Niko Çeça	From 3 July 1943.
Odhise Paskali	From 10 March 1943.
Sherif Mina	From 24 December 1942.
Zihni Hamzaraj	From 8 March 1943.

=== Federal secretaries appointed by the decree of 28 May 1942 ===
Federal secretaries appointed on 28 May 1942
Member	Post / Notes
Boger Gjelosh Luli	Elbasan, in place of Alush Lleshanaku
Ismail Haki Deveja	Shkodër; dismissed on 8 June 1943.
Mahmut Çela	Peshkopi
Reshit Merlika	Kukës

Selahudin Toto, Ejëll Serreqi, Spiro (Pilo) Papa, Qazim Bllaca, and Agathokli Xhitomi served as secretaries of the Council, which always had two secretaries.

== Dissolution ==
Following the Italian armistice with the Allies on 8 September 1943, Italian authority in Albania collapsed and the Albanian Fascist Party disintegrated. The Council ceased functioning, having last met in the summer of 1943; German occupation forces subsequently installed a more autonomous Albanian administration, and the legislature was reconstituted as a National Assembly (Albanian: Kuvendi Kombëtar).

== See also ==
- Italian protectorate of Albania (1939–1943)
- Albanian Fascist Party
- Albanian Kingdom (1939–1943)
- Parliament of Albania
- History of Albania
