= 1921 Albanian parliamentary election =

- 21 April 1921

All 78 seats in the Assembly 40 seats needed for a majority
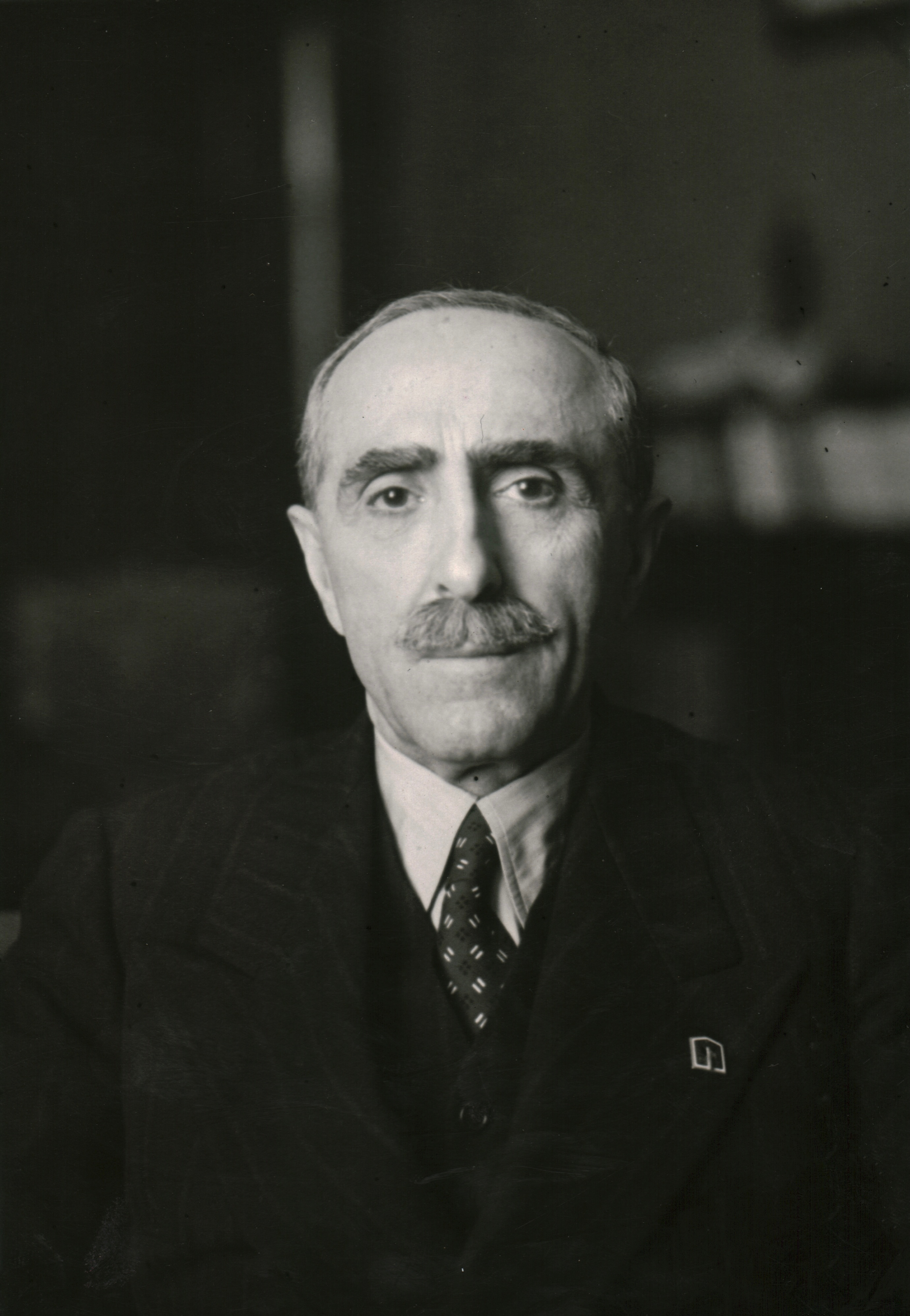

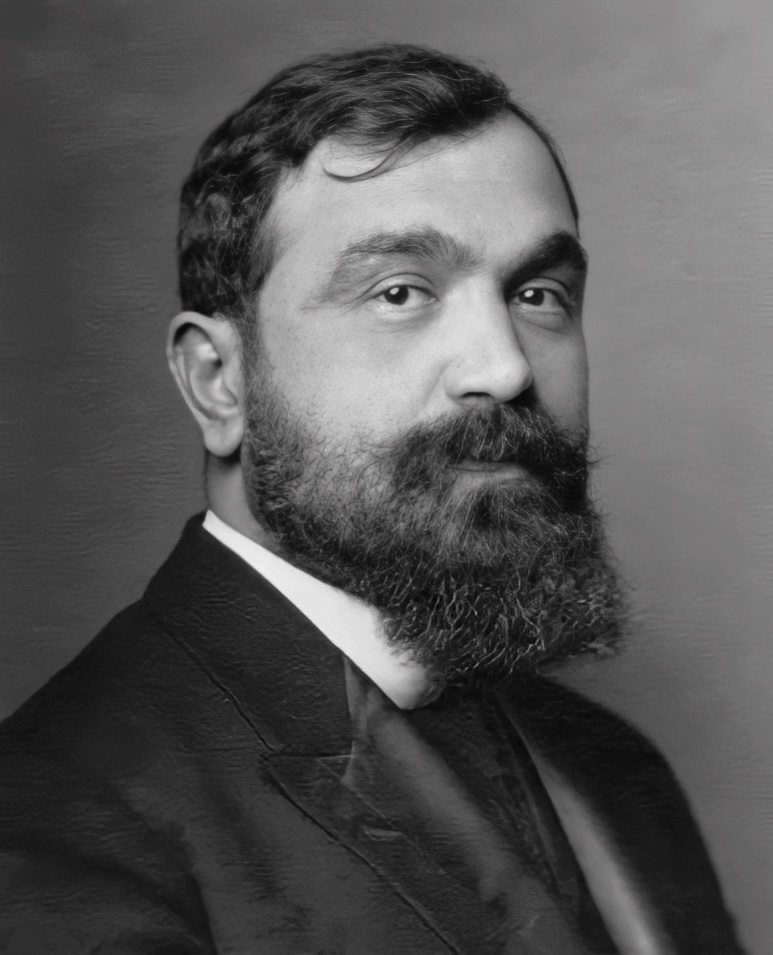
	First party	Second party
Leader	Shefqet Vërlaci	Fan Noli
Party	Progressive Party	Popular Party
Prime Minister before election
Ilias Vrioni
Independent
Prime Minister after election
Ilias Vrioni
Independent

Parliamentary elections were held in Albania on 21 April 1921, the first elections in the country's history.

== Background ==
Following a national congress in January 1920 a 37-member National Council was formed. On 24 November 1920, 18 members of the Council resigned and called for elections to a new parliament. The government subsequently approved the decision to hold elections on 14 December.

== Electoral system ==
The elections were held on an indirect, two-stage basis. In the first round, voting was restricted to men aged over 20, who elected one elector for each 500 registered voters by first-past-the-post voting. Four weeks later, the electors assembled in the main town of each district to elect the 78 members of parliament.

== Results ==
The Progressive Party led by Shefqet Vërlaci and Popular Party led by Fan Noli and Luigj Gurakuqi won around the same number of seats.

== Aftermath ==
Following the elections, a number of unstable factions were formed in the newly elected Parliament, resulting in several government crises. A new government was formed by incumbent Prime Minister Iliaz Vrioni in May, but he remained in office only until October, when he was replaced by Pandeli Evangjeli, who lasted less than two months. Evangjeli's successor Hasan Prishtina was in office for just five days, after which Idhomen Kosturi took over as Acting Prime Minister for 12 days before Xhafer Ypi succeeded him. In December 1922, Ahmet Zogu was able to form a stable government.
