= Manaj =

Manaj is an Albanian surname. Notable people with the surname include:

- Ali Manaj (born 1937), Albanian politician
- Arb Manaj (born 1998), Kosovan footballer
- Ramë Manaj (born 1954), Kosovan former politician
- Rey Manaj (born 1997), Albanian footballer

== See also ==
- Maraj
