= Simon Stefani =

Albanian politician (1929–2000)

27th Speaker of the Parliament of Albania
- In office 25 December 1978 – 22 November 1981
- Preceded by: Ali Manaj
- Succeeded by: Pali Miska

Personal details
- Born: 3 January 1929 Përmet, Albania
- Died: 2 August 2000 (aged 71)
- Party: Party of Labour of Albania
- Relatives: Andrea Stefani (son)

Simon Stefani (3 January 1929 - 2 August 2000) was an Albanian politician of the communist era. Stefani was born in Përmet. He served as Chairman of the Assembly of the Republic of Albania from 25 December 1978 to 22 November 1981, as well as member of the Central Committee of the Party of Labour of Albania from 1976 to 1991. Stefani was partly of Greek origin.
