= Mehdi Frashëri =

Albanian politician (1872–1963)

Mehdi Frashëri Bey
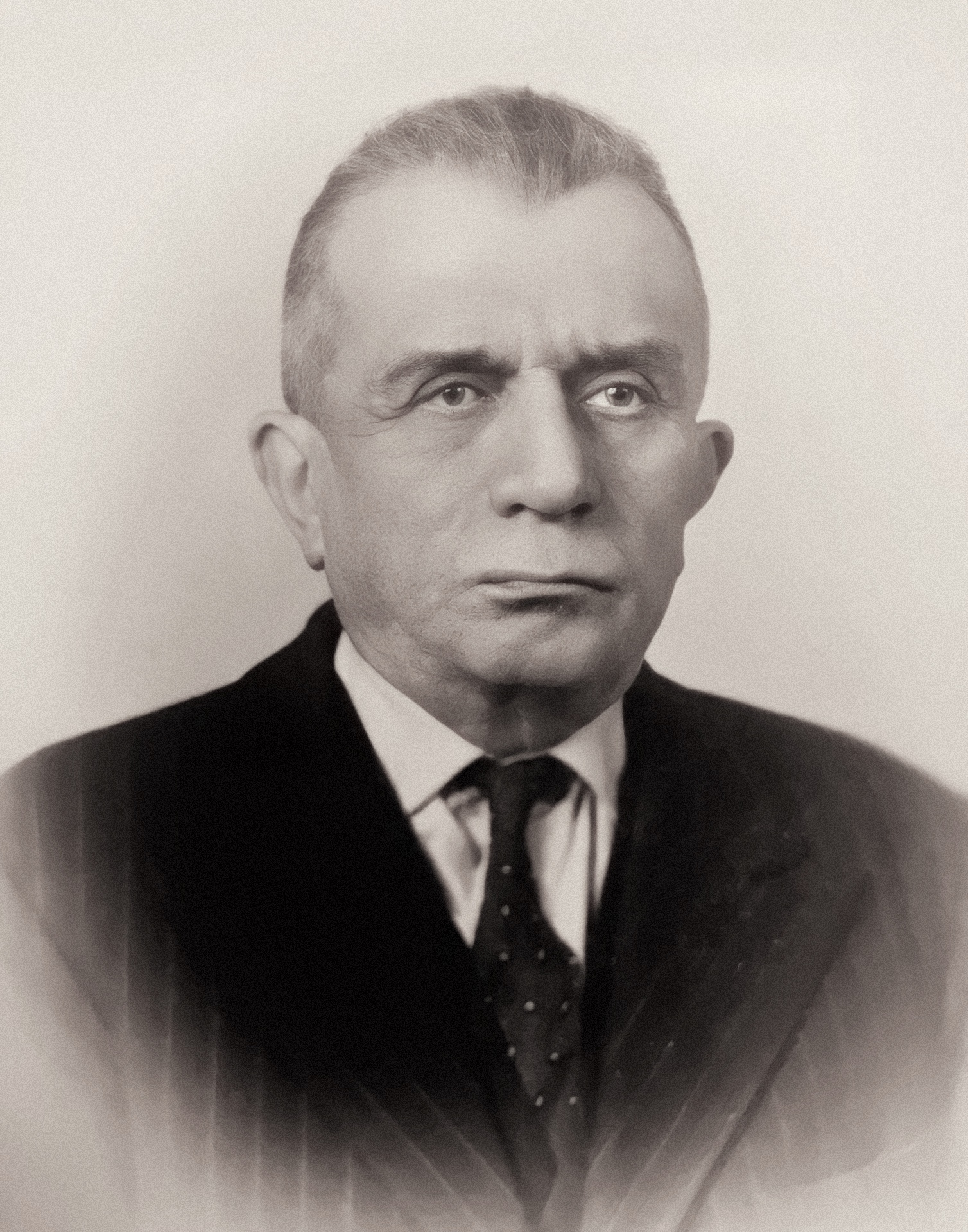

Chairman of the Provisional Administration Committee
- In office 24 October 1943 – 25 October 1944
- Preceded by: Ibrahim Biçakçiu
- Succeeded by: Office abolished

15th Prime Minister of Albania
- In office 21 October 1935 – 9 November 1936
- Monarch: Zog I
- Preceded by: Pandeli Evangjeli
- Succeeded by: Kostaq Kota

Personal details
- Born: 28 February 1872 Frashër, Ottoman Empire (modern-day Albania)
- Died: 25 May 1963 (aged 91) Rome, Italy
- Spouse: Nejre Frashëri
- Relations: Rakip Frashëri (father); Aishe Çaçi (mother)
- Children: Vehbi Frashëri; Mediha Frashëri; Ragip Frashëri; Shehriar Frashëri
- Occupation: Writer, Civil servant, Politician, Diplomat
- Profession: Politician, diplomat

Mehdi bey Frashëri (28 February 1872 – 25 May 1963) was an Albanian intellectual and politician. He served as Prime Minister of Albania in the 1930s and as Chairman of the Provisional Administration Committee in the Albanian puppet government under Nazi Germany.

== Biography ==
=== Early life ===
Mehdi Frashëri was born on 28 February 1872 in Frashër, Janina Vilayet, then Ottoman Empire. His father was Ragip bey kaymakam of Metsovo. Frashëri studied in Konica and Monastir and graduated from the Mekteb-i Mülkiye in Istanbul in 1897.

While in Istanbul, in 1901, he was charged with establishing a small press in a local house cellar for printing Albanian nationalistic materials together with a small group of Albanians.

=== Early political career and interwar period ===
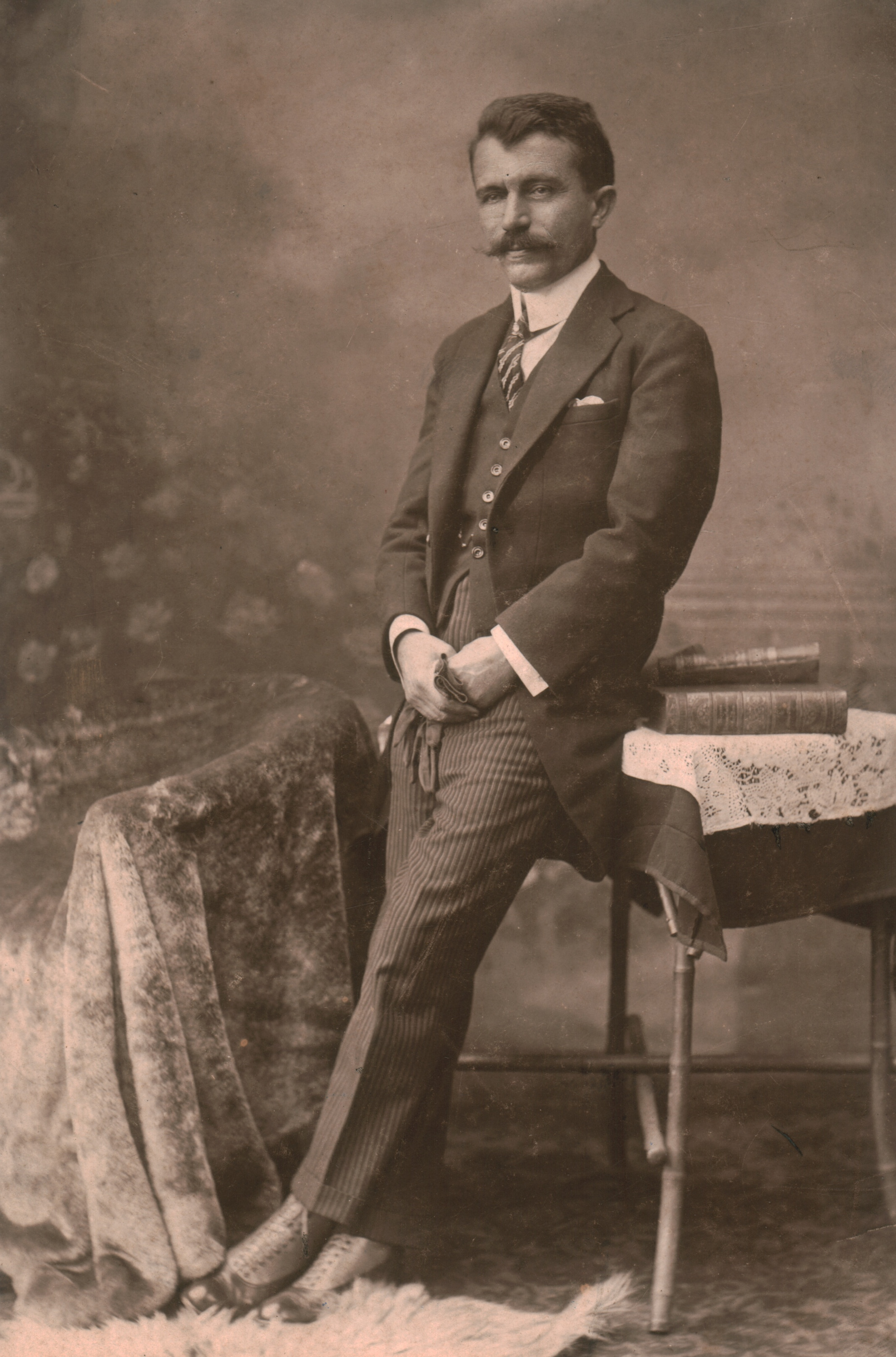
Frashëri in the 1910s.

Frashëri served as Kaymakam of Peqin in central Albania between 1901 and 1903. After that he moved to Ohrid, where he joined the Secret Committee for the Liberation of Albania. He was denounced by a group of local Muslims as an Albanian nationalist and a pro-Young Turk. He was governor of the Mutasarrifate of Jerusalem under the Ottomans, mayor of Durrës under Prince Wied, minister in the Albanian government of 1918, and minister of the interior in 1920. On May 17, 1914, as a member of the International Commission of Control he signed the Protocol of Corfu. He participated in the Congress of Durrës in December 1918. In 1923, he was also Albania's representative in the League of Nations. During the 1930s he held significant posts, including that of the Prime Minister from 1935 to 1936. In the early 1930s he participated in the civil code reforms committees along with Thoma Orologa and Hasan Dosti.

=== Italian occupation ===
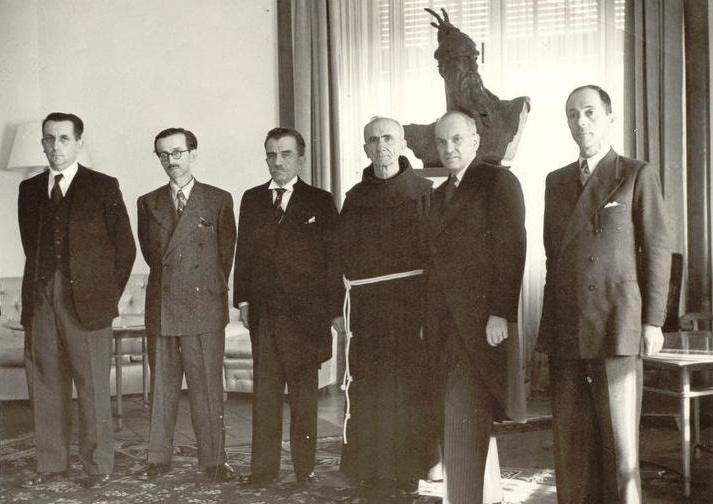
Members of the Albanian cabinet. From left to right, Fuad Dibra, Mihal Zallari, Mehdi Frashëri, Father Anton Harapi, Rexhep Mitrovica and Vehbi Frashëri

Frashëri was against Benito Mussolini and disliked his policy of invading Albania. Frasheri took it upon himself to broadcast scathing attacks against the invasion as well as addressing a remonstrance to Mussolini. Following the departure of the government of Tirana, he urged young men with revolvers to distribute themselves to preserve order. When the invading troops were at the gates he sought asylum in the Turkish Legation, continuing to refuse to sign a declaration in support of the Italians. His personal courage impressed even the German minister, who successfully appealed to Rome to allow Frashëri to return home. Despite Italian guarantees, Frashëri was soon arrested and interned in Italy.

Frashëri participated as "Honorary Chairman" of the Conference of Pezë, where Albanian anti-fascist factors gathered in 1942, a fact that would be suppressed by the communist regime later.

Frashëri, who had sympathy for the Germans partly because he had studied in Austria, worked with German minister Erich von Luckwald, in the hopes of establishing closer relations and to gain some protection for the Albanians from the Italians.

=== German occupation ===
After the capitulation of Italy, Nazi Germany took control of the Balkans. The Germans were apprised of his significance and began to search for him immediately after the invasion. Frasheri was found and agreed, on 16 September, to return to Tirana for talks with Hermann Neubacher, Major Franz von Scheiger and Martin Schliep. After the end of the meeting, it was agreed that Albania would have its own sovereignty under Nazi Germany, similar to the Independent State of Croatia.

Frashëri agreed to serve as regent as well as head the council. The leadership of the council was originally designed to rotate, but Lef Nosi declined for health reasons, and Anton Harapi argued that as a Catholic monk, he could accept no position in which he would be forced to sanction the death penalty.

=== After World War II ===
When the Partisans declared victory in Albania, the Germans evacuated, taking Mehdi Frashëri with them. Frashëri moved to Vienna and eventually settled in Rome, where he lived until his death.

Political offices
Preceded by Pandeli Evangjeli	Prime Minister of Albania; October 22, 1935–November 9, 1936	Succeeded by Koço Kota
Preceded by Ibrahim Biçakçiu	Chairman of the Provisional Administration Committee (under Nazi Germany); October 24, 1943–October 25, 1944	Succeeded by Position Abolished
