= Novoselë (disambiguation) =

Novoselë is a village and former municipality in Vlorë County, Albania

Novoselë may also refer to the following places in Albania:

- Benjë-Novoselë, a village in the municipality of Përmet, Gjirokastër County
- Novoselë, Kolonjë, a village in the municipality of Kolonjë, Korçë County
- Novoselë, Maliq, a village in the municipality of Maliq, Korçë County
