= Sejfi Vllamasi =

Albanian politician

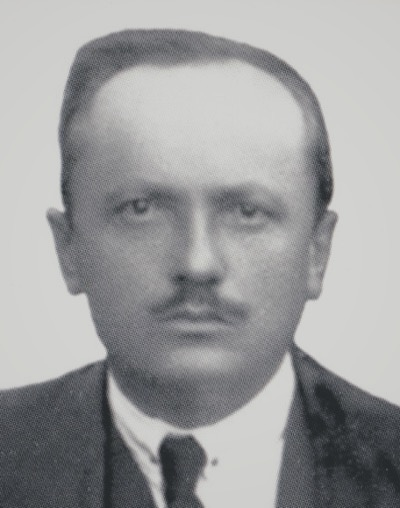
- Born: 1883; Novoselë, Kolonjë Vilayet of Janina, Ottoman Empire (modern Albania)
- Died: 1975 (aged 91–92)
- Occupations: Politician, veterinarian
- Known for: Committee of Kosovo; Albanian Populist Party

Sejfi Vllamasi (1883–1975) was an Albanian congressman and well-known politician during the first half of the 20th century. He was born in the village of Novoselë, in Kolonjë, Albania (at the time part of the Ottoman Empire).

Vllamasi studied in Istanbul, Turkey, to become a veterinary. His political activities started in 1905, as activist of the Secret Committee for the Liberation of Albania in Monastir. Vllamasi was one of the initiators of the Committee of Kosovo of 1918, founded in Shkoder. He was the initial leader of the Populist Party together with Pandeli Evangjeli and Eshref Frasheri. In April 1923 he was appointed Minister of Public Works. He took part in the June Revolution of 1924 to overthrow the rightist government. After the revolution was crushed, he migrated to Western Europe.

Vllamasi has been accused of participating in the anti-royalist movement during his exile in Vienna. He was a founding member of the "Bashkimi Kombetar" (National Union) organization, one of the organizations that collected many anti-Zog politicians in exile. Vllamasi was one of the organizers of the assassination attempt on Zogu in Vienna (1931). He was arrested by the Austrian police, released shortly after and deported from Austria. After that he moved to Paris along with most of the other diaspora activists.

During Nazi Germany's occupation, Vllamasi returned to Albania and became a member of the puppet government. He had an extremely difficult life during the communist rule of the Albanian Party of Labour, being imprisoned (1947–1956) and forced to work even in his old age.

Vllamasi's memoirs, titled Ballafaqime politike në Shqipëri (1899–1942) (Political Confrontations in Albania (1899–1942)), reveal him to be an open critic of other personalities like Luigj Gurakuqi and some of the Kosovar irredentists, and even the line of action followed by Noli and the opposition of the early 1920s . His memoirs are a vast source of information on the politics of early 20th-century Albania and on many Albanian personalities of that time.

== Further ==
- Vllamasi, Sejfi. Ballafaqime politike në Shqipëri (1897–1942) : kujtime dhe vlerësime historike, editor Verli, Marenglen. Publisher: Shtëpia Botuese "Neraida", Tirana, 1995. ISBN 9992771313.
