= Ali Manaj =

Albanian politician

26th Speaker of the Parliament of Albania
- In office 11 February 1976 – 25 December 1978
- Preceded by: Iliaz Reka
- Succeeded by: Simon Stefani

Personal details
- Born: 7 November 1937 (age 87); Damës, Gjirokastër, Albanian Kingdom
- Political party: Party of Labour of Albania

Ali Manaj (born November 7, 1937, in Damës, Gjirokastër) is an Albanian politician. He served as Chairman of the Assembly of the Republic of Albania from February 11, 1976, to December 25, 1978.
