= 28th Kuvendi =

Twenty-eighth Legislature of Albania Legjislatura e njëzet e tetë e Shqipërisë
- XXVIII Legislature; VII Pluralist Legislature

Type
- Type: Unicameral
- Term limits: Four years

History
- Founded: September 7, 2009
- Disbanded: May 25, 2013
- Preceded by: 27th Legislature
- Succeeded by: 29th Legislature

Leadership
- Speaker of the Parliament: Jozefina Topalli, PD
- Prime Minister: Sali Berisha

Structure
- Seats: 140 deputies
- Political groups: Government (74): PD (68); LSI (4); PR (1); PDI (1); Opposition (66): PS (65); PBDNJ (1)

Elections
- Last election: 28 June 2009

Website
- www.parlament.al

The Twenty-eighth Legislature of Albania (Albanian: Legjislatura e njëzet e tetë), officially known as the VII Pluralist Legislature of Albania (Albanian: Legjislatura e VII Pluraliste e Shqipërisë), was the legislature of Albania following the 2009 Albanian Parliamentary election of Members of Parliament (MPs) to the Albanian Parliament. The party of the Prime Minister Sali Berisha, PD, obtained majority of 74 deputies.

== 28th Legislature ==
The two largest political parties in Albania are the Democratic Party (PD) and the Socialist Party (PS). Following is a list of political parties and alliances with representation in the Parliament by the June 2009 elections:

Name	Abbr.	Founded	Leader	Ideology	MPs
Democratic Party of Albania Partia Demokratike e Shqipërisë	PD	1990	Sali Berisha	Liberal conservatism, Conservatism, Centre-right	68 / 140
Socialist Party of Albania Partia Socialiste e Shqipërisë	PS	1991	Edi Rama	Social democracy, Centre-left	65 / 140
Socialist Movement for Integration Lëvizja Socialiste për Integrim	LSI	2004	Ilir Meta	Social democracy, Centre-left	4 / 140
Republican Party of Albania Partia Republikane e Shqipërisë	PR	1991	Fatmir Mediu	National conservatism, Social conservatism, Right Wing	1 / 140
Party for Justice and Integration Partia për Drejtësi dhe Integrim,	PDI	2004	Tahir Muhedini	Cham issue, Centre-right	1 / 140
Unity for Human Rights Party Partia Bashkimi për të Drejtat e Njeriut	PBDNJ	1992	Vangjel Dule	Social Liberalism, Greek minority interests, Centre	1 / 140
