= Mihal Zallari =

Albanian historian, politician, journalist and poet

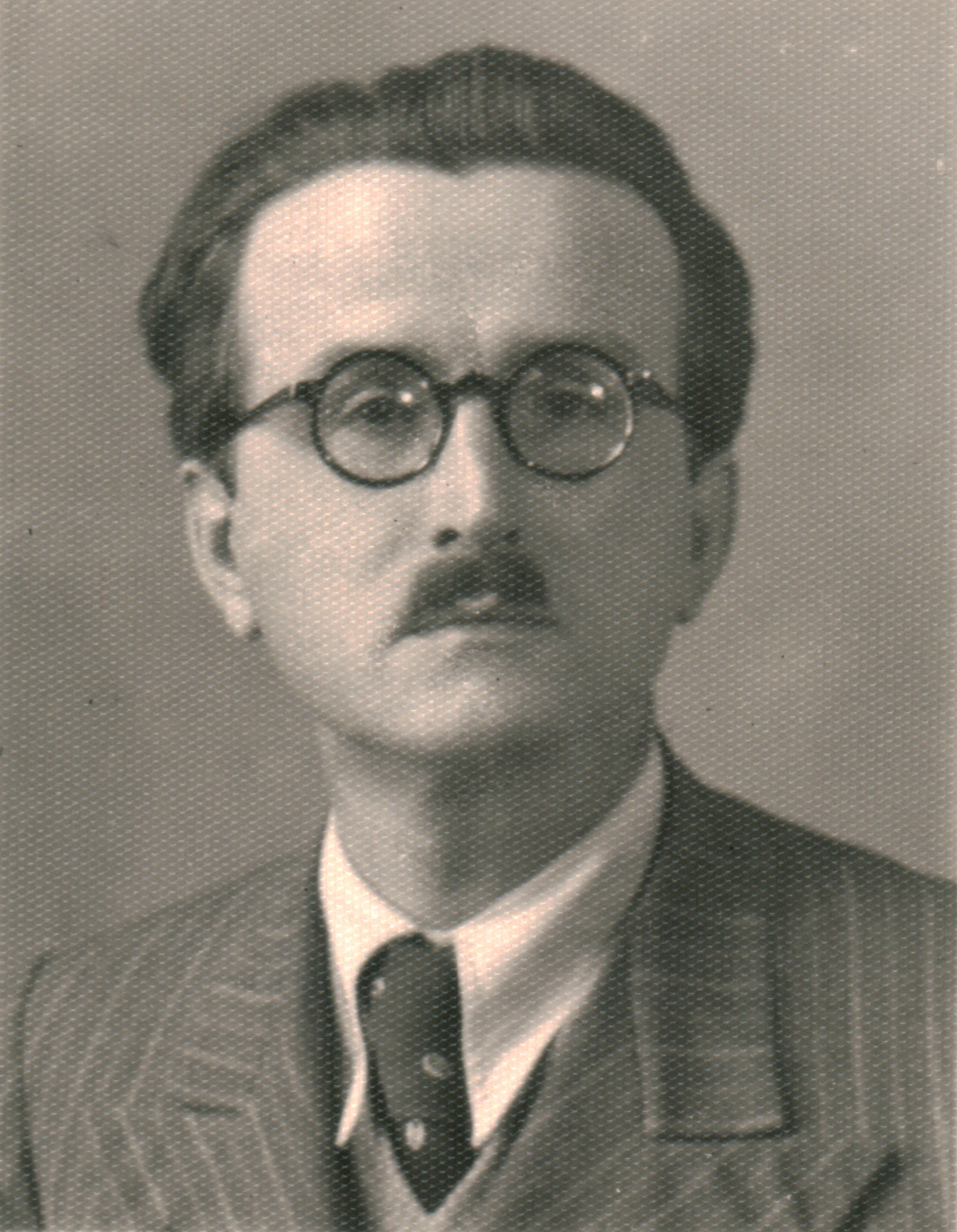
- Zallari in 1944

12th Speaker of the Parliament of Albania
- In office 9 November 1943 – November 1944

Deputy of Gjirokastër
- In office 16 October 1943 – November 1944

Personal details
- Born: 25 September 1894 Frashër, Gjirokastër County, Ottoman Albania
- Died: 17 March 1976 (aged 81) Albania

Mihal Zallari (25 September 1894 – 17 March 1976) was an Albanian historian, politician, journalist and poet. He served as Chairman of the National Parliament of Albania from 1943 to 1944.

== Life ==
Born in Frashër on 25 September 1894, he hailed from the Zallari family, a branch of the Frashëri family. Zallari studied at the German school of Istanbul and later political science at the University of Vienna. His brother Leonidha Frashëri-Zallari, a collaborator of Mit'hat Frashëri, was a deputy of the Albanian parliament as a representative of Gjirokastër in 1921–23 and 1943–44 and had also served as prefect of Delvinë.

In 1943 as a deputy of Gjirokastër he became a member of the executive committee of the assembly of the State of Albania and a chairman of the assembly on 9 November four days after the previous chairman Idhomene Kosturi was assassinated in Durrës. In 1944 Zallari intervened in the case of the employees of the state radio of Tirana, who were to be arrested and executed by the German military authorities, which suspected them as Communists, and prevented their arrest. During that period along with other members of the government he was granting Jewish refugees in Albania identification and citizenship as ethnic Albanians in order to prevent their arrest and deportation. These activities had a significant effect in his trial after the war, in which Zallari was sentenced to thirty years in prison. He was released in 1962 and died on 17 March 1976, aged 81.

== Ideology ==
Throughout his life Zallari was a nationalist and a Germanophile. Zallari viewed imperialism and internationalism as two synonymous views, which represented the extreme opposite of nationalism. He further divided internationalism/imperialism into two forms: secular and religious.
