= Andon Beça =

Albanian politician

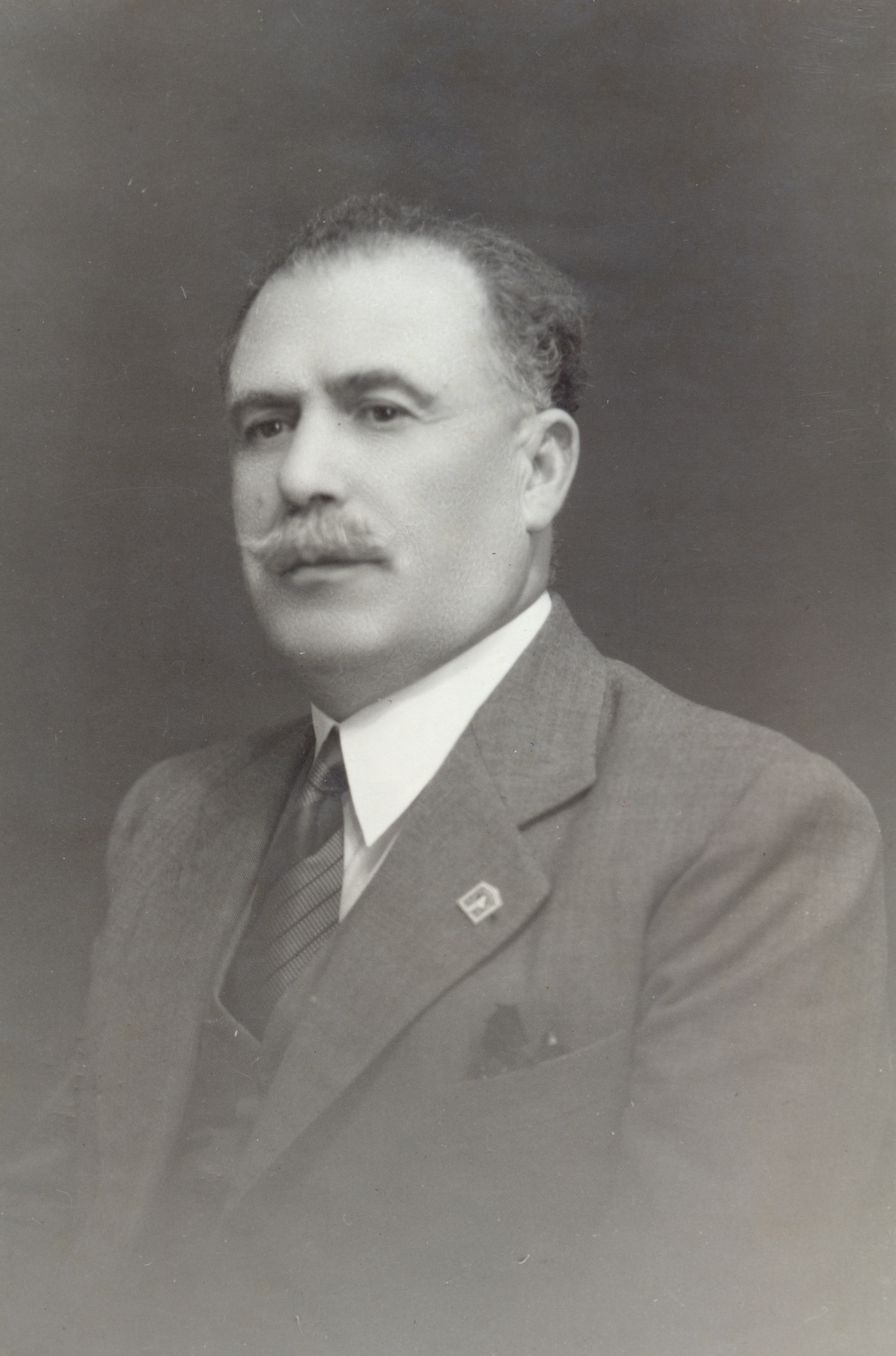

Minister of Agriculture
- In office 21 April 1939 – 3 September 1941

Personal details
- Born: 7 September 1879 Elbasan, Ottoman Empire (today Albania)
- Died: 31 October 1944 (aged 65) Tirana, Albania

Andon Beça (7 September 1879– 31 October 1944) was an Albanian politician.

Under the Italian occupation of Albania during World War II he was Minister of Agriculture and Domestic Economy in Shefqet Vërlaci's government which started functioning on 12 April 1939, and Minister of Finances in 1943. Beça was a loyal hanger-on of Vërlaci and was injured during an attempt on Vërlaci's life in 1927, inspired by his enemy, Zog. As a deputy of the electoral zone of Elbasan, he raised the cry "Long Life Italy" at the opening of the Albanian Parliament, on 15 October 1938, evoking no response from the audience. Beça had a son, who was sentenced by Enver Hoxha, and died in prison. He also had adopted his late brother's infant daughters, Haretina Beça and Maria Beça. Andon Beça owned a lot of real estate, including riverside properties and estates in several cities.
