= Novoselë, Kolonjë =

Novoselë
- Administrative unit
- Location within Albania
- Coordinates: 40°19′N 20°31′E
- Country: Albania
- County: Korçë
- Municipality: Kolonjë

Population (2011)
  - Administrative unit: 355
- Time zone: UTC+1 (CET)
  - Summer (DST): UTC+2 (CEST)
- Postal Code: 7405
- Area Code: (0)871

Novoselë (also: Piskal-Novoselë) is a village and a former municipality in the Korçë County, southeastern Albania. At the 2015 local government reform it became a subdivision of the municipality Kolonjë. The population at the 2011 census was 355 and the population was 100% Albanian in ethnicity, having the Tosk dialect of the Albanian language.

The municipal unit consists of the villages Novoselë, Mesiçkë, Kagjinas, Zharkan, Piskal, Vitisht, Shijan, Kaduç, Ndërrmarr and Mbreshtan. The etymology of the village comes from Slavic languages meaning new village, Novo Selo. In Albanian it turned into Novoselë, the village may have been named by Slavic peoples which have invaded this part of Albania and created a new village here, which explains the etymology.

== Notable people ==
- Sejfi Vllamasi, politician
