= Xhemal Naipi =

Albanian mufti and politician

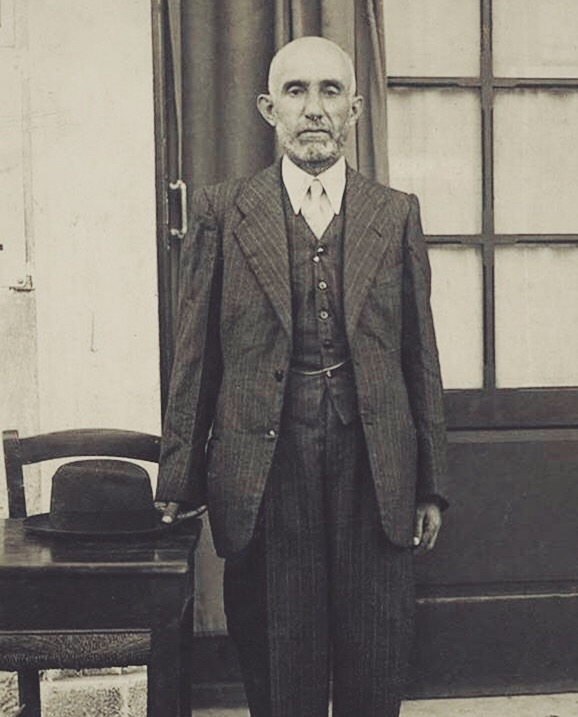
- Xhemal Naipi

1st Speaker of the Parliament of Albania
- In office 29 March 1920 – 27 May 1920
- Succeeded by: Dhimitër Kacimbra

Personal details
- Born: March 1, 1889; Shkodër, Ottoman Empire
- Died: 1955 (aged 65–66); Burrel Prison, People's Socialist Republic of Albania

Xhemal Naipi (1 March 1889 – 1955) was an Albanian mufti and politician. He served as Chairman of the National Council of Albania in 1920. He was awarded posthumously the Order "For Patriotic Activities Class I" as well as the "Torch of Democracy" Medal.

== Early life ==
Xhemal Naipi was born on March 1, 1889, in Shkodër, center of a vilayet of the Ottoman Empire, now a city in northwestern Albania. His father Hasan derived from the Naipi family, mentioned in the city for practicing the role of qadis during the Ottoman years. He finished his early schooling in his hometown and later pursued his university studies in Istanbul, majoring in theology and jurisprudence. He spoke fluently Arabic, Turkish, Italian and French.

In the years between 1913 and 1916, Naipi served as a qadi as well as Chairman of the Education Commission of Shkodër where he contributed in the opening of three elementary schools. Later he was elected as general director of Waqfs.

== Political career ==
From 29 March 1920 to 27 May 1920 he exercised the functions of the Chairman of the National Council, that was formed after the Congress of Lushnjë. He was elected to represent Shkodër in the 7th Legislature. On the onset of WWII, after the Italian invasion, Naipi was arrested by the fascist authorities and interned to Ceresara, Mantova where he was held until 1942. After his return to Albania, he became involved in the Legality Movement which aimed to restore the Monarchy. When the communists prevailed in the war and took charge of the country's administration, Naipi went into hiding. During the period between 1945 and 1946, his properties and possessions were confiscated and his family was interned to Berat. Following an amnesty issued by the communist authorities, he surrendered himself but later on October 7, 1946, was arrested. He was charged for participating in an organization that conducted illegal activities against the state. On June 23, 1947, the military court of Shkodër sentenced him to life imprisonment with forced labor, the loss of civil and political rights and seizure of his properties. Naipi died at the Burrel Prison in 1955.
