= Mytesim Këlliçi =

Albanian mufti, qadi, and senator

Mytesim Efendi Këlliçi or Këllëçi (1866-1924) was a mufti, qadi, and Senator in the Parliament of Albania (then known as the National Council) from March 27 to December 20, 1920.

== Biography ==
He was born to a family in Tirana. His brothers were Myslym and Masar Kelliçi, while his sister Nailja was the mother of Qazim Mulleti.

He studied theology in Istanbul and became mufti of Kavajë upon his graduation in August 1912. He accepted Hasan Prishtina’s fourteen points in favor of autonomy from the Ottoman Empire when the latter presented them in Skopje that month. He raised the Flag of Albania in Kavajë soon after.

At the Congress of Lushnjë, he represented Durrës, Kavajë, and Tirana.
