= Secret Committee for the Liberation of Albania =

The Secret Committee for the Liberation of Albania (Albanian: Komiteti i fshehtë për lirinë e Shqipërisë) was a secret committee founded in Manastir (modern day Bitola) by Bajo Topulli and other Albanian nationalists in November 1905 to fight for the secession of Albania from the Ottoman Empire. This committee was soon followed by many other similar committees in southern Albania, and aimed at overthrowing the Ottoman rule.

The committee was formed mainly by Albanian intellectual figures and had branches throughout the Albanian lands. On 5 May 1907, a branch of the committee was established in Bucharest, Romania, with the engagement of the Albanian Colony there. The Romanian branch was called "Committee of Albanians for the Freedom of Albania" (Albanian: Komitet i shqipëtarëve për lirin e Shqipërisë) and included beside Topulli even Kristo Meksi, Pandeli Evangjeli, Vasil Zografi, and Veli Këlcyra.

== See also ==
- Secret society
