= Kostaq Kotta =

Albanian politician and prime minister (1886–1947)

Koço Kotta
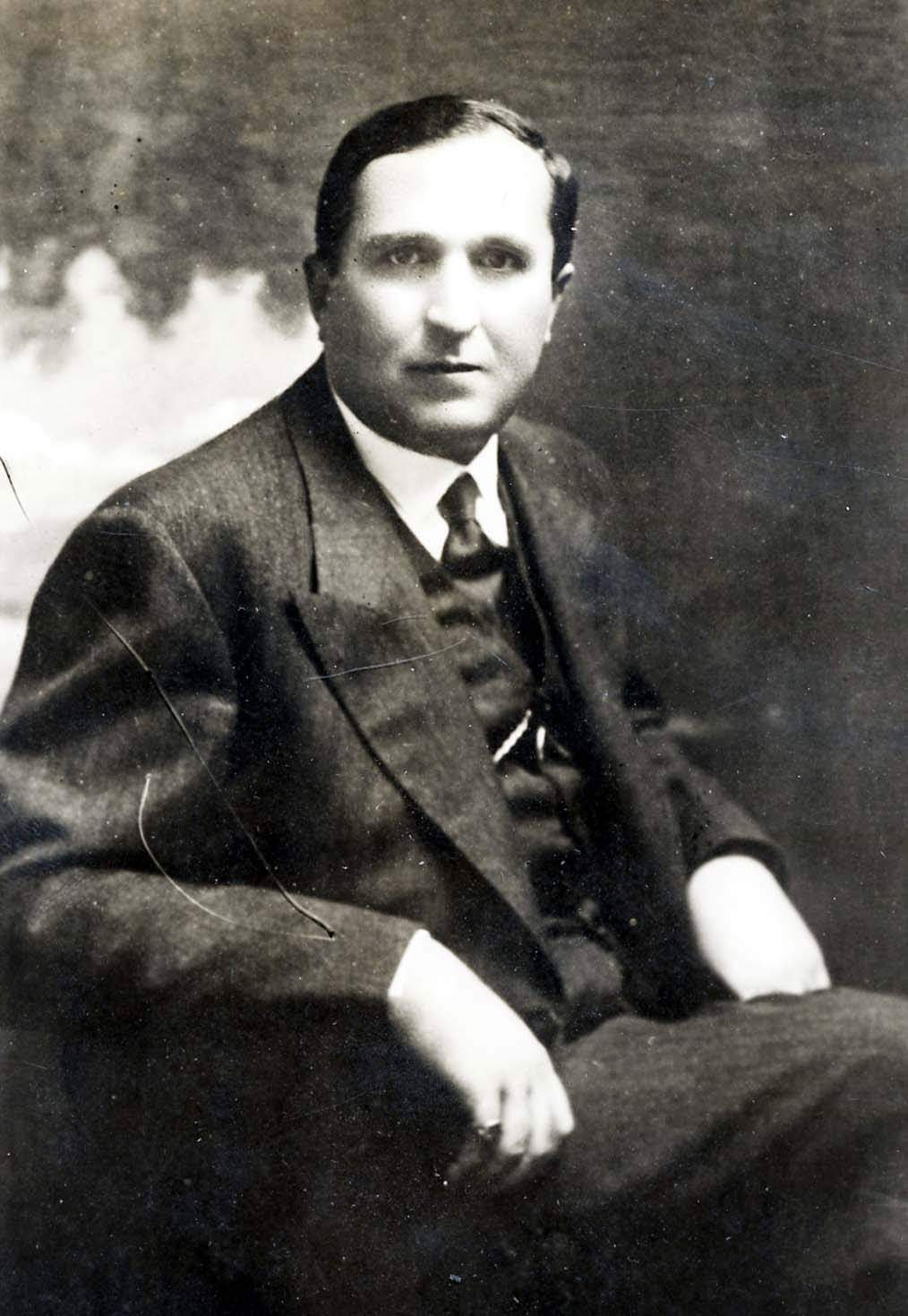

Prime Minister of Albania
- In office November 9, 1936 – April 8, 1939
- Monarch: Zog I
- Preceded by: Mehdi Frashëri
- Succeeded by: Shefqet Vërlaci
- In office September 5, 1928 – March 5, 1930
- Monarch: Zog I
- Preceded by: Ahmet Zogu
- Succeeded by: Pandeli Evangjeli

Personal details
- Born: May 5, 1886 Korçë, Manastir Vilayet, Ottoman Empire (modern-day Albania)
- Died: September 1, 1947 (aged 61) Burrel Prison, Burrel, PR Albania
- Children: Nuçi Kotta

Kostaq Kotta, also known as Koço Kotta (May 5, 1886 – September 1, 1947), was an Albanian politician and twice prime minister during the reign of King Zog I, who took a pro-Italian right-wing stance.

== Biography ==
He was educated in Greece and Italy. In the Principality of Albania, he served as the minister of public works and was elected to the Parliament of Albania. During the June Revolution of Fan Noli, Kotta escaped to Greece, but returned to lead the insurgency against Noli that led to the formation of the Albanian Republic under Ahmet Zogu.

He became the speaker of the parliament during Zogu’s presidency and then Prime Minister after Zogu established the Albanian Kingdom. During his first term, he introduced civil code laws based on the Napoleonic model.

In 1936, he headed the government again until resigning after the Italian invasion of Albania. He was a member of Mustafa Merlika-Kruja's cabinet in 1941.

He accompanied Zog into exile in Greece. In December 1944 he was captured by Greek Communists and returned to Albania. He was sentenced to lifelong imprisonment by the Albanian Communists's Special Court of Spring 1945. He died in Burrel Prison in 1947 as a result of torture.

== See also ==
- History of Albania

Political offices
Preceded by Ahmet Zogu	Prime Minister of Albania; September 10, 1928 – March 5, 1930	Succeeded by Pandeli Evangjeli
Preceded by Mehdi Bej Frashëri	Prime Minister of Albania; November 9, 1936 – April 8, 1939	Succeeded by Shefqet Bej Vërlaci
