= Eshref Frashëri =

Albanian politician (1874–1938)

Eshref Bey Frashëri
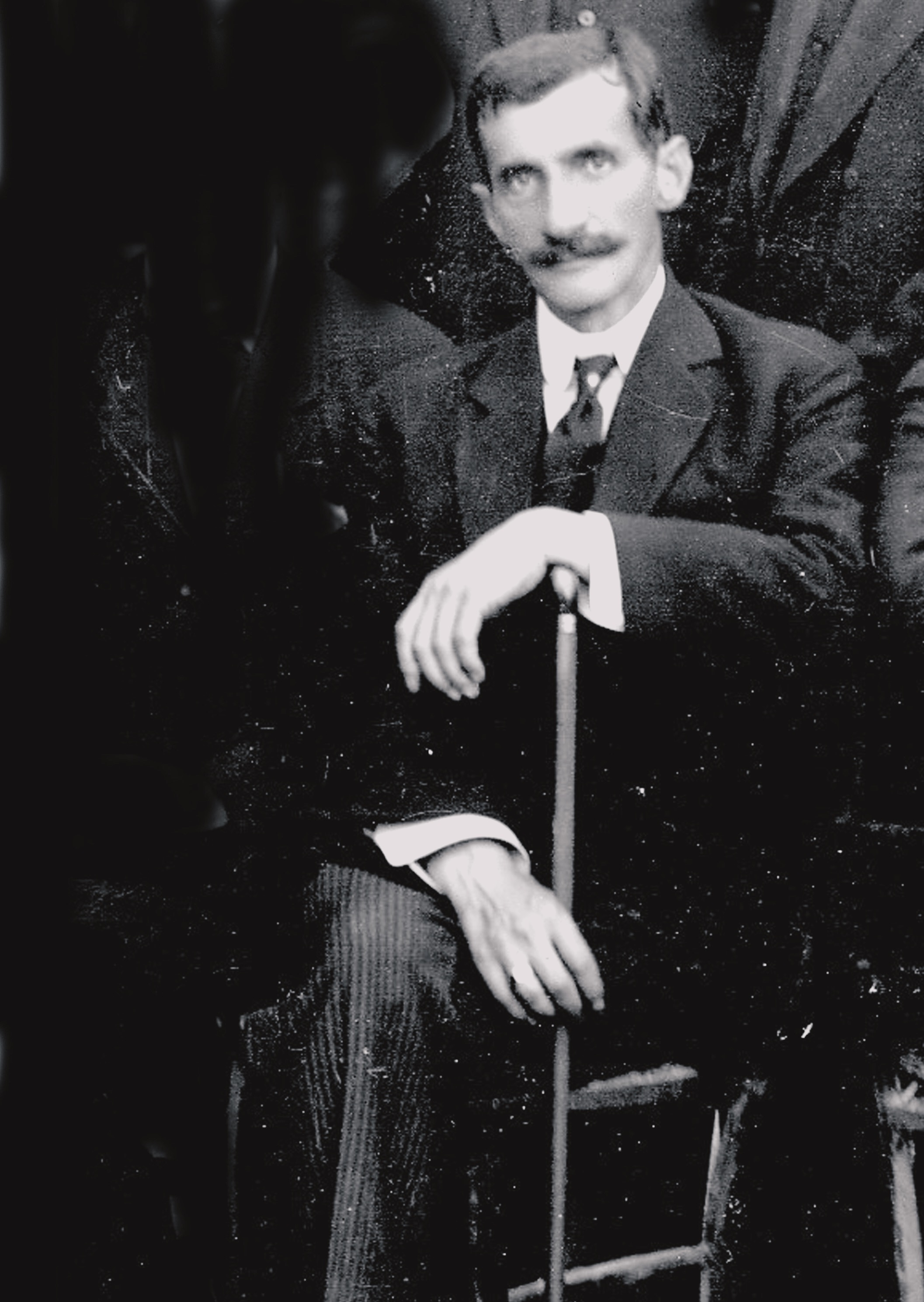
- Born: October 15, 1874; Korçë, Ottoman Empire
- Died: October 17, 1938 (aged 64)
- Other names: Eshtref Frashëri
- Occupations: Engineer, politician
- Known for: Chairman of the Parliament of Albania; Congress of Lushnje

Eshref Effendy Frasheri (October 15, 1874 – October 17, 1938), also referred to as Eshtref Bey Frashëri, was an Albanian politician. He served as co-Chairman of the National Council of Albania from 1921 until 1923 and Deputy Chairman 1932-1938.

== Life ==
Born in Korçë, in southern Albania, he studied Construction Engineering in Istanbul and in 1914 became member of the Albanian patriotic club there. Frashëri became member of the Committee for the National Defence of Kosovo. The Committee of Kosovo sent its delegates to the Congress of Lushnje of 1920. Frashëri together with Hysni Curri (who could not make it) and Xhemal Prishtina were elected to represent the Committee, the Prefecture of Kosovo (Has-Tropojë-Luma), and the Irredentist Kosovo. Frashëri had been one of the initiators of the call for the national congress since early January 1920. He also served as one of the directors during the Congress, and was one of the political figures that dominated it together with Aqif Pasha Elbasani and Ahmet Zogu. Frashëri was elected Deputy Prime Minister, and Minister of Public Works of the government that came out of it.

In May 1920, he was sent by the Government of Tirana in a mission to Korçë, to assure that the French army there would hand the city over to the Albanian government rather than the Greek armies located nearby the border. Frashëri organized a big meeting in the town, proclaimed the unification of the Autonomous Albanian Republic of Korçë with the rest of Albania and started gathering volunteers from areas around the town to prepare a militia, in case the Greeks would try to capture the town. The Protocol of Kapshtica that followed left Korçë definitely on the Albanian side.

During the period 1921-1934, Frasheri was member of Ahmet Zogu's "People's Party" (Albanian: Partia e Popullit).
Frashëri was also elected member of Albanian Senate during 1925-1928. On 2 March 1925 he became senator and head of the senate, thus vice-president of the republic. On April 5 of the same year he was placed in the center of a plot in Korçë for overthrowing Zog, but still managed to stay in good relations with him. Another plot was discovered on 23 September 1925, this time organized by Zog's brother in law Ceno Beg Kryeziu. This time he was obliged to resign from his posts, but still remained in good relations with Zog, who sent him to Corfu to put down political opposition. In 1938, he was elected member of the management board of SITA, an Italian-Albanian electrical company, but died soon after.
