= Xhafer Ypi =

Albanian politician (1880–1940)

Xhafer Ypi Bey
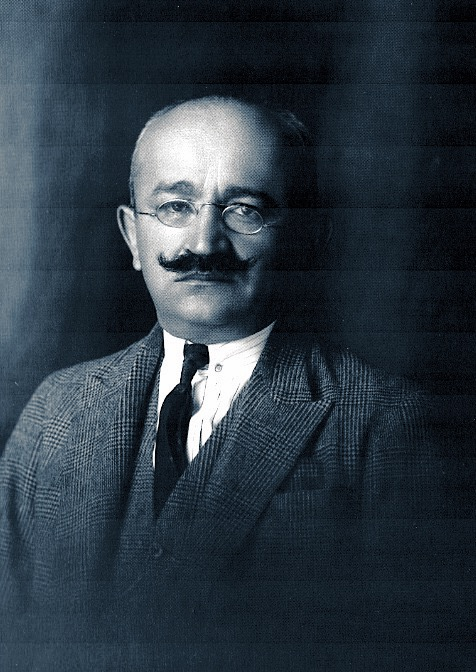

10th Prime Minister of Albania
- In office January 1922 – December 26, 1922
- Monarch: Wilhelm I
- Preceded by: Omer Vrioni
- Succeeded by: Ahmet Zogu

Personal details
- Born: January 12, 1880 Starje, Albania
- Died: December 17, 1940 (aged 60) Starje, Albania
- Cause of death: Assassinated
- Party: Popular Party (Albanian: Partia Popullore)

Xhafer Bey Ypi (Albanian pronunciation: [ˈdʒafɛɾ ˈbɛj ˈypi] January 12, 1880, Starje – December 17, 1940) was an Albanian politician.

A member of the Ypi family of Albania which was part of the Bektashi Order, he was educated at a university in Istanbul. In 1920–1921 he was Minister of Internal Affairs and Minister of Justice. He also held the position of Minister of Public Instruction.

As the leader of the Popular Party, in late December 1921 he formed a government where Fan S. Noli was the Minister of Foreign Affairs and Ahmed Zogu was the Minister of Internal Affairs. Until December 4, 1922, Ypi was Prime Minister; in 1922, after Noli's resignation, he was also acting Minister of Foreign Affairs.

From December 2, 1922, to January 31, 1925, Ypi was a member of the High Council of Regency (the collegial Head of State, formally for William of Wied). In June 1924 he left Albania because of Noli's revolt, but he kept holding the post formally.

During Zogu's reign, Ypi was Chief Inspector of the Royal Court. After King Zog had fled after Italian occupation, from April 9 to April 12 Ypi was chairman and Plenipotentiary for Justice of the Provisional Administration Committee, and as such acting head of state. From April 12, he was the Minister of Justice in Shefqet Verlaci's government. He was killed near his hometown by an aerial bomb during the Greco-Italian War.

His great-granddaughter is the Albanian political theorist and writer Lea Ypi.

== See also ==
- History of Albania

== Sources ==
- O.S. Pearson, Albania and King Zog, I.B. Tauris. 2005 (ISBN 1-84511-013-7).

Political offices
Preceded by Idhomene Kosturi	Prime Minister of Albania; January 1922–December 26, 1922	Succeeded by Ahmet Zogu
