= Pandeli Evangjeli =

Prime Minister of Albania (1859–1949)

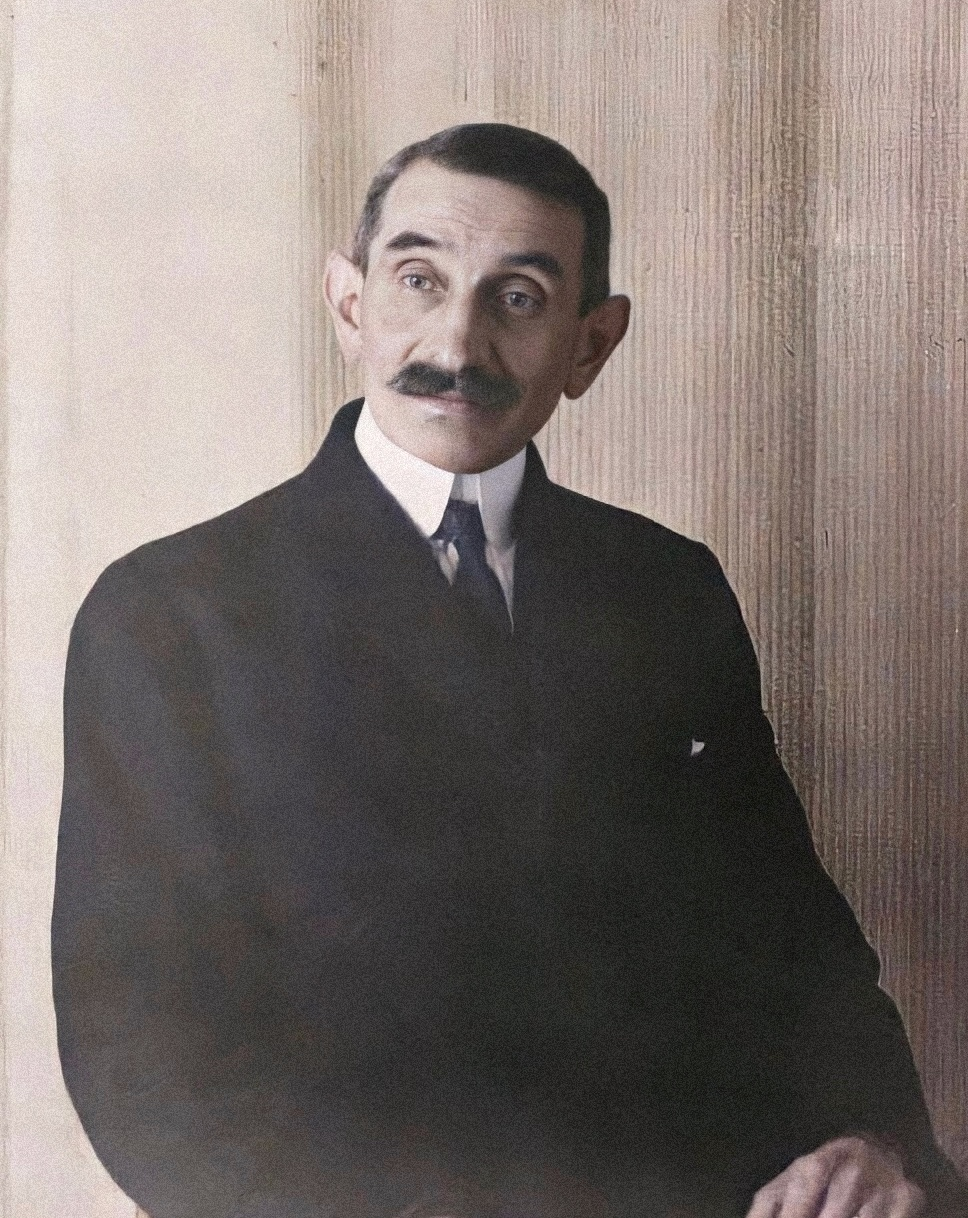
- Evangjeli in 1920

7th Prime Minister of Albania
- In office 16 October 1921 – 5 December 1921
- Monarch: Wilhelm I
- Preceded by: Sulejman Delvina
- Succeeded by: Qazim Koculi
- In office 6 March 1930 – 16 October 1935
- Monarch: Zog I
- Preceded by: Koço Kota
- Succeeded by: Mehdi Frashëri

Personal details
- Born: 6 January 1859 Korçë, Ottoman Empire (modern Albania)
- Died: 14 September 1949 (aged 90) Korçë, PR Albania

Pandeli Evangjeli (6 January 1859 – 14 September 1949) was an Albanian politician who served as the seventh prime minister of Albania briefly in 1921 and then from 1930 to 1935. He was Eastern Orthodox Christian.

== Early life and career ==
Born in Korçë in 1859, he spent most of his youth in the Albanian colony of Bucharest. He became chairman of the society "Dituria" ("Knowledge") in 1897, and contributed in the establishment of a local "Committee for the Liberation of Albania", one of the many of that time. He was a member of the Macedo-Romanian Cultural Society in 1912 and once donated100 Romanian lei for a chapel and school for the Aromanians of Korçë. Evangjeli became prefect of his native city in 1914 after returning from Romania.

== Prime Minister of Albania ==
As part of the government of Sulejman Delvina, he was soon part of the Albanian delegation in the Paris Peace Conference in 1920. He was then elected a member of the parliament, then Prime Minister from 16 October 1921 to 5 December 1921. From 1922 to 1924 he was Foreign Minister.

During Fan Noli's tenure after the June Revolution he exiled in Romania, returning in 1925 when he was elected Head of the Senate. As a representative of Korça, he headed the session that proclaimed Albania as a Constitutional Monarchy and Ahmet Zogu as King of Albania. A strong supporter of Zog, he directed three cabinets as Prime Minister from 1930 to 1935. He was replaced by Mehdi Frashëri after he was criticized for "failing to maintain peace and order" during the Revolt of Fier in 1935. He served as Parliamentary President until the Italian invasion of 1939.

Although he was considered a pro-Italian, and his name appears in the Assembly list of 1943, he did not play an active role during World War II and the communist regime did not persecute him.

== Death ==
Evangjeli died in Korçë in 1949.

== See also ==
- History of Albania
- List of prime ministers of Albania

Political offices
Preceded by Ilias Bej Vrioni	Prime Minister of Albania; 16 October 1921 – 5 December 1921	Succeeded by Qazim Koculi
Preceded by Koço Kota	Prime Minister of Albania; 5 March 1930 – 22 October 1935	Succeeded by Mehdi Bej Frashëri
