= Shefqet Vërlaci =

Albanian politician and prime minister (1877–1946)

Shefqet Vërlaci Bey
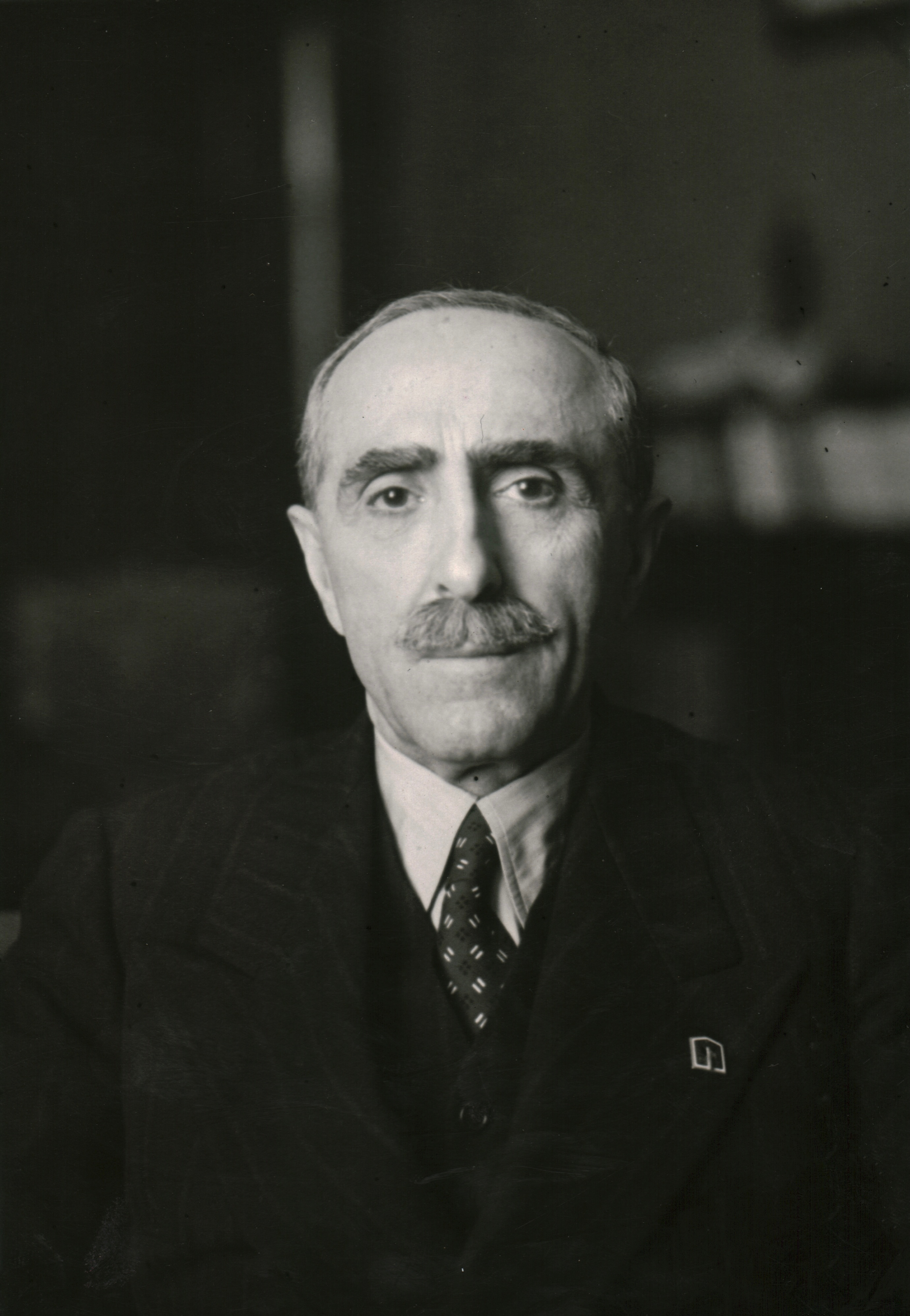

12th Prime Minister of Albania
- In office 30 March 1924 – 27 May 1924
- Monarch: Wilhelm I
- Preceded by: Ahmet Zogu
- Succeeded by: Ilias Vrioni
- In office 12 April 1939 – 4 December 1941
- Monarchs: Zog I Victor Emmanuel III
- Preceded by: Kostaq Kotta
- Succeeded by: Mustafa Merlika-Kruja

Senator of the Senate of the Kingdom of Italy
- In office Aprile 08, 1939 – August 25, 1944
- Monarch: Victor Emmanuel III

Personal details
- Born: 15 December 1877 Elbasan, Manastir Vilayet, Ottoman Empire (modern-day Albania)
- Died: 21 July 1946 (aged 68) Zürich, Switzerland
- Party: Progressive Party; Albanian Fascist Party
- Profession: Prime Minister

Shefqet Bey Vërlaci (Note: Verlaci's name also is found under the forms Vërlaci, Verlaçi, Verlaxhi, and Velaxhi. His first name also is written in various forms, including Shevket, as on his gravestone.) (Albanian pronunciation: [ʃɛfcɛt vəɾlat͡si]; 15 December 1877 – 21 July 1946), also known as Shevket Verlaci, was an Albanian politician and wealthy landowner who served as the 12th Prime Minister of Albania. During his career, he held political and administrative positions and was listed as a Senator in the Senate of the Kingdom of Italy, where he was recorded as residing in Tirana and described by profession as possidente (landowner). He was the father of Behie, Fazilet, Ismail and Mehtab.

== Biography ==
Shefqet Vërlaci was born on 15 December 1877 in Elbasan, Manastir Vilayet, Ottoman Empire, now modern day central Albania, into an Albanian family. In 1922, Vërlaci was the biggest landowner in Albania. He was the leader of the Progressive Party, the largest conservative party in Albania, which strongly opposed any agrarian reform that would reduce landowners' property. The Progressive Party included some North Albanian clan chiefs and prominent Muslim landowners as its members.

He was elected a deputy for the first time in the elections of April 5, 1921. In late 1922, Ahmed Zogu(The king of Albania 1928-1939) became engaged to Vërlaci's daughter, winning his support and the position of Prime Minister.

On 3 March 1924, Zogu was forced to cede his position of Prime Minister to Vërlaci, because of a financial scandal and an attempt at assassination in which Zogu was injured. Vërlaci held this position until 27 May of the same year and then fled to Italy. During Fan Noli's regime that followed, a special tribunal created by the government condemned Vërlaci to death in absentia along with the confiscation of all his property.

After being crowned King of Albania in 1928, Zogu broke off his engagement to Vërlaci's daughter and instead married Countess Géraldine of the noble Apponyi family. This led to a highly conflicted relationship between Zog and Vërlaci in the years that followed.

On 12 April 1939, after the Italian invasion of Albania, Vërlaci became the prime minister of the government of Albania formed under the Italian occupation. From 12 April through 16 April (until Italy's King Victor Emmanuel III accepted the Albanian crown), Vërlaci was the acting head of state. Vërlaci was also named by King Victor Emmanuel III senator of the kingdom of Italy.

Vërlaci remained at the head of the government until 4 December (other sources cite 10 November or 3 December), 1941.

He died in 1946 in Zürich, Switzerland, and is buried in the Protestant Cemetery in Rome.

== See also ==
- History of Albania

== Notes ==
Political offices
Preceded by Ahmet Zogu	Prime Minister of Albania; 5 March 1924 – 2 June 1924	Succeeded by Iliaz Vrioni
Preceded by Koço Kota	Prime Minister of Albania; 12 April 1939 – 4 December 1941	Succeeded by Mustafa Merlika-Kruja
