= List of assassinations in Albania =

This is a list of assassinations in Albania from the year 1913 to present day. Included in the list are public figures and other prominent individuals who were active in Albanian politics and daily life. Also included are assassinations that took place outside the present day borders of Albania. Not included are those who died as casualties of war or were killed by the State.

== Assassinations (1913–present) ==
No.	Name of victim(s)	Portrait	Highest position held	Date assassinated	Name of assassin(s)	Place of assassination	Suspected motive and description of the assassination
1	Hasan Rıza Pasha		General in the Ottoman-Albanian army of Scutari Vilayet	31 January 1913	Osman Bali, Mehmet Kavaja	A remote street near Rozafa Castle, Shkodër	Assailants were sent on the orders of Esad Toptani whose aim was to be the commander in charge of defending Shkodër from the invading Montenegrin forces.
2	Gjeto Çoku		Prefect of Lezhë	7 October 1913	Prenk Kol Brunga	Lezhë	Brunga was paid by the House of Prenk Bib Doda to eliminate the Prefect of Lezhë. Brunga, a paid guard in the Gendarmerie of Lezhë at the time, assassinated Gjeto Çoku at dusk as the Prefect was taking an evening stroll with Franz Nopcsa.
3	Lodewijk Thomson		Dutch military commander during the governance of Turhan Pasha.	15 June 1914	Unknown	Ura e Dajlanit, Durrës	Thomson made plenty of enemies during his short time of service in the country. The real motive of his murder has yet to be uncovered.
4	Nexhat Libohova		Minister of Finance	26 May 1915	Osman Bali	Shkallnur, Durrës	Political dispute with Esad Toptani.
5	Çerçiz Topulli		Commander of the Gjirokastër military band	17 July 1915	Montenegrin soldiers	Shtoji field, Golem, Shkodër	Revenge over the killing of the Greek bishop Photios in 1906.
6	Ded Gjo Luli		Leader of the Albanian revolt of 1911	24 September 1915	Unknown	Sheshëz, Orosh	Killed for nationalist motives.
7	Isa Boletini		Leader of the uprising to liberate Albanian lands	23 January 1916	Pero Burič	Ribnica bridge, Podgorica, Montenegro	Killed to suppress the Albanian resistance.
8	Stath Melani		Orthodox priest	24 December 1917	Josif Soropulli, Josif Stërmbeci, Vangjel Radimishti	Balta e kuqe, Lipivan, Përmet	Melani was killed by a group of Greek nationalists for insisting on the use of the Albanian language in the local Orthodox liturgy.
10	Prenk Bib Doda		Deputy Prime Minister	22 March 1919	Prenk Gjeto Çoku	Zejmen, Lezhë	Bib Doda was killed in an ambush, while traveling from Durrës to Shëngjin in the company of British diplomat Eden, who was wounded. The motive was revenge for Bib Doda's ordering the assassination of Prenk Gjeto Çoku's father, Gjeto Çoku, the Prefect of Lezhë.
11	Xhelal Koprëncka		Signatory of the Albanian Declaration of Independence	21 October 1919	Syrja Guri	Dëllinjë, Qafa e Martës, Skrapar	Murdered for personal revenge.
12	Sali Nivica		Journalist, Director of newspaper "Populli"	11 January 1920	Kolë Ashiku	A street near the Post Office, Shkodër	Killed for personal reasons.
13	Abdyl Ypi		Prefect of Durrës	15 January 1920	Sulejman Haxhi	Durrës	Killed on the orders of Mustafa Kruja as one of the initiators of the Congress of Lushnjë.
15	Meleq Frashëri		General Commander of the Gendarmerie	8 March 1922	Unknown	Kodër-Kamëz, Tirana	Killed during clashes with the rebels against the government.
17	George B. De Long; Robert L. Coleman		Real estate businessman Financier	6 April 1924	Local bandits	Ura e Përroit, Mamurras	The only conclusive motive for the murders was random burglary.
18	Avni Rustemi		Member of the Parliament	20 April 1924	Jusuf Reçi	Hoxha Tahsin St., Tirana	The motive of the assassination remains a mystery.
19	Azem Galica		Commander of a military band	25 July 1924	Yugoslavian forces	Galicë, Kosovo	Galica was killed by Yugoslav forces to suppress the movement against incorporating Kosovo into the newly formed state of Yugoslavia.
20	Elez Isufi		Commander of the Dibër Band	30 December 1924	Unknown assailants	Kazermat, Peshkopi	The murder of Isufi was widely seen as a treasonous act.
21	Luigj Gurakuqi		Served as Minister of Education two months prior.	2 March 1925	Balto Stamolla	Bari, Italy	Stamolla was a close relative of the Albanian Counsel in Bari, Çatin Saraçi.
22	Zija Dibra		Served as Minister of Public Works in the Evangjeli I Cabinet	6 January 1925	Unknown	Harizaj, Kavajë	Dibra was a fierce political opponent of prime minister Ahmet Zogu who came to power just two days after the assassination took place.
23	Bajram Curri		Served as Minister of War in 1921	29 March 1925	Unidentified	By a cave in Dragobi, Tropojë	Killed by assailants who were sent on the orders of Hysen Kryeziu, at the time serving as the Prefect of Kosovo.
24	Osman Bali		Commander of the Presidential Guard	5 September 1926	Myslim Peza, Islam Leka	Near Ura e Tabakëve, Tirana	The killing was due to political revenge.
25	Isuf Dibra		Served as Minister of War in the Toptani Cabinet	19 March 1927	Unknown	Tirana	Murdered by his assistant under unknown circumstances.
26	Ceno Kryeziu		Minister of Albania in Prague	14 October 1927	Alqiviadh Bebi	Prague, Czechoslovakia	Killed for having collaborated with the Yugoslavs. The assassin was a close relative to Andon Beça, an ally of Shefqet Vërlaci.
27	Llesh Topallaj		Officer of the Republican Guard	21 February 1931	Ndok Gjeloshi, Azis Çami	Operngasse St., Vienna, Austria	The official motive that circulated in the media at the time was that the assailants were trying to assassinate Ahmet Zogu.
28	Mark Kapidani		Member of the Parliament	19 December 1932	Geg Marka Gega	Inside the Officers' Hall, near the Royal Palace, Tirana	The assassin was a former officer in the Army Reserve, once sentenced to 15 years imprisonment for his attempts to overthrow the government.
29	Bajazid Doda		Photographer, Personal Secretary of Baron Nopcsa	25 April 1933	Franz Nopcsa von Felső-Szilvás	Singerstrasse St., Vienna, Austria	Killed for personal reasons.
30	Hasan Prishtina		Former Prime Minister	13 August 1933	Ibrahim Çelo	Thessaloniki, Greece	The assassin was apparently a former acquaintance but motives of the assassination remain unclear.
31	Leon De Ghilardi		Officer of the Austro-Hungarian Army	16 August 1933	Xhevahir Arapi	Mulliri i Kashtës, Fier	Killed during the anti-government revolt.
32	Qazim Bodinaku		Served as Prefect of Vlorë and later Berat	6 April 1939	Unknown	Unknown	A Zog loyalist, he was murdered as he was trying to leave the country by 2 persons whom he had had a previous dispute with.
33	Daut Hoxha		Commander of the Chameria Band	14 June 1940	Sotir Demiri, Vangjel Pando, Dhimo Koçi, Kolo Sulioti, Sotir Vangjeli	Sheshi i Rrahut, Konispol	The victim had been sentenced to death by the Greek State because of his anti-Greek resurgence in the region.
34	Xhafer Ypi		Former Prime Minister	17 December 1940	Unknown	Unknown	Killed during aerial bombardments.
35	Sali Nijazi Dede		Dedebaba, Founder of the Bektashi Order	28 November 1941	Italian agents	Bektashi Headquarters, Tirana	Did not accept to sign the act of invasion by Fascist Italy.
36	Musa Puka		Prefect of Elbasan	2 October 1942	Unknown	Elbasan	Killed on a roadside by communist rebels.
37	Skënder Çami		Police Superintendent for Korçë	4 March 1942	Unknown	Unknown	The motives of the killing remain unknown.
38	Qemal Stafa		Leader of the Communist Youth	5 May 1942	A local policeman	Tirana	Stafa was killed in a house on the outskirts of Tirana by a local Carabinieri. Rumors say that he may have been betrayed by one or more of his comrades, possibly Enver Hoxha (the first secretary of the Albanian communist party & leader of Albania), because he gained much from his death.
39	Saverino Ricottini		Member of the Fascist Upper Council	25 March 1943	Unknown	Peja, Kosovo	The motives of the murder are unknown.
40	Qazim Koculi		Served as Acting Prime Minister	2 January 1943	Halil Alia	Vlorë	Murdered by the fascist mercenary battalion of Halil Alia for personal reasons.
41	Iljas Agushi		Deputy Prime Minister in the Merlika Cabinet	27 October 1943	Bujar Hoxha, Shahin Gjashta	Tirana	The motives of the assassination were due to Agushi's collaboration with the invading Nazi forces.
42	Hysen Myshketa		Member of the National Council	8 October 1943	Unknown	Durrës	Myshketa and his brother were murdered by three assassins as they were walking along the "Mussolini Boardwalk".
43	Idhomen Kosturi		Chairman of the National Council	5 November 1943	Kolë Laku	Tirana	Murdered under the orders of the Communist Guerrilla unit.
44	Aziz Çami		Military commander in the Vlora War	15 December 1943	Communist forces	Tirana	Murdered for being a member of the Balli Kombëtar.
45	Veli Vasjari		Chief of State Police	12 May 1944	Unknown	Korçë	Killed by communist partisans near the region of Gabravicë.
46	Mustafa Gjinishi		Board member of the National Liberation Council	26 August 1944	Unknown	Sllatinë, Dibër	His death occurred during mysterious circumstances as he traveled to northern Albania.
47	Lefter Kosova		Minister of Public Works under the Biçakçiu Cabinet	6 September 1944	Xhelal Staravecka	Tirana	Murdered because of a previous political dispute.
48	Mark Kodheli		Consul of Albania in Bari, Italy	1944	Unknown		
49	Shaban Polluzha		Member of the Yugoslavian Parliament	21 February 1945	Yugoslavian soldiers	Tërstenik, Drenicë, Kosovo	He was killed for being an irredentist.
50	Miladin Popović		Head of the Communist Yugoslav Mission in Albania	13 March 1945	Haki Taha	Pristina, Kosovo	Popović mediated plans of keeping the territory of Kosovo under Serbian supervision.
51	Ndrecë Ndue Gjoka		Deputy chairman of the executive committee of Mirditë	17 February 1946	Members of the Mountains Committee	Qafë-Vorrëz, Kaçinar, Mirditë	Killed for spreading educational leaflets.
52	Mark Gjon Marku		Minister of Interior in the Bushati Cabinet	14 June 1946	Members of Armed Forces	Perlat Forest, Prosek, Mirditë	Killed for personal reasons.
53	Baba Faja Martaneshi		Deputy Leader of the National Liberation Front	18 March 1947	Dede Baba Abazi	Bektashi Headquarters, Tirana	Murdered due to political and religious differences.
54	Kostaq Kotta		Prime Minister	1 September 1947	Two prison guards	Burrel Prison	Murdered because he was considered a political enemy.
55	Nako Spiru		High ranking communist official in charge of the State Planning Commission	20 November 1947	Unknown	Tirana	The murder was officially ruled a suicide but he was most likely killed under the orders of Koçi Xoxe.
56	Josif Papamihali		Mission head of the Unity Church of Albania	26 October 1948	Labor camp guards	Maliq	He was considered an enemy of the state along with thirty-seven other priests.
57	Bardhok Biba		Member of the People's Assembly	9 August 1949	Unknown	Kaçinar, Lezhë	Killed by the anti-communist resistance guerrilla unit "Komiteti i Maleve".
58	Pal Mëlyshi		Agent of the Sigurimi	12 April 1950	Unknown	Ujë-Lurth, Mirditë	His suspicious death was considered accidental.
59	Alush Lleshanaku		Legislative Member of the Corporative Fascist Upper Council	24 December 1950	Ilo Stojko	Elbasan	A staunch anti-communist resistance leader, Lleshanaku was assassinated by an agent of the Sigurimi.
60	Sali Ormeni		Director of the Albanian State Police	2 March 1951	Unknown	Rrogozhinë	Killed mysteriously a week after the bombing of the Soviet Embassy.
61	Omer Nishani		Former Head of State	26 May 1954	Unknown	Tirana	His murder was officially ruled a suicide.
62	Teme Sejko		Commander of the Naval Fleet	31 May 1961	Qemal Birçe, Islam Gjondede	Maminas, Durrës	The perpetrators tied a rope around his neck and killed him for personal reasons.
63	Haxhi Hajdari		Member of the People's Assembly	8 April 1963	Unknown	Unknown	Denounced as the "People's Enemy" by the regime, he was killed by artillery gunfire.
64	Myslym Keta		Commander of the Tanks Regiment	26 February 1966	Unknown	Fushë-Arrëz	Keta was suspected to be an opponent of dictator Enver Hoxha.
65	Mehmet Shehu		Prime Minister	17 December 1981	Unknown	Tirana	The official death was ruled a suicide but Shehu was more than likely killed by the Sigurimi under Hoxha's orders.
66	Jusuf Gërvalla		Member of the Movement for Liberation of Kosovo	17 January 1982	Agents of the UDB	Stuttgart, Federal Republic of Germany	To suppress the Albanian nationalist movement in Kosovo.
67	Mustafa Band		Exiles	27 September 1982	Security Forces	Zhamë, Rrogozhinë	Prevented plot to assassinate dictator Enver Hoxha.
68	Jean Marie Massellin		French Employee Club Med Corfu	18 Jun 1984	Albanian Border Guards	Vrine, Butrinti	Killed by Albanian border guards for accidentally straying in Albanian territorial waters.
69	Aleksandër Kondo		National Weightlifting Champion	1 May 1987	Unknown	Gas station, New York	Likely assassination by Sigurimi agents to make it appear as an accident.
70	Josif Budo		Local worker	10 July 1990	Luan Allajbeu	Main street, Kavajë	Killed for being an opponent of the regime.
71	Artan Lenja		Wrestler	24 February 1991	Military patrol	Rruga "Ndre Mjeda", Tirana	Killed by a military patrol unit in charge of enforcing public order.
72	Arben Broci		Engineer at a cigarette factory	2 April 1991	Unknown	Shkodër	Killed by a sniper to suppress public disorder.
73	Gazmend Muça		Criminal	7 April 1992	Naim Zyberi, Franc Konomi	Xhamlliku, Tirana	Killed for personal reasons.
74	Remzi Hoxha		Businessman	21 October 1995	Responsible: Arben Sefgjini, Ilir Kumbaro, Avni Koldashi, Budion Meçe	Kunë-Vain, Lezhë	The speculative rumor was that Hoxha was a former UDB agent. He died from the injuries sustained during his torture inside the SHIK facility.
75	Bujar Kaloshi		General Director of Prisons	26 July 1996	Unknown	Former aviation field, Tirana	Kaloshi's murder was likely influenced by his position as head of the prison system.
76	Ahmet Krasniqi		Kosovo's Minister of Defence	21 September 1998	Unknown	"Haxhi Dalliu" street, Tirana	The motives for his killing are not yet known.
77	Azem Hajdari		Member of the Assembly	22 September 1998	Fatmir Haklaj, Jaho Mulosmani, Naim Cangu	Tirana	The suspected motive for Hajdari's assassination was political revenge.
78	Kleanthi Koçi		Chief Justice of the Supreme Court	21 February 1999	Unknown	Near Tirana International Hotel	Motives for his killing have yet to be uncovered.
79	Arben Zylyftari		Police chief in Shkodër	2 August 2000	Bahri Tafili	Lagja "Udhakryq", Shkodër	Killed due to his position as chief of police.
80	Salih Tivari		General Secretary of the Muslim Community of Albania	13 January 2002	Unknown	Headquarters of the Muslim Community of Albania	Tivari had raised doubts about financial contributions coming from anonymous Muslim organizations.
81	Gani Malushi		Chief of Police in Fushë-Krujë	6 August 2003	Agim Pepa	Durrës	The actual target in the killing was Malushi's personal chauffeur.
82	Gramoz Palushi		Football fan	4 September 2004	Panajotis Kladhis	Island of Zakinthos, Greece	Killed because he celebrated the football victory of Albania over Greece.
83	Vajdin Lame		Businessman	28 February 2005	Unknown	Tirana	Lame was part owner of national television station Top Channel. He was killed from a bomb planted inside an elevator alongside his friend Artan Arsi.
84	Edmond Malollari		President of Tomori Berat football club	14 December 2005	Unknown	Tirana	The motive for the killing in broad daylight was likely because of unpaid debt.
85	Fatmir Xhindi		Member of the Assembly	2 May 2009	Unknown	Roskovec, Fier	Motives of his murder remain a mystery.
86	Fatos Xhani, Altin Dizdari, Sajmir Duçkallari, Kastriot Feskaj		State Police officers	7 August 2009	Dritan Dajti	Iliria beach, Durrës	The officers on duty were killed as Dajti was resisting arrest.
87	Remzi Veseli		Mayor of Tërthore Commune	25 October 2010	Unknown	Kukës	Motives for the killing remain unsolved.
88	Hekuran Deda, Faik Myrtaj, Ziver Veizi, Aleks Nika		Participants in an anti-government protest	21 January 2011	Ndrea Prendi, Agim Llupo	"Dëshmorët e Kombit" Boulevard, Tirana	Randomly killed to warn protesters from entering the Prime Minister's Office building.
89	Skerdilajd Konomi		Judge of the 1st Circuit Court in Vlorë	9 September 2011	Unknown	"Vlorë-Skelë" street, Vlorë	Motives for the killing have yet to be uncovered.
90	Arjan Selimi		Drug trafficker	26 September 2011	Unknown	Tirana	Selimi was the fiancé of television personality Inis Gjoni. His killing was a result of his past as a convicted drug trafficker.
91	Adem Tahiraj		Chief of Police in Shijak	12 September 2012	Ilir Xhakja	Katund-Sukth, Durrës	Shot and killed during an operation for the arrest of the suspect.
92	Dritan Lamaj		Chief of Commissariat No. 6 in Tirana	25 February 2013	Arben Frroku	Tirana	Frroku, a local businessman, had been physically assaulted by Lamaj a few months prior.
93	Artan Santo		Founder of Credins Bank	26 June 2014	Unknown	"Ibrahim Rugova" street, Tirana	Motives for his murder remain a mystery.
94	Ibrahim Basha		Officer of RENEA	24 June 2015	Unknown	Lazarat, Gjirokastër	Killed by sniper fire during a drug sting operation.
95	Artan Cuku		Police chief of Vlorë	8 April 2017	Mikel Shallari	Rruga e Kosovarëve, Tirana	Killed for work related revenge.

== Murders by the numbers ==
Number of people murdered in Albania since 1990.

_{129} / _{205} / _{251} / _{268} / _{265} / _{210} / _{248} / _{1542} / _{573} / _{496}; '90 / '91 / '92 / '93 / '94 / '95 / '96 / '97 / '98 / '99	Total: 4187

_{275} / _{208} / _{179} / _{144} / _{119} / _{131} / _{87} / _{103} / _{88} / _{82}; '00 / '01 / '02 / '03 / '04 / '05 / '06 / '07 / '08 / '09	Total: 1416

_{118} / _{124} / _{126} / _{107} / _{98} / _{54} / _{71} / _{47} / _{68} / _{57}; '10 / '11 / '12 / '13 / '14 / '15 / '16 / '17 / '18 / '19	Total: 870
