= Congress of Durrës =

1918 conference of Albanian political leaders

The town of Durrës in 1918.

The Congress of Durrës (Albanian: Kongresi i Durrësit) was a conference of Albanian political leaders, held from December 25 to December 27, 1918, in Durrës, at the time capital of the Principality of Albania.

Mehmet Konica was the Chairman of the Congress, which aimed at establishing an Albanian National Council or Government under the influence of Italian authorities. It elected a government which fell in January 1920 after the Congress of Lushnjë.

== Background ==
The efforts to form an Albanian government had begun with the start of the First World War, after the departure of Prince Wied and his government. Albanians have ceased efforts during the global conflict, but despite all later attempts, they had encountered strong opposition from the occupying armies. The chances of forming an Albanian government became higher by the end of the First World War, when the Albanians were constrained to harmonize all efforts to avoid real threats coming from the war-winning neighbors. These threats were being institutionalized through the Paris Peace Conference.

Following the events carefully, Albanians found themselves before a very important international event, which required political maturity and restraint. The government in exile, represented by Essad Toptani, had made itself a sufficient publicity through European newspapers. Not only his political profile was not damaged, but rather it was given a place of honor as the "first Albanian diplomat in the eyes of European diplomacy".

These were some of the circumstances which had driven Vatra, as published later through the newspaper Dielli (The Sun), to demand to the Italian government to respect the will of all Albanians, allowing them to form in Albania a government of their own. This was in August 1918, while World War I was not still over. A similar request to the Italian side came also Myfid Libohova, who in October demanded to the Italians the establishment of a provisional government, which would work side by side with the Italian counterpart in "fighting against common enemies".

== Preparations ==
By the end of World War I, the Italians needed an Albanian government composed of pro-Italian elements. This required, first to create the impression that Albanians demanded a government brought to life with the support of Italy, and second, an official government body established legally, which would be the best option to avoid any other representatives of Albania (claimants) which might show up and be introduced at the Peace Conference.

This government would server as a domestic support, but also to avoid any territorial claims from the Balkan neighbors. Sonnino called Turhan Pasha, Myfid Libohova, and Mihal Turtulli for a summon in Rome on October 22, 1918. They should make contact with the Albanian colonies, and form an interim government where the large Albanian provinces as well as all religions were represented. Turhan Pasha and Myfid Libohova resided still in Italy during early November, while the Albanian newspaper "The Nation" (Albanian: Kombi) was presenting them as "patriots and people with a spotless past".

Mihal Turtulli had the mandate of Vatra but was still residing in Switzerland. He didn't go to Italy as requested initially, evaluating the danger of Italy's colonialist intentions, but did not succeed to find any support within Albania. Italians managed to replace Turtulli with another delegate from Vatra, which was Mehmet Konica. Konica was called to go to Rome on November 3–4, 1918.

Gathering of Albanian leaders had already started by October 1918, with the support of Mehdi Frashëri and Mustafa Kruja, both pro-Italian at that time. The same were asking Vatra on October 6, 1918 to send the representatives in Italy for discussing the ground of a common political platform, which would be represented at the Peace Conference. Mehmet Konica, according to "Kombi", arrived in Rome on November 19, warmly received by the Italian side.

Meanwhile, the Italian government had given up the initial idea of assembling an Albanian government. Albanians leaders, who came from Rome to Albania, were advised to form only a "National Council" or "National Committee" rather than a government. This half-government should not exercise independent politics, neither internally nor internationally, and would depend a lot on Italian decision making. All this was ostensibly made to avoid any diplomatic entanglement.

In late November 1918, the approval of forming the Albanian National Council arrived. The council was pre-designed by Gaetano Manconi and was supposed to be formed as soon as possible in Durrës. Regardless of the factual substantial form, either as a government or as a council, this governing body should come after a national congress. Mehmet Konica, Myfid Libohova, and Mehdi Frashëri were launched in Albania in late December 1918, accompanied by Lieutenant Ettore Lodi, who would perform political tasks during the congress as well as later.

The preparation stage for a Congress in Durrës was accompanied by an initiative to gather a congress or meeting in Shkodra. The later idea came impossible due to objections of French Colonel Bardy De Fourtou, and the meeting took place in Lezhë on December 9, 1918, being organized by Catholic clerics and tribal chieftain of Mirdita, Prênk Bibë Doda, but this movement found no support on other Albanian regions because of its emphasized "Northern Albanian" character.

=== Congress of Tirana ===
The preparation took place with the initiative of Rauf Fico (vice-prefect) and Abdi Toptani on a meeting held on December 7 at Fico's office. Other initiators were Sotir Peçi, Abdyl Ypi, Ismail Ndroqi, Mytesim Kelliçi, Sinan Hoxha, and Myslim Beshiri. An invitation was sent to representatives of central regions, with a special invitation for Hasan Prishtina, Aqif Pashë Elbasani, and Ahmet Zogu who were invited to come earlier.

The Congress of Tirana was held on 19–20 December, which was attended this time only by representatives of several provinces of central Albania led by Abdi Toptani and Ismail Ndroqi, with the aim of establishing the grounds of a National Congress (initially was thought to be held in Krujë in January 1919) which would be achieved later in Durrës.

== Events ==
The congress was opened on the afternoon of 25 December 1918, with the participation of 53 delegates. They came from most Albanian regions, which were under Italian occupation. The delegates from Vlora were not allowed following strict instructions received from Rome. Congress lacked also the representatives of the provinces that were under Serb occupation, Peshkopi, and Has-Luma, and even those who were under French occupation, as the Korçë area.

Delegates by region:

- Gjirokastër - Mufid Libohova, Polo Meksi, Petro Poga, Apostol Dhima, Vasil Dilo
- Delvinë - Namik Bey Delvina, Hikmet Bey Delvina
- Tepelenë - Sylejman Shehu, Koço Harito
- Përmet - Baba Xhemali, Dhimitër Kacimbra
- Dishnicë & Këlcyrë - Baba Mustafa, Baba Hyseni
- Frashër - Rexhep Selfo
- Kurvelesh - Ali Koka
- Kolonjë - Abdullah Bey, Petër Prodani
- Berat - Sami Vrioni, Dhimitër Tutulani, Fejzi Alizoti
- Mallakastër - Hajredin Çakrani, Kamber Belishova
- Lushnje - Ahmet Resuli, Jakov Bozo
- Skrapar - Xhelal Koprëncka, Servet Bey Zaloshnja
- Elbasan - Shefqet Vërlaci, Lef Nosi, Ahmed Dakli
- Peqin - Ismail Haki Kadiu, Xhavit Metobashi
- Durrës - Hafiz Aliu, Mihal Truja, Mustafa Merlika-Kruja
- Kavajë - Qazim Bey Hyti (Elbasani), Sheh Hamiti
- Krujë - Muharrem Pengili, Xhemal Belegu
- Shijak - Ymer Bey Shijaku, Rexhep Jella
- Tirana - Abdi Toptani (did not attend), Ismail Efendy Ndroqi
- Mat - Abdurrahman Bey Çela, Hasan Bey Zogolli
- Shkodër - Riza Dani, Ndoc Çoba, Luigj Gurakuqi (instead of Prenk Bib Doda)

In addition to the delegates' list, there were other political figures present in Durrës. The local newspaper Agimi ("The Dawn") would redirect to this issue in detail in Mars 1921 (vol.54, p. 155): "During the congress, persons that lacked the delegate mandate managed to get the right of speech and proposals." Prior to discussing the agenda, the representatives of Durrës expressed concern about the lack of participation from all the provinces of Albania. The secretary of the congress on behalf of the Assembly expressed the despair of Assembly regarding the absence of representatives of Vlora, Himara, and other provinces considered as integral part of Albania. Other delegates as Sotir Peçi and Idhomene Kosturi declared they would not participate because the delegates were not elected legitimately, so they did not represent Korça region. According to them, the selection process was done by "shouting out load the names, and urging people".

The proceedings continued with the delegates showing trust to the war-winning powers, and a special greeting to the US President Woodrow Wilson who had revealed and supported the principles of self determination of the nations. Meanwhile, Luigj Gurakuqi mentioned the declarations of the US Senator Henry Lodge published in early December right before the congress. The declaration mentioned that one of the cornerstones of future peace is the creation of Albania out of all those who speak Albanian. Therefore, Lodge's name was added to Wilson's in the special greeting list.

The congress discussed regarding the Italian side, which could show interest in supporting the territorial claims of the Albanians. According to Myfid Libohova's memories, it appears that Mehmet Konica submitted an Italian proposal for the formation of an Executive Committee which will try to delegate an Albanian representative body to the Peace Conference and will operate within the country ensuring national and political life of the Albanian people. On the other hand, Mehmet Konica supported the proposal of Namik Delvina and Riza Dani, for the creation of a provisional government, which should be accepted by Rome authorities. He asked that before this was announced, it was necessary to obtain a response from Rome, hoping that the Italians would finally accept it. While several other delegates stated that the government was the desire of the Albanian people and it did not matter if it would be accepted by Italy or not.

Afterwards, the congress went through the established agenda. The delegates refused the first point on the agenda, which stipulated the formation of a committee that, based on the record, had two tasks: first, send an Albanian delegation at the Peace Conference; and second, to ensure national political life of the Albanian people. The delegates decided the formation of an interim government, which was an independent decision and defiant against the diplomatic positioning of Rome so far.

Regarding this issue there were two positionings, which were expressed by Mehmet Konica's words on December 26: "When the delegates, by an absolute majority, agreed on the formation of the interim government after accepting the decisions of the yesterday's meeting, even the Italian command which was given the news, was kind enough to commit to communicating it to its own government. In two or three days the answer from Rome will come, stating that it has been accepted or not". Meanwhile, Hikmet Bey Delvina said that Albanians honored the Italian Command allocated in Albania for the care and kindness showed towards Albanians, but he strongly pointed that it did not matter whether Rome would accept the decision of the congress, what was worth was that Albanian people wanted and declared the Provisional Government through their delegates in the national meeting.

Vasil Dilo stated that the congress should not act independently. He supported this approach in several ways: first, the Albanian people were not ready and had not reached that degree of maturity as to shed blood for their country; second, it would be risky for Albania, considering this lack of readiness, to express political stands and operate independently; third, an independent movement will lead to the demolition of Albanian relations with the only friend it had, which was Italy. This attitude is reinforced by a debate he had with Mehdi Frashëri, expressing the opinion "we as delegates do not have the power to form a government".

But even the other side had strong arguments. Only an effective Albanian Government would serve as a center where Albanians could see real hope and the possibility of resolving the national question, while any sort of council or committee would be only a "feeble and ridiculous institution, leaving both free path to foreign intrigues". The existence of a committee will also give more freedom to Essad Toptani, because he was a strong and pragmatic opponent more than any other Albanian politician, he was one of the most powerful of the feudal class as for his military strength and financial means, and he armies were present and active along the borders at the time of the congress. The platform of creating an Albanian Government prevailed and was made official.

On the morning of 26 December, Konica presented a memorandum to Lieutenant E. Lodi, explaining the government formation, first of all the importance that it had for devaluing any possible attempt of France and the Balkan states to call Essad Toptani delegates at the Peace Conference. This further was confirmed by a letter of Gurakuqi, which dates December 26, 1918. Among other things, he cautioned that there were only a theoretically independent Albanian state, relying morally on Italy. But the fact that was troubling Albania even more was that France and some Balkan countries already recognized Esad Pasha as head of the Albanian government in exile, proving that they would support his delegation in the Peace Conference. Lodi had already reported to Rome that despite his effort for influencing the congress to elect only and Executive Committee, the "strong fraction" would prevail.

== Italian reaction ==
The foreign policy of Italy was focused on the political situation in Albania. Therefore, Sonnino sent a telegram to the supreme commander of Italian Forces in the Balkans, Settimo Piacentini on December 29, 1918, asking to be informed on how the discussions were going, and how the delegates managed to create the Provisional Government in contradiction with Italian expectations. He also advised to carefully consider the factual and legal relations between the occupying military authorities and the newly created governing body. Sonnino later would recognize the authorities and the composition of the Provisional Government created, though fearing any controversy by the Great Powers.

== Outcome ==
In addition to establishing the Albanian Provisional Government, the congress defined an initial delegation which would represent Albania in the Peace Conference in Paris. The head of the delegation would be Turhan Pasha, and as members Luigj Bumçi, Mehmet Konica, Mihal Turtulli, and Mit'hat Frashëri. (The list would change later, other names would come and go during various stages of the Conference, including Christo Dako, Parashqevi Qiriazi, Edith Durham, Sotir Kolea, Gjergj Fishta as Secretary General, etc.) All members of the initial delegation came from within the government. Moreover, the congress expressed its disapproval and concern regarding the outcome of the Treaty of London (1915), through two basic issues related to Albania.

First, on the political level, through the creation of the government, Albanians rejected the Italian protectorate over Albania with representation by the state of Italy in relations with the world, as was contemplated in section VII of the Treaty. Congress restated that the majority of the decisions of the London Conference of 1912–13 were intact, along with the full sovereignty of the Albanian state already formed.

Second, it rejected any decision affecting Albanian territories. The delegates expressed bitterness over this point VI of the Treaty, by which it recognized Italian sovereignty over Valona, as well as to point VII, under which Italy would not oppose the passage of southern and most northern Albania to Greece and Serbia - Montenegro, in case this would have been also required by other signatories of the Treaty, as France and/or England.
The congress rejected point V as well, which accepted the existence of a "Muslim" Albanian state in central Albania.
Another critic went to the Italians for creating obstacles for Vlora delegates to be part of the congress. In the same sense also addressed other provinces, which were unable to be represented. It was strongly emphasized that these territories be considered part of the Albanian state.

== Government of Durrës ==
The composition of government was proposed since the first session of the meetings.

Government of the Principality of Albania: 28 December 1918 – 28 January 1920:

- Turhan Pasha Përmeti - Head of State and Prime Minister of Albania
- Prenk Bib Doda - Deputy Prime Minister
- Mufid Libohova - Deputy Prime Minister and Minister without portfolio
- Monsignor Luigj Bumçi - Minister without portfolio
- Mustafa Merlika-Kruja - Minister of Posts and Telegraphs
- Mihal Turtulli - Minister without portfolio
- Mehmed Konica - Minister of Foreign Affairs
- Sami Vrioni - Minister of Agriculture
- Mid'hat Frashëri - Minister without portfolio
- Luigj Gurakuqi - Minister of Education
- Lef Nosi - Minister of National Economy (short time)
- Mehdi Frashëri - Minister of the Interior
- Fejzi Alizoti - Minister of Finances
- Petro Poga - Minister of Justice

== Governmental programme ==
The congress drafted a general political programme, which focused in three main directions: maintaining the independence and sovereignty of the Albanian state, the territorial integrity of the state and the revision of the 1913 ethnic borders, and internal order. Regarding the controversial issues related to the legal status of the state and political preferences towards any war-winning force, which had brought up enough disagreements and discussions, an internal silent agreement took place without being officialized.
Despite the decisions taken, Albania was still under foreign occupation.

== Aftermath ==
=== Attitude towards the Congress of Lushnjë ===
The new government did not last long, which was expected considering the turbulent years of 1918–1919. But the event held immediately after World War I showed the continuity of the Albanian state, which was put in doubt after the departure of Prince Wied. A little more than a year later, another congress was organized in Lushnjë. This one would bring at a higher level the institutionalization of the Albanian state, giving it a constitution and a government, although the head of state issue was still pending.
No the all old-cast Albanian leadership of Durrës would show friendly feelings towards the new event. According to Sejfi Vllamasi's (1883–1975) memories there were serious contradictions between the two camps. These include the assassination of the Prefect of Durrës (and delegate to Lushnjë) Abdyl Ypi (1876–1920) by Sul Mërlika, himself cousin of Mustafa Mërlika-Kruja, the prohibition of Krujë delegates to join the congress, the attempts to stop the delegates of Committee for the National Defence of Kosovo by Mërlika-Kruja, as well as failed attempts of Fejzi Alizoti and Myfid Libohova to stop other delegates from north and south of the country even involving Italian militia. Nevertheless, the Government of Durrës resigned right before its start, on January 29, 1920, allowing the continuation of the political consolidation of the country.

=== Part of the Albanian history ===
The Congress of Durrës is considered an important step in the Albanian state-forming process. A full assessment on the program of the government is still missing. The Albanian historiography after World War II took a critical attitude towards it, its key leaders, and the pro-Italian spirit that characterized it. Specifically, the critics went to Pan-Albanian Federation of America (Vatra), considered one of the strong pillars of Albanian nationalism, which compromised with Italy regarding the formation of the government of Durrës. The Albanian government that was created was considered "a little more than an Italian puppet".

A retrospective view shows that perhaps that was a right attitude. The agreements that came out were a consequence of historical circumstances that changed at the end of the war, such as disruption of equilibrium in the Balkans as a result of the dissolution of the Austro-Hungarian Empire.

== See also ==
- Principality of Albania
- Congress of Lushnjë
- Albanian Kingdom (1939–43)
