= Principality of Albania =

Monarchy in Albania from 1914 to 1920

Principality of Albania Principata e Shqipërisë (Albanian)
- 1914–1925; 1916–1918: Government-in-exile
- Flag Great Arms
- Motto: Atdheu mbi të gjitha "Homeland above all"
- Anthem: Himni i Flamurit "Hymn to the Flag"
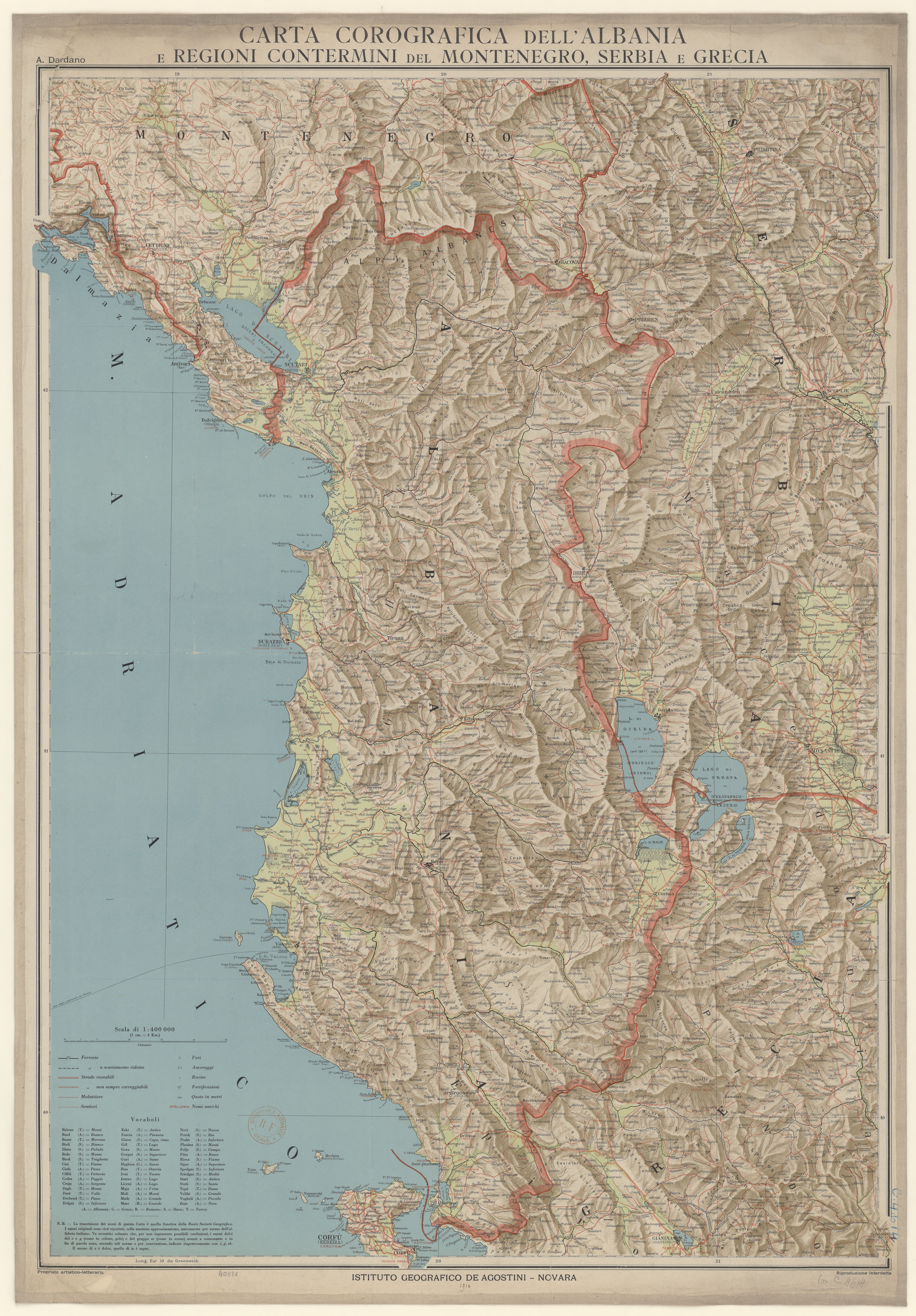
- The Principality of Albania in 1916
- Capital: Durrës (1914–20); Lushnjë (1920); Tirana (1920–24)
- Common languages: Albanian
- Religion: Islam, Christianity
- Demonym: Albanian
- Government: Constitutional monarchy
- Prince
  - 1914–1925: Wilhelm I
- Prime Minister
  - 1914 (first): Turhan Pasha Përmeti
  - 1925 (last): Ahmet Zogu
- Legislature: Parliament
- Historical era: WWI; Interwar Period
  - Established: 21 February 1914
  - Disestablished: 31 January 1925

Area
- 1916: 30,145 km^{2} (11,639 sq mi)

Population
  - 1916: Approx 979,000
- Currency: No official currency Greek drachma, gold franc, Italian lira used
Preceded by
Independent Albania
Republic of Central Albania
Succeeded by
1914: Senate of Central Albania
Northern Epirus
1925: Albanian Republic

Wilhelm, Prince of Albania

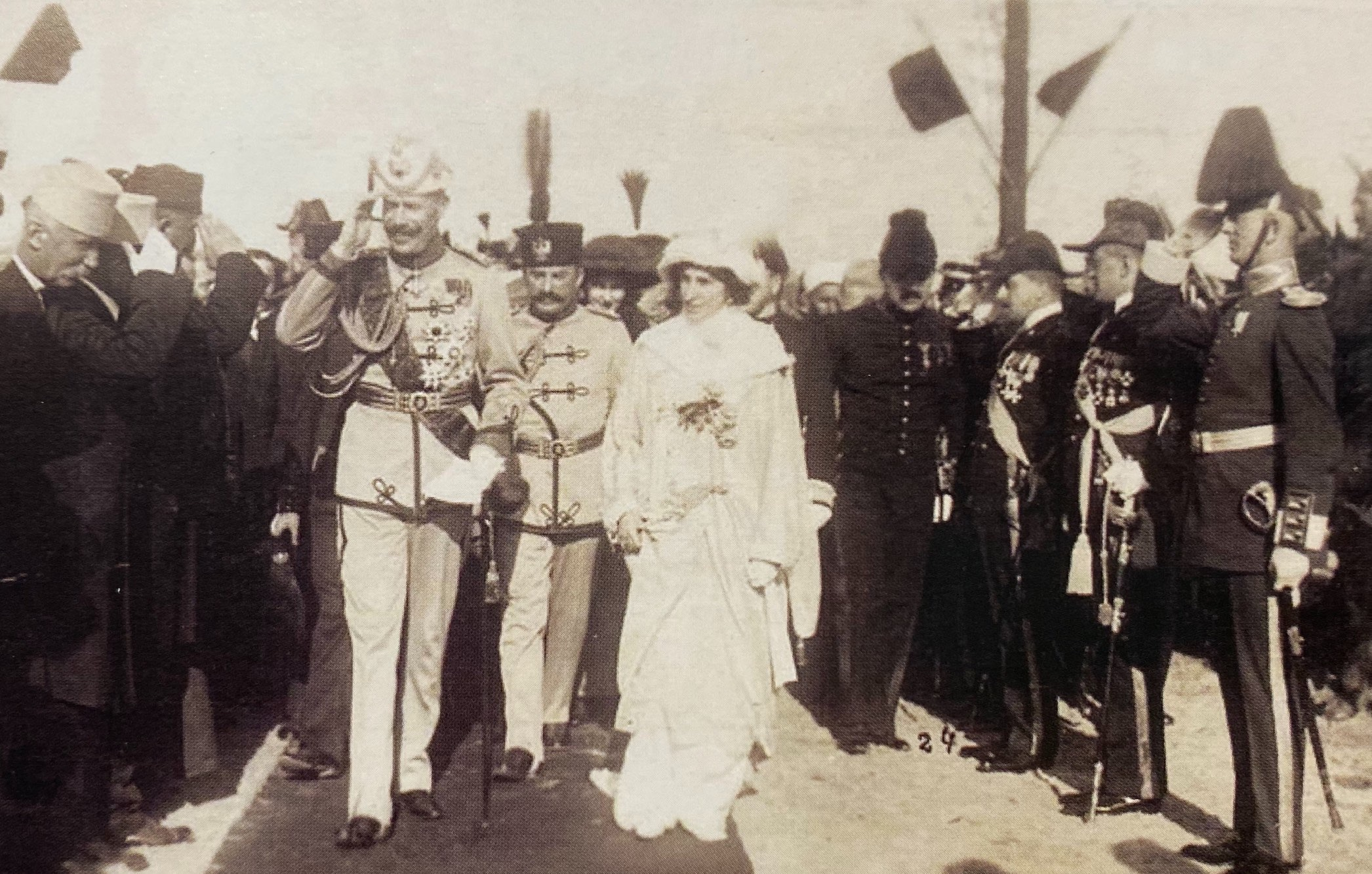
Wilhelm, Prince of Albania and his wife Princess Sophie of Albania arriving in Durrës, Albania, on 7 March 1914

The Principality of Albania (Albanian: Principata e Shqipërisë) was a monarchy from 1914 to 1925. It was headed by Wilhelm, Prince of Albania, and located in modern Albania in the Balkan region of Europe. The Ottoman Empire owned the land until the First Balkan War (1912—1913), which ended in the Treaty of London that formed the principality. The Principality of Albania survived invasions during World War I (1914–1918) and subsequent disputes over Albanian independence during the Paris Peace Conference (1919–1920). In 1925, the monarchy was abolished and the Albanian Republic (1925–1928), a parliamentary republic and dictatorship, was declared.

== History ==
=== Establishment and collapse ===
After the fall of Constantinople, the land area covered by modern Albania had been under Ottoman rule from around 1478. The Great Powers recognized the independence of Albania in the Treaty of London in May 1913 and the Principality was established on February 21, 1914. The Great Powers selected Prince Wilhelm of Wied, a nephew of Queen Elisabeth of Romania, to become the sovereign of the newly independent Albania. A formal offer was made by 18 Albanian delegates representing the 18 districts of Albania on February 21, 1914, an offer which he accepted. Outside of Albania Wilhelm was styled prince, but in Albania he was referred to as king so as not to seem inferior to the king of Montenegro. The first government under the rule of the House of Wied was a kind of "princes privy council" because of its members, who were representatives of the Albanian nobility: Prince Turhan Pasha Përmeti (former Governor of Crete and ambassador of the Ottoman Empire at Saint Petersburg), Aziz Pasha Vrioni, Prince Bib Doda Pasha of Gjomarkaj-Mirdita, Prince Essad Pasha Toptani, Prince George Adamidi bey Frashëri, Mihal Turtulli bey Korça, and others.

The Principality of Albania in 1914.

Prince Wilhelm arrived in Albania at his provisional capital of Durrës on March 7, 1914, along with the royal family. The security of Albania was to be provided by an International Gendarmerie commanded by Dutch officers. Wilhelm left Albania on September 3, 1914, following the Peasant Revolt initiated by Essad Pasha and later headed by Haxhi Qamili, the latter the military commander of the "Muslim State of Central Albania" centered in Tirana. Wilhelm never renounced his claim to the throne.

In the spring of 1914, the Autonomous Republic of Northern Epirus was proclaimed by ethnic Greeks in the territory and recognized by the Albanian government, though it proved short-lived as Albania collapsed with the onset of World War I.

=== World War I ===
World War I interrupted all government activities in Albania, and the country was split into a number of regional governments. Political chaos engulfed Albania after the outbreak of World War I. Surrounded by insurgents in Durrës, Prince Wilhelm departed the country in September 1914, just six months after arriving, and subsequently joined the German army and served on the Eastern Front. The Albanian people split along religious and tribal lines after the prince's departure. Muslims demanded a Muslim prince and looked to the Ottoman Empire as the protector of the privileges they had enjoyed. Many beys and clan chiefs recognized no superior authority. In late October 1914, Greek forces entered Albania in the Protocol of Corfu's recognized Autonomous Republic of Northern Epirus. Italy occupied Vlorë, and Serbia and Montenegro occupied parts of northern Albania until a Central Powers offensive scattered the Serbian army, which was evacuated by the French to Thessaloniki. Austro-Hungarian and Bulgarian forces then occupied about two-thirds of the country.

Under the secret Treaty of London signed in April 1915, Triple Entente powers promised Italy that it would gain Vlorë and nearby lands and a protectorate over Albania in exchange for entering the war against Austria-Hungary. Serbia and Montenegro were promised much of northern Albania, and Greece was promised much of the country's southern half. The treaty was to leave a tiny Albanian state that would be represented by Italy in its relations with the other major powers, thus meaning it would have no foreign policy. In September 1918, the Entente forces broke through the Central Powers' lines north of Thessaloniki, and within days Austro-Hungarian forces began to withdraw from Albania. When the war ended on November 11, 1918, Italy's army had occupied most of Albania, Serbia held much of the country's northern mountains, Greece occupied a sliver of land within Albania's 1913 borders; and French forces occupied Korçë and Shkodër as well as other regions with sizable Albanian populations such as Kosovo, remained part of Serbia.

=== Re-emergence ===
Albania's political confusion continued in the wake of World War I. The country lacked a single recognized government, and Albanians feared, with justification, that Italy, Yugoslavia, and Greece would succeed in extinguishing Albania's independence and carve up the country. Italian forces controlled Albanian political activity in the areas they occupied. The Serbs, who largely dictated Yugoslavia's foreign policy, strove to take over northern Albania, and the Greeks sought to control southern Albania.

A delegation sent by a postwar Albanian National Assembly that met at Durrës in December 1918 defended Albanian interests at the Paris Peace Conference, but the conference denied Albania official representation. The National Assembly, anxious to keep Albania intact, expressed willingness to accept Italian protection and even an Italian prince as a ruler so long as it would mean Albania did not lose territory. Serbian troops conducted actions in Albanian-populated border areas, while Albanian guerrillas operated in both Serbia and Montenegro.

In January 1920, at the Paris Peace Conference, negotiators from France, Britain, and Greece agreed to divide Albania among Yugoslavia, Italy, and Greece as a diplomatic expedient aimed at finding a compromise solution to the territorial conflict between Italy and Yugoslavia. The deal was done behind the Albanians' backs and in the absence of a United States negotiator.

Members of a second Albanian National Assembly held at Lushnjë in January 1920 rejected the partition plan and warned that Albanians would take up arms to defend their country's independence and territorial integrity. The Lushnjë National Assembly appointed a four-man regency to rule the country. A bicameral parliament was also created, in which an elected lower chamber, the Chamber of Deputies (with one deputy for every 12,000 people in Albania and one for the Albanian community in the United States), appointed members of its own ranks to an upper chamber, the Senate. In February 1920, the government moved to Tirana, which became Albania's capital.

One month later, in March 1920, U.S. President Woodrow Wilson intervened to block the Paris agreement. The United States underscored its support for Albania's independence by recognizing an official Albanian representative to Washington, and on December 17, 1920, the League of Nations recognized Albania's sovereignty by admitting it as a full member. The country's borders, however, remained unsettled.

Albania's new government campaigned to end Italy's occupation of the country and encouraged peasants to harass Italian forces. In September 1920, after the Battle of Vlora, where Italian-occupied Vlorë was besieged by Albanian forces, Rome abandoned its claims on Albania under the Treaty of London and withdrew its forces from all of Albania except Sazan Island at the mouth of Vlorë Bay.

=== Mirdita Republic ===
Yugoslavia continued to pursue a predatory policy toward Albania, and after Albanian tribesmen clashed with Yugoslav forces occupying the northern part of the country, Yugoslav troops escalated their campaign in the area. Belgrade then backed a disgruntled Gheg clan chief, Gjon Markagjoni, who led his Roman Catholic Mirditë tribesmen in a rebellion against the regency and parliament. Markagjoni proclaimed the founding of an independent "Republic of Mirdita". As a result of this, in October 1921, the Sacred Union Government was created to pressure Yugoslavia to recognize Albania's territorial sovereignty.

Finally, in November 1921, Yugoslav troops invaded Albanian territory beyond the areas they were already occupying. The League of Nations dispatched a commission composed of representatives of Britain, France, Italy, and Japan that reaffirmed Albania's 1913 borders. Yugoslavia complained bitterly but had no choice but to withdraw its troops. The Republic of Mirdita was dissolved.

== Political situation ==
Interwar Albanian governments appeared and disappeared in rapid succession. Between July and December 1921 alone, the premiership changed hands five times.

=== Congress of Lushnjë ===
The Congress of Lushnjë (Albanian: Kongresi i Lushnjës) was held in five sessions on January 27-January 31, 1920, in Lushnjë by Albanian nationalists and had as its goal the study of the Albanian situation and the measures to be adopted in order to save Albania from being partitioned among other countries after World War I. The Congress was held in the house of Kaso Fuga and it comprised delegates from all of Albania. Aqif Pashë Elbasani was elected as speaker of the Congress as he was held in high regard as a great patriot. It established the High Council (Këshilli i Lartë), the National Council (Këshillin Kombëtar), and moved the capital from Lushnjë to Tirana.

The High Council was made up of Luigj Bumçi, Aqif Pashë Elbasani, Abdi Toptani, and Dr. Mihal Turtulli who would perform the function of the leaders of the new Albanian state, whereas the National Council would function as the Parliament.

The new government that was created was:
Sulejman Delvina – Prime minister
Ahmet Zogu was elected Minister of Internal Affairs
Mehmed Konica – Minister of Foreign Affairs
Hoxha Kadri – Minister of Justice
Ndoc Çoba – Minister of Finance, Sotir Peçi – Minister of Education
Ali Riza Kolonja – Minister of War
Eshref Frashëri – General Director of World Affairs
Idhomen Kosturi – General Director of the Post-Telegraph Agency.

=== Political parties ===
Albania's first political parties emerged only after World War I. Even more than in other parts of the Balkans, political parties were evanescent gatherings centered on prominent persons who created temporary alliances to achieve their personal aims. The major conservative party, the Progressive Party, attracted some northern clan chiefs and prominent Muslim landholders of southern Albania whose main platform was firm opposition to any agricultural reform program that would transfer their lands to the peasantry.

The country's biggest landowner, Shefqet Bej Vërlaci, led the Progressive Party. The Popular Party's ranks included the reform-minded Orthodox bishop of Durrës, Fan Noli, who was imbued with Western ideas at his alma mater, Harvard University, and had even translated Shakespeare and Ibsen into Albanian. The Popular Party also included Ahmed Zogu, the twenty-four-year-old son of the chief of the Mati, a Northern Albanian clan. The future King Zog drew his support from some northern clans and kept an armed gang in his service, but many Geg clan leaders refused to support either main party.

The Popular Party's head, Xhafer Ypi, formed a government in December 1921 with Noli as foreign minister and Zogu as internal affairs minister, but Noli resigned soon after Zogu resorted to repression in an attempt to disarm the lowland Albanians despite the fact that bearing arms was a traditional custom.

=== Zogu government ===
When the government's enemies attacked Tirana in early 1922, Zogu stayed in the capital and, with the support of the British ambassador, repulsed the assault. He took over the premiership later in the year and turned his back on the Popular Party by announcing his engagement to the daughter of the Progressive Party leader, Shefqet Verlaci.

Zogu's protégés organized themselves into the Government Party. Noli and other Western-oriented leaders formed the Opposition Party of Democrats, which attracted all of Zogu's many personal enemies, ideological opponents, and people left unrewarded by his political machine. Ideologically, the Democrats included a broad sweep of people who advocated everything from conservative Islam to Noli's dreams of rapid modernization.

Opposition to Zogu was formidable. Orthodox peasants in Albania's southern lowlands loathed Zogu because he supported the Muslim landowners' efforts to block land reform; Shkodër's citizens felt shortchanged because their city did not become Albania's capital, and nationalists were dissatisfied because Zogu's government did not press Albania's claims to Kosovo or speak up more energetically for the rights of the ethnic Albanian minorities in Yugoslavia (Kosovo, southern Serbia and Vardar Macedonia) and Greece.

Zogu's party handily won elections for a National Assembly in early 1924. Zogu soon stepped aside, however, handing over the premiership to Verlaci in the wake of a financial scandal and an assassination attempt by a young radical that left Zogu wounded. The opposition withdrew from the assembly after the leader of a radical youth organization, Avni Rustemi, was murdered in the street outside the parliament building.

=== Noli's government ===
Noli's supporters blamed the murder on Zogu's Mati clansmen, who continued to practice blood vengeance. After the walkout, discontent mounted, and in June 1924 a peasant-backed insurgency had won control of Tirana. Noli became prime minister, and Zogu fled to Yugoslavia.

Fan Noli, an idealist, rejected demands for new elections on the grounds that Albania needed a "paternal" government. In a manifesto describing his government's program, Noli called for abolishing feudalism, resisting Italian domination, and establishing a Western-style constitutional government. Scaling back the bureaucracy, strengthening local government, assisting peasants, throwing Albania open to foreign investment, and improving the country's bleak transportation, public health, and education facilities filled out the Noli government's overly ambitious agenda. Noli encountered resistance to his program from people who had helped him oust Zogu, and he never attracted the foreign aid necessary to carry out his reform plans. Noli criticized the League of Nations for failing to settle the threat facing Albania on its land borders.

Under Fan Noli, the government set up a special tribunal that passed death sentences, in absentia, on Zogu, Verlaci, and others and confiscated their property. In Yugoslavia Zogu recruited a mercenary army, and Belgrade furnished the Albanian leader with weapons, about 1,000 Yugoslav army regulars, and Russian White émigrés to mount an invasion that the Serbs hoped would bring them disputed areas along the border. After Noli's regime decided to establish diplomatic relations with the Soviet Union, a bitter enemy of the Serbian ruling family, Belgrade began making wild allegations that the Albanian regime was about to embrace Bolshevism. On December 13, 1924, Zogu's Yugoslav-backed army crossed into Albanian territory. By Christmas Eve, Zogu had reclaimed the capital, and Noli and his government had fled to Italy. But his government lasted just six months, and Ahmet Zogu returned with another coup d'état and regained the control, changing the political situation and abolishing the principality.

== Economy ==
Upon the independence of Albania from Turkey in 1912, as in all other fields, the customs administration continued its operation under legislation approved specifically for the procedure. With the new laws were issued for the operation of customs duty was 11% of the value of goods imported and 1% on the value of those exported.

At the time of the interim government of Vlora, in 1912–1913 there has been no other change on this duty, except the import tax on tobacco, which at the time was added up to 30%, which became an order of the Ministry of Finance at the time, but that does not say that on which the law rested. For the period 1913–1914, when the government was in power Durrës, although lacking formal notices to all customs fees, it is known that there was nothing changed from that of 1912–1913. So, until 1914 there was no change in customs regulations. Similarly, from 1914 until 1918 that the First World War continued and Albania was occupied sections by foreign powers, customs regulations functioned under laws that implement the relevant commands to foreign armies that were present in Albania (Italians, French, Austro-Hungarians, etc.), which occasionally modified. Commands Austro-Hungarian armies and French (with the exception of any modification), made no change in the applicable customs legislation inherited from the government of Durrës 1914, while the Austro-Hungarian command center in Shkodër, in 1916 brought a decision on the curb, which consisted of eight articles. In the first article stated: "The word contraband, we learn that the sale of cntrabanded things, causes damage on the Treasury or the people. Damtime trigger ". Likewise, the French command of Korçë took a decision to increase the fee (trails) customs. This decision, which was printed in Albanian and French, consisting of 11 articles and was signed by French General H. Salle, commander of troops in who were installed on Maliq. According to the state archives found in Korçë, after two years (15 March 1920), this command issued another regulation, known as "Regulation Oktrovës" and was signed by the commander of the Albanian borders, Cretin. To regulate the customs service, after 1920, began functioning as separate offices in Vlora (Director customs), Korçë (Director of Oktrovës) in Shkodër and Lezhë with customs Kryedrejtori. The latter, in 1920, moved to Durrës and Tirana later. It kryedrejtori customs headed by Ahmed Boriçi and operated independent from the Ministry of Finance, was abolished in 1923. Since 1920, when the government came to power out of the Congress of Lushnjë until 1934 (at which time the study was done Hajj Shkoza author), the Albanian national administration, along with the development of all its activities in different branches economy, was also involved in the organization of the customs system. As originally drafted specific provisions on exports of grain and other products to local products, something which once made the decisions of the Council of Ministers and times of special laws decree issued by the government (in cases when the country needed bread due to the lack of grain). But when the products were successful and met all the needs of the country, farmers and grain traders were selling these exported out of them. From 1912 to 1939, the Albanian customs legislation was constantly being improved, reaching the most advanced countries of the West. It did at the time of our trade with foreign countries take the unprecedented growth. This continued well into the war years 1939–1944, after Italy, for propaganda purposes, liberalized trade with Albania, enabling you to our country pouring wholesale goods. As a result, even to this day remember the phrase: "as long Abundance of Italy".

== Social conditions ==
Extraordinarily undeveloped, the Albania that emerged after World War I was home to something fewer than a million people divided into three major religious groups and two distinct classes: those people who owned land and claimed semifeudal privileges and those who did not. The landowners had always held the principal ruling posts in the country's central and southern regions, but many of them were steeped in the same conservatism that brought decay to the Ottoman Empire. The landowning elite expected that they would continue to enjoy precedence, but the country's peasants were beginning to dispute the landed aristocracy's control.

In northern Albania, the government directly controlled only Shkodër and its environs. The highland clans were suspicious of a constitutional government claiming to legislate in the interests of the country as a whole, and the Roman Catholic Church became the principal link between Tirana and the tribesmen despite the Muslim religious affiliation of most of the population. In many instances, administrative communications were addressed to priests for circulation among their parishioners.

== Religion ==
During this period Albanian religions got independence. The ecumenical patriarch of Constantinople recognized the autocephaly of the Albanian Orthodox Church after a meeting of the country's Albanian Orthodox congregations in Berat in August 1922. The most energetic reformers in Albania came from the Orthodox population who wanted to see Albania move quickly away from its Turkish-ruled past, during which Christians made up the underclass. Albania's conservative Sunni Muslim community broke its last ties with Constantinople in 1923, formally declaring that there had been no caliph since Muhammad himself and that Muslim Albanians pledged primary allegiance to their native country. The Muslims also banned polygamy and allowed women to choose whether or not to wear a veil.

== See also ==
- Kingdom of Albania (1928–39)
- List of Albanian monarchs
