= Gaqo Adhamidhi =

Albanian diplomat and doctor (1859–1839)

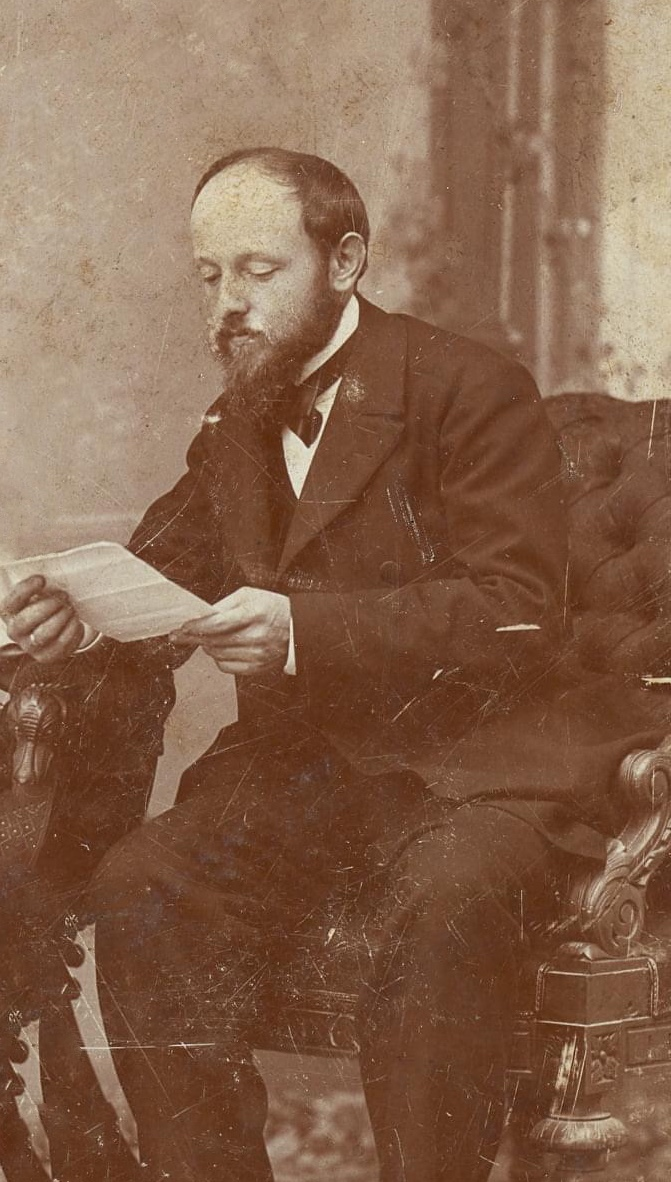
- Born: Gaqo Adhamidhi; 1859; Korçë, Ottoman Albania
- Died: 1939 (aged 79–80)
- Occupation: Physician
- Known for: Albanian representative in the League of Nations "Dr. Adhamuti" personage

Gaqo Adhamidhi or Adamidi (1859–1939), also referred to as Adhamidh Frashëri, was an Albanian physician and political figure during the early 20th century.

== Life ==
Adhamidhi was born in Korçë, back then Ottoman Empire, today's Albania. Like most of the members of the Orthodox community there he emigrated at a young age. He settled in Egypt, where he studied medicine and became a physician. Adamidi was a close friend of the physician and politician Mihal Turtulli, another prominent member from the ranks of the Albanian community of Egypt.

Adhamidhi served during 1892–1914 as personal doctor of Abbas II of Egypt, the last khedive of Egypt and Sudan from the dynasty of Muhammad Ali. During his time in Egypt, Adhamidi attempted and failed to establish cooperation between the Albanian community residing there with the one based in Romania. In 1914, following the events of the Albanian Declaration of Independence and the newly created Albanian state, Adhamidhi returned to Albania where he served as Minister of Finance in the cabinet of 1914 (resigned on 20 May 1914) headed by Turhan Pasha Përmeti, the first government of the Principality of Albania. With the outbreak of World War I he settled in Switzerland, associating with the University of Lausanne. He stayed many years in Switzerland, becoming chairman of the "Albanian National Council" there, a political society of the Albanian diaspora in Geneva. He also represented Albania in the League of Nations.

== As a personage ==
It is accepted that the Albanian poet and playwright Andon Çako, better known as Andon Zako Çajupi, one of the prominent activists of the Albanian National Awakening, based his comic personage "Dr. Adhamuti" of his comedy Klubi i Selanikut (Thessaloniki's Club) based on George Adhamidhi. The reason was personal vendetta from a Zako's matchmaking gone bad, for which he might have accused Adhamidhi. Inside Zako's satirical story, Dr. Adhamudhi is described as a grotesque, penny-pinching, ignorant, pro-Ottoman, pseudo-physician.
