= Mufid Libohova =

Albanian economist, diplomat and politician

Mufid Libohova Bey
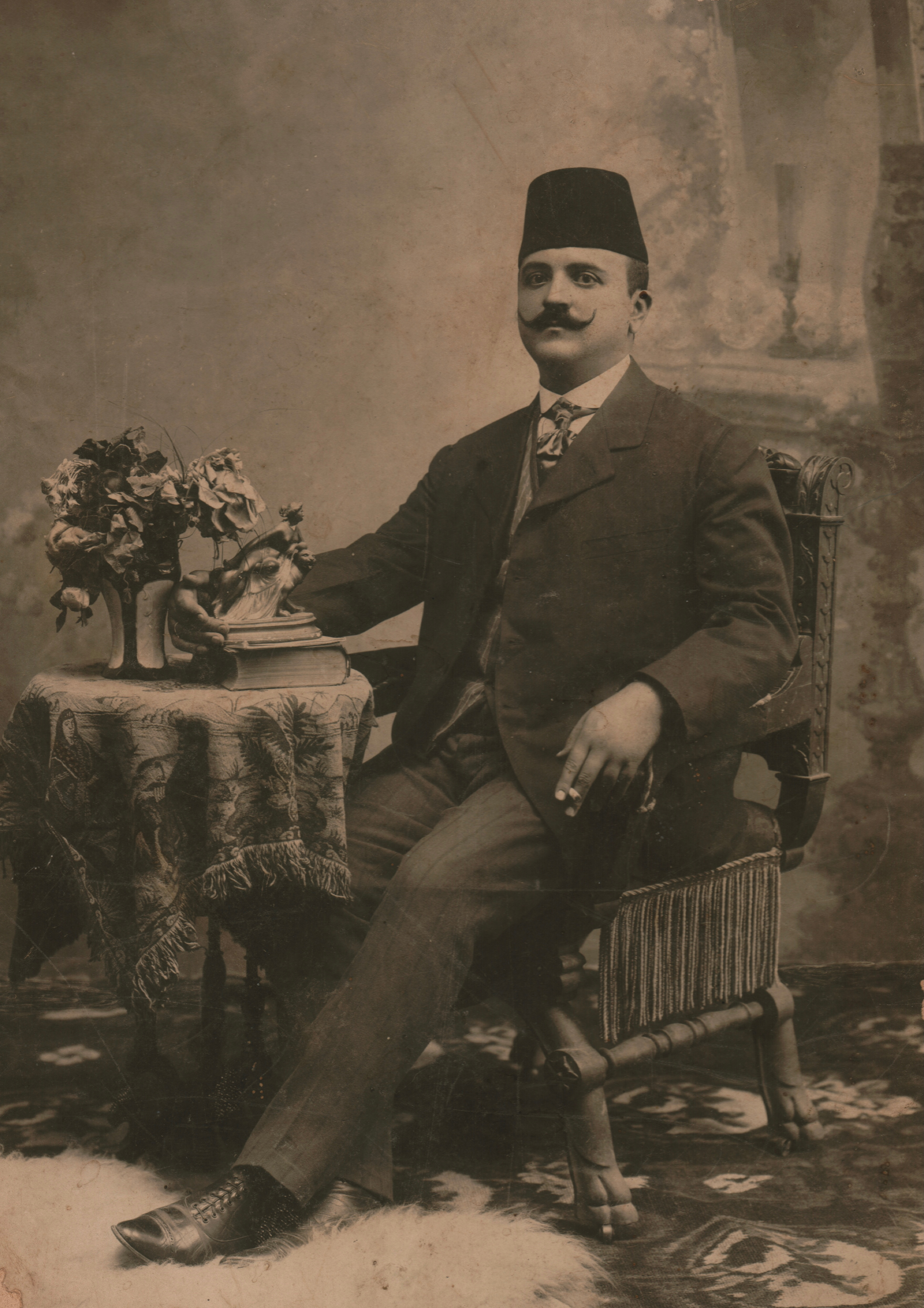
- Libohova, c. 1910s

2nd, 5th, 17th and 18th Minister of Foreign Affairs (Albania)
- In office 6 January 1925 – 31 January 1925 and 1 March 1925 – 23 September 1925
- Prime Minister: Ahmet Zogu
- Preceded by: Iliaz Vrioni
- Succeeded by: Hysen Vrioni
- In office 25 December 1918 – 29 January 1920
- Prime Minister: Turhan Përmeti
- Preceded by: Prênk Bibë Doda
- Succeeded by: Mehmet Konica
- In office 1 June 1913 – 24 January 1914
- Prime Minister: Ismail Qemali
- Preceded by: Ismail Qemali
- Succeeded by: Turhan Përmeti

Member of the Chamber of Deputies in the General Assembly of the Ottoman Empire
- In office 23 December 1908 – 17 January 1912
- Sultan: Abdülhamid II; Mehmed V
- Grand Vizier: Kâmil Pasha; Hüseyin Hilmi Pasha; Ahmet Tevfik Pasha; Ibrahim Hakki Pasha; Mehmed Said Pasha
- Constituency: Sanjak of Delvina
- In office 18 April 1912 – 5 August 1912
- Sultan: Mehmed V
- Grand Vizier: Mehmed Said Pasha
- Constituency: Sanjak of Delvina

Personal details
- Born: July 1876 Libohovë, Janina Vilayet, Ottoman Empire (modern Albania)
- Died: 10 February 1927 (aged 50) Sarandë, Albania
- Spouse: Olga Schweitzer
- Relations: Maliq Naili Pasha Bey (Grandfather)
- Children: Malik bey Libohova (Son), Elmaz bey Libohova (Son)
- Parent(s): Ali Naki Bey (Father), Behixhe Hamza (Mother)
- Known for: First Minister of Interior of Albania; Lek - Albanian currency First ambassador of Albania to Italy

Mufid Bey Libohova (1876 in Libohovë – 1927 in Sarandë) was an Albanian economist, diplomat and politician and one of the delegates at the Assembly of Vlorë (28 November 1912) where the Albanian Declaration of Independence took place. He served as the first Minister of Interior of Albania, during the Provisional Government of Albania. He held different government positions on nine occasions between 1913–1927, holding the positions of Justice Minister, Minister of the Interior, Minister of Finances, and Minister of Culture.

== Life ==
Mufid Libohova, son of Ali Naki Bey (1842-1904), and the grandson of Maliq Naili Pasha Bey (1810-1892), two Albanian notables from Libohova. Mufid was of was scion of a wealthy landowning family. His mother was Behixhe Hamza, a Circassian from Tuapse. She was the sister of the third wife of Mehmet Ali Vrioni. In 1898, Mufid was appointed in the Ottoman Embassy in Brussels, where he became Chargé d'affaires. He served initially in the Ottoman administration and represented Kaza of Gjirokastër, Sanjak of Delvina as a deputy in the 1908 parliament of the Young Turks. As an Ottoman parliamentarian Libohova was outspoken on Albanian issues and an example of this was a verbal exchange triggered when he mentioned the word Arnavutlar (Albanians). The Ottoman speaker Ahmed Riza responded "There are no Albanians; there are only Ottomans" to which Libohova replied that "Yes sir, there are Albanians". During his time in Ottoman politics, Libohova was a close ally of fellow Albanian parliamentarian Ismail Qemali. Like some educated Albanians with nationalist sentiments of the time, Libohova supported the unity of Albanians from different religions under the banner of Skanderbeg and was in favour of government reforms that benefited Albanians.

At the eve of the First World War, he was member of the International Control Commission that governed Albania from 22 January – 7 March 1914. Mufid Bey (also written Myfit Bey) was among the chief promoters of the Congress of Durrës that led, on 25 December 1918, to the creation of a new provisional government headed by former Prime Minister Turhan Pasha. Mufid Bey took over the ministry of the interior and justice, and later became minister of foreign affairs. In April 1919 he left Albania to take part the Paris Peace Conference and to attend to Albanian interests there. In August 1919, on his return from Paris, he stopped over in Rome. During negotiations with the Italian government, he secured Italian recognition for Albanian independence and a promise that the Italian occupation of Vlora would be temporary. It is this turbulent period of Albanian history that Mufid Bey Libohova describes in his memoirs, Politika ime ndë Shqiperi, 1916-1920 ("My Policies in Albania, 1916–1920").

Libohova would be an opponent of the Congress of Lushnje event of 1920, as part of the old-case government of Durrës together with Mustafa Merlika-Kruja, Fejzi Alizoti, and Sami Vrioni. According to Sejfi Vllamasi's (1883–1975) memories they would try to prohibit the delegates from reaching Lushnje, sometimes convincing them not to and sometimes forcefully preventing them. The opposition would culminate with the assassination of the Prefect of Durrës (and delegate to Lushnjë) Abdyl Ypi (1876-1920) by Sul Mërlika, himself cousin of Mustafa Mërlika-Kruja.

In addition, he was an Albanian government member on nine occasions from 1912 until his death in 1927, holding the positions of Justice Minister, Minister of the Interior, Minister of Finance, and Minister of Foreign Affairs.

A strong pro-Zog supporter, he returned to Albania from exile in Greece with his followers and financial support by the Greek government, and helped overthrow the government of Fan Noli a few months after the June Revolution.

Libohova is considered the father of the Albanian Lek, since he proposed the name and was the minister of Finance when the Lek was put into force. Libohova has been also member of International Control Commission, which was a provisional institution since the resignation of Ismail Qemali until the coronation of William, Prince of Albania, and the first ambassador of Albania to Italy.
Mufid Libohova was born in July 1876, Libohova, Ottoman Empire and died on 10 February 1927 in Sarandë, Albania. His first wife (married in 1898) was Sheref Hanëm Giritli Zade, a Turkish woman. His second wife Olga, of Danish origin, remained in Albania after his death. Libohova had two sons, Malik bey from the first marriage and Elmaz bey from the second one.

== See also ==
- Delegates of the Albanian Declaration of Independence
- Provisional Government of Albania
- List of Foreign Ministers of Albania

== Literature ==
- "History of Albanian People" Albanian Academy of Science.ISBN 99927-1-623-1
- O.S. Pearson, Albania and King Zog, I.B. Tauris. 2005 (ISBN 1-84511-013-7).
