= Turtulli =

Turtulli is a surname. Notable people with the surname include:

- Marvin Turtulli (born 1994), Albanian professional footballer
- Mihal Turtulli (1847–1935), Albanian oculist and politician
