= 1923 Albanian parliamentary election =

- November–December 1923
- All 102 seats in the Assembly; 52 seats needed for a majority
Party	Leader	Seats
Zogu faction	Ahmed Zogu	44
Opposition	Luigj Gurakuqi	39
Independents	–	19
This lists parties that won seats. See the complete results below.
Prime Minister before	Prime Minister after the election
Ahmet Zogu	Ahmet Zogu

Constituent Assembly elections were held in Albania in November and December 1923, with the second round taking place on 27 December.

== Background ==
During 1923 tensions had been building between religious groups, with Christians unhappy at former Ottoman officials continuing to take advantage of their position and taxes from the wealthier Christian parts of the country subsidising a government led by the Muslim Ahmet Zogu. Following several political assassinations, in August Zogu agreed to a Constituent Assembly being elected later in the year.

== Results ==
Following the elections, two political groups emerged, the so-called National Party (Partia Kombetare), supporting Ahmet Zogu and the opposition group led by Luigj Gurakuqi. Zogu's faction had won 44 seats and opposition candidates 39. The 19 independent candidates, most of whom were conservative, gave their support to Zogu, allowing him to form a government.

Opposition parties alleged there had been electoral fraud, claiming that their strong performance in the first round of voting should have led to them winning a majority in the second round. The Dielli newspaper reported that the government had terrorised the electors into voting for their candidates. According to a CIA Intelligence Report in August 1947, the 1923 elections were comparatively free and democratic.

== Aftermath ==
The new parliament convened for the first time on 21 January 1924. Although Zogu was narrowly re-elected as Prime Minister, he resigned two weeks later, allowing Shefqet Vërlaci to become head of government.
