= Congress of Lushnjë Museum =

Museum in Albania

Coordinates: 40°56′28″N 19°42′27″E

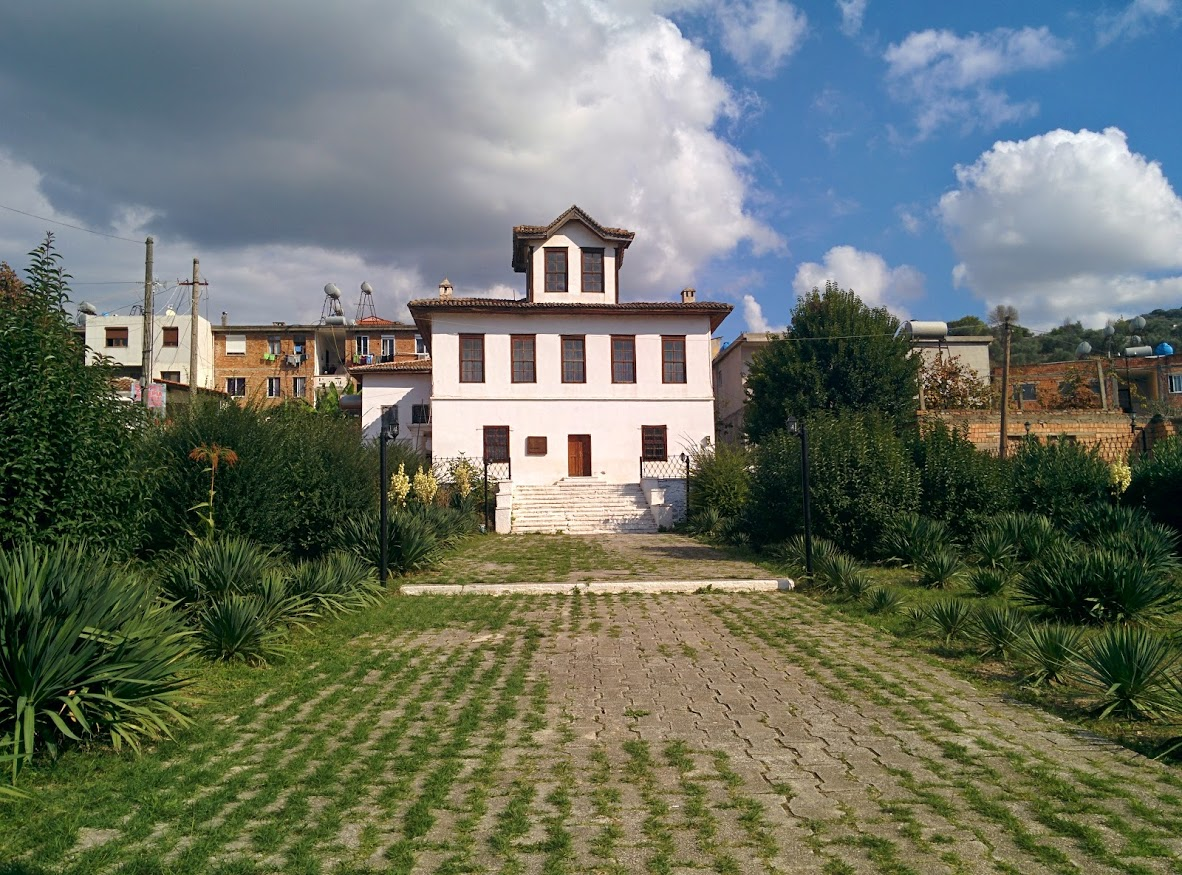
The building where the Congress was held

Congress of Lushnjë Museum (Albanian: Muzeu i Kongresit të Lushnjes) is a museum in Lushnjë, Albania. The Congress of Lushnjë was held here in 1920. In 1970, the building was turned into a museum devoted to patriotism. It contains numerous photographs and original documents related to Albania's struggle against Fascism. The white building has 5 bays on the middle floor and 2 bays on the top floor.
