= Josif Budo =

Albanian martyr (1968–1990)

- Born: 7 January 1968; Kavajë, Albania
- Died: 10 July 1990 (aged 22); Kavajë, Albania
- Cause of death: Assassinated
- Burial place: Varrezat e Kavajës

Josif Budo (7 January 1968 – 10 July 1990) was a young Albanian activist who became the first martyr of the anti-communist uprising in Albania. A street in his hometown Kavajë and in the borough of Tirana 10 in Tirana are named in his honour.
