= Chatin Sarachi =

Albanian painter and politician

Çatin Saraçi
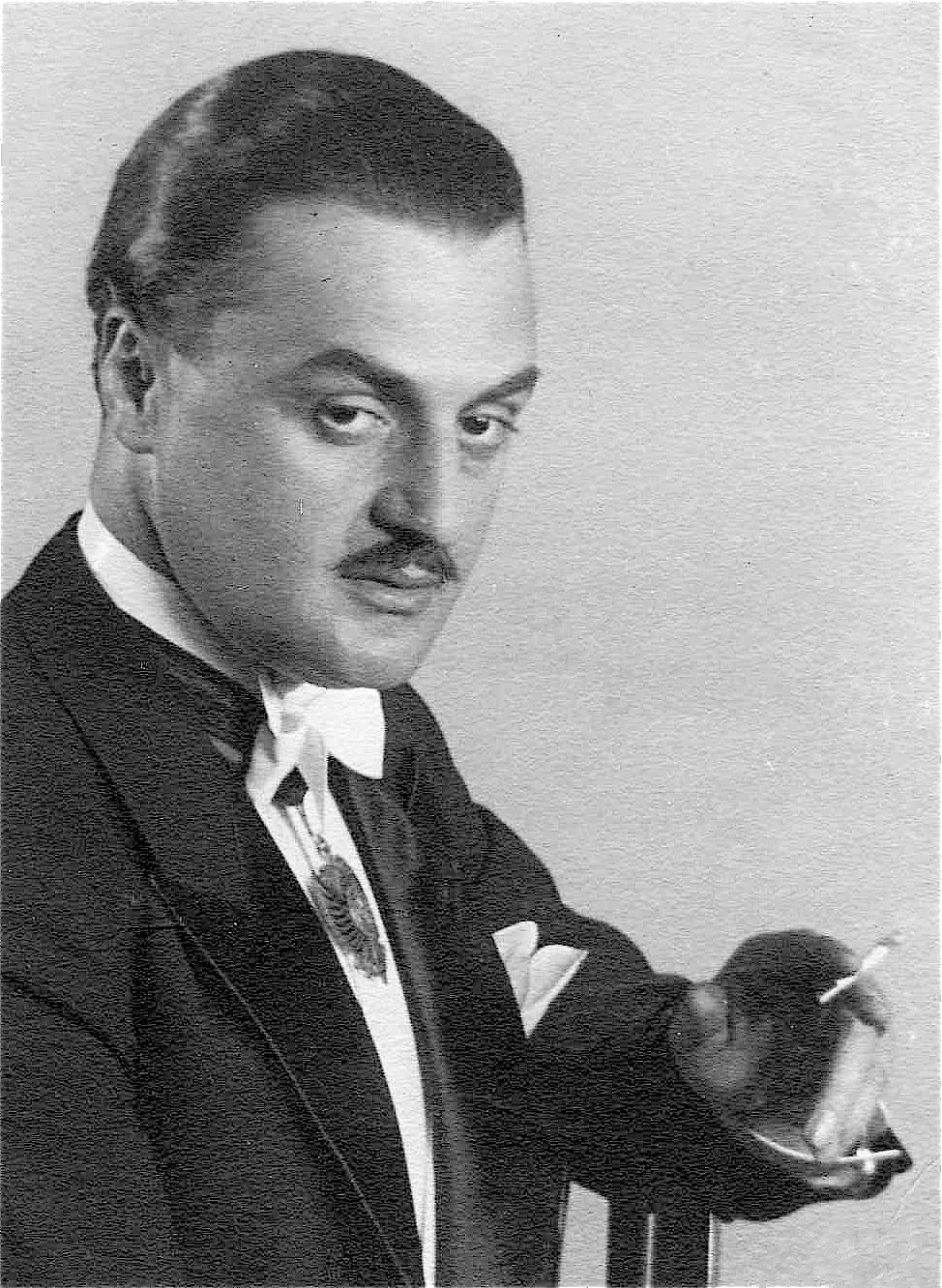
- Born: 14 June 1899; Shkodër, Scutari Vilayet, Ottoman Empire
- Died: 27 November 1974 (aged 75); London, England
- Occupations: Painter, diplomat

Chatin Sarachi (born Paskal Saraçi; 1899–1974), was an Albanian painter and politician. Chatin was born in a well-known family of trading traditions, in Shkodër, Ottoman Empire. He was brought up with an occidental mentality in an environment of European cultural roots. This influence, seems to have helped him in covering for a short period of time, a diplomatic position in the High Administration of King Zog the First.

His widow (Désirée) Elizabeth, whom he married on 5 December 1961, died on 2 November 2003.

Chatin Sarachi's marriage certificate states that he had been previously married but that that earlier marriage had been “annulled”. It also appears from the marriage certificate that he was born in 1899. His father Gjok Saraçi is said to have been a landowner. On the other hand, family sources refer to Chatin's father as a translator.

Sarachi's death certificate confirms 14 June 1899 as the date of his birth. He died on 27 November 1974.

He was a close friend of John St Aubyn, 4th Baron St Levan.

== Sarachi as a painter ==
Sarachi's and Kokoschka's studio in Stratford Road

Chatin Sarachi first went to England on a diplomatic mission in 1933. In fact, the occupation of Albania from the Italian army coincides with Chatin's position as First Secretary of the Albanian Embassy in London, where he became a well-known painter. Within a few years he had decided to remain in London and gave up his diplomatic career to concentrate on painting.

In 1939 Sarachi met the great expressionist artist Oskar Kokoschka. Kokoschka became a close friend and admirer of Sarachi as well as a constant influence on his work. They shared a Kensington studio in Stratford Road, not far from the Pride Gallery, and worked together leaving as a witness of their friendship, many drawings and paintings of each other.

In the press of that period, his name is mentioned among the best representatives of English Impressionism, including Oscar Kokoschka. The landscapes, the still lifes, and the flower paintings of Sarachi, exude a vibrant quality with a strictly personal use of colour and tone, achieved through his mastery of watercolors and pastels. In addition, his delicate line drawings indicate that Sarachi was also greatly influenced by Oriental art.

Sarachi's first personal exhibition was held in the aftermath of the Second World War (1945) at the Redfern Gallery, in London. In the folder advertising this exhibition there was written the phrase: "The miracles can still happen in the slaughterhouse of agony, crime and corruption that best describes our world. This is the message that the paintings of Chatin Sarachi express."which we think to be very suitable to his work and personality".

Kokoschka, Oskar. "Chatin Sarachi" - London, 1959

On the Catalogue of the exhibition, among other things, Kokoschka states:

"A contemporary painter with whom the larger public has not yet become acquainted does well to make his own decision of what he thinks the message, contained in his work, will be to those who are to greet him as the morning star.
"In the oils and drawings exhibited by Chatin Sarachi here is the work of a former diplomat whom one mighty moment has blessed. Who, at a sudden, was reminded of the time when, as a child, he trod the rude shore and the bare ground of his native Albania."

This first exhibition was followed by other two, in the mid fifties. A fourth, commemorating one, with fifty of his best paintings was opened in 1975. It included drawings, oil and water paintings, of landscapes, still lives, and several portraits. In the opening of this exhibition J.P. Hodin concludes with saying that Chatin Sarachi " …was a very good friend, an elaborate artist and one of the most colourful personalities ever known. He liked the high life but, at the same time, was so introspective. He had great artistic ambitions but little interest in criticism". Over the years, Sarachi participated in several group shows and had regular one man exhibitions in London, Paris and Dublin.

The last exhibition of his work was held at the Pride Gallery in London in 1988. Today, the work of Chatin is considered to be closely connected to Expressionism although his knowledge and appreciation included influences of Japanese and Chinese painters. This influence can be noticed quite clearly in some of his masterpieces, as are the flower paintings.

== Sarachi as a politician ==
Already, at an early age, Sarachi was known to be a very close friend of the King. In communicating to him (Zog), Chatin referred to himself as "[Your] ex best friend." It is this friendship that characterized the political arena of that time, to transform this Zog-Sarachi co-operation into a symbiotic relation and even to imply an unproved involvement of the name of Chatin Sarachi in Luigj Gurakuqi's murderer.

Sarachi, among his many writings, left a statement about the King Ahmet Zog the First, published in Albania in the year 2006. The typewriting entitled: ”The story of a bad man”, was left in the safe of a bank in London, from where it has been taken and translated into Albanian.

In his writings, Sarachi, among other things, speaking to King Zog, states:

"Your callings about our old friendship show that your conscience and its nibbles are at work.

Independently from your legal business, you began your reign by killing patriots and by selling your own country.

Alessandro Lessona (Minister of Mussolini's government), a friend of mine at the time, paid to you more than 4 million English Pounds from 1925 to 1931. Even I had the right to act, I never asked for my part. That money, as anyone in Albania knows, has been washed by the blood of patriots like Bajram Curri, Hasan Prishtina, Luigj Gurakuqi and thousands of them. The money you are living with today, is the product of the lowest betrayal and is washed by the tears and the suffering of a whole nation, the nation you sold, you Albanian Judas!

I know each dark corner of your soul, not a single event of your reign that I ignore.

From your cottage in the mountains, where you were born, you came to live in luxurious castles around Europe. But the nibbling of your conscience that twice brought you so close to the grave, still lives with you in the luxurious rooms.

Your gunned gangsters can protect your body but, for sure, they cannot protect you dark and poor soul. The friends and enemies you have ordered to kill still flatter around you night and day wherever you try to go. The shadows of more than 1 million chained Albanians run after you, calling your name. Thousand of Albanians dead, for the freedom of their country, cannot leave you alone."
