= Luigj Bumçi =

Albanian Roman Catholic priest

- Bishop of Lezhë
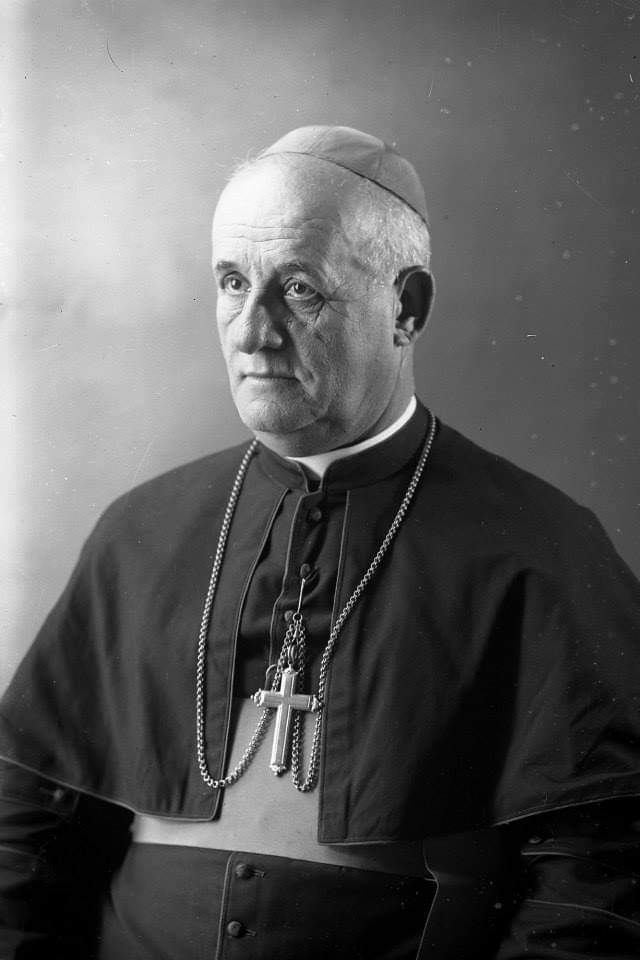
- Bumçi in 1936
- Church: Catholic Church
- Diocese: Diocese of Lezhë
- In office: 18 September 1911 – 1 September 1943
- Predecessor: Leonard Stefan Deda
- Successor: Frano Gjini
- Other post: Titular Bishop of Cantanus (1943-1945)

Orders
- Ordination: 30 May 1903
- Consecration: 10 December 1911 by Jak Serreqi

Personal details
- Born: 7 November 1872 Scutari, Scutari vilayet, Ottoman Empire
- Died: 1 March 1945 (aged 72)

Luigj Bumçi (7 November 1872 – 1 March 1945) was an Albanian Catholic religious and political figure.

== Life ==
Dom Luigj Bumçi was born in Shkodër, back then in the Scutari Vilayet of the Ottoman Empire, on 7 November 1872 in an Albanian Catholic family. He was the nephew of writer and Rilindas Pashko Vasa.

Bumçi trained for the priesthood in his native town and, in January 1912, was made bishop of Lezhë. In 1918, he participated in the Congress of Durrës and was elected Minister without Portfolio in the government of Turhan Pasha that came out of the congress. In 1919, he was sent by the government to preside over the Albanian delegation to the Paris Peace Conference. He intermediated through the Pope Benedict XV for opposing the Venizelos–Tittoni agreement for partitioning of Albania between Italy and Greece. He also participated in the Congress of Lushnje in January 1920 and, as a representative of the Catholic community, was elected to the four-member High Regency Council (Albanian: Këshilli i Lartë i Regjencës). Together with Aqif Pasha Biçaku he took part in a coup d’état in December 1921 and was later relieved of his duties on the High Council by Ahmet Zogu.

Thereafter, with some advice from Vatican, Bumçi withdrew from politics and returned to his ecclesiastical duties. He kept close relationship with Gjergj Fishta and Luigj Gurakuqi. He lobbied a lot for enabling Gurakuqi to enter the Assembly of Albania.

He was arrested by the communist authorities right after World War II. Tired of age and interrogations he died on 1 March 1945.

== See also ==
- Nikoll Kaçorri
