= Congress of Lushnjë =

1920 conference of Albanian political leaders

The Congress of Lushnja
- Official seal

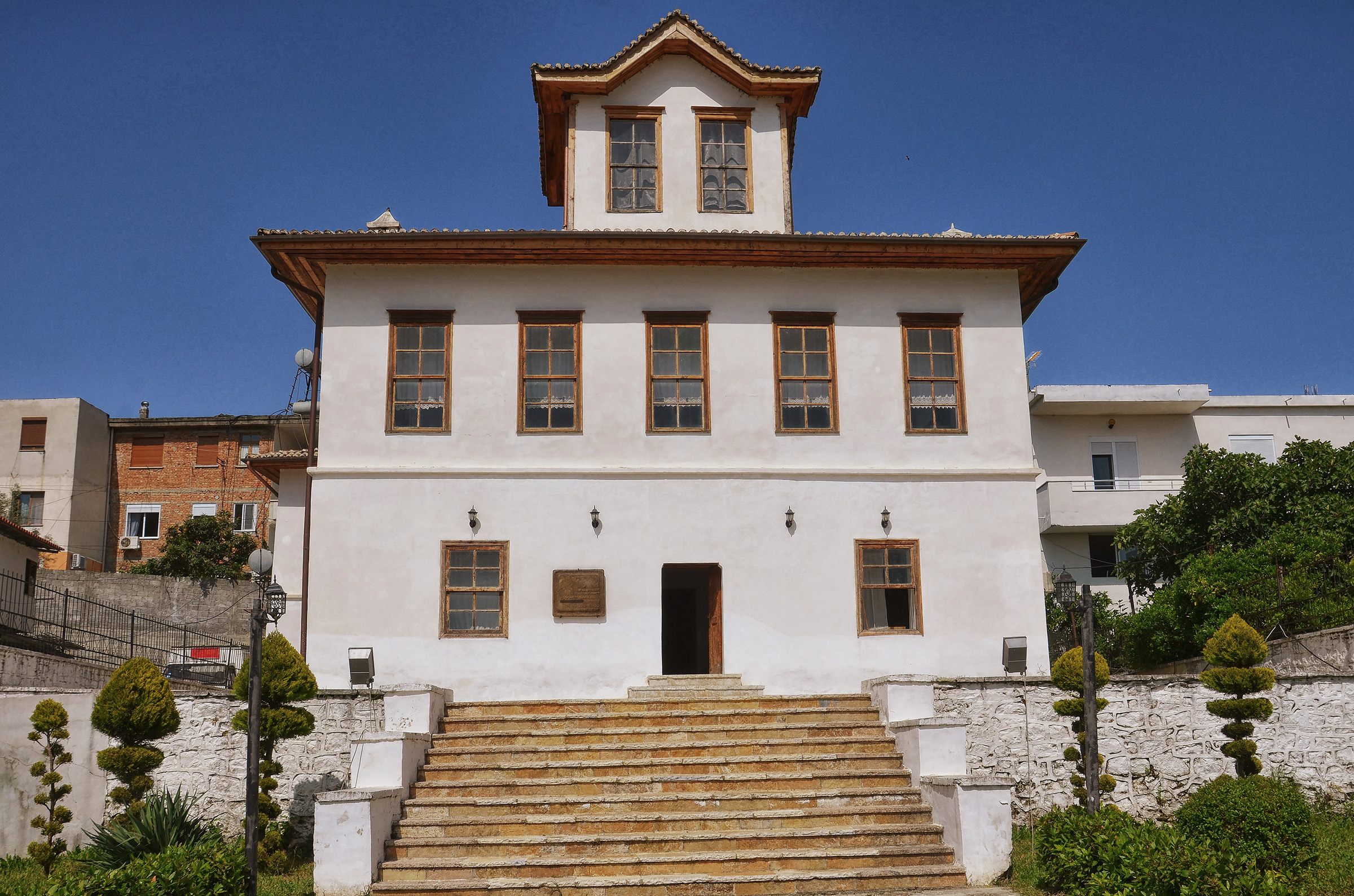
- The house where the congress was held now serves as a museum.
- Native name: Kongresi i Lushnjes
- Date: January 28–31, 1920
- Venue: Residence of Kaso Fuga
- Location: Lushnjë, Albania
- Also known as: Mbledhja Kombiare Lushje
- Outcome: The congress unanimously decided to overthrow the Government of Durrës and established a new constitution titled the Canonical Basis of the High Council.

The Congress of Lushnjë (Albanian: Kongresi i Lushnjës), historically documented by the name Mbledhja Kombiare e Lushnjes (The National Assembly of Lushnja), was a conference of Albanian political leaders held from January 21st to January 31st of 1920, in Lushnje, Albania.

Its objective was to deal with the issues arising from the military control of the country by mainly Italian and secondarily French troops and its political leadership by the pro-Italian Durrës-based government. Held at the residence of Kaso Fuga, it was attended by 56 delegates from Albania, adjacent Albanian-inhabited territories and representatives of Albanian emigrant colonies.

Illustration of the flag used at the event

Aqif Elbasani was elected president of the congress and Ferid Vokopola secretary. The congress declared the Durrës government invalid and formed a new cabinet under Sulejman Delvina. The new government consisted of the High Council (Albanian: Këshilli i Lartë) and the National Council (Albanian: Këshilli Kombëtar). The last decision of the congress was the designation of Tirana as the new capital of Albania. The congress' decisions would eventually lead a few months later to the Vlora War and as a result to the total withdrawal of the Italian army from Albania and the final affirmation of the country's territorial integrity in 1921. The building where the congress was held became a museum in 1970.

== History ==
=== Background ===
Partition of Albania according to the secret Treaty of London held on 16 April 1915

After the end of the First World War in Albania, a new political and organizational process began for the re-establishment of the country's institutions. Political ideas were concluded with the organization of the Congress of Durrës on 25 December 1918 and the creation of the Provisional Government of Turhan Pashë Përmeti. The so-called Government of Durrës failed to extend its authority all over the territory set by 1913 Treaty of London, as General Piacentini's Italian forces were still present in Albania. However, the Congress, anxious to keep Albania intact, expressed willingness to accept Italian protection and even an Italian prince as a ruler so long as it would mean Albania did not lose territory. In the Paris Peace Conference, Albania's representative delegation removed Prime Minister Përmeti as chairman of the delegation, because he openly presented the idea of placing Albania under the mandate of Italy, and appointed Luigj Bumçi as chairman.

On 19 July 1919, the secret agreement, later known as Venizelos–Tittoni agreement was signed by then Greek Prime Minister Eleftherios Venizelos and Italian Minister of Foreign Affairs Tommaso Tittoni, with bargains and mutual concessions for the territories of Albania. The Albanian delegation reacted to the agreement on 14 August 1919 at the Paris Peace Conference. At that conference, the agreement was merged with the secret Treaty of London of April 1915. A note of protest was also addressed to the President of the Peace Conference, Georges Clémenceau.

On 20 August 1919, an Italian-Albanian agreement was signed by Ministers Myfid Bej Libohova and Fejzi Bey Alizoti, and Marquis Carlo Durazzo, who was the Adviser of the Italian Legation in Albania. Italy accepted the extension of the authority of the administration of the Government of Durrës to all the territories occupied by Italy, with the exception of Sazan Island and that of Vlora, recognizing the latter sovereignty over those areas. The act also accepted the appointment as High Commissioner in Albania of Captain Fortunato Castoldi, to oversee the Albanian administration and institutions in "the most sensitive issues".

This was not well received by many prominent figures of the country, being considered as a truncation of the independence of the Albanian state. Influential people in Vlora such as Osman Haxhiu, Aristidh Ruҫi and Beqir Sulo Agalliu asked the government to allow the election of the members of the Senate, a request which was repeated on 15 October 1919 by members of the government itself. This never happened, pushing up revolts in almost the entire country.

The political situation escalated further on 14 January 1920, when the Prime Minister of United Kingdom David Lloyd George, that of France Georges Clémenceau and Francesco Nitti of Italy, in the absence of the U.S. representative, Frank L. Polk at the Peace Conference in Paris, signed an agreement that provided for the partition of Albania between its three neighboring countries, Greece in the south, Montenegro in the northwest and Serbia in the northeast.

=== Preparations ===
At the Paris Peace Conference, aside from the diaspora organizations, the Albanian side was represented by Foreign Minister Mehmed Konica, Mihal Turtulli, Luigj Gurakuqi, Luigj Bumçi, Gjergj Fishta, Mustafa Kruja (Note: Mustafa Kruja was born as Mustafa Asim Merlika in the city of Krujë. In Albania before the twentieth century but which continued until after the Second World War, many people, but especially those with influence bore as a surname the name of the city, village or area where they came from. Various authors often refer to him as Mustafa Merilika-Kruja) and Mid'hat Frashëri. But the latter was refused a passport by the Italian Government as the Albanian state at that time did not issue its own passports. The Italians behind the scenes supported Turhan Pasha Përmeti as head of the delegation, knowing that the latter would better protect Italian interests in the conference. This delegation was composed of representatives of different communities, both religious and cultural, but most of them were beys, rich people who did not enjoy the support of the general population, especially the nationalists. As if that was not enough to make things worse than they were, due to the divergences of what should be proposed at the conference, the division of the delegation into two groups began. Konica and Turtulli, who also had the support of the Albanian diaspora, especially those of the Americans such as the Vatra organization, proposed that it be formally requested before the conference that Albania pass to the U.S. mandate while the other faction argued why this did not it had to happen.

Later, Mustafa Kruja decided that there was a need to return to Albania due to some revolts undertaken by nationalists or various local groups and words that due to dissatisfaction with the provisional government a second congress could be organized and the government could be overthrown. Mehdi Frashëri and Mufid Libohova took his place to help the delegation. As soon as he returns to Durrës, he learns that some nationalists and influential figures in different regions of the country have created an alleged secret organization called Krahu Kombëtar (the National Wing or National Faction abbr. KK) also known as the Klika (the Clique) by its political opponents, with the aim of expelling Italian forces from the territory of Albania. This organization according to the later written memoirs of Mustafa Kruja and others was led by Eshref Frashëri. The two manage to meet and discuss the situation in the country and the solution. Eshref Frashëri's proposal to Kruja to deal with the situation was that the government should definitely be changed through a second congress and people free from Italian influence. While Kruja required time for this to happen because the government could not resign when the fate of Albania is in the hands of the Paris Conference and when a revolt had started in central Albania by Essad Pasha Toptani who was considered dangerous by both government and the nationalists of the KK. In a second meeting with Rexhep Mitrovica, also a member of the KK, it was agreed and a secret protocol was signed that Mustafa Kruja himself would first deal with the suppression of the revolts and then it was planned to hold a congress that according to the proposal would be held in the city of Krujë and to be proposed as prime minister Reshid Akif Pasha, former Minister of Interior of the Ottoman Empire.

While Mustafa Kruja had just managed to regain control of his city which was occupied by the forces of Essad Pasha, according to him a letter from Ahmet Zogu informed him that a new congress would be held in Lushnja and that Zogu himself would take part as Mat District representative. According to Sejfi Vllamasi, at the end of November 1919, a group of the Krahu Kombëtar discussed at the house of Prefect Abdyl Ypi in Durrës, the acceleration of the organization of the congress. Participants in that meeting were Sotir Peçi, Esheref Frashëri, Fazlli Frashëri, Sali Vuҫiterni, Halim Jakova-Gostivari, Xhevit Leskoviku and Sejfi Vllamasi. It was decided that Fazlli Frashëri would organize the delegates in Korçë District, Sejfi Vllamasi in Shkodër District and Zogu in Mat. Other organizing figures were Aqif Pasha Elbasani, Abdi Toptani, Ismail Ndroqi, Osman Myderrizi, Ferid Vokopola and Mytesim Këlliҫi. While to convince Ilias Vrioni that Berat District should also send delegates, was sent to the Commander of the Albanian Gendarmerie Meleq Frashëri. Vrioni confirmed that he and others would join the movement. Supporters for the organization of the congress were also the ministers of the government of Durrës, at the Peace Conference in Paris, Mehmet Konica, Mihal Turtulli and Monsignor Luigj Bumçi, whom were also met in Paris by the British Consul Morton Eden. In fact, the latter was very active at the time and often seen with members of the Krahu Kombëtar but it never became clear whether the British government supported the congress or not. Such a fact is acknowledged by Eqerem Bey Vlora, who was against the congress. According to him, Morton Eden spoke openly with the Albanian nationalists about the possibility of expelling the Italians and holding a congress. Eqerem Bey Vlora, had received Morton Eden in his house and discussed political developments with him, but, as he says in his memoirs, he did not engage in politics, as he did not believe that Albanians could organize the congress without Italy's approval and when numerous Italian forces commanded by his friend General Piacentini controlled almost all of Albania.

=== Efforts to prevent the convening ===
The government of Durrës did its best to prevent the holding of the Congress of Lushnjë, and there is no way it could be otherwise given that the latter aimed precisely at its dismissal from power. The movements started early with attempts to sabotage it. At a time when delegates were gathering in Lushnjë, on 15 January 1920 the Prefect of Durrës who was also a supporter and organizer of the Congress, Abdyl Ypi, was invited to the city school to discuss the situation. The moment he gets there, Sul Merlika, assisted by Salih Gjuka, shoots at him, leaving him dead. Sul Merlika was the first cousin of Mustafa Kruja while Gjuka was a close associate of his. The murder was made to look like the elimination of an Essadist, who especially in the city of Durrës did not enjoy any respect. According to the later memories of Sejfi Vllamasi, the assassination was known to have been committed due to the support that Ypi had for the Congress of Lushnjë, so much so that in a telegram sent to the Prefect of Shkodra, the then Minister of Finance Fejzi Alizoti, ordered not to allow delegates of northern Albania to go in Lushnje while at the end of the telegram he added that Abdyl Ypi had been killed. However, the assassination did not deter the congress at all, so much so that a large part of those who attended went directly from the funeral of Ypi held in the city of Durres.

The District of Kruja, the birthplace of Mustafa and where he had the most influence, also elects its delegates for the congress, one of whom was the mayor of the city Hysni Berber. Upon learning this news, Mustafa Kruja leaves for the city and urges Berberi not to go, and while the latter stubbornly leaves the next day, Kruja cuts him off and stops him by force of arms. While the first delegates arrive in Lushnjë between 15–20 January, the protection of the congress and the representatives was taken over by the Congressional Defense Chief Llazar Bozo with the command of the Gendarmerie of Lushnjë, Divjakë, and Libofshë. To their troops were added the command of the Gendarmerie of Dumrea led by Lieutenant Preng Jaku but also other volunteers from the surrounding areas.

The Minister of Justice Myfit Libohova went to Vlorë and tried to persuade General Piacentini to take military measures against the Congress of Lushnjë based on the secret agreement which the Government of Durrës had with the Italian General Command in Albania. Piacentini could not risk his actions to appear as interference in the internal affairs of Albania knowing that the situation and dissatisfaction with the Italian presence in the country was at its peak. Thus, without informing the command on anything, he ordered the Gjirokastër militia with about 1200 personnel, mostly Catholics from Shkodër, to leave for Lushnjë. The troops were stationed in Kolonjë with orders to disperse a gathering. But as soon as they arrived, the command of the militia dubious of the Italian orders established contact with Meleq Frashëri. The latter informed about the purposes and assures them that Congress is meeting for the future of Albania. The militia assured that it would not interfere in the activity of the congress but suggested speeding up the decision-making with the fear that the Italians would send more forces. The British consul Morton Eden, present in Lushnja, was anxious until the intention of the Albanian militia against the Congress was understood. As proved later, the militia stayed until the end of the Congress.

== Participants ==
Members of the initiatory commission are listed below:

1. Besim Nuri
2. Ferid Vokopola
3. Ibrahim Karbunara
4. Taullah Sinani
5. Emin Vokopola
6. Llazar Bozo
7. Nebi Sefa
8. Qemal Mullai
9. Zija Mullai
10. Mustafa Vokopola
11. Eshref Frasheri
12. Jonuz Sefa
13. Bajram Haxhiu
14. Skënder Pojani
15. Kadri Jenisheri
16. Teki Libohova
17. Filip Papajani
18. Abedin Nepravishta
19. Jakov Bozo
20. Andrea Papaj
21. Qerim Arapi
22. Rasim Hoxha
23. Arif Kurti
24. Muntar Luarasi
25. Reshat Shazivari
26. Abdyl Aziz
27. Hasan Islami Like
28. Hamit Xheka
29. Ahmet Zogu

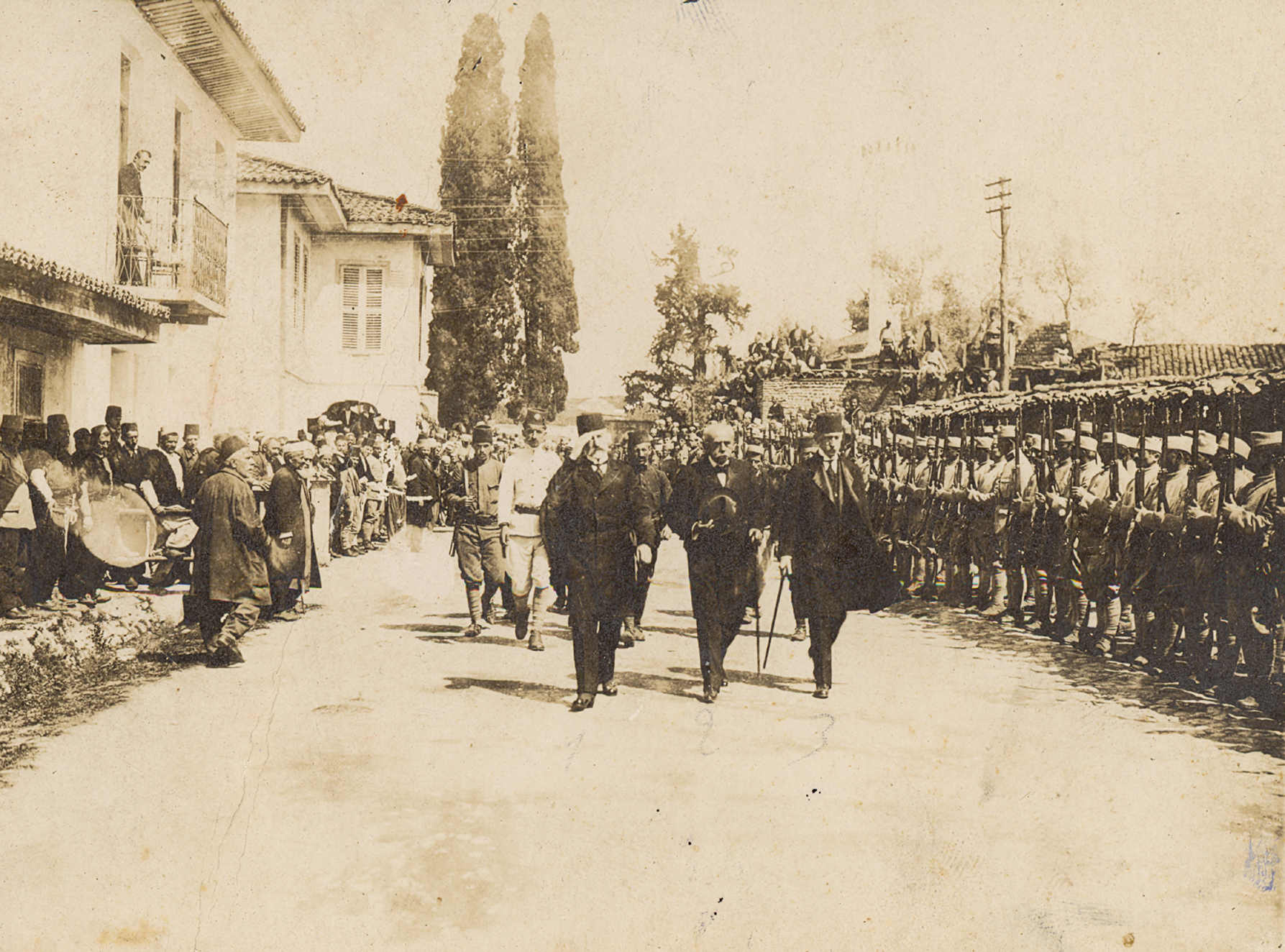
Members of the High Council entering the Regency Building: Aqif Pasha Elbasani, Mihal Turtulli, Abdi Toptani

== Decisions ==
The Congress was also concerned with the Government of Durrës that had the backing of the invading Italian army. It was alleged that Abdyl Ypi, the initiator of the Congress, had been assassinated by members of the Government of Durrës, who wanted to scare off the other delegates to the Congress. During its first session, the Congress decided unanimously on the otherthrow of the Government of Durrës and the organization of armed resistance against the Italian forces that were in control of part of southern Albania. The High Council was made up of Luigj Bumçi, Aqif Pashë Elbasani, Abdi Toptani, and Mihal Turtulli who would perform the function of the leaders of the new Albanian state, whereas the National Council would function as the Parliament. The congress's decisions would eventually lead a few months later to the Vlora War and as a result to the total withdrawal of the Italian army from Albania.

== Members of the National Council (Senate), 1920 ==
The National Council (Albanian: Këshilli Kombëtar), also referred to as the Senate (Senati), was the first Albanian legislative body. It was elected by the delegates of the Congress of Lushnjë and sat from 27 March 1920 to 20 December 1920. The following 41 members served during this period:

No.	Member	Notes
1	Abdurahman Krosi (Mati)	Also known as "Abdurahim Mati" and "Abdurahman Salih".
2	Adem Gjinishi	
3	Adem Peqini	
4	Ahmet Resuli	
5	Bajram Curri	
6	Bektash Cakrani	
7	Beqir bej Rusi	
8	Dine Dibra	Also known as "Dine Maqellara".
9	Dine Dema	
10	Dhimitër Kacimbra	
11	Fazlli Frashëri	Elected deputy for Korçë on 30 March 1920 in place of Qani Dishnica; sworn in on 19 April 1920.
12	Gjergj Koleci	
13	Hafiz Sabri bej	
14	Halim Çela	Sworn in on 4 May 1920.
15	Hilë Mosi	
16	Hysen Vrioni	Sworn in on 1 April 1920.
17	Irfan Ohri	
18	Kiço Koçi	
19	Kolë Thaçi	Sworn in at the 46th session of the National Council, 25 September 1920.
20	Kostaq Kotta	
21	Llambi Goxhomani	
22	Myqerem Hamzaraj	
23	Mytesim Këlliçi	
24	Neki Ruli	
25	Osman Lita	Sworn in at the 37th session of the National Council, 18 May 1920.
26	Qani Dishnica	Resigned for health reasons.
27	Qazim Durmishi	Sworn in on 23 September 1920.
28	Qazim Koculi	
29	Ramiz Daci	
30	Rexhep Mitrovica	
31	Sadullah Tepelena	
32	Sejfi Vllamasi	
33	Spiro Jorgo Koleka	
34	Spiro (Pilo) Papa	
35	Shefqet Vërlaci	
36	Thimi Çikozi	
37	Veli Kruja	
38	Visarion Xhuvani	
39	Xhemal Naipi	
40	Xhemal Shkodra (Bushati)	
41	Ymer Shijaku	

== Legacy ==
The Congress of Lushnje was the most important meeting of Albanian political leaders after the Declaration of Independence on November 28, 1912. It was essential for the territorial integrity of newly formed state of Albania. The other powers, mainly Italian troops were a real danger. The decisions made in the Congress had a huge impact on the future of the state. Tirana became the new capital of Albania and the first modern government under Prime Minister Suleyman Delvina was established. The Congress proved that Albanians were able to join forces and organise together in times of risk, like it happened in the past with League of Lezhe, League of Prizren and the Declaration of Independence. Several attempts to declare it a National Day (January 21) has been made by historians and civil society.

== See also ==
- Congress of Durrës
- Albanian Congress of Trieste
- Congress of Dibër
- League of Prizren
