= Mihal Turtulli =

Albanian diplomat

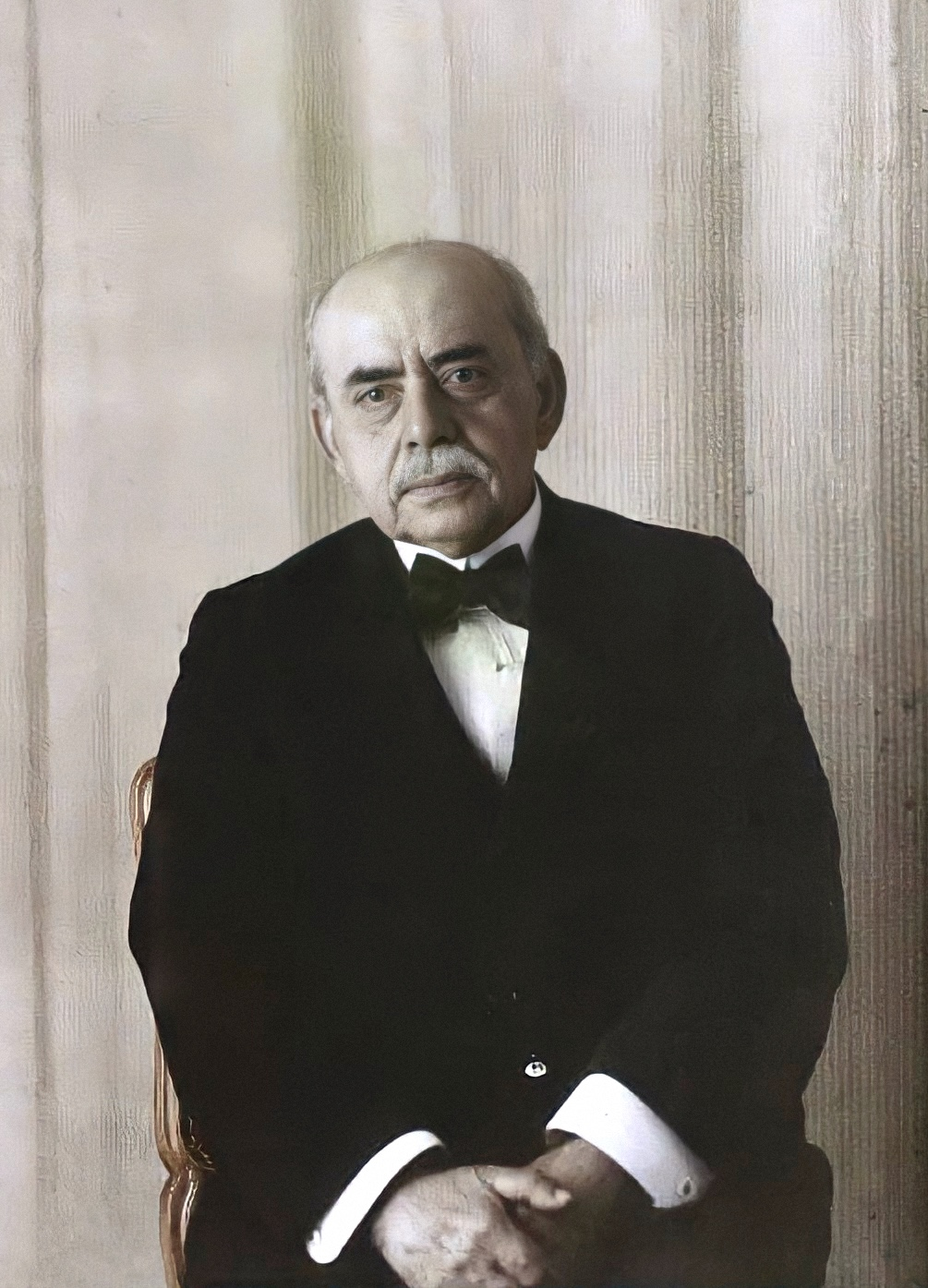
- Portrait of Mihal Turtulli
- Born: 1856; Korçë, Manastir Vilayet
- Died: 3 January 1935 (aged 78–79); Egypt
- Other names: Michal Tourtoulis; Dr.Turtulli
- Occupations: Oculist, politician
- Known for: Albanian delegation at the Peace Conference; Congress of Durres; Congress of Lushnje

Mihal Turtulli Bey (1856–3 January 1935), also known as Michail Tourtoulis or Dr. Turtulli, was an Albanian oculist, politician, member of the High Council of State (Jan - Dec 1920), and representative of Albania at the Paris Peace Conference of 1919.

== Biography ==
M. Turtulli was born in Korçë, Ottoman Empire. His family originated in Vithkuq and had settled in Korçë circa 1823. He was practically raised in El-Fayyūm, Egypt being part of the Albanian colony there. He graduated from the Lycée Al-Horreya of Alexandria. During the period 1876–1885, he studied medicine in Greece and later in France, where he became an oculist. He returned to Egypt in 1885 and worked as a physician in Cairo's hospitals until 1912. Following the Albanian Declaration of Independence from the Ottoman Empire in November 1912, he returned to Albania.
Turtulli was a supporter of Prince Wied for the Albanian throne. He was part of the delegation that went to Neuwied, Germany to offer the crown to Wied.
He was elected Minister of Health and Education in the provisional government of Turhan Pasha Përmeti on May 20, 1914. He spent most of the period until 1918 in Lausanne, Switzerland. During this time, he was active in the Albanian patriotic press where he advocated total unity between social and regional communities of Albania. While in Switzerland, together with Pandeli Cale and Sotir Kolea, he published the periodical L'Albanie, which went out during 1915–1919.
On June 3, 1917, with his initiative, Vatra, the Pan-Albanian Federation of America held a fundraising congress in order to support the diplomatic activities of Albania in the processes following World War I. Turtulli was the first to donate, with an amount of $1,000. In his telegram, he urged all members of Albanian-American diaspora to donate $10. This was the first fundraising event of Vatra, for this purpose.
In 1918, he was elected Representative of Vatra to establish contacts with the Albanian community of Italy and Italian authorities, in the eve of Congress of Durrës. Due to his non pro-Italian stance, he was substituted by Mehmed Konica. Turtulli participated in the Congress of Durres (Dec 25–27, 1918), and was elected Minister without portfolio in the government that came out of it.

In 1919, he represented Albania in the Paris Peace Conference. He strongly advocated the unity of Albanian nation against the stance of Alexandros Karapanos who represented the Greeks of Northern Epirus (South Albania) claiming that the region should be ceased to Greece and that was the will of the Orthodox population, by stating: "I am from Korça. I have worked as a doctor in that town. I say there are no Greeks in Korça, not even in Korça area. Greece stirs things up. They think that the Christians, like me, are Greek. This is not correct. It is pretended that all the Orthodox people are Greek. Why? Russians, Bulgarians, Serbs, even being Orthodox they are not Greek".

Turtulli was a delegate at the Congress of Lushnja of 1920, and was elected member of the High Council of State as representative of the Albanian Orthodox population, along with Luigj Bumçi for the Catholic, Aqif Pasha Elbasani for the Bektashi, and Abdi Bey Toptani for the Muslim. In April 1921, he stopped participating in the Council's activities, and retired completely in 1922, following the allegations that Bumçi and Aqif Pasha Elbasani were involved in a coup d'etat against Ahmet Zogu's government. He left Albania in December 1924 after the suppression of the June Revolution. Though he went back to Egypt, unlike most of the anti-Zogist personalities who fled the country, he affiliated himself with KONARE (The National Revolutionary Committee) founded by Fan Noli in Vienna. Meanwhile, Zogu's government had him on the black list, and he was sentenced in absentia to 101 years, but he was included in an amnesty of 1927.
Turtulli returned shortly to Albania, and thenwent back to Egypt where he spent the final years of his life.

== See also ==
- Gaqo Adhamidhi
