= Turhan Përmeti =

Albanian diplomat (1846–1927)

Turhan Pasha Përmeti
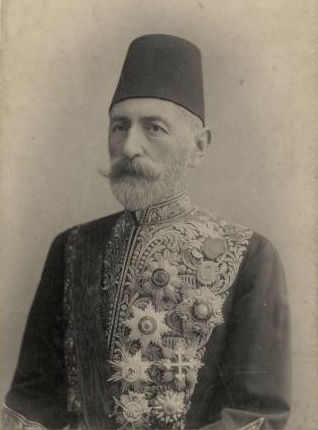

2nd Prime Minister of Albania
- In office 25 December 1918 – 29 January 1920
- Monarch: Wilhelm I
- Preceded by: Essad Toptani
- Succeeded by: Sulejman Delvina
- In office 14 March 1914 – 3 September 1914
- Monarch: Wilhelm I
- Preceded by: Ismail Qemali
- Succeeded by: Essad Toptani

Wali of Crete
- In office 12 March 1896 – May 1896
- Preceded by: Alexander Karatheodori Pasha
- Succeeded by: Kölemen Abdullah Pasha
- In office 1894–1895
- Preceded by: Mahmud Celaleddin Pasha
- Succeeded by: Alexander Karatheodori Pasha

Ministry of Foreign Affairs of the Ottoman Empire
- In office 1896–1899
- Monarch: Abdul Hamid II
- Grand Vizier: Halil Rifat Pasha
- Preceded by: Said Halim Pasha
- Succeeded by: Said Halim Pasha

Personal details
- Born: 19 December 1846; Trikala, Ottoman Empire (now Greece)
- Died: 18 February 1927 (aged 80); Neuilly, France

Turhan Pasha Përmeti (19 December 1846 – 18 February 1927) was an Albanian politician and statesman who served as the second prime minister of Albania, serving from March 1914 to September 1914 and from December 1918 to January 1920. He was also in service of the Ottoman state and held the title of Pasha of the Ottoman Empire.

Among the Ottoman posts he occupied were Governor of Crete 1895 and 1896, and ambassador in Saint Petersburg. He was a fluent Greek speaker and considered a capable though rather indecisive administrator. His governorship of Crete ended with the insurrection of May 24, 1896 that eventually led to the loss of the island by the Ottoman Empire. Përmeti represented the Ottoman Empire as its delegate at the Second Hague Peace Conference of 1907.

On 17 March 1914, he was appointed as Prime Minister and Minister of Foreign Affairs by Prince Wied, in the so-called Definitive Government. He became Albania's second prime minister succeeding Ismail Qemali. Përmeti remained foreign minister until May 28, 1914, then replaced by Prenk Bib Doda, who himself was succeeded by Mehmed Konica in July. Përmeti's contemporaries argued that, because he had lacked affiliation with the Albanian national cause, he was not familiar with the needs of Albanians. His premiership was interrupted by Albanian discontent twice. He was overthrown by Essad Toptani in 1914, and then by the Congress of Lushnjë in 1920.

== Political career ==
Përmeti served as the second prime minister of Albania from 14 March 1914 to 3 September 1914 and on a second term from 25 December 1918 to 29 January 1920.

The composition of government was proposed since the first session of the meetings. Përmeti's government of the Principality of Albania (25 December 1918 – 29 January 1920) included Prenk Bib Doda, Mufid Libohova, Luigj Bumçi, Mustafa Merlika-Kruja, Mihal Turtulli, Mehmed Konica, Sami Vrioni, Mid'hat Frashëri, Luigj Gurakuqi, Lef Nosi, Fejzi Alizoti and also Petro Poga.

== See also ==
- List of prime ministers of Albania

== Sources ==
- Fjalor enciklopedik shqiptar: N-Zh dhe një shtojcë (in Albanian). Academy of Sciences of Albania. 2009. ISBN 978-9-9956-1032-6. Archived from the original on 21 October 2023.
- Chekrezi, Constantin Anastas, ed. (February 1919). "The Provisional Albanian Government - Hail, Free Albania!". The Adriatic Review. 1 (5–6). Boston, Massachusetts: Vatra.
- Elsie, Robert (2010). Historical Dictionary of Albania. Scarecrow Press. ISBN 9780810861886.
- Özdalga, Elisabeth (2011). Late Ottoman Society: The Intellectual Legacy. Soas/Routledge Curzon Studies on the Middle East. Routledge. ISBN 978-0-415-66544-5.
- Pearson, Owen (2006). Albania in the Twentieth Century, A History: Volume I: Albania and King Zog, 1908–39. I. B. Tauris. ISBN 978-1-84511-013-0.

Government offices
Preceded by Fejzi Alizoti	Prime Minister of Albania; 1914	Succeeded by Essad Toptani
Preceded by Essad Toptani	Prime Minister of Albania; 1918 – 1920	Succeeded by Sulejman Delvina
