= Abdyl Ypi =

Albanian politician

Abdyl bey Ypi
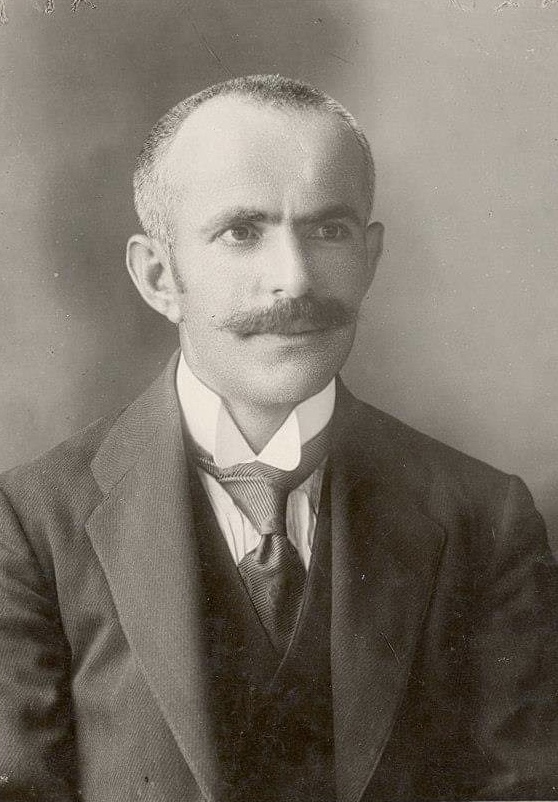
- Born: 1876; Kolonjë, Vilayet of Janina, Ottoman Empire
- Died: 15 January 1920 (aged 43–44)
- Cause of death: Assassinated
- Occupation: Politician
- Known for: Congress of Lushnjë

Abdyl bey Ypi (1876–1920) was an Albanian politician and one of the main initiators of the Congress of Lushnjë.

== Life ==
Abdyl Ypi was born in Kolonjë, then part of the Vilayet of Janina, in present-day Albania. He was a political figure of the National Movement active during the first two decades of the 20th century. A well-known turkophile, he participated in the Young Turks movement and subsequently in July 1908 became chairman of the Albanian Club of Istanbul. After World War I, Ypi opposed the pro-capitalist political orientation of the Durrës Government formed in December 1918, propagating the overthrow of this government and the organization of the Congress of Lushnjë. He held various official posts such as that of the Sub-prefect of Korçë, the Prefect of Durrës, the Governor of Konica and Kolonjë. Ypi was killed in the city of Durrës on January 15, 1920.
