= Mustafa Merlika-Kruja =

Albanian politician (1887-1958)

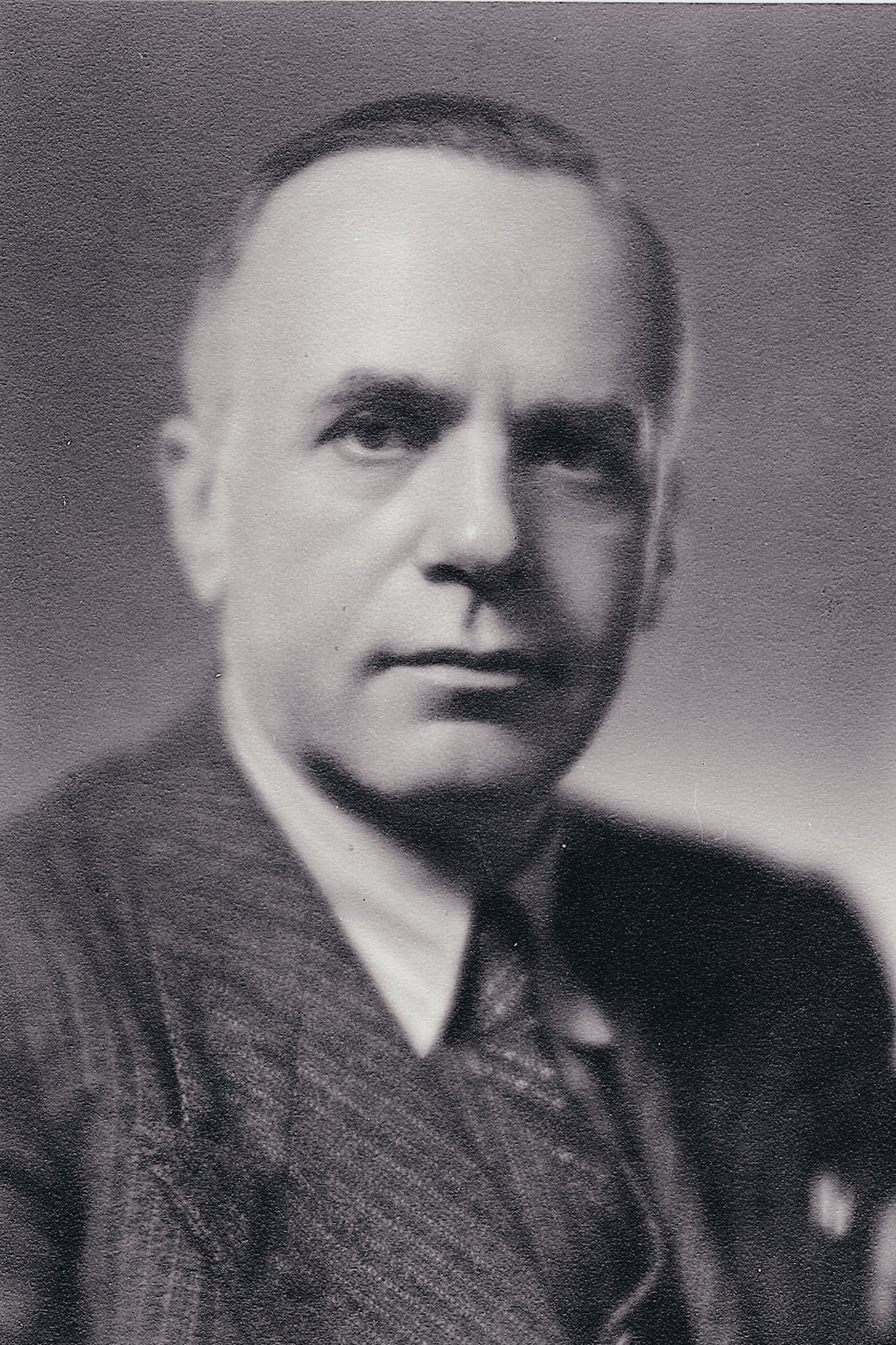

16th Prime Minister of Albania
- In office December 4, 1941 – January 19, 1943
- Monarch: Victor Emmanuel III
- Preceded by: Shefqet Vërlaci
- Succeeded by: Ekrem Libohova

Senator of the Senate of the Kingdom of Italy
- In office Aprile 08, 1939 – August 25, 1944
- Monarch: Victor Emmanuel III

Personal details
- Born: March 15, 1887 Akçahisar, Scutari Vilayet, Ottoman Empire (modern-day Krujë, Albania)
- Died: December 27, 1958 (aged 71) Niagara Falls, New York, U.S.
- Party: Albanian Fascist Party
- Parent: Mehmed Merlika (Father)
- Profession: Prime Minister

Mustafa Merlika-Kruja (March 15, 1887 – December 27, 1958) was one of the signatories of the Albanian Declaration of Independence. He was Prime Minister of Albania during the Italian occupation from December 4, 1941, to January 19, 1943 and Senator of Italian Kingdom.

== Early life ==
He was born Mustafa Asim Merlika, son of Mehmed. His family was Bektashi. His father was a local administrator of the lands of Essad Pasha, who from his side sponsored the education of Mustafa. According to Albanian sources he studied at the local rüştiye(high school), then in Yannina, before going to what is today's Faculty of Political Science, Ankara University ("Mekteb-i Mülkiye"), then located in Istanbul, which he finished in 1910. According to Turkish author Çankaya, he studied at the local school in Elbasan, then in Mercan idadisi in Istanbul before entering the Mülkiye. There he learned Turkish and French.

== Ottoman and Albanian politics (1910–1924) ==
As a student in the Ottoman capital he joined the Revolutionary League ("Cemiyet-i İnkılabiye") against the autocracy of Sultan Abdul Hamid II. After the Young Turk Revolution he worked for supporting the Albanian language at the Mülkiye, and posted articles in the liberal press against the Committee of Union and Progress using the signature "Asim Cenan". Contrary to what Essad Pasha had in mind for him, instead of becoming Kaymakam he preferred a career in education. In 1910 he was appointed secretary of the administration, in the Ministry of Public Education in Istanbul. A year later he was appointed director of Public Education for the Sanjak of Elbasan, Manastir Vilayet.

After participating as a volunteer in the Ottoman army during the Italo-Turkish War in 1912, he joined the Albanian Independence movement. Merlika-Kruja participated in the Assembly of Vlorë of 28 November 1912, and his name appears in the list of signatories of the Independence Act. In 1913 he joined the Ministry of Education and in 1914 became an adviser of the Ministry of Public Education.

In 1918 he participated in the Congress of Durrës, favored an Italian protectorate over Albania, and was elected Minister of Posts and Telegraphs. According to Sejfi Vllamasi's (1883–1975) memoirs, there Kruja had been the main opponent of the Congress of Lushnjë event together with Fejzi Alizoti, Myfit Libohova, and Sami Vrioni. These include the assassination of the Prefect of Durrës (and delegate to Lushnjë) Abdyl Ypi (1876-1920) by Sul Mërlika, himself cousin of Kruja, the prohibition of Krujë delegates to join the congress, the attempts to stop the delegates of Committee for the National Defence of Kosovo, as well as failed attempts of Fejzi Alizoti and Myfid Libohova to stop other delegates from north and south of the country even involving Italian militia.

In 1921 he was elected to the Albanian parliament where he belonged to a progressive trend, openly opposing Ahmet Zogu's clan, and close with connections to the Committee for the National Defence of Kosovo which would be officially banned by Zogu later. In 1922, he was involved in a coup d'état attempt against the government of Xhafer Ypi together with the north-east Dibra clan of Cen Elezi and Elez Isufi, and had to temporarily flee from Albania to Yugoslavia. He was placed in an internment camp there. Kruja asked permission to visit Vienna for personal reasons and was granted temporary pass-out. He did not return to Yugoslavia, breaking his agreement and placing himself in the "black list" of the Yugoslav authorities. In 1924 he was appointed prefect by Noli's government.

== Exile ==
As an active participant of the June Revolution in 1924, he had to flee the country and moved to Zadar, Vienna, and later settled in Switzerland. There he joined the KONARE ("Revolutionary National Committee") established by Noli. During these exile years, Kruja would be pro-Italian and prominent Zog opponent, keeping also ties with the "Bashkimi Kombëtar" ("National Union") organization and other exile personalities as Hasan Prishtina, Sejfi Vllamasi, Ali Këlcyra, Qazim Mulleti, Aziz Çami, Rexhep Mitrovica, etc.

== World War II ==
On August 4, 1939, after the personal union of Albania to the crown of Italy, Merlika-Kruja was appointed as a Senator within the Italian Kingdom until August 25, 1944, when he resigned. During his tenure he was a member of the Foreign Affairs, Trade and Customs legislature. He is remembered for the public speech held on December 24, 1942, in response of the Anthony Eden's statement in accordance with the communique of the Greek government in London (in exile) which stated that Britain and US would not recognize any border changes established by the Fascists, and that neighboring countries would have the right to claim parts of Albania at the end of the war.

Following the Axis occupation of Yugoslavia (in which Kosovo was occupied by Albania), the Albanian authorities under Mustafa Kruja forcibly expelled 70,000–100,000 Serbs, primarily colonists. Fascist Italy colonized Kosovo and Macedonia with 70,000 Albanians, who carried out religious persecution in the form of damaging and confiscating churches and monasteries, and exilement and murder of Orthodox priests. In June 1942, he held a public speech in which he said that Serbs would be sent to concentration camps or killed.

In the spring of 1944 he escaped by boat from Albania to Italy and from there to Egypt. There he met an old rival of his, the Albanian King Ahmed Zogu. After World War II he lived in France. During the last exile period he would join the political organization in exile created by Dr. Ismail Verlaci, Kapidan Gjon Markagjoni and Ndue Gjon Marku of which Albanian publicist and writer Ernest Koliqi (1903–1975) was a member. This organization was named the "Independent National Bloc" and was formed on 6 November 1946, in Rome. The last years of his life were spent in the United States where he died in a hospital in Niagara Falls, New York.

== Work ==
During his life, Kruja would write articles to many Albanian journals within and outside Albania, including Il Corriere delle Puglie (1914), Albanian newspaper of Rome Kuvendi ("The Assembly") (1918), and Mbrojtja Kombëtare ("The national defense") published in Vlora between 1920 and 1923. After World War I he worked on a voluminous dictionary of the Albanian language. He continued his intellectual studies until the end of his life, some of them published in periodicals and books, and some of them published posthumously by his descendant after the fall of communism in Albania.

Political offices
| Preceded by Shefqet Bej Vërlaci | Prime Minister of Albania; 1941-1943 | Succeeded by Eqrem Bej Libohova |
