= Luigj Gurakuqi =

Albanian writer and politician (1879–1925)

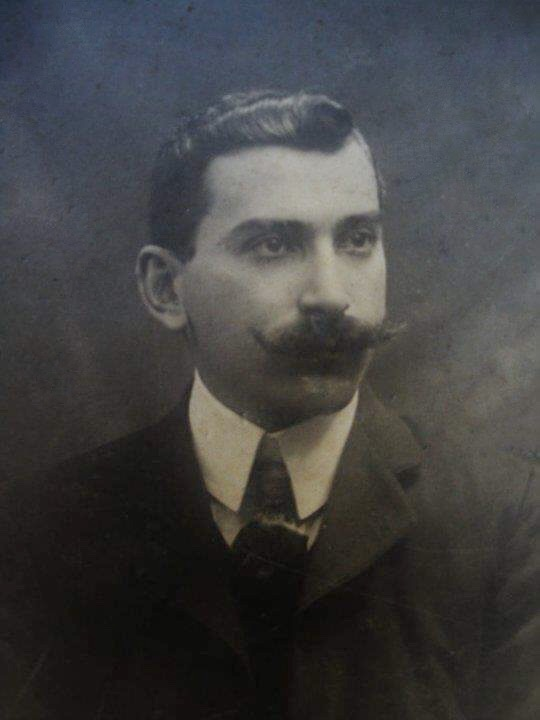
- Gurakuqi, 1910s
- Born: 19 February 1879; Shkodër, Scutari Vilayet, Ottoman Empire (now Albania)
- Died: 2 March 1925 (aged 46); Bari, Kingdom of Italy
- Occupations: Writer, journalist, politician
- Writing career
- Pen name: Jakin Shkodra, Lekë Gruda
- Period: 1900–1925
- Notable awards: Hero of the People
- Movement: Albanian National Revival

Luigj Gurakuqi (19 February 1879 – 2 March 1925), also called Louis Gurakuchi, was an Albanian writer and politician. He was an important figure of the Albanian National Awakening and was honored with the People's Hero of Albania medal.

== Biography ==
=== Early life ===
Gurakuqi was born to a Catholic family in Shkodër, a vilayet center of the Ottoman Empire at the time, on February 19, 1879. He studied at the Jesuit-run St. Xavier College He was also a poet and published under the pen name Jakin Shkodra and Lekë Gruda. He published articles in Albania, Drita, Kalendari-kombëtar, Liria e Shqipërisë, and La Nazione Albanese.

=== Albanian independence ===
By September 1912, Gurakuqi and Ismail Kemal traveled to Bucharest to consult with the large Albanian diaspora regarding Albanian geopolitical issues.

=== Principality of Albania and Noli's Government ===
In 1924 Gurakuqi was one of the leaders of the revolution that overthrew the regime of Ahmet Zogu and established a democratic government. Fan S. Noli became the new prime minister, while Luigj Gurakuqi was part of the new cabinet as Minister of Economy and Finance.

=== Exile and death ===
After the restoration of the Zogist regime, Gurakuqi lived in Bari, Italy, where he was murdered in a café by Balto Stambolla.

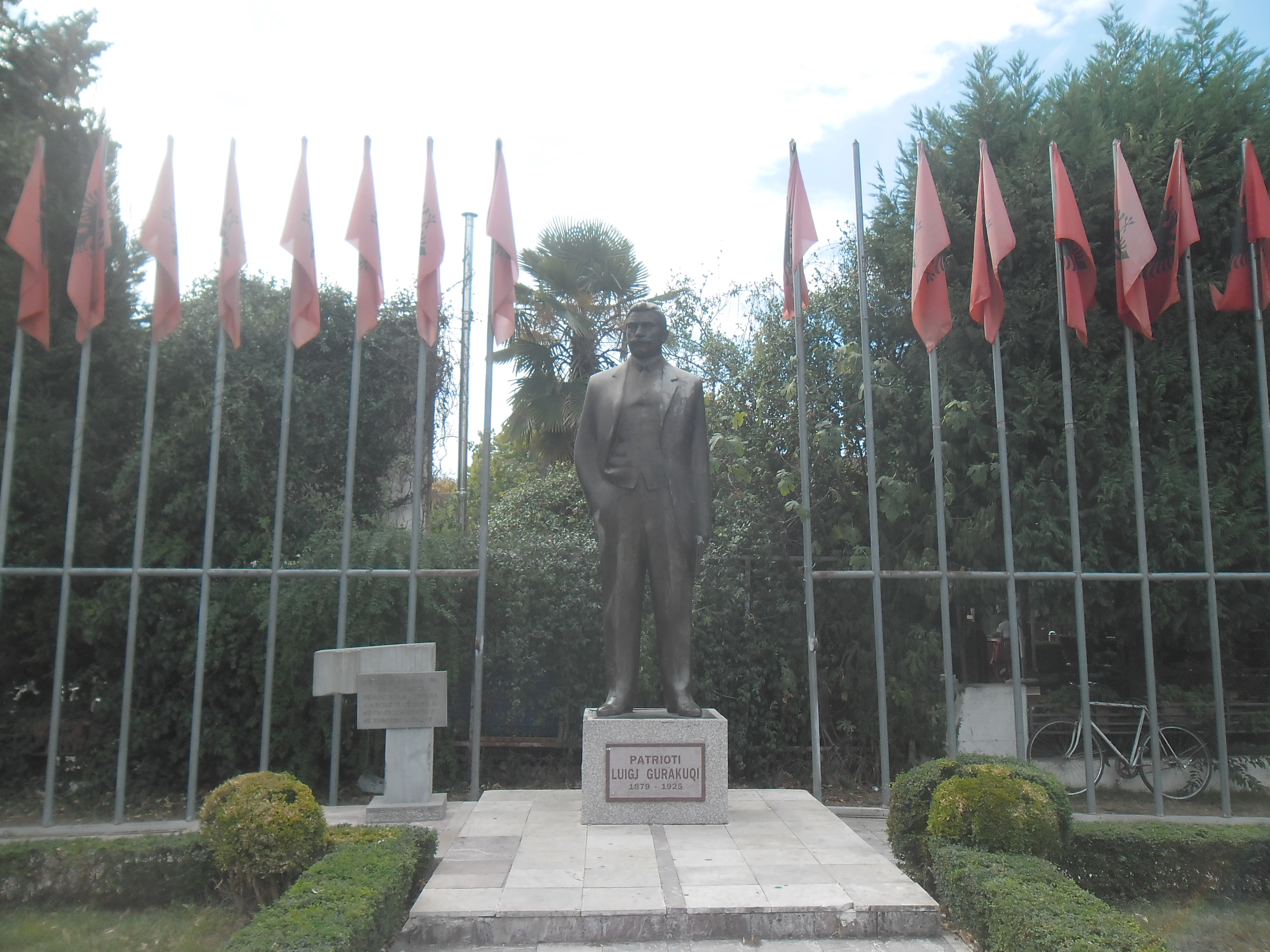
Monument in Shkodër

Balto Stambolla was extradited back to his homeland in 1942 during the Italian occupation of Albania, by a personal request from Mustafa Merlika-Kruja. He then ordered the prison guards of Fier to murder Stambolla. This was done in order to avenge Gurakuqi.

== Honors ==
Luigj Gurakuqi was awarded the titles Hero i Popullit (Hero of the People) and Mësues i Popullit (Teacher of the People). A statue of him stands in the center of Shkodër.

== See also ==
- Albanian National Awakening
- History of Albania
- Politics of Albania
