= Minister without portfolio (Albania) =

- Ministër pa portofol

Office overview
- Formed: 30 January 1920
- Dissolved: 1 March 1997
- Jurisdiction: Council of Ministers
- Headquarters: Tirana, Albania
- Website: kryeministria.al

The Minister without portfolio (Albanian: Ministër pa portofol) was a member of the Albanian government who performed important administrative tasks but was not in charge of leading a select ministerial office or held a specific title. The minister and other subservient offices of the government carried out their duties in accordance with the general policies defined by the council of ministers.

== History ==
The post of the minister without portfolio can be traced back to 1918 with the second government of Turhan Pasha Përmeti. Known as the Government of Durrës, the members of this cabinet were labeled as delegates without portfolio. The post was officially instituted with the start of the Delvina Government on 30 January 1920. The first ministers to hold the post were Bajram Curri, Hysen Vrioni and Spiro Jorgo Koleka.

== Officeholders (1920–present) ==
Only ministers who held the official title "Minister without portfolio" are ranked.

No.	Name	Term in office
*	Mid'hat Frashëri (Note: A delegate without portfolio was not officially appointed as minister but held the interim position of a minister. As such, they are listed with an asterix.)	25 December 1918	29 January 1920
*	Luigj Bumçi	25 December 1918	29 January 1920
*	Mihal Turtulli	25 December 1918	29 January 1920
Post was instituted on 30 January 1920
1	Bajram Curri (Note: The ranking is not chronological since several ministers served simultaneously in the position.)	30 January 1920	27 May 1920
2	Hysen Vrioni	30 January 1920	27 May 1920
3	Spiro Jorgo Koleka	30 January 1920	27 May 1920
4	Xhemal Bushati	16 June 1924	24 December 1924
Post was vacant from 1925 until 1946 (Note: Francesco Cancellario d'Alena, Nicola Russo Attoma and Mario Bianchi served as members of the Interim Administrative Committee.)
5	Tuk Jakova	22 March 1946	6 February 1948
6	Haxhi Lleshi	22 March 1946	4 July 1950
7	Nesti Kerenxhi	22 March 1946	21 November 1948
8	Pandi Kristo	22 March 1946	30 October 1948
9	Manush Myftiu	17 November 1949	4 July 1950
10	Panajot Plaku	29 October 1956	17 May 1957
11	Xhafer Spahiu	22 June 1958	16 July 1962
12	Shefqet Peçi	14 September 1966	18 November 1970
13	Sulejman Baholli	19 November 1970	28 October 1974
*	Muho Asllani (Note: Muho Asllani served as Minister near the Council of Ministers.)	25 December 1979	18 December 1981
*	Farudin Hoxha (Note: Farudin Hoxha served as Minister near the Council of Ministers.)	18 February 1988	21 February 1991
14	Rexhep Uka (Note: Rexhep Uka served as Minister without portfolio in charge of addressing issues of local governance.)	6 April 1993	3 December 1994
15	Hasan Halili	11 July 1996	1 March 1997
Official title has not been in use since 1997
*	Kastriot Islami (Note: Kastriot Islami served as State Minister.)	25 July 1997	23 April 1998
*	Preç Zogaj (Note: Preç Zogaj served as State Minister near the Prime Minister.)	28 October 1999	15 January 2000
*	Ilir Zela (Note: Ilir Zela served as State Minister near the Prime Minister.)	15 January 2000	8 July 2000
*	Ndre Legisi (Note: Ndre Legisi served as State Minister near the Prime Minister.)	8 July 2000	25 July 2002
*	Blendi Klosi (Note: Blendi Klosi served as State Minister.)	29 July 2002	29 December 2003
