= Government of Stability (Albania) =

Government of Stability Qeveria e Stabilitetit
- 52nd Government of Albania
- June–December 1991
- Date formed: 12 June 1991
- Date dissolved: 6 December 1991 (178 days)

People and organisations
- President: Ramiz Alia
- Prime Minister: Ylli Bufi
- Deputy Prime Minister: Gramoz Pashko; Zydi Pepa
- No. of ministers: 19
- Total no. of members: 25 (Note: Including the Prime Minister, the government consisted of 19 members, among whom Gramoz Pashko exercised 2 roles simultaneously. In addition, 6 other members were considered Secretaries of State)
- Member parties: PS, PD, PR, PSD, PA
- Status in legislature: Interim government

History
- Incoming formation: 5 June 1991 Agreement
- Outgoing election: 1991 election
- Legislature term: Constitutional Assembly
- Predecessor: Nano II Government
- Successor: Technical Government

The Bufi Government better known as the Government of Stability (Albanian: Qeveria e Stabilitetit) was an interim government formed after the resignation of the previous Nano government due to the aggravated situation in the country after the events of 2 April 1991 where 4 opposition supporters were killed in Shkodër during an anti-communist protest that led to the burning of the Shkodra Labor Party Committee. The Nano government resigned on 4 June 1991, and the next day the then-President Ramiz Alia, began negotiations to form a comprehensive government whose main objective would be to restore stability to the country, from which it took the name "Stability Government". Ylli Bufi was accepted also by the opposition to be appointed as Prime Minister, while one of the most prominent figures of the Democratic Party, such as Gramoz Pashko, was appointed Deputy Prime Minister.

== Background ==
The Labor Party had won the 31 March 1991 parliamentary elections, which were also supposed to bring about a change in the system of government from dictatorship to democracy. But it was the party that had ruled for 45 years that won over 2/3 of Parliament. However, the Democratic Party and its allies had won in the main cities of the country by providing greater support to the most educated people. During the two Nano governments in Albania, strikes began that culminated in a hunger strike by Valias miners in Tirana. The country was embroiled in unrest and then-President Ramiz Alia agreed to form a joint PPSH-PD government with a prime minister from the main political force, on the condition that a year later there would be early elections.

Meanwhile, the Labour Party organizes its congress on 12 June 1991 and announces the establishment of the Socialist Party. Fatos Nano was elected chairman of the party.

Berisha, dissatisfied with the work of the government, was afraid of the fact that the Democrats could lose the support of the people and be considered responsible for the difficult situation in the country. On 26 November 1991, the National Council of the Democratic Party submitted 4 demands as conditions for its stay in government:

- Arrest of the so-called Bllokmens (Note: Bllokmen is a slang term that refers to communist leadership and their family members. This term comes from the fact that they lived in an almost exclusive area of Tirana called "Blloku" where the heads of the communist regime lived separated from the ordinary people of the city. This area was guarded by the Police and Sigurimi and people had limited access during the years of dictatorship.) (including Nexhmije Hoxha)
- Dismissal of the general director of RTSH
- Finding the culprits for the April 2 murders in Shkodër
- Bring the election date closer

On 4 December, Berisha ousted Democratic ministers from the government and the Stability Government resigned. Neritan Ceka, at the time deputy chairman of the Democratic Party, left the party accusing Sali Berisha of using undemocratic means to overthrow the government. He called the removal of Democratic ministers from the government "a resignation from a historic responsibility."

== Cabinet ==
The government held office from 11 June 1991 until 6 December 1991 and there were no cabinet changes. Despite the fact that the negotiations started with the agreement between the Democratic Party and the Labor Party, the day after the formation of the government was held the Labor Party Congress, in which was decided the establishment of the Socialist Party and practically the dissolution of its predecessor. The members of the government proposed by the Labor Party were all included in the new party. Ylli Bufi's government had a total of 19 cabinet members and 4 secretaries of state, (Note: Secretaries of State had similar functions to Ministers without portfolios) while Gramoz Pashko simultaneously served as Deputy Prime Minister and Minister of Economy.

Portfolio	Minister	Took office	Left office	Party
Prime Minister	Ylli Bufi	12 June 1991	6 December 1991	PS
Deputy Prime Minister	Gramoz Pashko	12 June 1991	6 December 1991	PD
Deputy Prime Minister	Zyhdi Pepa	12 June 1991	6 December 1991	PS
Ministry of Finances	Genc Ruli	12 June 1991	6 December 1991	PD
Ministry of Public Order	Bajram Yzeri	12 June 1991	6 December 1991	PS
Ministry of Defence	Perikli Teta	12 June 1991	6 December 1991	PD
Ministry of Foreign Affairs	Muhamet Kapllani	12 June 1991	6 December 1991	PS
Ministry of Justice	Shefqet Muçi	12 June 1991	6 December 1991	PSD
Ministry of Economy	Gramoz Pashko	12 June 1991	6 December 1991	PD
Ministry of Education	Maqo Lakrori	12 June 1991	6 December 1991	PS
Ministry of Agriculture	Nexhmedin Dumani	12 June 1991	6 December 1991	PS
Ministry of Construction	Emin Musliu	12 June 1991	6 December 1991	PD
Ministry of Health	Sabit Brokaj	12 June 1991	6 December 1991	PS
Ministry of Culture, Youth and Sports	Preç Zogaj	12 June 1991	6 December 1991	PD
Ministry of Transport	Fatos Bitincka	12 June 1991	6 December 1991	PR
Ministry of Mining Resources and Energy	Drini Mezini	12 June 1991	6 December 1991	PS
Ministry of Industry	Jordan Misja	12 June 1991	6 December 1991	PD
Minister of Food	Vilson Ahmeti	12 June 1991	6 December 1991	PS
Ministry of Domestic Trade and Tourism	Agim Mero	12 June 1991	6 December 1991	PD
Minister of Foreign Economic Relations	Fatos Nano	12 June 1991	17 June 1991	PS
Minister of Foreign Economic Relations	Ylli Çabiri (Note: The post was originally given to Fatos Nano on the 11th but was replaced 6 days later by Çabiri)	17 June 1991	6 December 1991	PS

== See also ==
- Politics of Albania
- Council of Ministers of Albania

== Sources ==
- Bufi, Ylli (2016), Në fillimet e tranzicionit: Qeveria e stabilitetit, një marrëveshje politike apo një kompromis i përkohshëm? (in Albanian), Uet Press, ISBN 978-9928-190-75-8
- Dervishi, Kastriot (2005), Historia e shtetit shqiptar 1912–2005: organizimi shtetëror, jeta politike, ngjarjet kryesore, të gjithë ligjvënësit, ministrat dhe kryetarët e shtetit shqiptar në historinë 93-vjeçare të tij (in Albanian), Shtëpia Botuese 55, OCLC 123286739
- "Official Gazette of the Republic of Albania". Center of Official Publications (in Albanian).
