= Prime Minister of Albania =

Head of government

Prime Minister of Republic of Albania
- Kryeministri i Shqipërisë

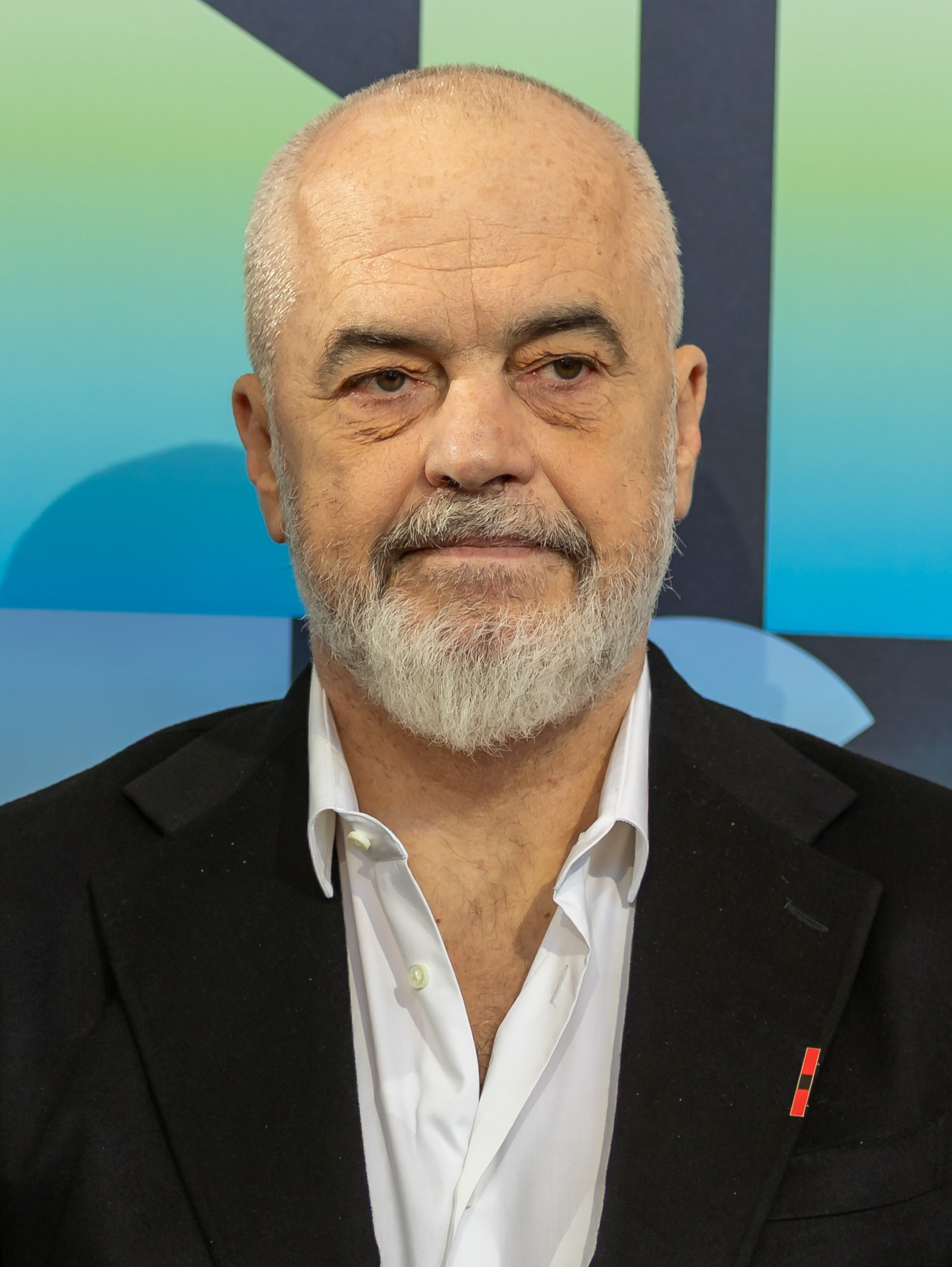
- Incumbent; Edi Rama since 11 September 2013
- Style: His Excellency (diplomatic)
- Type: Head of government
- Member of: Council of Ministers; Parliament
- Residence: Kryeministria
- Seat: Tirana
- Appointer: President; with Parliament confidence
- Term length: Four years, renewable
- Constituting instrument: Constitution of Albania
- Inaugural holder: Ismail Qemali
- Formation: 4 December 1912; 113 years ago
- Deputy: Deputy Prime Minister
- Salary: L228,730
- Website: kryeministria.al

The prime minister of Albania, (Note: Albanian: Kryeministri i Shqipërisë) officially the prime minister of the Republic of Albania, (Note: Albanian: Kryeministri i Republikës së Shqipërisë) is the head of government of Albania. The office of the prime minister is a core institution in the politics of Albania formed after the Albanian declaration of independence on 28 November 1912. Since that time, the nation has navigated a dynamic political evolution spanning distinct periods, encompassing a monarchy, a communist regime and the eventual democratic order. In 1912, Ismail Qemali was inaugurated as the first prime minister of Albania, guiding the nation toward sovereignty amidst the complex conditions in the Balkans. In 1944, Enver Hoxha implemented a radical change in government, transforming Albania into an authoritarian and isolationist communist regime. In 1991, the nation transitioned into a democracy that marked a notable shift, when Fatos Nano emerged as the first post-communist prime minister of Albania.

The office of the prime minister is defined by the constitution of Albania. The appointment begins with general elections, during which parties or political coalitions nominate candidates for the parliament. The leader of the party with the most parliamentary seats becomes a contender for the office of the prime minister. After the results are certified, the president invites the majority leader to propose a prime ministerial candidate who must secure a majority from the parliament for selection. Once selected, the prime minister-elect is mandated to partake in a formal oath-taking ceremony presided over by the president. The prime minister is in charge of forming and guiding the council of ministers, presenting the nation's integral policies and coordinating government institutions. Located in Tirana, the Kryeministria is the official workplace of the prime minister and holds a crucial role in facilitating their duties and those of the council. Since September 2013, Edi Rama from the Albanian Socialist Party has served as prime minister.

== History ==
=== 1912–1990 ===
Following the declaration of independence on 28 November 1912, the establishment of the office of the prime minister became an integral part of the constitutional framework of Albania. Amidst the formative period characterised by tumultuous political and regional conflicts, a series of distinguished ministers assumed the position, each confronted with distinct challenges that left a lasting impact on Albanian politics. Ismail Qemali occupied the mantle of the first prime minister and directed the Albanian people toward the realisation of Independent Albania. Subsequently, during their respective tenures as prime ministers from 1914 to 1920, Turhan Përmeti and Esad Toptani were instrumental in directing Albania through the challenges of World War I. This period was marked by their dedication to preserving the nation's independence in the face of shifting alliances and external interventions. Similarly, the emergence of Ilias Vrioni as prime minister in 1920 occurred in the aftermath of World War I, and Vrioni addressed border disputes with the backing of several major Western nations that guaranteed Albania's sovereignty within the boundaries formed in 1913. Following these developments, Ahmet Zogu served as prime minister in 1922, concentrating on centralising power, modernising the economy and attracting foreign investments. In 1924, Fan Noli's brief tenure saw the introduction of sweeping reforms, including initiatives in education and land distribution aimed at reshaping the socio-economic landscape, alongside the establishment of the Albanian Orthodox Church. Zogu returned as prime minister for a second term in 1925 and further solidified his influence, ultimately transitioning the nation into a monarchy in 1928, with himself as king.

With the global crisis of the Great Depression, Albania grappled with significant economic and financial challenges from 1930 to 1939. The government was tasked with stabilising the economy and fostering socio-economic growth. During this period, a succession of prime ministers, including Kostaq Kotta, Pandeli Evangjeli and Mehdi Frashëri, led the nation. Amid World War II, despite declaring neutrality, Albania was invaded by Italy. Prime Ministers of the era, including Shefqet Vërlaci and Mustafa Merlika-Kruja, assumed significant roles in navigating the challenges posed by foreign occupation. In 1943, Germany occupied the nation, leading to the brief prime ministerial tenures of Rexhep Mitrovica, Fiqri Dine and Ibrahim Biçakçiu during the occupation. With the conclusion of World War II in Albania, the nation entered an unprecedented transformative phase under the leadership of Enver Hoxha, who acceded to the mantle of prime minister in 1944. Hoxha's tenure was marked by a commitment to Marxism–Leninism, resulting in the establishment of the People's Republic of Albania in 1946. The regime faced multifaceted challenges, encompassing widespread poverty, illiteracy, healthcare crises, and gender inequality. In response, Hoxha initiated a comprehensive modernisation effort aimed at achieving economic and social progress and transitioning Albania into an industrialised society. Mehmet Shehu served as a prominent figure in Hoxha's government, holding the position of prime minister for a significant part of the communist period, from 1954 to 1981. He played an essential part in implementing the government's policies and exerting influence over the nation's direction. Adil Çarçani succeeded Shehu as prime minister and maintained the position for nine years, maintaining Albania's isolationist stance in external affairs and alignment with the Eastern Bloc countries.

=== 1991–present ===
After the fall of communism, the office of the prime minister of Albania was restored and a democratic order was established. Responding to widespread protests in December 1990, the government of Ramiz Alia of the Party of Labour granted its approval for the first multi-party elections in March 1991 and the subsequent elections in March 1992. This resulted in the legal recognition of the opposition Democratic Party and paved the way for the admission of other political parties, including the Socialist Party. Subsequently, Fatos Nano emerged as the first post-communist prime minister on 22 February 1991. Nano prioritised the establishment of democratic institutions, the implementation of economic reforms and the reintegration of Albania into the international community. On 4 June 1991, Nano resigned from office due to political and social pressure, allowing Ylli Bufi and Vilson Ahmeti to assume the mantle for a short period, respectively. During their tenures, Albania became a member of the Commission on Security and Cooperation in Europe (CSCE). Aleksandër Meksi became prime minister on 13 April 1992 following the Democratic Party's victory in elections in March. His cabinet was dedicated to further advancing democratic and economic development and strengthening Albania's international connections. This commitment culminated to the nation's accession to the Council of Europe (CoE) in July 1995. However, the tenure of Meksi faced criticism for what some perceived as an increasingly authoritarian approach and allegations of corruption. One of the most notable events during his rule was the outbreak of the 1997 Albanian civil unrest that resulted in a humanitarian crisis and an international intervention.

Following the departure of Meksi on 25 March 1997, Bashkim Fino emerged as prime minister with a commitment to holding early elections in June. Fatos Nano secured his second term as prime minister but faced several challenges, notably in assembling a cabinet, which led to his resignation. Pandeli Majko succeeded Nano as prime minister on 28 September 1998 and focused on the preservation of public order and the fight against corruption and organised crime. His cabinet garnered approval for a new constitution through a referendum in November 1998, all amidst continued instability in, and a large influx of refugees from, Albanian-speaking Kosovo. With the resignation of Majko on 29 October 1999, Ilir Meta emerged as prime minister and served until his resignation on 29 January 2002. Following Majko's return for his second term on 7 February 2002, Nano assumed the mantle for his third term as prime minister until 3 July 2005. In the July 2005 elections, Sali Berisha emerged as prime minister with a dedication to sustainable economic development and advancing Albania toward European Union (EU) and North Atlantic Treaty Organization (NATO) membership. The tenure of Berisha achieved a major milestone when the nation secured NATO membership in April 2009. However, his leadership was marred by increasing allegations of corruption, misappropriation of public funds and interference in public processes. Edi Rama occupied the role as prime minister for three consecutive terms following his party's victory in the July 2013 elections. Under his guidance, Albania achieved consistent economic growth and made continuous progress toward EU membership through a series of reforms aimed at socio-economic revitalisation, reinforcement of the rule of law, enhancement of the judicial system and transparency in governance.

== Appointment ==
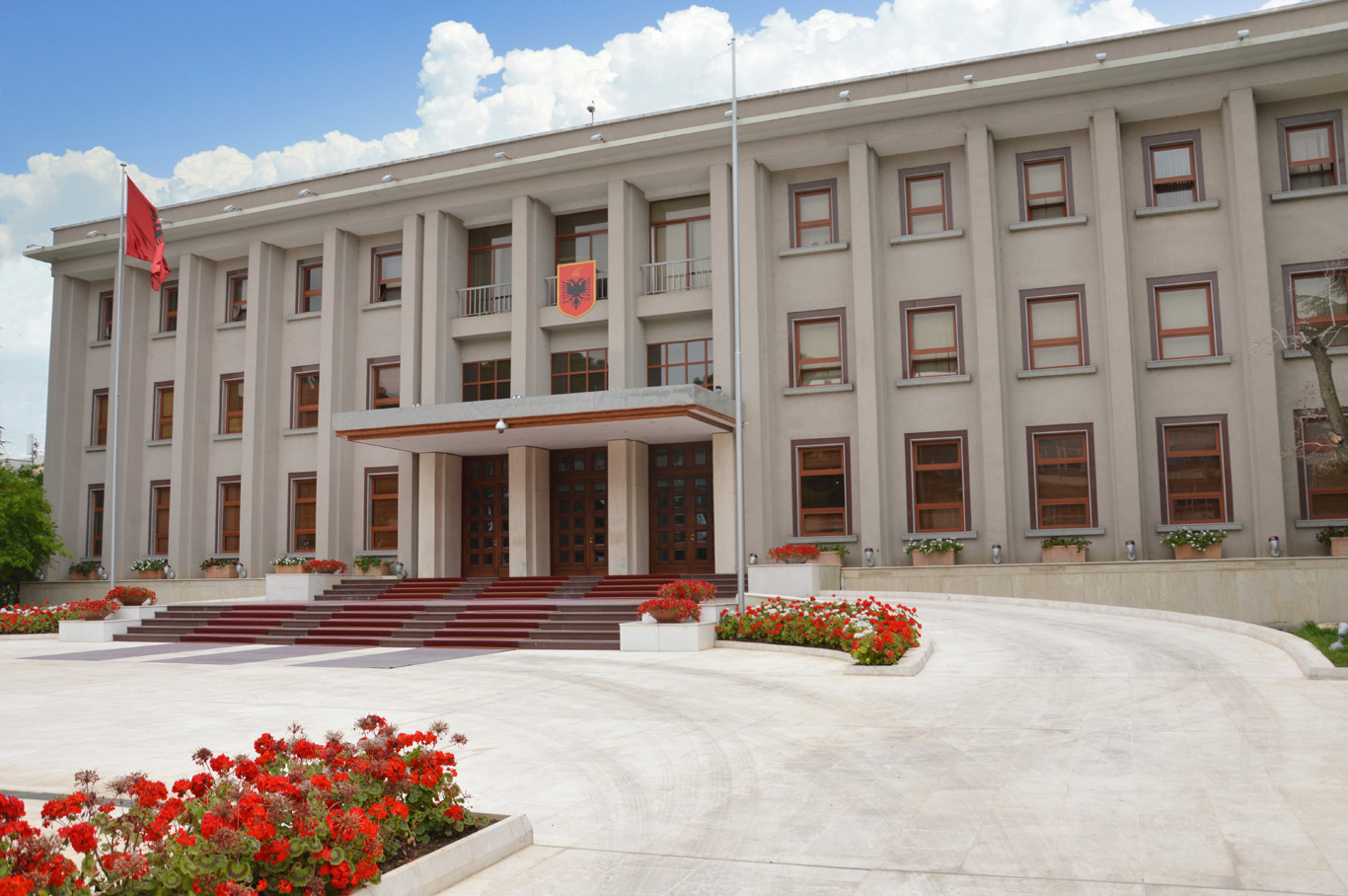
Before assuming office, the prime minister takes the oath of office in a formal ceremony at the Presidenca overseen by the president.

The process of selecting the prime minister of Albania begins with the conducting of general elections, in which the members of the parliament are elected through a proportional representation system for four-year terms. Political parties or coalitions nominate their candidates for the members of parliament. The leader of the party or coalition which secures the most seats in the parliament emerges as a contender for the role of the prime minister. Once the election results receive official certification, the president extends an invitation to the leader of the party or coalition with the parliamentary majority, urging them to propose a candidate for the position. The nominated candidate subsequently seeks approval from the parliament, with the members of the parliament casting their votes either in favor or against the proposed candidate. The candidate must garner a majority of affirmative votes to secure appointment, thereby confirming their selection as the prime minister. In the event that the appointed prime minister does not secure approval from the parliament, a 10-day window is provided for the president to nominate a new candidate. If, once more, the parliament does not endorse this subsequent nominee, it is granted an additional 10-day period to designate an alternative prime minister. If the parliament remains unable to successfully elect a new prime minister within these defined timeframes, the president retains the prerogative to dissolve the parliament.

Before assuming the office, the prime minister-elect is mandated to partake in a formal oath-taking ceremony presided over by the president. The ceremony, conducted in compliance with the guidelines of the constitution, marks the commencement of the minister's official functions. During the oath, the prime minister affirms their allegiance to the constitution and laws, making a commitment to fulfill the functions of their office and prioritise the welfare of the Albanian people:

Albanian: Betohem se do t'i bindem Kushtetutës dhe ligjeve të vendit, do të respektoj të drejtat dhe liritë e shtetasve, do të mbroj pavarësinë e Republikës së Shqipërisë dhe do t'i shërbej interesit të përgjithshëm dhe përparimit të popullit Shqiptar. Zoti më ndihmoftë!

English: I swear that I will obey to the Constitution and laws of the nation, that I will respect the rights and freedoms of citizens, protect the independence of the Republic of Albania, and I will serve the general interest and the progress of the Albanian people. May God help me!

== Functions ==
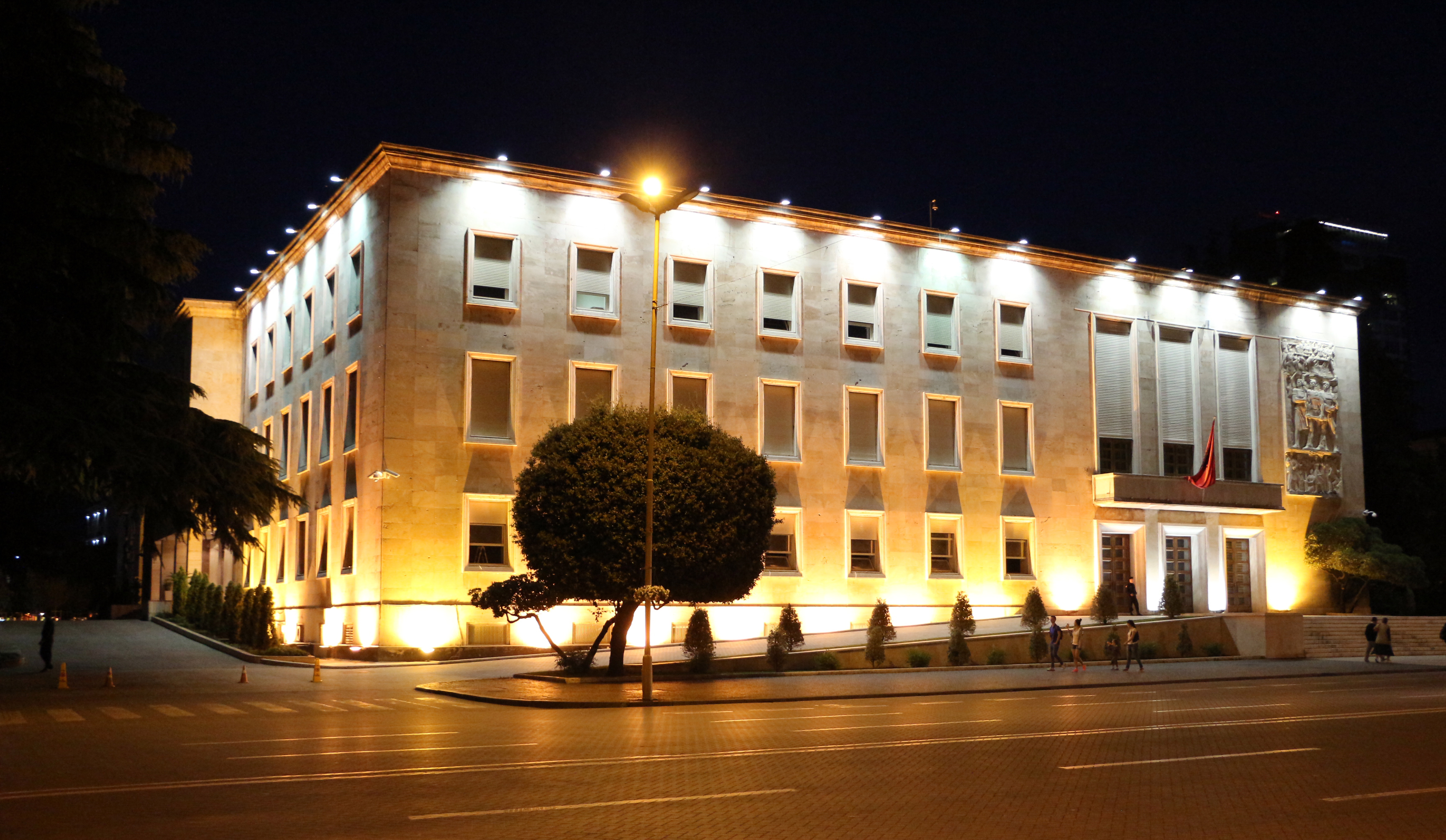
Kryeministria at the Dëshmorët e Kombit Boulevard in Tirana is the official residence and workplace of the prime minister of Albania.

Located at Dëshmorët e Kombit Boulevard in Tirana, the Kryeministria operates as the official workplace of the prime minister and assumes a central role in facilitating the functions of the prime minister and the council of ministers. According to the constitution, the office of the prime minister holds an integral position in the executive arm of government as the head of government. One of the core functions of the prime minister is to form and lead the council of ministers, which include the deputy prime minister and several other ministers. The prime minister selects the members of the council and proposes their appointments for approval by the president. The prime minister is also entrusted with the duty of formulating and presenting the principal general policies of the nation. This task involves ensuring the implementation of legislation endorsed by the council of ministers. Further to these core functions, the prime minister takes on the office of coordinating and supervising the work of both the council and other significant institutions of the government. This ensures the efficient operation of the framework of the government, the resolution of potential conflicts among ministers, the issuance of necessary instructions and an overall contribution to the efficient administration of government functions.

The prime minister has the ability to propose a motion of confidence to the parliament, focusing on significant matters related to bill or decision approval. This motion cannot involve investigations, appointments, immunity or parliamentary functioning. The duration of debate is determined by the conference of chairpersons, with a minimum of 3 minutes per deputy. Voting occurs after at least 3 days from the presentation of the motion. If the motion fails, the prime minister can request the dissolution of the parliament within 48 hours, with the president dissolving parliament within 10 days of the request. Importantly, a motion of confidence cannot be proposed during the consideration of a motion of no confidence. When the prime minister is absent or incapacitated, the deputy prime minister assumes the role of second-in-command to maintain the uninterrupted functioning of the government. Their appointment and dismissal are determined by the council of ministers based on the recommendation of the prime minister.

== List ==
List of prime ministers of Albania
No.	Portrait	Name	Term			Party	Government	Ref.
No.	Portrait	Name	Start	End	Duration	Party	Government	Ref.
Independent Albania (1912 – 1914)
1	Photograph	Ismail Qemali (1844 – 1919)	4 December 1912	22 January 1914	1 year, 1 month and 26 days	Independent	Provisional	
–	Photograph	International Control Commission	22 January 1914	14 March 1914	1 month and 24 days	Independent	Members	
Principality of Albania (1914 – 1925)
2	Photograph	Turhan Përmeti (1846 – 1927)	14 March 1914	3 September 1914	5 months and 18 days	Independent	Përmeti (I and II)	
3	Photograph	Essad Toptani (1863 – 1920)	5 October 1914	27 January 1916	1 year, 3 months and 23 days	Independent	Toptani	
–	Photograph	Turhan Përmeti (1846 – 1927)	25 December 1918	29 January 1920	1 year, 1 month and 5 days	Independent	Përmeti III	
4	Photograph	Sulejman Delvina (1884 – 1933)	30 January 1920	14 November 1920	9 months and 16 days	Independent	Delvinal	
5	Photograph	Ilias Vrioni (1882 – 1932)	15 November 1920	16 October 1921	11 months and 2 days	Independent	Vrioni (I and II)	
6	Photograph	Pandeli Evangjeli (1859 – 1949)	16 October 1921	6 December 1921	1 month and 21 days	Independent	Evangjeli	
7	Photograph	Qazim Koculi (1887 – 1943)	6 December 1921	6 December 1921	1 day	Independent	Koculi	
8	Photograph	Hasan Prishtina (1873 – 1933)	7 December 1921	12 December 1921	6 days	Independent	Prishtina	
9	Photograph	Idhomen Kosturi (1873 – 1943)	12 December 1921	24 December 1921	13 days	Independent	Kosturi	
10	Photograph	Xhafer Ypi (1880 – 1940)	24 December 1921	2 December 1922	11 months and 9 days	Popular	Ypi	
11	Photograph	Ahmet Zogu (1895 – 1961)	2 December 1922	25 February 1924	1 year, 2 months and 24 days	Conservative	Zogu	
12	Photograph	Shefqet Vërlaci (1877 – 1946)	3 March 1924	27 May 1924	2 months and 25 days	Progressive	Vërlaci	
–	Photograph	Ilias Vrioni (1882 – 1932)	31 May 1924	10 June 1924	11 days	Independent	Vrioni III	
13	Photograph	Fan Noli (1882 – 1965)	16 June 1924	24 December 1924	6 months and 9 days	Liberal	Noli	
Albanian Republic (1925 – 1928) (Note: During the period, the office of the prime minister was exercised by the Minister of Justice, which included Hiqmet Delvina, Josif Kedhi, Petro Poga, Milto Tutulani and Ilias Vrioni.)
–	Photograph	Ahmet Zogu (1895 – 1961)	6 January 1925	31 January 1925	8 months and 18 days	Conservative	Zogu II	
Albanian Kingdom (1928 – 1939)
14	Photograph	Kostaq Kotta (1886 – 1947)	5 September 1928	5 March 1930	1 year, 6 months and 1 day	Independent	Kotta	
–	Photograph	Pandeli Evangjeli (1859 – 1949)	6 March 1930	16 October 1935	5 years, 7 months and 11 days	Independent	Evangjeli (II, III and IV)	
15	Photograph	Mehdi Frashëri (1872 – 1963)	21 October 1935	7 November 1936	1 year and 18 days	Independent	Frashëri	
–	Photograph	Kostaq Kotta (1886 – 1947)	9 November 1936	7 April 1939	2 years, 4 months and 30 days	Independent	Kotta II	
Italian Albania (1939 – 1943)
–	Photograph	Shefqet Vërlaci (1877 – 1946)	12 April 1939	3 December 1941	2 years, 7 months and 22 days	Fascist	Vërlaci II	
16	Photograph	Mustafa Merlika-Kruja (1887 – 1958)	4 December 1941	4 January 1943	1 year, 1 month and 1 day	Fascist	Merlika-Kruja	
17	Photograph	Ekrem Libohova (1882 – 1948)	18 January 1943	11 February 1943	25 days	Fascist	Libohova	
18	Photograph	Maliq Bushati (1890 – 1946)	12 February 1943	28 April 1943	2 months and 17 days	Fascist	Bushati	
–	Photograph	Ekrem Libohova (1882 – 1948)	11 May 1943	10 September 1943	4 months	Fascist	Libohova II	
German occupation of Albania (1943 – 1944)
19	Photograph	Rexhep Mitrovica (1887 – 1967)	5 November 1943	16 June 1944	7 months and 12 days	National Front	Mitrovica	
20	Photograph	Fiqri Dine (1897 – 1960)	18 July 1944	29 August 1944	1 month and 12 days	National Front	Dine	
21	Photograph	Ibrahim Biçakçiu (1905 – 1977)	29 August 1944	20 October 1944	1 month and 22 days	National Front	Biçaku	
People's Socialist Republic of Albania (1944 – 1991)
22	Photograph	Enver Hoxha (1908 – 1985)	20 October 1944	19 July 1954	9 years and 9 months	Labour	Hoxha (I, II and III)	
23	Photograph	Mehmet Shehu (1913 – 1981)	19 July 1954	17 December 1981	27 years, 4 months and 29 days	Labour	Shehu (I, II, III, IV, V, VI and VII)	
24	Photograph	Adil Çarçani (1922 – 1997)	18 December 1982	22 February 1991	9 years, 2 months and 5 days	Labour	Çarçani (I, II and III)	
Republic of Albania (1991 – present)
25	Photograph	Fatos Nano (1952 – 2025)	22 February 1991	4 June 1991	3 months and 14 days	Socialist	Nano (I and II)	
26	Photograph	Ylli Bufi (born 1948)	5 June 1991	10 December 1991	6 months and 6 days	Socialist	Stability	
27	Photograph	Vilson Ahmeti (born 1951)	10 December 1991	4 April 1992	3 months and 26 days	Socialist	Ahmeti	
28	Photograph	Aleksandër Meksi (born 1939)	13 April 1992	25 March 1997	4 years, 11 months and 13 days	Democrat	Meksi (I and II)	
29	Photograph	Bashkim Fino (1962 – 2021)	13 March 1997	25 July 1997	4 months and 13 days	Socialist	Fino	
–	Photograph	Fatos Nano (1952 – 2025)	25 July 1997	28 September 1998	1 year, 2 months and 4 days	Socialist	Nano III	
30	Photograph	Pandeli Majko (born 1967)	28 September 1998	29 October 1999	1 year, 1 month and 2 days	Socialist	Majko	
31	Photograph	Ilir Meta (born 1969)	29 October 1999	29 January 2002	2 years, 3 months and 1 day	Socialist	Meta (I and II)	
–	Photograph	Pandeli Majko (born 1967)	7 February 2002	24 July 2002	5 months and 18 days	Socialist	Majko II	
–	Photograph	Fatos Nano (1952 – 2025)	24 July 2002	8 September 2005	3 years, 1 month and 16 days	Socialist	Nano IV	
32	Photograph	Sali Berisha (born 1944)	8 September 2005	11 September 2013	8 years and 4 days	Democrat	Berisha (I and II)	
33	Photograph	Edi Rama (born 1964)	11 September 2013	Incumbent	13 years, 2 months and 3 days	Socialist	Rama (I, II, III and IV)	

== Timeline ==
This is a graphical lifespan timeline of the heads of government of Albania. They are listed in order of first assuming office.

The following chart lists heads of government by lifespan (living heads of government on the green line), with the years outside of their tenure in beige. Heads of government with an unknown birth date or death date are shown with only their tenure or their earlier or later life.

The following chart shows heads of government by their age (living heads of government in green), with the years of their tenure in blue. Heads of government with an unknown birth or death date are excluded. The vertical black line at 18 years indicates the minimum age to be a member of the Parliament of Albania—which is required to be prime minister—as of now.

== See also ==
- Politics of Albania
- Council of Ministers of Albania
- Deputy Prime Minister of Albania
