= Noli Government =

Short-lived revolutionary government of Albania in 1924

- 7th Government of Albania
- June–December 1924
- Date formed: 16 June 1924
- Date dissolved: 24 December 1924

People and organisations
- Head of State: High Council of State
- Prime Minister: Fan Noli
- No. of ministers: 7

History
- Predecessor: Delvina Government
- Successor: Zogu I Government

The Noli Government (Albanian: Qeveria e Fan Nolit) was the seventh ruling government of Albania, formed on 16 June 1924 following the success of the June Revolution. The government was led by Fan Noli, an Orthodox bishop, intellectual, and political reformer, who assumed office as Prime Minister with a reformist and anti-feudal agenda.

The Noli Government sought to implement a program of deep political, economic, and social reforms, commonly referred to as the Twenty-Point Program, which aimed at democratization, land reform, judicial independence, modernization of public administration, and the reduction of foreign influence in Albanian affairs.

Despite its ambitious agenda, the government lacked strong internal support, financial resources, and international recognition. On 24 December 1924, it was overthrown by forces loyal to Ahmet Zogu, who returned to power with external backing, forcing Fan Noli into exile.

== Cabinet ==
Noli Government
Fan Noli – Prime Minister
Sulejman Delvina – Minister of Foreign Affairs
Kasëm Qafëzezi – Minister of War
Luigj Gurakuqi – Minister of Finance
Stavro Vinjau – Minister of Justice and Education
Qazim Koculi – Minister of Public Works and Agriculture
Xhemal Bushati – Minister without Portfolio

== Legacy ==
Although short-lived, the Noli Government remains one of the most symbolically significant administrations in Albanian history. It is often remembered as an early attempt to establish democratic governance, social justice, and political modernization in Albania. Fan Noli's reformist vision has continued to influence Albanian political thought and historiography.

== See also ==
- Politics of Albania
- June Revolution (Albania)
- Fan Noli
- Ahmet Zogu
