= Nano I Government =

Nano I Government Qeveria e Parë Nano
- 50nd Government of Albania
- February–May 1991
- Date formed: 22 February 1991
- Date dissolved: 11 May 1991 (79 days)

People and organisations
- Chairman of the Presidium of the People's Assembly: Ramiz Alia
- Prime Minister: Fatos Nano
- Deputy Prime Minister: Shkëlqim Cani
- Member parties: PPSH
- Status in legislature: Dictatorship
- Opposition parties: PD, PR, PSD, PA
- Opposition leader: Sali Berisha

History
- Outgoing election: 1987 election
- Legislature term: Constitutional Assembly
- Incoming formation: Temporarily appointed
- Predecessor: Çarçani IV Government
- Successor: Nano II Government

The first Government of Prime Minister Fatos Nano was an emergency government that served as the 50th Government of Albania. The country's reformation as the Republic of Albania in the middle of this cabinet, on 29 April 1991, made this the final cabinet of the People's Socialist Republic of Albania.

== History ==
On 21 February 1991, Ramiz Alia, Chairman of the Presidium of the Albanian People's Assembly and First Secretary of the Party of Labor of Albania, assumed personal control over the government of Albania and announced that he would replace Adil Çarçani and his 23-member cabinet. Alia promptly appointed Deputy Prime Minister Fatos Nano to lead this new government, who was considered a reformist economist. Shkëlqim Cani, who served as Deputy Prime Minister alongside Nano, was kept in his position. All other cabinet members were newly appointed.

On 29 April 1991, the People's Socialist Republic was reformed as the Republic of Albania. On 30 April 1991, Ramiz Alia officially began his term as Albania's first president since 1928.

The majority of the cabinet resigned on 10 May 1991 and a new cabinet was announced. Aside from Nano, only two ministers were retained. The primary motivation for the change of cabinet was an attempt by the People's Assembly to bolster morale.

== Cabinet ==
Portfolio	Minister	Took office	Left office
Prime Minister	Fatos Nano	22 February 1991	11 May 1991
Deputy Prime Minister	Shkëlqim Cani	22 February 1991	11 May 1991
Minister Secretary-General of Council of Ministers	Aleks Luarasi	22 February 1991	11 May 1991
Ministry of Finances	Qemal Disha	22 February 1991	11 May 1991
Ministry of Internal Affairs	Gramoz Ruçi	22 February 1991	11 May 1991
Ministry of People's Defence	Kiço Mustaqi	22 February 1991	11 May 1991
Ministry of Foreign Affairs	Muhamet Kapllani	22 February 1991	11 May 1991
Ministry of Justice	Dashnor Kore	22 February 1991	11 May 1991
Ministry of Economy	Unknown (Note: While the minister is not known, this cabinet position was in existence at the time of Nano's first cabinet.)	22 February 1991	11 May 1991
Ministry of Education	Kastriot Islami	22 February 1991	11 May 1991
Ministry of Agriculture	Ahmet Osja	22 February 1991	11 May 1991
Ministry of Construction	Leonard Nano	22 February 1991	11 May 1991
Ministry of Health	Sabit Brokaj	22 February 1991	11 May 1991
Ministry of Culture, Youth and Sports	Unknown	22 February 1991	11 May 1991
Ministry of Transport	Salvador Franja	22 February 1991	11 May 1991
Ministry of Industry, Mines and Energy	Drini Mezini	22 February 1991	11 May 1991
Ministry of Food and Light Industry	Ylli Bufi	22 February 1991	11 May 1991
Ministry of Foreign Economic Relations	Shane Korbeci	22 February 1991	11 May 1991
Ministry of Domestic Trade	Altin Ylli	22 February 1991	11 May 1991

== See also ==
- Council of Ministers (Albania)
