= Nano II Government =

51st government of Albania

Nano II Government Qeveria e Dytë Nano
- 51nd Government of Albania
- May–June 1991
- Date formed: 11 May 1991
- Date dissolved: 12 June 1991 (33 days)

People and organisations
- President: Ramiz Alia
- Prime Minister: Fatos Nano
- Deputy Prime Minister: Shkëlqim Cani
- No. of ministers: 22
- Total no. of members: 25 (Note: Including the Prime Minister, Deputy Prime Minister, and the Secretary General the government consisted of 19 members. In addition, 3 other members were Chairman of Committees)
- Member parties: PPSH
- Status in legislature: Majority government
- Opposition parties: PD, PR, PSD, PA
- Opposition leader: Sali Berisha

History
- Outgoing election: 1991 election
- Legislature term: People's Assembly
- Outgoing formation: 1991 protests in Shkodër
- Predecessor: Nano I Government
- Successor: Government of Stability

The second Government of Prime Minister Fatos Nano was the 51st Government of Albania. Although in office for a few weeks, it was considered the first government to emerge from the multi-party elections, as well as the last Labour Party government who had ruled the country for almost 50 years.

== History ==
Aside from Nano, only two ministers were retained. The primary motivation for the change of cabinet was an attempt by the People's Assembly to bolster morale.

== Cabinet ==
The cabinet consisted of 25 members, where in addition to the prime minister, deputy minister and secretary general, there were 19 ministers. 2 were chairpersons of committees and Bujar Kolaneci Chairman of the State Audit Commission.

Portfolio	Minister	Took office	Left office
Prime Minister	Fatos Nano	11 May 1991	12 June 1991
Deputy Prime Minister	Shkëlqim Cani	11 May 1991	12 June 1991
Minister Secretary-General of Council of Ministers	Zyhdi Pepa	11 May 1991	12 June 1991
Ministry of Finances	Anastas Angjeli	11 May 1991	12 June 1991
Ministry of Public Order	Hajredin Shyti	11 May 1991	12 June 1991
Ministry of People's Defence	Ndriçim Karakashi	11 May 1991	12 June 1991
Ministry of Foreign Affairs	Muhamet Kapllani	11 May 1991	12 June 1991
Ministry of Justice	Fatmir Zaloshnja	11 May 1991	12 June 1991
Ministry of Economy	Leontiev Çuçi	11 May 1991	12 June 1991
Ministry of Education	Maqo Lakrori	11 May 1991	12 June 1991
Ministry of Agriculture	Nexhmedin Dumani	11 May 1991	12 June 1991
Ministry of Construction	Leonard Nano	11 May 1991	12 June 1991
Ministry of Health	Sabit Brokaj	11 May 1991	12 June 1991
Ministry of Youth, Culture and Sports	Moikom Zeqo	11 May 1991	12 June 1991
Ministry of Transport	Kostandin Hoxha	11 May 1991	12 June 1991
Ministry of Industry	Vilson Ahmeti	11 May 1991	12 June 1991
Ministry of Mineral Resources and Energy	Drini Mezini	11 May 1991	12 June 1991
Ministry of Labor and Social Protection	Theodhori Bej	11 May 1991	12 June 1991
Ministry of Food	Ylli Bufi	11 May 1991	12 June 1991
Ministry of Foreign Economic Relations	Shane Korbeci	11 May 1991	12 June 1991
Ministry of Domestic Trade and Tourism	Gavrosh Pogaçe	11 May 1991	12 June 1991
Ministry of Municipal Economy and Environment Protection	Flamur Hoxha	11 May 1991	12 June 1991
Chairman of the State Audit Commission	Bujar Kolaneci	11 May 1991	12 June 1991
Chairman of the National Security Committee	Gramoz Ruçi	11 May 1991	12 June 1991
Chairman of the Science and Technology Committee	Petrit Skëndi	11 May 1991	12 June 1991

== See also ==
- Council of Ministers (Albania)
