= Ministry of Defence (Albania) =

Government ministry of Albania

- Ministria e Mbrojtjës
- Coat of Arms of the Ministry

Department overview
- Formed: 4 December 1912; 113 years ago
- Jurisdiction: Council of Ministers
- Headquarters: Tirana, Albania
- Minister responsible: Ermal Nufi
- Website: www.mod.gov.al

The Ministry of Defence (Albanian: Ministria e Mbrojtjes) is a department of the Albanian Government, in charge of the formation and implementation of national security and ordering, coordinating and carrying out the general guidelines of the Cabinet about the defence policy, and is the headquarters of the Military of Albania. It is Albania's ministry of defence.

The Defence Minister of Albania is the nominal head of all the military, serving under the President of Albania, who is the commander-in-chief of the Armed Forces of Albania. The defence minister exercises the administrative and operational authority over the military. The armed forces under the Ministry of Defence are primarily responsible for ensuring the territorial integrity of the nation.

== Structure ==
The Ministry of Defence includes numerous smaller agencies aside from the three main branches of the military. These include the Authority of the State Export Control, the Military Export Import Company, the Center of Culture, Media, and Defence Publications, the Inter-Institutional Maritime Operation Centre, and the Defence Intelligence Security Agency. These agencies, centers, and offices report to the Minister of Defence.

=== Authority of the State Export Control ===
The Authority of the State Export Control (AKSHE) (Albanian: Autoriteti i Kontrollit Shtetëror të Eksporteve) is the agency tasked with controlling the export, import, and transportation of military goods.

=== Centre of Culture, Media, and Defence Publications ===
The Centre of Culture, Media, and Defence Publications (QKMBM) (Albanian: Qendra e Kulturës, Medias, Botimeve të Mbrojtjes, Muzeut dhe Shtëpive të Pushimit) is an organization involved in public relations and general communications for the Ministry of Defence. It is itself composed of the Directorate of Public Relations and Communications, the Directorate of Publications, the Directorate of the Community Relations Activities, and the Directorate of Sports Activities.

=== Inter-Institutional Maritime Operation Centre ===
The Inter-Institutional Maritime Operation Centre (IMOC) (Albanian: Qendra Ndërinstitucionale Operacionale Detare) is an inter-ministry agency tasked with managing Albania's maritime territory. It is a collaboration between the Ministries of Defence, Internal Affairs, Finance, Environment, Transportation, Agriculture, and Tourism.

=== Defence Intelligence Security Agency ===
The Defence Intelligence Security Agency (DISA) (Albanian: Agjencia e Inteligjencës dhe Sigurisë së Mbrojtjes (AISM)) is a military intelligence agency within the Ministry of Defence, which provides intelligence to the Ministry as well as the Albanian Armed Forces. It is governed by Law No. 65/2014.

== Reorganization ==
Since the establishment of the institution, the Ministry of Defence has undergone several administrative changes to its organizational structure. When a new department was formed, it often merged with the ministry thus expanding its role, subsequently leading to the name of the ministry being changed. If that department later broke off as a separate ministry or was dissolved, the ministry reverted to its original name. (Note: The title "Substitutive" (gheg albanian: Zavëndësisht), often using the acronym "Zav.", references to the temporary exercise of duty by an official who was not formally appointed by the prime minister but occupied the interim role of the vacant minister. These officials are labeled in the list with an asterisk.) (Note: The start date of a minister's term and subsequently their relief from duty are made official in a decision signed by the assembly speaker that approves the president's decree, with such decision being published in Fletorja Zyrtare.)

- Ministry of War (1912–1939)
- Ministry of War and Defence Command (1944–1946)
- Ministry of National Defence (1946–1950)
- Ministry of People's Defence (1950–1991)
- Ministry of Defence (1991–present)

== Subordinate institutions ==
- Armed Forces Academy
- Export Control State Authority (AKSHE)
- Center of Culture, Media and Defence Publications (QKMBM)
- Inter-Institutional Marine Operation Centre (QNOD)

== Officeholders (1912–present) ==
No.	Portrait	Name (born–died)	Term of office			Political party	Cabinet(s)	Ref.
No.	Portrait	Name (born–died)	Took office	Left office	Time in office	Political party	Cabinet(s)	Ref.
1		Mehmet Pashë Deralla (1843–1918)	4 December 1912	24 January 1914	1 year, 51 days	Independent	Provisional Government	
2		Essad Toptani (1863/1875–1920)	14 March 1914	13 April 1975	67 days	Independent	Përmeti I	
3		Kara Seit Pasha	August 1914	3 September 1914	1 month	Independent	Përmeti II	
4		Isuf Dibra (?–1927)	5 October 1914	27 January 1916	1 year, 114 days	Independent	Toptani	
Austro-Hungarian occupation of Albania (1916–1918)
5		Ali Riza Kolonja (1880–1930)	30 January 1920	4 November 1920	279 days	Independent	Delvina	
6		Selahudin Shkoza (1867–1930)	15 November 1920	16 October 1921	335 days	Independent	Vrioni I–II	
7		Isuf Gjinali (1874–1930)	16 October 1921	6 December 1921	51 days	Independent	Evangjeli	
8		Zija Dibra (1890–1940)	6 December 1921	12 December 1921	6 days	Independent	Prishtina	
9		Shefki Kosturi (1878–?)	12 December 1921	24 December 1921	12 days	Independent	Kosturi	
10		Ismail Haki Tatzati (1878–1945)	24 December 1921	19 August 1923	1 year, 238 days	Independent	Ypi; Zogu I	
11		Mustafa Aranitasi (1872–1961)	19 August 1923	25 February 1924	190 days	Independent	Zogu I	
11		Mustafa Aranitasi (1872–1961)	30 May 1924	10 June 1924	11 days	Independent	Vrioni III	
12		Kasem Qafëzezi (1881–1931)	16 June 1924	24 December 1924	191 days	Independent	Noli	
13		Enver Hoxha (1908–1985)	23 October 1944	31 July 1953	8 years, 281 days	Party of Labour	Hoxha I–II–III–IV–V–VI	
14		Beqir Balluku (1917–1975)	1 August 1953	28 October 1974	21 years, 88 days	Party of Labour	Hoxha VII; Shehu I–II–III–IV–V–VI–VII–VIII–IX	
15		Mehmet Shehu (1913–1981)	28 October 1974	26 April 1980	7 years, 51 days	Party of Labour	Shehu X–XI–XII	
16		Kadri Hazbiu (1922–1983)	26 April 1980	10 October 1982	268 days	Party of Labour	Çarçani I	
17		Prokop Murra (1921–2005)	10 October 1982	7 July 1990	7 years, 270 days	Party of Labour	Çarçani I–II–III–IV	
18		Kiço Mustaqi (1938–2019)	8 July 1990	10 May 1991	306 days	Party of Labour	Çarçani V–VI	
19		Ndriçim Karakaçi (born 1950)	11 May 1991	4 June 1991	24 days	Socialist Party	Nano I–II	
20		Perikli Teta (1941–2007)	11 June 1991	6 December 1991	178 days	Democratic Party	Bufi	
21		Alfred Moisiu (born 1929)	18 December 1991	13 April 1992	117 days	Independent	Ahmeti	
22		Safet Zhulali (1944–2002)	13 April 1992	1 March 1997	4 years, 322 days	Democratic Party	Meksi I–II–III–IV	
23		Shaqir Vukaj (born 1942)	11 March 1997	24 July 1997	135 days	Socialist Party	Fino	
24		Sabit Brokaj (1942–2020)	25 July 1997	23 April 1998	272 days	Socialist Party	Nano III	
25		Luan Hajdaraga (1948–2018)	23 April 1998	8 July 2000	2 years, 76 days	Socialist Party	Majko I Meta I	
26		Ilir Gjoni (born 1962)	8 July 2000	9 November 2000	124 days		Meta I	
27		Ismail Lleshi (born 1947)	9 November 2000	6 September 2001	301 days	Socialist Party	Meta I	
28		Pandeli Majko (born 1967)	6 September 2001	29 January 2002	145 days	Socialist Party	Meta II	
29		Luan Rama (born )	22 February 2002	25 July 2002	153 days	Socialist Party	Majko II	
(28)		Pandeli Majko (born 1967)	29 July 2002	10 September 2005	3 years, 43 days	Socialist Party	Nano IV–V	
30		Fatmir Mediu (born 1967)	11 September 2005	21 March 2008	2 years, 192 days	Republican Party	Berisha I	
31		Gazmend Oketa (born 1968)	28 March 2008	17 September 2009	1 year, 173 days	Republican Party	Berisha I	
32		Arben Imami (born 1958)	17 September 2009	15 September 2013	3 years, 363 days	Democratic Party	Berisha II	
33		Mimi Kodheli (born 1964)	15 September 2013	13 September 2017	3 years, 363 days	Socialist Party	Rama I	
34		Olta Xhaçka (born 1979)	13 September 2017	31 December 2020	3 years, 109 days	Socialist Party	Rama II	
35		Niko Peleshi (born 1970)	4 January 2021	30 July 2024	3 years, 208 days	Socialist Party	Rama II–III	
36		Pirro Vengu (born 1986)	30 July 2024	26 February 2026	1 year, 211 days	Socialist Party	Rama III–IV	
37		Ermal Nufi (born 19?)	6 March 2026	Incumbent	260 days	Socialist Party	Rama IV	

== See also ==
- Military of Albania
