= Council of Ministers (Albania) =

Executive body of the Albanian government

- Këshilli i Ministrave

Overview
- Established: 4 December 1912
- State: Republic of Albania
- Leader: Prime Minister
- Appointed by: President of the Republic
- Ministries: 17 (Note: Not including the Office of the Prime Minister)
- Responsible to: Parliament of Albania
- Headquarters: Dëshmorët e Kombit Boulevard 7, 1010 Tirana, Albania
- Website: kryeministria.al

The Council of Ministers (Albanian: Këshilli i Ministrave) is the principal executive organ of the Albanian government. The Council is led by the Prime Minister of Albania and includes 17 other ministers, nominated by the Prime Minister and confirmed by the Albanian parliament. The Council is responsible for carrying out both foreign and domestic policies. It directs and controls the activities of the ministries its members lead as well as other executive state bodies.

The Prime Minister is nominated by the President of Albania based on the proposal of the majority party or coalition in the parliament. The nominee must then secure a vote of confidence in parliament to be appointed. If the parliament does not have confidence in the nominee, the President presents another within 10 days. (Note: If the second nomination of the President once again fails to secure the confidence of the parliament, then the parliament itself must nominate the Prime Minister with a majority vote. If it fails to do so, the President dissolves the parliament.) Once appointed, the Prime Minister presents his policy program and proposed cabinet before the Parliament where the government, as a whole, is confirmed.

The Deputy Prime Minister takes over the functions of the prime minister in his absence.

== Overview ==
=== Rank ===
Council members are subdivided into three substantial ranks, along with one honorary rank:

- Prime Minister,
- Deputy Prime Minister,
- Ministers, which are the highest-ranking members of the Government
- Deputy Ministers, that assist ministers in specialized areas of their portfolio and
- General Secretaries (Sekretari i Përgjithshëm) that assist ministers in less important areas and occasionally attend sessions of the Council of Ministers.

=== Role ===
The Council is responsible to the Parliament of Albania. The Parliament can pass a motion of no confidence or refuse to pass a motion of confidence, forcing the Prime Minister and the Council of Ministers to resign. This has the effect of forcing the Government to be composed of members from the majority political party in the Assembly or to be allied to the majority in a coalition.

Ministers are required to answer written or oral questions put to them by members of Parliament. In addition, ministers attend sessions of the Parliament when laws concerning their departmental portfolios are under consideration. While neither ministers nor the Prime Minister are required to be members of parliament, many often are.

The Council of Ministers can propose bills to Parliament. These government proposals very rarely fail, given the government should, theoretically, always enjoy the confidence of parliament and therefore have a majority for any legislation it would like to pass.

The Council can also unilaterally release binding secondary legislation, known as Decisions of the Council of Ministers (Albanian: Vendime të Këshillit të Ministrave - VKM), based on the powers granted to it in primary legislation passed by Parliament.

== History ==
With the unilateral declaration of Albania's Independence on 28 November 1912 by the Ottoman Empire, one of the first governing bodies to emerge from the All-Albanian Congress was the formation of the Provisional Government and the Council of Ministers as the highest executive body in the country. However, the government did not last long due to its non-recognition by some of the Great Powers of the time. On 29 July 1913, Austria-Hungary, France, Great Britain, and Italy, together with Greece and Romania as interested parties, agreed to adopt the Organic Statute of Albania (Statuti Organik i Shqipërisë) which would serve as the first constitution of the new state created. The statute sanctioned since in the 1st Article that Albania was a constitutional, sovereign, and hereditary Principality under the guarantee of the six Great Powers. Its formal adoption took place in Vlorë on 14 January 1914. On 22 January 1914, Ismail Qemali, one of the founders of the Albanian state and head of the Provisional Government, was forced to resign and hand it over to the International Control Commission (Komisioni Ndërkombëtar i Kontrollit të Kufinjve) which would serve as the highest executive body until the appointment of the monarch from the Great Powers and his arrival in Albania.

The Statute in Chapter V entitled § Government Bodies sanctioned the central government institutions, as well as their competencies and duties. Article 72 states: The Albanian Government consists of a Council of Ministers headed by a prime minister. While in the next article it described the composition of the council, where there are a total of 4 ministries, which are: the Ministry of Foreign Affairs, the Ministry of Internal Affairs, the Ministry of Finances and the Ministry of Justice, while the prime minister simultaneously exercised also the role of Minister of Foreign Affairs. The PM, as well as all ministers were appointed by the Prince, whose oath before taking office should be taken, as well as the handover of office after resignation. Although the statute sanctioned only 4 ministries, in the first government appointed by Prince Wilhelm, there were more departments than anticipated.

== Incumbent Government ==
| Portfolio | Minister | Took office | Left office | Party |
|---|---|---|---|---|
| Prime Minister | Edi Rama | 12 September 2025 | Incumbent | PS |
| Deputy Prime Minister | Belinda Balluku | 12 September 2025 | 20 November 2025 (Suspended) | PS |
| Deputy Prime Minister | Albana Koçiu | 26 February 2026 | Incumbent | PS |
| Ministry of Economy and Innovation | Delina Ibrahimaj | 12 September 2025 | Incumbent | PS |
| Ministry of Finance | Petrit Malaj | 12 September 2025 | Incumbent | PS |
| Ministry of Internal Affairs | Albana Koçiu | 19 September 2025 | 26 February 2026 | PS |
| Ministry of Internal Affairs | Besfort Lamallari | 6 March 2026 | 11 September 2026 | PS |
| Ministry of Internal Affairs | Ervin Demo | 11 September 2026 | Incumbent | PS |
| Ministry of Defence | Pirro Vengu | 30 July 2024 | 26 February 2026 | PS |
| Ministry of Defence | Ermal Nufi | 6 March 2026 | Incumbent | PS |
| Ministry for Europe and Foreign Affairs | Elisa Spiropali | 19 September 2025 | 26 February 2026 | PS |
| Ministry for Europe and Foreign Affairs | Ferit Hoxha | 26 February 2026 | Incumbent | PS |
| Ministry of Justice | Besfort Lamallari | 19 September 2025 | 6 March 2026 | PS |
| Ministry of Justice | Toni Gogu | 6 March 2026 | Incumbent | PS |
| Ministry of Infrastructure and Energy | Belinda Balluku | 17 January 2019 | 6 March 2026 | PS |
| Ministry of Infrastructure and Energy | Enea Karakaçi | 6 March 2026 | Incumbent | PS |
| Ministry of Education | Mirela Kumbaro Furxhi | 12 September 2025 | Incumbent | PS |
| Ministry of Agriculture and Rural Development | Andis Salla | 12 September 2025 | Incumbent | PS |
| Ministry of Health and Social Welfare | Evis Sala | 19 September 2025 | 3 September 2026 | PS |
| Ministry of Health and Social Welfare | Klodiana Spahiu | 3 September 2026 | Incumbent | PS |
| Ministry of State for Relations with Parliament | Toni Gogu | 19 September 2025 | 6 March 2026 | PS |
| Ministry of State for Relations with Parliament | Erjona Ismaili | 6 March 2026 | Incumbent | PS |
| Ministry of State and Chief Negotiator | Majlinda Dhuka | 12 September 2025 | Incumbent | PS |
| Ministry of State for Local Government (Abolished in September 2026 and merged into the Ministry of Internal Affairs) | Ervin Demo | 19 September 2025 | 11 September 2026 | PS |
| Ministry of Public Administration (Established on 23 October 2026, succeeding the Ministry of State for Public Administration and Anti-Corruption) | Adea Pirdeni | 23 October 2026 | Incumbent | PS |
| Ministry of Tourism, Culture and Sports | Blendi Gonxhja | 12 September 2025 | Incumbent | PS |
| Ministry of Environment | Sofjan Jaupaj | 12 September 2025 | Incumbent | PS |
| Ministry of State for Artificial Intelligence | None (powered by Diella) | 12 September 2025 | Incumbent | None (AI) |

Source: Kryeministria

== Governments of Albania (1912–present) ==
| No. | Government | Mandate | | Days |
|---|---|---|---|---|
| 1st | Provisional Government | 4 December 1912 | 22 January 1914 | 414 |
| – | International Control Commission | 22 January 1914 | 17 March 1914 | 54 |
| 2nd | Përmeti I Government | 17 March 1914 | 3 September 1914 | 170 |
| 3rd | Toptani Government | 5 October 1914 | 27 January 1916 | 479 |
| – | vacant | 23 January 1916 | 30 October 1918 | 1011 |
| 4th | Government of Durrës | 25 December 1918 | 29 January 1920 | 400 |
| 5th | Delvina Government | 30 January 1920 | 14 November 1920 | 289 |
| 6th | Vrioni I Government | 19 November 1920 | 1 July 1921 | 224 |
| 7th | Vrioni II Government | 11 July 1921 | 11 October 1921 | 92 |
| 8th | Sacred Union Government | 16 October 1921 | 6 December 1921 | 51 |
| 9th | Koculi Government | 6 December 1921 | 6 December 1921 | 0 (Note: The government stayed in office for only 20 hours, wherein the evening of the same day resigned.) |
| 10th | Prishtina Government | 7 December 1921 | 12 December 1921 | 5 |
| 11th | Kosturi Government | 12 December 1921 | 24 December 1921 | 12 |
| 12th | Ypi Government | 24 December 1921 | 2 December 1922 | 343 |
| 13th | Zogu I Government | 2 December 1922 | 25 February 1924 | 450 |
| 14th | Vërlaci I Government | 3 March 1924 | 27 May 1924 | 85 |
| 15th | Vrioni III Government | 30 May 1924 | 10 June 1924 | 11 |
| 16th | Noli Government | 16 June 1924 | 24 December 1924 | 191 |
| 17th | Zogu II Government | 6 January 1925 | 31 January 1925 | 25 |
| 18th | Zogu III Government | 1 February 1925 | 23 September 1925 | 234 |
| 19th | Zogu IV Government | 28 September 1925 | 10 February 1927 | 500 |
| 20th | Zogu V Government | 12 February 1927 | 20 October 1927 | 250 |
| 21st | Zogu VI Government | 24 October 1927 | 10 May 1928 | 199 |
| 22nd | Zogu VII Government | 11 May 1928 | 1 September 1928 | 113 |
| 23rd | Kotta I Government | 5 September 1928 | 5 March 1930 | 546 |
| 24th | Evangjeli II Government | 6 March 1930 | 11 April 1931 | 401 |
| 25th | Evangjeli III Government | 20 April 1931 | 7 December 1932 | 597 |
| 26th | Evangjeli IV Government | 11 January 1933 | 16 October 1935 | 1008 |
| 27th | Frashëri Government | 21 October 1935 | 7 November 1936 | 383 |
| 28th | Kotta II Government | 9 November 1936 | 7 April 1939 | 879 |
| – | Interim Administrative Committee | 8 April 1939 | 12 April 1939 | 4 |
| 29th | Vërlaci II Government | 12 April 1939 | 3 December 1941 | 966 |
| 30th | Merlika-Kruja Government | 3 December 1941 | 4 January 1943 | 397 |
| 31st | Libohova I Government | 18 January 1943 | 11 February 1943 | 24 |
| 32nd | Bushati Government | 12 February 1943 | 28 April 1943 | 75 |
| 33rd | Libohova II Government | 11 May 1943 | 12 September 1943 | 124 |
| – | Interim Executive Committee | 14 September 1943 | 4 November 1943 | 51 |
| 34th | Mitrovica Government | 5 November 1943 | 16 June 1944 | 224 |
| 35th | Dine Government | 18 July 1944 | 28 August 1944 | 41 |
| 36th | Biçaku Government | 6 September 1944 | 25 October 1944 | 49 |
| 37th | Democratic Government of Albania (Note: The quisling Biçaku Government served until October 25, 1944, while the first Hoxha Government, otherwise known as the "Democratic Government of Albania" (a precursor of the Anti-Fascist National Liberation Council) which was a provisional shadow government, started its term two days prior, on October 23.) | 23 October 1944 | 21 March 1946 | 514 |
| 38th | Hoxha II Government | 22 March 1946 | 4 July 1950 | 1565 |
| 39th | Hoxha III Government | 5 July 1950 | 19 July 1954 | 1475 |
| 40th | Shehu I Government | 20 July 1954 | 21 June 1958 | 1432 |
| 41st | Shehu II Government | 22 June 1958 | 16 July 1962 | 1485 |
| 42nd | Shehu III Government | 17 July 1962 | 13 September 1966 | 1519 |
| 43rd | Shehu IV Government | 14 September 1966 | 18 November 1970 | 1526 |
| 44th | Shehu V Government | 19 November 1970 | 28 October 1974 | 1439 |
| 45th | Shehu VI Government | 28 October 1974 | 26 December 1978 | 1520 |
| 46th | Shehu VII Government | 27 December 1978 | 18 December 1981 | 1087 |
| 47th | Çarçani I Government | 15 January 1982 | 23 November 1982 | 312 |
| 48th | Çarçani II Government | 23 November 1982 | 19 February 1987 | 1549 |
| 49th | Çarçani III Government | 20 February 1987 | 21 February 1991 | 1462 |
| 50th | Nano I Government | 22 February 1991 | 11 May 1991 | 78 |
| 51st | Nano II Government | 11 May 1991 | 12 June 1991 | 32 |
| 52nd | Government of Stability | 12 June 1991 | 6 December 1991 | 177 |
| 53rd | Technical Government | 18 December 1991 | 13 April 1992 | 117 |
| 54th | Meksi I Government | 13 April 1992 | 10 July 1996 | 1549 |
| 55th | Meksi II Government | 11 July 1996 | 1 March 1997 | 233 |
| 56th | Government of National Reconciliation | 12 March 1997 | 24 July 1997 | 134 |
| 57th | Nano III Government | 25 July 1997 | 28 September 1998 | 65 |
| 58th | Majko I Government | 2 October 1998 | 25 October 1999 | 392 |
| 59th | Meta I Government | 28 October 1999 | 6 September 2001 | 679 |
| 60th | Meta II Government | 6 September 2001 | 29 January 2002 | 145 |
| 61st | Majko II Government | 22 February 2002 | 25 July 2002 | 153 |
| 62nd | Nano IV Government | 29 July 2002 | 10 September 2005 | 1139 |
| 63rd | Berisha I Government | 11 September 2005 | 17 September 2009 | 1467 |
| 64th | Berisha II Government | 17 September 2009 | 15 September 2013 | 1459 |
| 65th | Rama I Government | 17 September 2013 | 13 September 2017 | 1457 |
| 66th | Rama II Government | 13 September 2017 | 18 September 2021 | 1466 |
| 67th | Rama III Government | 18 September 2021 | 12 September 2025 | 1456 |
| 68th | Rama IV Government | 12 September 2025 | Incumbent | 406 |

== See also ==
- Politics of Albania
- Prime Minister of Albania
