= Isuf Dibra =

Albanian politician

4th War Minister of Albania
- In office 5 October 1914 – 27 January 1916
- Preceded by: Kara Seit Pasha
- Succeeded by: Ali Riza Kolonja

Member of the Constitutional Assembly
- In office 18 December 1926 – 19 March 1927

Personal details
- Born: Unknown Dohoshisht, Ottoman Albania
- Died: 19 March 1927 Tirana, Albania

Isuf Dibra (Dohoshisht ? – Tirana, March 19, 1927) was an Albanian politician who served as Minister of War in the Toptani Government.

== Biography ==
Isuf Dibra was born in the village of Dohoshisht, present day Dibër County. Little information is known about his life, including the exact year of his birth. He attended the elementary ruşdiye school in Manastir. As the leader of a guerrilla force of roughly 5,000 mercenaries, he helped Essad Toptani seize power in the fall of 1914. For his efforts, in the form of gratitude, Essad Pasha named him Minister of War in his newly formed cabinet. Dibra was appointed as an unelected member of the senate in the Constitutional Assembly on 18 December 1926, replacing the ousted senator Eqrem Vlora who had not participated in the works of the senate for two months. The following year, on March 19, 1927, he was murdered in Tirana by his assistant under unknown circumstances. The printed press at the time reported that Dibra received a state funeral on March 22 and the procession speech was given by fellow senator Pilo Papa.
