= Ministry of People's Defence =

The Ministry of People's Defence may refer to:

- Ministry of People's Defence (Bulgaria)
- Ministry of People's Defence (Albania)
