= Xhavid Leskoviku =

Albanian diplomat (1882–1954)

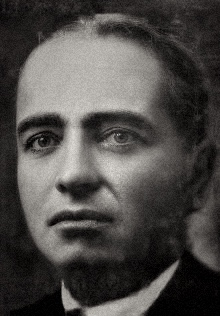
- Leskoviku in 1921

3rd Chief of the General Staff of the Albanian Armed Forces
- In office December 1921 – June 1923
- Preceded by: Ali Riza Kolonja
- Succeeded by: Bajram Fevziu

Personal details
- Born: 2 May 1882 Leskovik, Ottoman Albania
- Died: 1954 (aged 71–72) Burrel, People's Republic of Albania

Xhavid Leskoviku (2 May 1882 – 1954) was an Albanian army officer, political activist and diplomat who served as the 3rd Chief of the General Staff of the Albanian Armed Forces.

== Biography ==
Xhavid Leskoviku was born on 2 May 1882, in Leskovik. He studied at the War Academy in Istanbul, infantry branch, and became an officer on August 1, 1907. He served for six years in the Ottoman Army in several positions. On January 1, 1913, he entered the services of the Albanian National Army (UKSH). He served in the provisional government of Ismail Qemali as well as in the army of prince Wilhelm of Wied. Being a broad-minded military officer, he was assigned to the Dutch military contingent and helped to uncover the plot of the Young Turks in the military court of Vlorë. In November 1919, Leskoviku joined the political organization "National Wing" (Albanian: Krahu Kombëtar) and took part in the defence of the Congress of Lushnjë in January 1920. With the consolidation of the army at the end of this period, he was appointed Chief of the General Staff with Ali Riza Kolonja taking on the duties of the Minister of War. In 1924, he was sent as a military attaché to Belgrade, later ambassador to Skopje and finally to Ankara. In 1939 and 1940, he served as a member of the Constituent Assembly, representing the prefecture of Korçë. He participated in the assembly gathering of April 12, 1939, that abolished the constitution, thus overthrowing the Zog Dynasty that had ruled the country for the past eleven years.

After the war, Leskoviku was abducted in Thessaloniki by communist agents and transferred to Tirana where he was brought before a commission of inquiry consisting of Simo Zhupa, Kudret Hoxha and Andrea Jakubini in the trial of 1945, where he was accused and convicted of collaborating with the quisling government. He died at Burrel Prison in 1954, aged 71 or 72.
