= Bajram Fevziu =

Albanian army officer

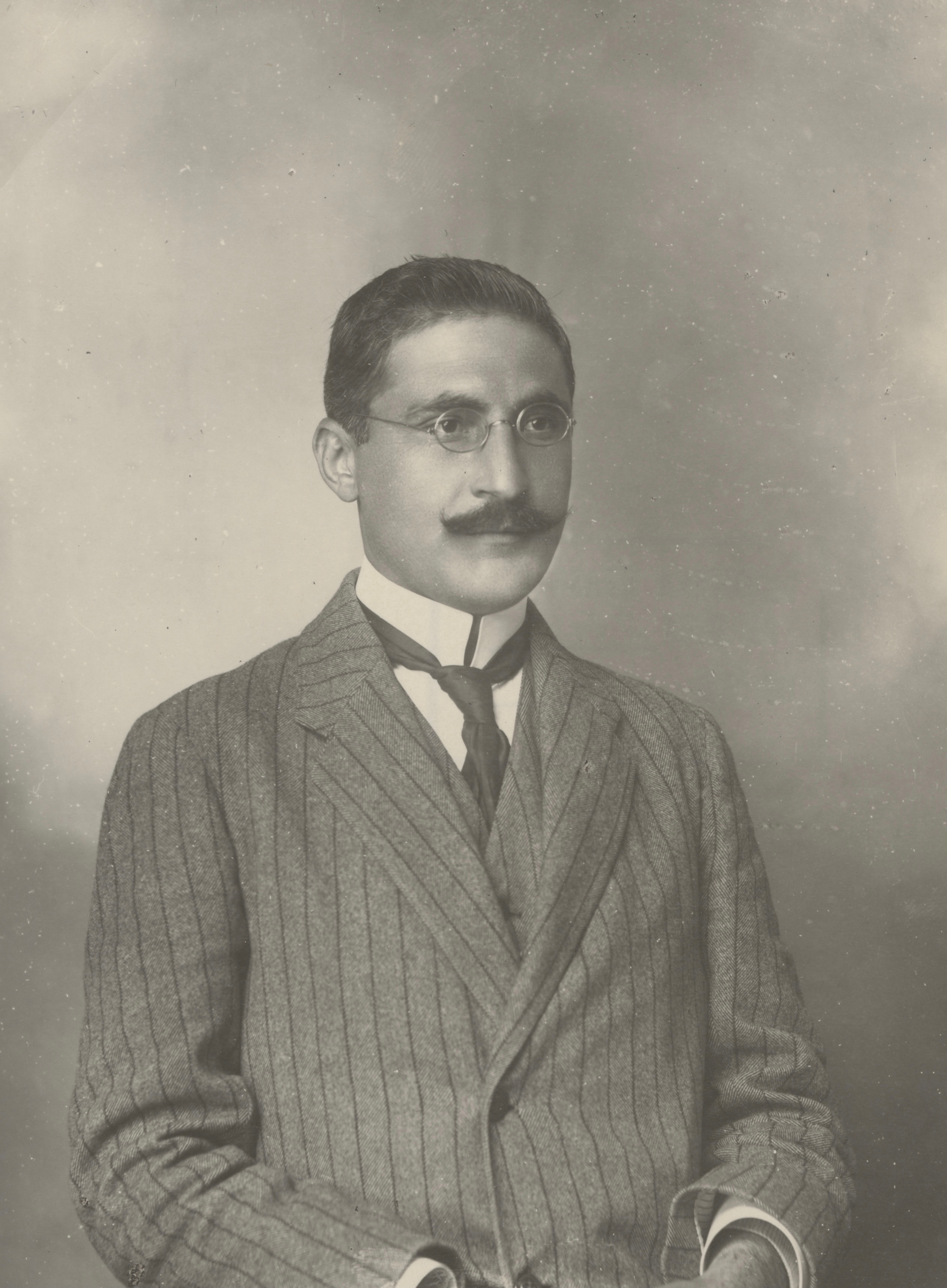

13th Interior Minister of Albania
- In office 18 October 1921 – 5 December 1921
- Preceded by: Sulejman Delvina
- Succeeded by: Luigj Gurakuqi

4th Chief of the General Staff of the Albanian Armed Forces
- In office August 1923 – 24 December 1924
- Preceded by: Xhavid Leskoviku
- Succeeded by: Gustav von Myrdacz

Personal details
- Born: 1884 Vodenë, Kolonjë, Ottoman Albania
- Died: 1928 (aged 43–44) Vienna, Austria
- Relations: Refik Toptani (father in law); Blendi Fevziu (grandson)

Bajram Fevziu (1884–1928) was an Albanian army officer and politician who served as the 4th Chief of the General Staff of the Albanian Armed Forces and as Minister of Internal Affairs in the Sacred Union Government of Pandeli Evangjeli.

== Biography ==
Bajram Fevziu was born in March 1884 in Vodenë, present day Kolonjë, then part of the Ottoman Empire. He finished his high school education in Thessaloniki (also at the time in the Ottoman Empire) and in 1906, graduated from the Higher Military Academy in Istanbul. In 1908, he completed his two-year studies in Vienna and was sent to the military Staff College in Paris where he remained for another two years. He returned to Albania in 1914 and joined the "National Wing" (Albanian: Krahu Kombëtar) organization. In 1919 he served as deputy prefect of Peqin. On March 18, 1920, Fevziu became an advisor to then mayor of Shkodër, Musa Juka. On November 14, 1920, he was named deputy prefect in Korçë. In 1921 he was appointed Minister of Internal Affairs in the Sacred Union Government of Pandeli Evangjeli. During the period from 1921 until 1923 he served as deputy representing the Popular Party in the National Council. In 1922 he was named prefect of Vlorë. From 1922 to 1923, he served as chairman of the Albanian military commission at the International Borders Commission for the delimitation of Albania's borders. From August 1923 to December 1924, Fevziu served as Chief of the General Staff of the Army. In 1928 he became severely ill and was sent to a hospital in Vienna for treatment, where he eventually died.
