= Ali Riza Kolonja =

Albanian politician (1880–1930)

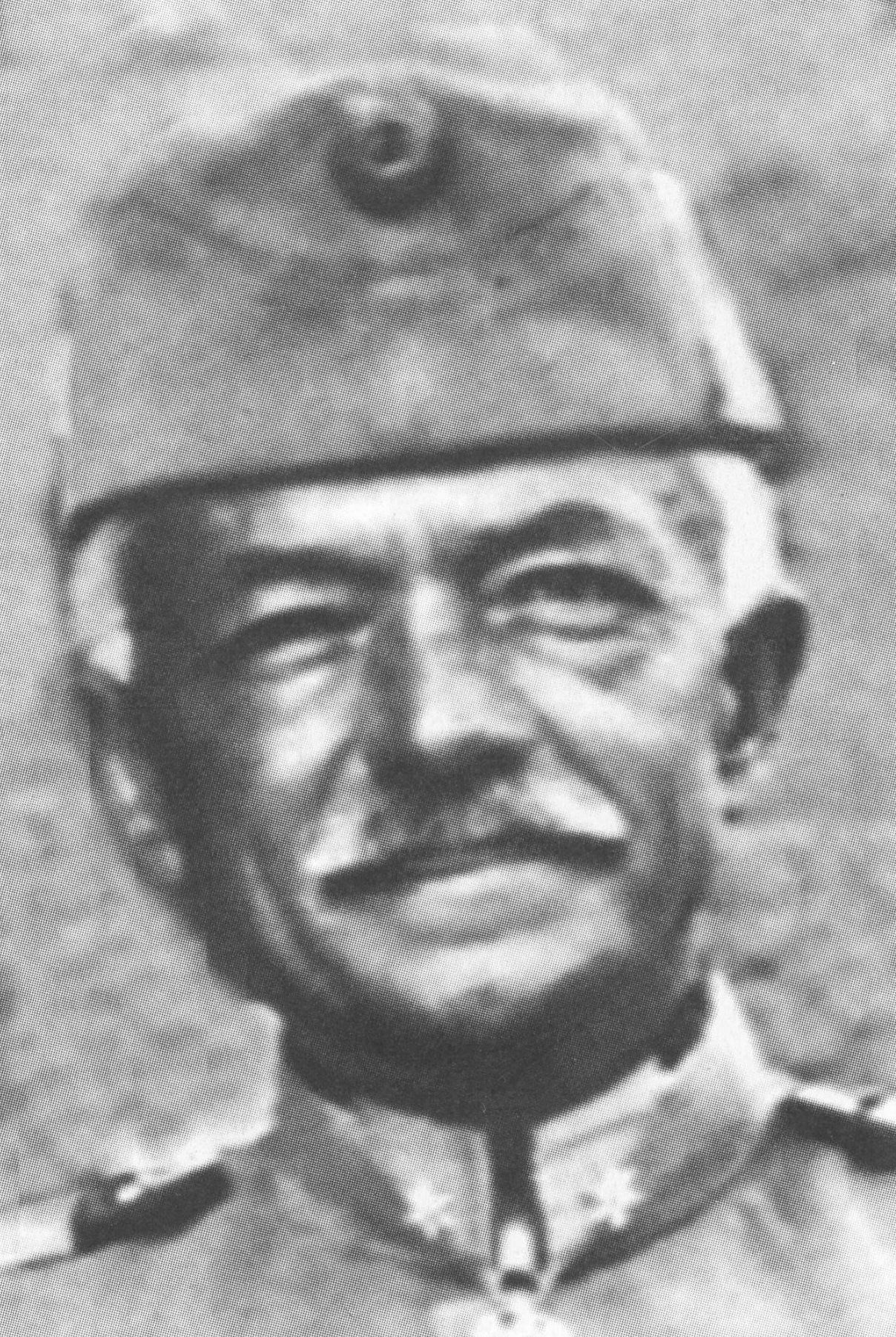

5th War Minister of Albania
- In office 30 January 1920 – 4 November 1920
- Preceded by: Isuf Dibra
- Succeeded by: Selahudin Shkoza

2nd Chief of the General Staff of the Albanian Armed Forces
- In office November 1920 – December 1921
- Preceded by: Ali Shefqet Shkupi
- Succeeded by: Xhavid Leskoviku

Personal details
- Born: 1880 Kolonjë, Ottoman Albania
- Died: 1930 (aged 49–50)

Ali Riza Kolonja (1880–1930) was an Albanian army general, diplomat and politician who served as Minister of War in the Delvina Government.

== Biography ==
Ali Riza Kolonja was born on 1880 in the region of Kolonjë, present day south-eastern Albania, then part of the Ottoman Empire. He graduated from the military gymnasium of Manastir and then attended two military academies in Istanbul. Later he enrolled at the Staff College in Berlin and subsequently became an officer in the Turkish Army where he would rise to the rank of general. In the fall of 1912, he served as division commander in the Balkan Wars that Turkey had waged in the Balkans against the Serbs to the north and the Greeks to the south.

At the conclusion of the wars, Kolonja responded to an invitation by Ismail Qemali to join a group of soldiers and army officers of Albanian origin that were led by Mehmet Pashë Deralla. He played a significant role in the organization of the new Albanian Army that was established by the provisional government.

A few years later, as a senior military officer, he gained distinction within the ranks of the Albanian units that were included in the Armée d'Orient led by general Henri Descoigns, during the existence of the Autonomous Province of Korçë (1916–1918). In 1920, he was appointed Minister of War in the Delvina Cabinet which formed after the Congress of Lushnjë and concurrently held the title Chief of the General Staff until December 1921. Throughout this period, he carried out large military operations to suppress the Mirdita Uprising and along with Italian general Enrico Tellini, represented the Albanian side in talks with the Border Commission from 1922–1923.

From 1922 until 1924, he served as Albanian minister to Belgrade and as non-resident minister to Prague (1924). He died in 1930.

== Recognition ==
In December 2009, the President of the Republic, Bamir Topi, awarded general Ali Riza Kolonja the medal "For Outstanding Services", with the motivation: "For outstanding merits in the re-establishment of the Albanian Armed Forces and for the protection of state borders". A street in Tirana bears his name.
