= Sabit Brokaj =

Albanian politician (1942–2020)

Albanian Minister of Defence
- In office 25 July 1997 – 24 April 1998
- President: Rexhep Meidani
- Prime Minister: Fatos Nano

Albanian Minister of Health
- In office February 1991 – December 1991
- President: Ramiz Alia
- Prime Minister: Fatos Nano; Ylli Bufi

Personal details
- Born: January 7, 1942 Vlorë, Albanian Kingdom (present day Republic of Albania)
- Died: September 13, 2020 (aged 78)
- Cause of death: Heart attack by Blood
- Party: Socialist Party of Albania (from 12 June 1991)
- Other political affiliations: Party of Labour of Albania (until 12 June 1991)
- Education: University of Tirana
- Profession: Doctor

Sabit Brokaj (7 January 1942 – 13 September 2020) was an Albanian politician, doctor, and professor. In 1991 Brokaj served as the Minister of Health of Albania.

== Early life ==
Brokaj was born 7 January 1942, in Vlorë, Albania during the Italian occupation of Albania. From 1959 to 1964, Brokaj served as a medical assistant on a submarine. After graduating from the University of Tirana's medical faculty in 1969, Brokaj went on to serve as medical chief of a brigade in Shijak from 1969 to 1972. From 1972 to 1984, Brokaj worked as a cardiologist at military hospital in Tirana. He traveled to France to study cardiology in 1979 and echocardiology in 1982. During this period, Brokaj was one of Enver Hoxha's personal physicians.

In 1984, Brokaj left the military to become a professor at a medical school in Tirana. He was promoted to Deputy Dean of the school in 1987, and Dean in 1989. He held this position until he left the school in 1991.

During his medical career, Brokaj was a rival of fellow cardiologist Sali Berisha. Berisha would go on to be President and Prime Minister of Albania as a member of the conservative Democratic Party of Albania. Their rivalry continued during their political careers, to the point that reports stated they were not on speaking terms.

== Political career ==
Brokaj entered into Albanian politics following the fall of communism in Albania, and was seen as a member of the Socialist Party's "old guard". He first served as Minister of Health from February to December 1991. He was elected Deputy of the People's Assembly in 1991, 1996, and 1997. In 1992 he was elected to the presidency of the Socialist Party of Albania. On 25 July 1997, Brokaj was appointed Minister of Defence. His leadership as Defence Minister was seen as lacking, especially because it took place following the 1997 unrest in Albania. The damage to military assets at the time was extensive, and many pieces of military equipment were stolen by rioters. These stolen assets even included Chinese-made HY-1 surface-to-air missiles. To help rebuild the Albanian military following the unrest, Brokaj turned to Turkey and Greece.

== Personal life ==
Brokaj was fluent in English, French, Russian, and Italian. He was married with two children.

He died on 13 September 2020, aged 78.
