= Gramoz Pashko =

Albanian economist and politician

Deputy Prime Minister of Albania
- In office 11 June 1991 – 18 December 1991
- Preceded by: Shkëlqim Cani
- Succeeded by: Zyhdi Pepa

Minister of Economy
- In office 11 June 1991 – 18 December 1991
- Prime Minister: Ylli Bufi
- Preceded by: Leontiev Çuçi
- Succeeded by: Gjergj Konda

Member of Albanian parliament
- In office 1991–1995

Personal details
- Born: 11 February 1955 Tirana, Albania
- Died: 16 July 2006 (aged 51) Adriatic Sea, within Albania and Italy
- Party: Democratic Party
- Other political affiliations: Democratic Alliance Party
- Domestic partner: Mimoza Ruli
- Children: 2 (one passed away)
- Education: University of Tirana
- Profession: Economist
- Gramoz Pashko's voice Pashko on international economic aid to Albania; Recorded 17 September 1991

Gramoz Pashko (11 February 1955 – 16 July 2006) was an Albanian economist and politician. He co-founded the Democratic Party of Albania in 1990 and later served as rector of the University of New York, Tirana. Pashko was married to Mimoza Ruli, sister of politician Genc Ruli.

== Early life and education ==
Gramoz Pashko was the son of Josif Pashko. He was a graduate of the University of Tirana. He received a bachelor's degree in 1977, a master's degree in 1983 and a PhD in 1989, all in economics.

== Career ==
Pashko was the cofounder of the Democratic Party that was established in 1990. In 1991, he served as the deputy prime minister and minister of economy in the cabinet led by the then prime minister Ylli Bufi. A few months later, he quit the positions and the Democratic Party membership to form the Democratic Alliance Party. Gramoz Pashko decided to rejoin the Democratic Party, undergoing a vote on the structures of the latter. At the last congress of the Democratic Party, Pashko was elected a member of the National Council of the Democratic Party. Pashko also served as economic advisor to several left wing prime ministers.

== Death ==
Pashko hit his head on 16 July 2006 while diving in the sea in Himarë, southern Albania. The Bell 222 helicopter transporting him to Bari, Italy, for medical treatment crashed over the Adriatic Sea. Six people died in the crash: the two pilots, an engineer, a doctor; Pashko and his son Ruben, who was traveling with him.
