= Xhemal Bushati =

Albanian politician (1880–1941)

Xhemal Shaqir Bushati
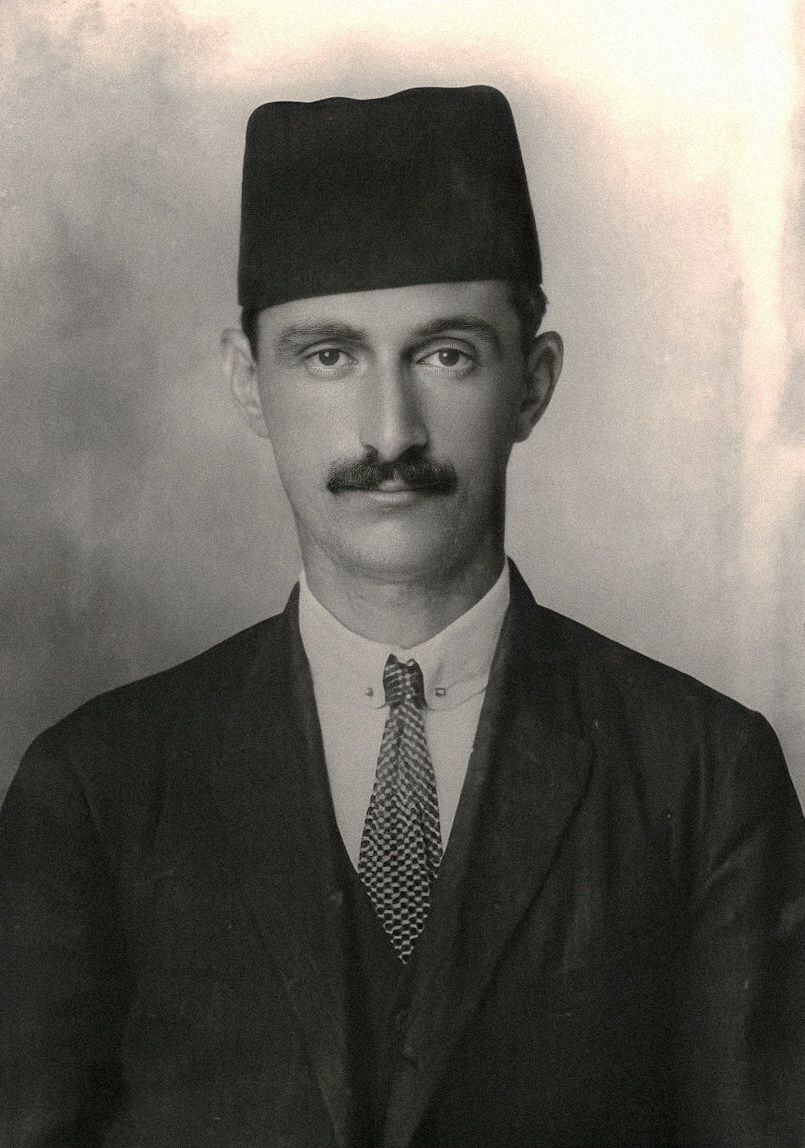
- Born: 1880; Shkodër, Scutari Vilayet, Ottoman Empire
- Died: 1 August 1941; Shkodër, Albania
- Known for: "Bashkimi Kombëtar" organization Albanian opposition 1921-1924

Xhemal Bushati (1880–1941) was an Albanian politician of the twentieth century.

== Life ==
Xhemal Bushati was born Xhemal Shaqir Bushati in Shkodër, member of the Bushati family which ruled the Scutari Vilayet during the Ottoman Empire. He participated in two wars against the Montenegrin in Shkodër, during 1912–1913 and in 1920.

His first appearance as a politician was in 1913–1914 as an opponent of "Sejadi Milet" organization, a pro-Turkish anti-Independence movement powerful in Shkodra at that time. He was also an opponent of Essad Pasha and his pro-Serbian orientation. On 26 July 1916, the armies of Kingdom of Serbs, Croats and Slovenes without any warning attacked Shkodra area from the Montenegrin border side (Hani i Hotit). Bushati was elected as one of the civic resistance groups, operating in the area of Vraka.

He participated at the Albanian assembly held in Bushat as a representative of Shkodër in 1919. There he cooperated with other government, cleric and people's representatives in generating a memo which was sent to the Paris Peace Conference where they opposed further partition of Albanian territories.

Bushati was a delegate in the Congress of Lushnje. On 13 February 1920, two days after the new institutions were installed in Tirana (the new capital), the new parliament representatives Xhemal Bushati, Hilë Mosi, Ndoc Çoba, and Sabri Bushati represented a declaration in the name of Shkodra's population which unconditionally approved all the decision coming out of Lushnja's Congress. Bushati was elected member of the Albanian Parliament after the 1921 elections as representative of his home town. He cooperated closely with Luigj Gurakuqi as two main leaders of the Albanian parliamentary opposition of 1921-24 for the Prefecture of Shkodra. Of thirteen representatives, twelve belonged to the opposition. In 1923 he was elected Assemblyman and again Representative. In March 1923 he protested inside the parliament against the oppression and persecution that followed a revolt in Korçë.

A supporter of the June Revolution, he was part of the Fan Noli's government as a Minister without Portfolio, representing the moderate-conservative branch of the Albanian politics together with Sulejman Delvina and Rexhep Shala. After the return of Ahmet Zogu in power he left the country and was initially stationed in Bari. After the assassination of Luigj Gurakuqi (still collaborating with him), Bushati left for Paris and after a few months in Vienna, Austria stationed later in Sarajevo. Bushati was a core member of the "Bashkimi Kombëtar" (The National Union) anti-Zogist organization together with Sotir Peci, Sejfi Vllamasi, Angjelin Suma, and Ali Klissura founded in 1925 in Vienna. The organization members were financially supported by Yugoslavia.

Bushati returned in Albania after the Italian Invasion but did not accept any governmental position. He died unexpectedly in August 1941.

During the Communist Era his name was annihilated, and was restored after. In 1993, he was given the posthumous award "Pishtar i Demokracisë" (Beacon of Democracy) by President Sali Berisha.

== See also ==
- Maliq Bushati
- Pashalik of Shkodra
