= Kara Seit Pasha =

Kara Seit Pasha was an Ottoman military officer who served as Minister of War in the Përmeti II Government, better known as the Durrës Government.

== Biography ==
Few records are available today in reference to Seit Pasha's life. He is thought to have had a long military career serving in the Ottoman Empire. During the early days of Albania's Independence movement, he served as division commander in Thessaloniki and in areas of the territory that would later become Southern Albania. Seit Pasha joined the cabinet of Turhan Pasha Përmeti in August 1914 and served briefly until September 3. Later that year he transferred to Shkodër. His name is mentioned as a candidate for minister in the events that preceded the National Congress of Elbasan in 1916.
