= Vërlaci II Government =

Government of Albania during the early Italian occupation (1939)

- 29th Government of Albania
- April–December 1939
- Date formed: 12 April 1939
- Date dissolved: 3 December 1939

People and organisations
- King: Victor Emmanuel III (as King of Albania)
- Prime Minister: Shefqet Vërlaci
- No. of ministers: 8

History
- Predecessor: Interim Administrative Committee
- Successor: Merlika-Kruja Government

The Vërlaci II Government (Albanian: Qeveria e dytë e Shefqet Vërlacit) was the 29th ruling government of Albania, in office from 12 April 1939 to 3 December 1939. It was formed immediately following the Italian invasion of Albania and marked the establishment of a collaborationist administration under Italian control.

The government was headed by Shefqet Vërlaci, who concurrently served as Prime Minister and acting Secretary of State for Public Works. Under this cabinet, Albania was formally transformed into a personal union with the Kingdom of Italy, with Victor Emmanuel III of Italy proclaimed King of Albania. Executive authority was significantly constrained by the Italian authorities, and key policies were aligned with the interests of the Italian Fascist regime.

The Vërlaci II Government introduced institutional changes aimed at integrating Albania into the Italian political and economic system, including the establishment of the Albanian Fascist Party. Growing dissatisfaction, administrative inefficiency, and Italian pressure led to Vërlaci's resignation in December 1939, after which a new government was formed under senator Mustafa Merlika-Kruja.

== Cabinet ==
Vërlaci II Government
Shefqet Vërlaci – Prime Minister; acting Secretary of State for Public Works
Xhaferr Ypi – Secretary of State for Justice
Maliq Bushati – Secretary of State for Internal Affairs
Xhemil Dino – Minister of Foreign Affairs
Fejzi Alizoti / Qemal Vrioni – Secretary of State for Finance
Andon Beça – Secretary of State for National Economy
Ernest Koliqi – Secretary of State for Education
Tefik Mborja – Secretary of the Albanian Fascist Party

== See also ==
- Politics of Albania
- Italian invasion of Albania
- Italian occupation of Albania
- Shefqet Vërlaci
- Albanian Fascist Party
