= Dohoshisht =

- Village
- Location within Albania
- Coordinates: 41°40′N 20°25′E
- Country: Albania
- County: Dibër
- Municipality: Dibër
- Administrative unit: Tomin

Population
  - Administrative unit: 2,000
- Time zone: UTC+1 (CET)
  - Summer (DST): UTC+2 (CEST)

Dohoshisht is a village in Dibër County, northeastern Albania. It is located 1 km southwest of the town of Peshkopi, and is bisected by the Hot Springs Creek (Albanian: Përroi i Llixhave). In the 2015 local government reform it became a subdivision of the municipality of Dibër.

The vast majority of residents are ethnic Albanians, with a small minority of Jevgs. Islam is the dominant religious identity.

== History ==
Dohoshisht is considered one of the oldest villages in the area. In the Ottoman period, the village was governed by beys and by families which were wealthy and renowned throughout the area. One of them was the Hysenagolli family, holders of the title of Oxhakllëk ("hearthship"), which represented primacy and leadership of the entire Dibër region. The family's descendants are now dispersed widely to places such as Peshkopi, Tirana, Macedonia and the USA. In the modern day, other families, such as the Truka family from the Venisht village (who were settlers and grandsons of the oxhak), have attempted to appropriate the Hysenagolli surname.

Other well-known families in Dohoshisht include the Alku, Kaja, and Kadriu.
