= Pirro Vengu =

Albanian politician

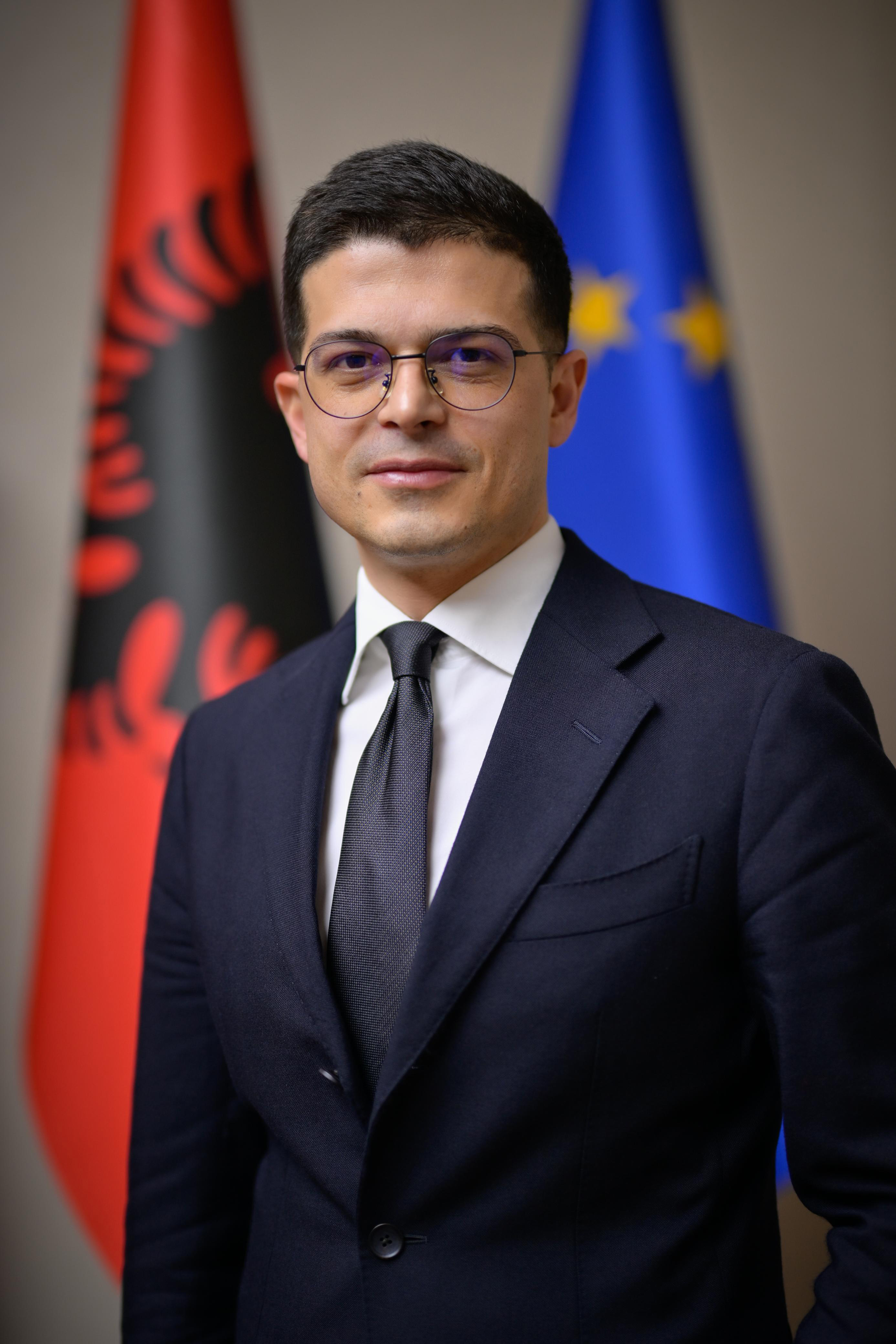
- Official portrait, 2025

36th Defence Minister of Albania
- In office 30 July 2024 – 26 February 2026
- President: Bajram Begaj
- Prime Minister: Edi Rama
- Preceded by: Niko Peleshi
- Succeeded by: Ermal Nufi

Member of Parliament
- Incumbent
- Assumed office 12 September 2025
- Constituency: Vlorë County

Personal details
- Born: 24 April 1986 (age 40) Elbasan, Albania
- Education: Lycée Henri IV

Pirro Vengu (born 24 April 1986) is an Albanian politician who served as Minister of Defense of Albania from July 2024 to February 2026.

== Education ==
He studied Human Sciences at Lycée Henri-IV, Paris graduating in 2008. He earned two bachelor's degrees in History and Philosophy from Université Paris Nanterre, Paris, France and a master's degree in Political History at the same university in 2010. Vengu studied for a master's degree in International Relations at Institut national des langues et civilisations orientales, Paris, graduating in 2011.

== Career ==
From 2009 to 2013, Vengu worked at the European Council on Foreign Relations in Paris, first as a Programme Assistant and then as Research Programme Coordinator. He then returned to Albania and served as Head of the Cabinet at the Ministry of Foreign Affairs until 2017. He was Director of Anticorruption at the Prime Minister’s Office from 2017 to 2019, and then Director General of the Durrës Port Authority until his current position.

Vengu is married with two children.
