= Perikli Teta =

20th Defence Minister of Albania
- In office 22 February 1991 – 10 May 1991
- Preceded by: Ndriçim Karakaçi
- Succeeded by: Alfred Moisiu

49th Minister of Public Order of Albania
- In office 24 April 1998 – 29 September 1998
- Preceded by: Neritan Ceka
- Succeeded by: Petro Koçi

Personal details
- Born: August 11, 1941 Saint-Étienne, France
- Died: January 23, 2007 (aged 65) Ioannina, Greece
- Party: Democratic Party of Albania

Perikli Teta (1941–2007) was an Albanian aircraft engineer and politician who held several ministerial posts in Albania during the tumultuous decade of the 1990s.

== Early life and education ==
Teta was born on August 11, 1941, in Saint-Étienne, France by parents originating from Përmet. He completed his primary education at the 7-year-old school "Ylli i Kuq" in Tirana's suburb of Laprakë. Later he attended the Polytechnic University "7 Nëntori", branching in mechanical engineering. From 1959–1961, he studied aircraft engineering in the Soviet Union.

== Career ==
After briefly interrupting his studies, Teta returned to Albania and began employment as an aircraft technician at the Combat Aviation Regiment in Rinas. From 1968 to 1971 he resumed his studies and attended the Faculty of Mechanical Engineering at the University of Tirana. In 1974, he was appointed as Chief Military Aviation Engineer at the Ministry of Defence, a post he held until 1991.

In 1991, Teta was named Minister of Civil Defence, nominated by the Democratic Party as an independent. He would join the party the following year and was elected member of the parliament for a 4-year term. On 13 August 1992, after being expelled from all forums and the DP's parliamentary group, he went on to form his own political party "Aleanca Demokratike". From 1997–1998, Teta served as Secretary of State for Defence Policy at the Ministry of Defence and was later appointed as Minister of Public Order. He died at a hospital in Ioannina, Greece on January 23, 2007.
