= Merlika-Kruja Government =

Government of Albania during the Italian occupation (1941–1943)

- 30th Government of Albania
- December 1941 – January 1943
- Date formed: 3 December 1941
- Date dissolved: 4 January 1943

People and organisations
- King: Victor Emmanuel III (as King of Albania)
- Prime Minister: Mustafa Merlika-Kruja
- No. of ministers: 9

History
- Predecessor: Vërlaci II Government
- Successor: Libohova I Government

The Merlika-Kruja Government (Albanian: Qeveria e Mustafa Krujës) was the 30th ruling government of Albania, in office from 3 December 1941 to 4 January 1943, during the period of the Italian occupation of Albania in World War II. It was headed by Mustafa Merlika-Kruja, who concurrently served as Prime Minister and acting Secretary of State for Internal Affairs.

This government represented one of the most ideologically aligned collaborationist administrations with the Italian Fascist regime. Its policies emphasized strong anti-communism, administrative centralization, and close cooperation with Italian authorities. During its tenure, Albania included territories annexed during the war including part of Kosovo, often referred to as the “Liberated Lands” (Albanian: Tokat e Lirueme), which were administered through a dedicated ministry.

The Merlika-Kruja Government faced growing resistance from partisan forces and increasing instability as the war situation deteriorated for the Axis powers. Mounting internal opposition and Italian dissatisfaction led to Mustafa Kruja's resignation in early 1943, paving the way for a new cabinet under Libohova I Government.

== Cabinet ==
Merlika-Kruja Government
Mustafa Merlika-Kruja – Prime Minister; acting Secretary of State for Internal Affairs
Hasan Dosti – Secretary of State for Justice
Shuk Gurakuqi – Secretary of State for Finance
Xhevat Korça – Secretary of State for Education
Iljaz Agushi – Minister of Public Works
Fuat Dibra / Kostandin Kotte – Secretary of State for National Economy
Tahir Shtylla / Eqrem Vlora – Secretary of State for the Liberated Lands
Dhimitër Berati – Secretary of State for Popular Culture
Jup Kazazi – Secretary of State of the Albanian Fascist Party

== See also ==
- Politics of Albania
- Italian occupation of Albania
- World War II in Albania
- Mustafa Merlika-Kruja
- Albanian Fascist Party
