= Ermal Nufi =

Albanian politician

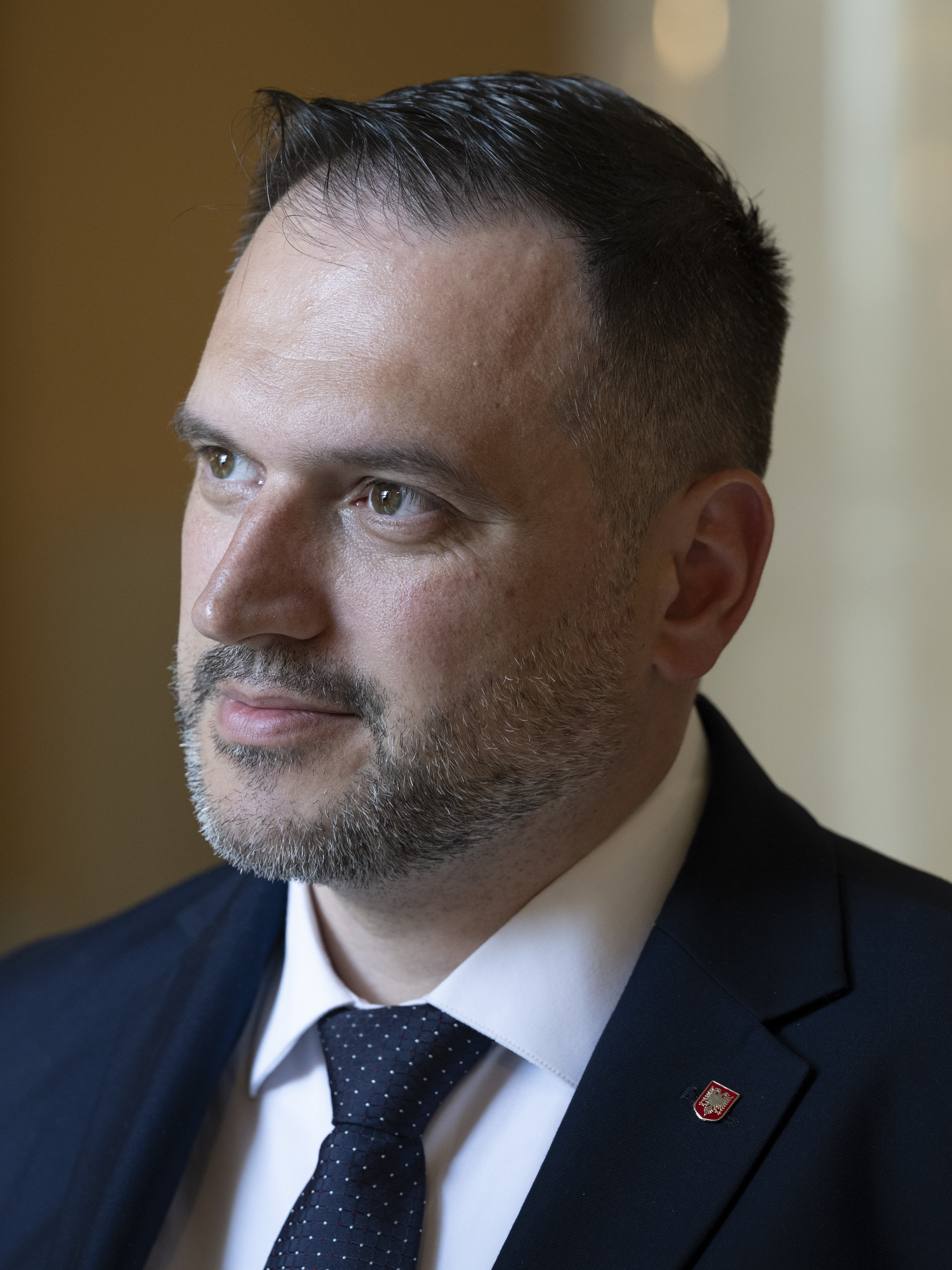

Minister of Defence
- Incumbent
- Assumed office 26 February 2026
- Prime Minister: Edi Rama
- Preceded by: Pirro Vengu

Personal details
- Party: Socialist Party of Albania
- Education: University of Tirana

Ermal Nufi is an Albanian politician serving as Minister of Defence of Albania since 2026. Until 2026, he served as chief of staff to Belinda Balluku.
