= Vilson Ahmeti =

Albanian politician (1951)

Prime Minister of Albania
- In office 10 December 1991 – 4 April 1992
- President: Ramiz Alia
- Preceded by: Ylli Bufi
- Succeeded by: Aleksandër Meksi

Personal details
- Born: 5 September 1951 (age 74) Fier, People's Socialist Republic, present Albania
- Party: Socialist Party of Albania

Vilson Ahmeti (born 5 September 1951) is an Albanian politician. He served as the Prime Minister of Albania between 10 December 1991 and 4 April 1992.

== Life and career ==
He was appointed as Prime Minister of Albania to the position by President Ramiz Alia on December 4, following the dismissal of seven ministers, the resignation of Ylli Bufi, and the dissolution of the previous government. He had previously served as a minister in the Socialist government. He served until 4 April 1992. On 31 August 1993, Ahmeti was sentenced to two years in prison on charges of abuse of power.
