= Government of Durrës =

4th ruling government of Albania

- 4th Government of Albania
- December 1918‒January 1920
- Date formed: 25 December 1918
- Date dissolved: 29 January 1920

People and organisations
- Prince: Wilhelm of Wied (de jure)
- Prime Minister: Turhan Pasha Përmeti
- No. of ministers: 8

History
- Predecessor: Toptani Government
- Successor: Delvina Government

The Government of Durrës (Albanian: Qeveria e Durrësit) was the 4th ruling government of Albania formed after the events at the Congress of Durrës from which it takes its name. The government was headed by Turhan Pashë Përmeti, for whom it was the second time in the position of prime minister.

The government was dismissed from office by the Congress of Lushnjë as pro-Italian and that had betrayed the interests of the Albanian people and state.

== Cabinet ==
Përmeti II Government
Turhan Pasha Përmeti – Prime Minister
Prenk Bib Doda – Deputy Prime Minister (assassinated on March 22, 1919)
Mufid Libohova – Deputy delegate of the Prime Minister
Fejzi Alizoti – Delegate of Finances
Mehdi Frashëri (Mufid Libohova served concurrently) – Delegate of Internal Affairs
Petro Poga – Delegate of Justice
Mustafa Merlika-Kruja – Delegate of Post-Telegraphs
Luigj Gurakuqi – Delegate of Education
Sami Vrioni – Delegate of Public Works, Agriculture, Trade
Mid'hat Frashëri – Delegate without portfolio
Luigj Bumçi – Delegate without portfolio
Mihal Turtulli – Delegate without portfolio
Mehmed Konica (Mehdi Frashëri served concurrently) – Delegate of Foreign Affairs
Lef Nosi – Delegate of the food for the people and for economic and social issues

== See also ==
- Politics of Albania
- Turhan Pashë Përmeti
