= International Control Commission (Albania) =

- 2nd Government of Albania
- 1914
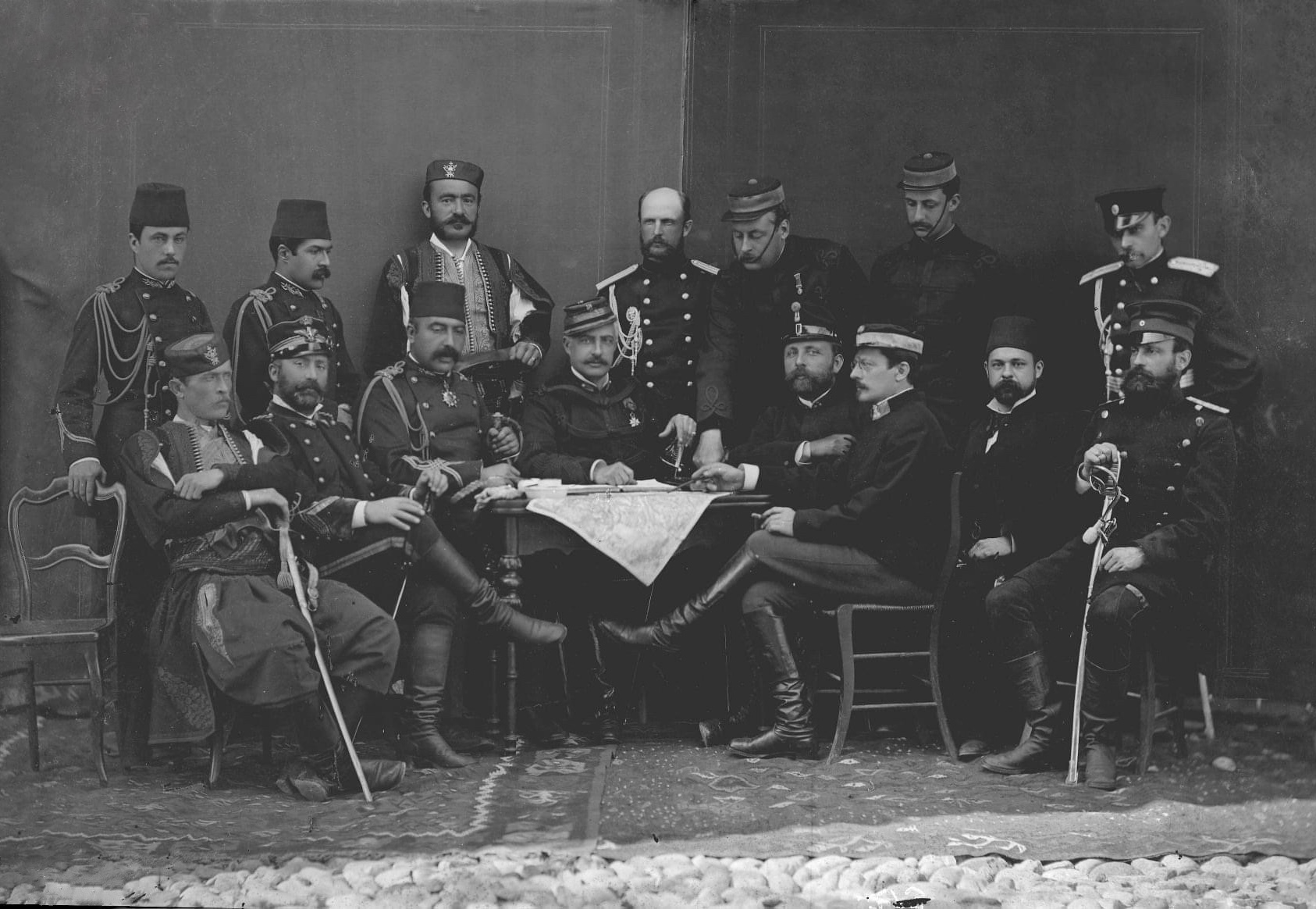
- Members of the International Control Commission
- Date formed: 15 October 1913
- Date dissolved: 17 March 1914

People and organisations
- Representatives: Léon-Alphonse-Thadée Krajewski; Harry Harling Lamb; Alessandro Leoni; Aleksandr Mihajlovič Petrjaev; Aristoteles Petrović; Julius Winckel; Mufid Libohova

History
- Election: Treaty of London
- Predecessor: Provisional Government
- Successor: Përmeti I Government

The International Commission of Control (Albanian: Komisioni Ndërkombëtar i Kontrollit të Kufinjve) was the commission established on October 15, 1913, on the basis of the decision by the six Great Powers made on July 29, 1913, according to the London Treaty signed on May 30, 1913. Its goal was to take care of the administration of newly established Albania until its own political institutions were in order.

== History ==
The Headquarters of the International Commission of Control (ICC) was in Vlorë. The Great Powers authorized the commission to assume the administration of the country.

A plot by the Young Turk government and led by Bekir Fikri to restore Ottoman control over Albania through the installment of an Ottoman-Albanian officer Ahmed Izzet Pasha as monarch was uncovered by the Serbs and reported to the ICC. Ismail Qemali supported the plot for military assistance against Serbia and Greece. The ICC allowed their Dutch officers serving as the Albanian Gendarmerie to declare a state of emergency and stop the plot. They raided Vlorë on 7–8 January 1914, discovering more than 200 Ottoman troops and arrested Fikri. During Fikri's trial the plot emerged and an ICC military court under Colonel Willem de Veer condemned him to death and later commuted to life imprisonment, while Qemali and his cabinet resigned. After Qemali left the country, turmoil ensued throughout Albania.

== Members ==
The Great Powers established the Commission of Control composed of the representatives of each Great Power and one Albanian.

Members of the commission were:

- Léon-Alphonse-Thadée Krajewski (France)
- Harry Harling Lamb (United Kingdom)
- Alessandro Leoni (Italy)
- Aleksandr Mihajlovič Petrjaev (Russian: Александр Михайлович Петряев) (Russia)
- Aristoteles Petrović (Austria-Hungary)
- Julius Winckel (Germany)
- Mufid Libohova (Albania)

When Prince Wilhelm of Wied took control over the Principality of Albania in March 1914, the Albanian representative (Libohova) was replaced by Mehdi Frashëri on March 17, 1914. After that change, all the other members of the commission remained in their positions until September 9, 1914, except the representative of the Austria-Hungary who resigned his position before May 25, 1914.

== Administration ==
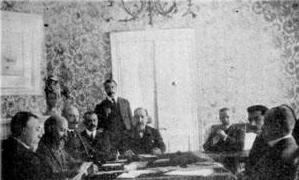
Picture of the negotiations that lead to the Protocol of Corfu between the International Commission of Control and Northern Epirote representatives.

After gradually assuming the administration of the country in 1914, the International Commission prepared a draft of the constitution (Albanian: Statuti Organik) with 216 articles. It would provide for establishment of the National Assembly with power of legislation in Albania which was designed as hereditary constitutional monarchy.

According to the constitution, the country would have, with few exceptions, the same administrative organization as during the Ottoman Empire suzerainty. It would be partitioned into seven administrative districts, each of them would choose three representatives for the national assembly by direct suffrage.

The prince would nominate ten representatives and the heads of all three religions (Islam, Orthodox and Catholic) would also be represented in the national assembly, which would have a four-year term. The Council of Ministers, with executive powers, would be appointed by the prince.

== Protocol of Corfu ==
On May 17, after the Greeks living in southern Albania declared the Autonomous Republic of Northern Epirus, the Commission intervened in order to avoid escalation of the conflicts. As a result, the Protocol of Corfu was signed, which recognized the autonomous status of Albania's southern provinces, which consisted of Northern Epirus. Moreover, the execution and maintenance of this agreement was entrusted to the Commission.

== End ==
With Albania in a state of civil war from July 1914 and the Great Powers at war with one another, the regime collapsed and Prince William left the country on 3 September 1914, originally to Venice. Despite leaving Albania, he did so insisting that he remained head of state. In his proclamation, he informed the people that "he deemed it necessary to absent himself temporarily". The prince handed over the government to the International Commission of Control, and only three days, it dispersed.
