= Zogu I Government =

First government of Ahmet Zogu (1922–1924)

- 6th Government of Albania
- December 1922 – February 1924
- Date formed: 2 December 1922
- Date dissolved: 25 February 1924

People and organisations
- Head of State: High Council of Regency
- Prime Minister: Ahmet Zogu
- No. of ministers: 7

History
- Predecessor: Ypi Government
- Successor: Vërlaci I Government

The Zogu I Government (Albanian: Qeveria e parë e Ahmet Zogut) was the sixth ruling government of Albania, in office from 2 December 1922 to 25 February 1924. It was headed by Ahmet Zogu, who concurrently served as Minister of Internal Affairs.

This government marked Ahmet Zogu's consolidation of political power during the early years of the Albanian state. Its primary objectives included restoring internal order, strengthening central authority, and stabilizing public administration after a prolonged period of political instability. Zogu relied on a pragmatic and authoritarian governing style, emphasizing security and institutional continuity over political liberalization.

The Zogu I Government faced strong opposition from reformist and democratic forces, particularly supporters of Fan Noli. Political tensions escalated throughout 1923 and early 1924, culminating in Zogu's resignation following the political crisis that preceded the June Revolution of 1924.

== Cabinet ==
Zogu I Government
Ahmet Zogu – Prime Minister and Minister of Internal Affairs
Pandeli Evangjeli – Minister of Foreign Affairs
Hysen Vrioni / Milto Tutulani – Minister of Justice
Kol Thaçi – Minister of Finance
Ismail Haki Tatzati / Mustafa Aranitasi – Minister of War
Spiro Jorgo Koleka / Sejfi Vllamasi – Minister of Public Works and Agriculture
Rexhep Mitrovica – Minister of Education

== See also ==
- Politics of Albania
- Ahmet Zogu
- June Revolution (Albania)
- Governments of Albania
