= Sulejman Delvina =

Albanian politician (1871–1932)

Sulejman Delvina Bey
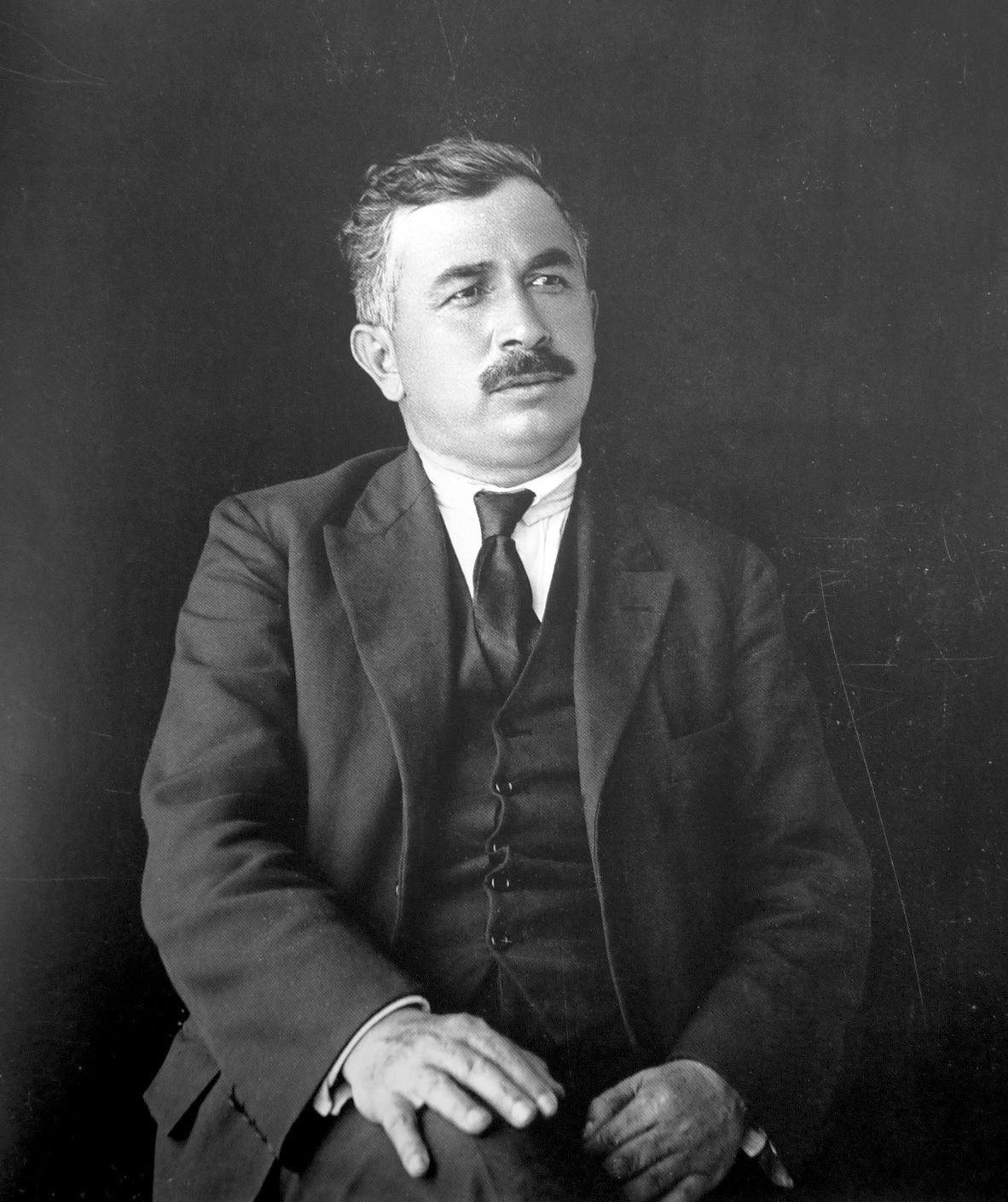

5th Prime Minister of Albania
- In office 30 January 1920 – 14 November 1920
- Monarch: Vilhelm I
- Deputy: Eshref Frashëri
- Preceded by: Turhan Përmeti
- Succeeded by: Ilias Vrioni

9th Minister of Internal Affairs
- In office 11 July 1921 – 16 October 1921
- Monarch: Vilhelm I
- Prime Minister: Ilias Vrioni
- Preceded by: Fuad Dibra
- Succeeded by: Bajram Fevziu

15th Minister of Foreign Affairs
- In office 16 June 1924 – 24 December 1924
- Monarch: Vilhelm I
- Prime Minister: Fan Noli
- Preceded by: Ilias Vrioni
- Succeeded by: Gjergj Koleci

Personal details
- Born: 5 October 1871 (Note: Robert Elsie in Historical Dictionary of Albania incorrectly sets the year of birth in 1884, while according to Elisabeth Özdalga he graduated in 1899 making it inaccurate, as it was only 15 years old at the time. Özdalga herself, sets the year of birth in 1872, which is much closer to 1871 which is widely used in Albanian sources.) Delvinë, Ottoman Empire, (today Albania)
- Died: 1 August 1932 (aged 60) Vlorë, Kingdom of Albania
- Parent: Selim Bay Delvina (father)
- Relatives: Namik Delvina
- Education: Mekteb-i Mülkiye
- Cabinet: Delvina Government
- Awards: Honor of the Nation

Sulejman Delvina, also known as Sylejman Fehmi (5 October 1871 – 1 August 1932), was an Albanian politician, who served as the fifth prime minister of Albania from 30 January to 14 November 1920.

== Life and career ==
=== Early life ===
Sulejman Delvina was born on 5 October 1871 in the city of the same name, Delvinë, then Ottoman Empire. His father Selim bey came from a family of high status in the area which is evidenced by the honorific title Bey that Sulejman himself, his father Selim and his brother Namik Delvina held. He studied in the rüşdiye (Middle school) at the Zosimaia School in Ioannina, while completed his university studies at the Mekteb-i Mülkiye for Public Administration in Istanbul, from where he graduated in the class of 1899. In the same year he began to serve as an officer in the Ottoman Ministry of Interior. In May 1901, he became a professor of Ottoman literature at Vefa Idadi school in Istanbul, and from September 1905 onwards he held the same post at the prestigious Galatasaray High School. In 1909, he wrote a manual, republished in 1910 and 1912, on Ottoman literature for the high schools of the empire. In July 1911 he was one of the organizers of the student protest, demanding the right to use the Albanian alphabet that was adopted on 1908 in the Congress of Manastir, but has not been recognized by the Ottoman Empire. In 1916, in addition to being a professor, he resumed work in the Ministry of the Interior until the signing of the Armistice of Mudros.

=== Return to Albania ===
In 1919 he was the representative of the Albanian communities of the Ottoman Empire in the Paris Peace Conference. On 30 January 1920, the Congress of Lushnjë decided to overthrow the so-called the Government of Durrës for violating national interests and decided to appoint a new government. Sulejman Delvina was appointed as Prime Minister, taking into account his experience as a former official in the Ottoman Empire.In 1924 Sulejman Delvina was one of the leaders of the revolution that overthrew the regime of Ahmed Zogu and established a democratic government. Fan S. Noli became the new Prime Minister, while Sulejman Delvina was part of the new cabinet as Minister of Foreign Affairs.

He died on 1 August 1932 in Vlorë.

== Sources ==
- Elsie, Robert (2010). Historical Dictionary of Albania. Scarecrow Press. ISBN 978-0-8108-7380-3. Archived from the original on 3 October 2023.
- Fjalor enciklopedik shqiptar: N-Zh dhe një shtojcë (in Albanian). Academy of Sciences of Albania. 2009. ISBN 978-9-9956-1032-6.

Government offices
Preceded by Turhan Përmeti	Prime Minister of Albania; 1920	Succeeded by Iliaz Vrioni
