= Përmeti I Government =

- 2nd Government of Albania
- 1914
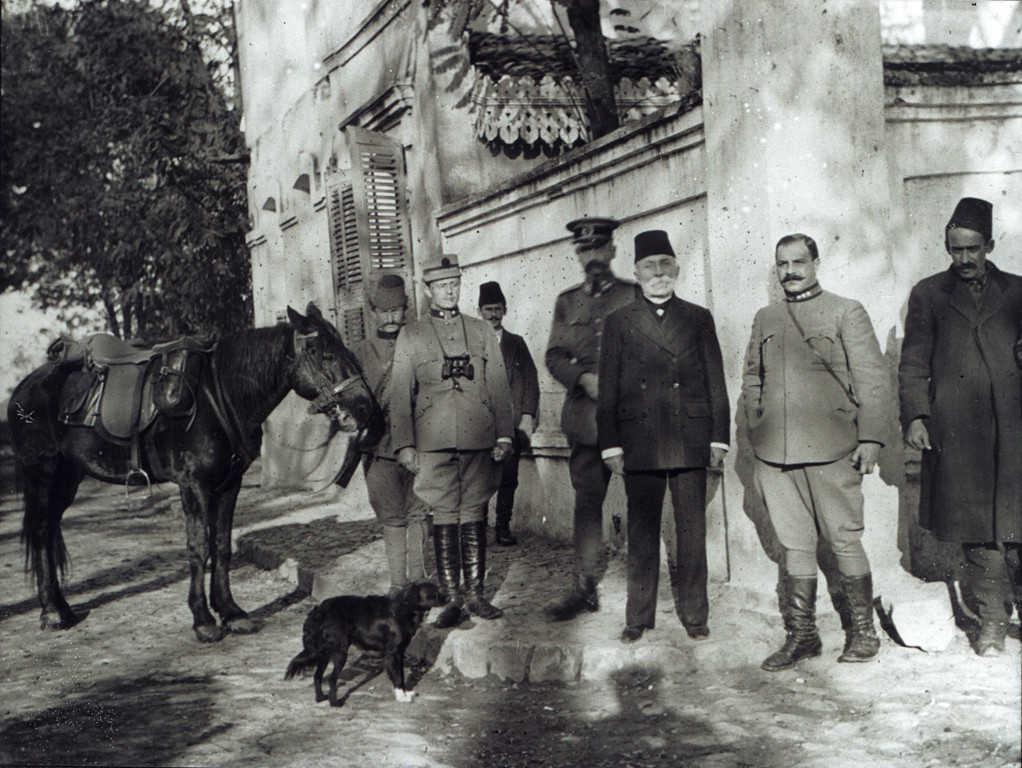
- Turhan Pasha with members of his government
- Date formed: 17 March 1914
- Date dissolved: 3 September 1914

People and organisations
- Monarch: Wilhelm of Wied
- Prime Minister: Turhan Pashë Përmeti
- No. of ministers: 8

History
- Election: Arrival of Prince Wied
- Predecessor: International Control Commission
- Successor: Toptani Government

The Përmeti I Government was the 2nd ruling government of Albania, formed on 14 March 1914, following the arrival of Prince Wied in the country.

== Overview ==
With Wied's arrival in Albania, Durrës was designated as the country's new capital. Here, Turhan Pasha Përmeti formed a government cabinet of eight ministers who for the most part were supporters of Italy. Political rivalry arose between the two allies of the newly formed Albanian State and this became more evident with Esad Toptani's departure from the government. The first and second governments of Turhan Pasha, which seemed to be a "race" between Italians and Austrians for supremacy, were ineffective and produced little to no results.

The Prime Minister grew tired of the long political and diplomatic disputes and did not have it with the right nerve to head governments that required energy, patience and of course international support. In both his governments, Përmeti cooperated with the two pashas, Esad Toptani and Aqif Biçakçiu. The two political opponents were in fact cousins, related by blood, yet they never found the language for co-governance and joint political action. But while Esad Toptani was politically sacrificed by the Austro-Hungarians, Aqif Biçakçiu followed the fall of the government which had become a casualty from the events of the First World War and the success of the insurgent uprising in Central Albania.

The prime minister and the prince, were placed in a position to govern and lead a country that was in turmoil and political instability. Both may have been competent leaders in other dissimilar situations to that of Albania. For this reason, the Minister of Internal Affairs was perceived as the main figure of the government. Turhan Pasha, in his speeches, made claims that his government would attach importance to the economy, industry, trade and education. He criticized the Greek policy of portraying the Orthodox Albanian population as greek. From an organizational point of view, aside from the Ministry of Internal Affairs, the rest of the cabinet was dysfunctional.

== Cabinet ==
Përmeti I Government
Initial Cabinet (17 March–20 May 1914)
Turhan Pasha Përmeti – Prime Minister (Note: The full mandate of a cabinet is considered as such from the moment the prime minister swears the oath of office until the day of their resignation.) and Minister of Foreign Affairs
Esad Toptani – Minister of Internal Affairs and War
Hasan Prishtina – Minister of Post-Telegraphs
Mihal Turtulli – Minister of Education
Prenk Bib Doda – Minister of Public Works (did not serve in office)
Gaqo Adhamidhi – Minister of Finances
Aziz Vrioni – Minister of Agriculture
Mufid Libohova – Minister of Justice and Cults
Cabinet Reshuffle (May 28, 1914)
Aqif Pasha Elbasani – Minister of Internal Affairs and substitutive of War (Note: The title "Substitutive" (gheg albanian: Zavëndësisht), often using the acronym "Zav.", references to the temporary exercise of duty by an official who was not formally appointed by the prime minister but occupied the interim role of the vacant minister.)
Mufid Libohova – Minister of Justice
Kara Seit Pasha – Minister of War (from August 1914)
Prenk Bib Doda – Minister of Foreign Affairs
Filip Noga – Minister of Finances
Mihal Turtulli – Minister of Education
Mid'hat Frashëri – Minister of Public Works and Post-Telegraphs
Abdi Toptani – Minister of Agriculture (Note: The ministers are listed by rank of importance.)
––––––––––––––––––––––––––––––––––––––––––––––––––––––––––––
1. Ministries of Internal Affairs and War split up.
2. Ministry of Cults was dissolved in the new government reshuffle.
3. Ministries of Public Works and Post-Telegraphs were merged.

== See also ==
- Politics of Albania
- Turhan Pasha Përmeti
