= Spiro Jorgo Koleka =

Albanian politician (c. 1880–1940)

Spiro Jorgo Koleka NK
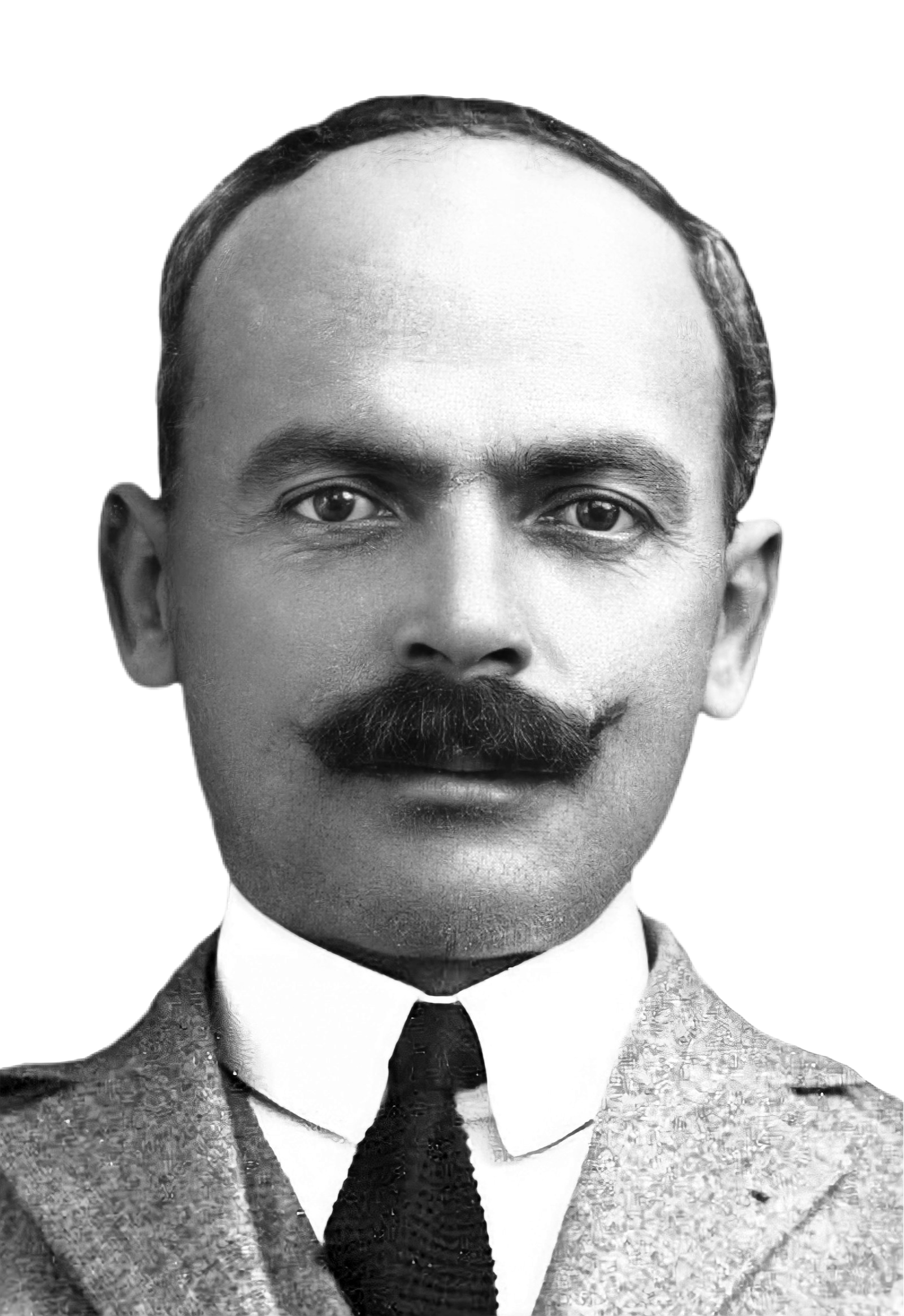
- Koleka in 1921

10th Minister of Public Works of Albania
- In office 24 December 1921 – 30 May 1923
- Preceded by: Kostaq Paftali
- Succeeded by: Sejfi Vllamasi

Personal details
- Born: 1879/1880 Vuno, Janina Vilayet, Ottoman Empire
- Died: 25 November 1940 (aged 59–60)
- Relations: Spiro Koleka (cousin; see there for more)

Spiro Jorgo "Gogo" Koleka (Albanian: [ˈspiɾɔ ˈjɔɾɡɔ kɔˈlɛka]; 1879 or 1880 – 1940) was an Albanian politician active in the 1920s.

== Life ==
Born in the village of Vuno, near Himara in 1879/1880. Edi Rama has maternal descendant of the Koleka family, he said that the family is from Mirdita, and that the surname was derived from an ancestor named Kol Leka. He is also related to Spiro Koleka, who was from the same village of Vuno and the same Koleka family.

He was one of the leaders of the Albanian exiles in Greece that planned to liberate southern Albania, at the time being under Greek control, while other leaders such as Sotir Petzigat Brindisi and Mustafa Kruja were in Vienna.

Later Koleka was an important representative at the Congress of Lushnjë (28–31 January 1920) and was responsible for implementing many of its decisions. Koleka also played a key role as an organiser in the Vlora War against the Italians (June–September 1920). He was the Albanian government representative concerning the Himara question in 1921. He served as Minister of Public Works (Albanian: Ministër i Punëve Botore) in 1922 and 1924, respectively in the cabinets of Ahmet Zogolli and Shefqet Vërlaci.

== Annotations ==
- Name: Spiro J. Koleka, Spiro G. Koleka, Spiro Kolleka.

== Sources ==
- Bon, Nataša Gregoriè (2008). Prostori neskladij: etnografija prostora in kraja v vasi Dhërmi/Drimades, Južna Albanija. Založba ZRC. pp. 141–144. ISBN 978-961-254-083-8.
