= Delvina Government =

- 5th Government of Albania
- 1920
- Date formed: 30 January 1920
- Date dissolved: 14 November 1920

People and organisations
- Prime Minister: Sulejman Delvina
- Deputy Prime Minister: Eshref Frashëri
- No. of ministers: 9

History
- Election: Congress of Lushnjë
- Predecessor: Government of Durrës
- Successor: Vrioni I Government

The Delvina Government was the 5th ruling government of Albania, led by Sulejman Delvina. It was formed after the events at the Congress of Lushnjë which laid the foundation for the first democratic legislative elections to be held in the country the following year.

== Legacy ==
The administration of Sulejman Delvina expanded the role of government throughout the territory of Albania. It consolidated the rule of law, continued diplomatic negotiations to ensure the country's territorial integrity as defined by the London Treaty of 1913, expelled the presence of foreign troops and created new legislation to address its economic recovery efforts. It had a cabinet of eleven members which consisted of the following:

== Cabinet ==
Delvina Government
Sulejman Delvina – Prime Minister
Eshref Frashëri – Deputy Prime Minister and Minister of Public Works
Ahmet Zogu – Minister of Internal Affairs
Hoxha Kadri – Minister of Justice
Sotir Peci – Minister of Education
Mehmed Konica – Minister of Foreign Affairs
Ali Riza Kolonja – Minister of War (until 4 November 1920)
Ndoc Çoba – Minister of Finances
Bajram Curri – Minister without portfolio (until 27 May 1920)
Hysen Vrioni – Minister without portfolio (until 27 May 1920)
Spiro Jorgo Koleka – Minister without portfolio (until 27 May 1920)

== See also ==
- Politics of Albania
- Sulejman Delvina
