= Ylli Bufi =

Albanian politician (born 1948)

Prime Minister of Albania
- In office 5 June 1991 – 10 December 1991
- President: Ramiz Alia
- Preceded by: Fatos Nano
- Succeeded by: Vilson Ahmeti

Personal details
- Born: 25 May 1948 (age 76); Tirana, People's Socialist Republic of Albania
- Political party: Socialist Party (PS)
- Relations: Ksanthipi Bufi (mother)

Ylli Bufi (born 25 May 1948) is an Albanian politician. He served as Prime Minister of Albania in 1991.

== Life and career ==
Ylli Bufi was born on 25 May 1948 in Tirana, then part of the People's Socialist Republic, present Albania. Bufi is a chemical engineer. He was a member of the Albanian Parliament, and also a member of Socialist Party of Albania. He served as the minister of food led by the then prime minister Fatos Nano. On 5 June 1991, he was appointed prime minister, replacing Nano, and served until 10 December 1991.
