= List of prime ministers of Victor Emmanuel III =

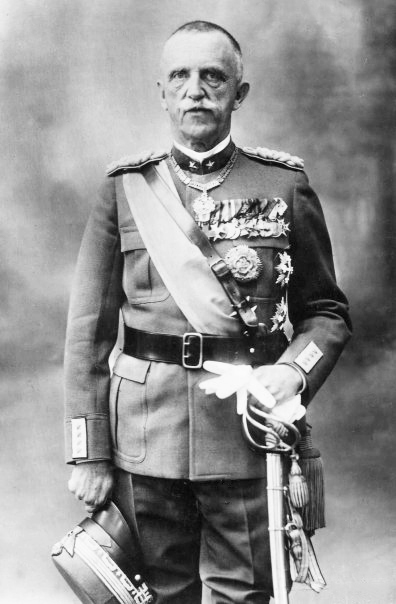
King Victor Emmanuel III

King Victor Emmanuel III was the monarch of the Kingdom of Italy, from 29 July 1900 until his abdication on 9 May 1946. Albania was an Italian protectorate from April 1939 until May 1943 and Victor Emmanuel ruled the country in a personal union.

During his reign Victor Emmanuel was served by a total of 21 prime ministers; 17 from Italy and 4 from Albania.

== List of prime ministers ==
=== Italy ===
1		Giuseppe Saracco	24 June 1900	15 February 1901
2		Giuseppe Zanardelli	15 February 1901	3 November 1903
3		Giovanni Giolitti	3 November 1903	12 March 1905
4		Tommaso Tittoni	12 March 1905	28 March 1905
5		Alessandro Fortis	28 March 1905	8 February 1906
6		Sidney Sonnino	8 February 1906	29 May 1906
(3)		Giovanni Giolitti	29 May 1906	11 December 1909
(6)		Sidney Sonnino	11 December 1909	31 March 1910
7		Luigi Luzzatti	31 March 1910	30 March 1911
(3)		Giovanni Giolitti	30 March 1911	21 March 1914
8		Antonio Salandra	21 March 1914	18 June 1916
9		Paolo Boselli	18 June 1916	29 October 1917
10		Vittorio Emanuele Orlando	29 October 1917	23 June 1919
11		Francesco Saverio Nitti	23 June 1919	15 June 1920
(3)		Giovanni Giolitti	15 June 1920	4 July 1921
12		Ivanoe Bonomi	4 July 1921	26 February 1922
13		Luigi Facta	26 February 1922	31 October 1922
14		Benito Mussolini	31 October 1922	25 July 1943
15		Pietro Badoglio	25 July 1943	18 June 1944
(12)		Ivanoe Bonomi	18 June 1944	19 June 1945
16		Ferruccio Parri	21 June 1945	8 December 1945
17		Alcide De Gasperi	10 December 1945	9 May 1946
=== Albania ===
No.	Portrait	Name	Date of ascension/Took office	Date of death/Left office
1		Shefqet Vërlaci	12 April 1939	4 December 1941
2		Mustafa Merlika-Kruja	4 December 1941	19 January 1943
3		Ekrem Libohova	19 January 1943	13 February 1943
4		Maliq Bushati	13 February 1943	12 May 1943
(3)		Ekrem Libohova	12 May 1943	9 September 1943
