= Liktori =

- Publisher: Albanian Fascist Party
- Founded: July 9, 1939
- Ceased publication: 1943
- Political alignment: Fascism
- Language: Albanian language, Italian language
- Headquarters: Korçë
- Country: Albanian Kingdom

Liktori ('Lictor') was a twice-weekly Albanian-Italian bilingual newspaper published from Korçë during the Italian occupation of Albania. The newspaper was founded on July 9, 1939, replacing Korça fashiste ('Fascist Korçë') of Zhan Gorguzi (founded just a few days before). Initially Dr. Guljelm Deba served as the director of Liktori. On September 14, 1940 (issue no. 124) Lluka Bibi took over as director.

Liktori was the organ of the Korçë provincial federation of the Albanian Fascist Party. It was one of five newspapers published in Albania at the time (all bilingual fascist organs).

The format of the newspaper varied between 36x58 centimetres and 40x58 cm. The newspaper used Tosk orthography. The newspaper carried four or pages, one of them in Italian language. It was published on Thursdays and Sundays.

Liktori continued publication until 1943.
