= Këmisha e zezë =

Newspaper

- Publisher: Albanian Fascist Party
- Editor-in-chief: Sezai Kemal
- General manager: Jup Kazazi
- Founded: 12 August 1939
- Political alignment: Fascism
- Language: Albanian language, Italian language
- Headquarters: Vlorë
- Country: Albanian Kingdom

Këmisha e zezë ('Blackshirts') was a weekly Albanian-Italian bilingual newspaper published from Vlorë during the Italian occupation of Albania. The newspaper was founded on August 12, 1939. It was the organ of the Vlorë provincial federation of the Albanian Fascist Party. Jup Kazazi served as its managing director and Sezai Kemal was the editor-in-chief of the newspaper.

Its issues contained two or four pages, 42x58 centimetres. Këmisha e zezë used Tosk orthography. One page was printed in Italian.

It was one of five newspapers published in Albania at the time (all bilingual fascist organs).
