= Korça fashiste =

- General manager: Zhan Gorguzi
- Founded: 1 July 1939
- Political alignment: Fascism
- Language: Albanian language
- Headquarters: Korçë
- Country: Albanian Kingdom

Korça fashiste ('Fascist Korçë') was short-lived Albanian language (Tosk) newspaper published from Korçë in 1939. The newspaper was founded on July 1, 1939, replacing Gazeta e Korçës ('Korçë Gazette') of Zhan Gorguzi. Zhan Gorguzi served as the director of Korça fashiste. On 9 July 1939 the newspaper was replaced by Liktori.
