= Mborje =

- Village
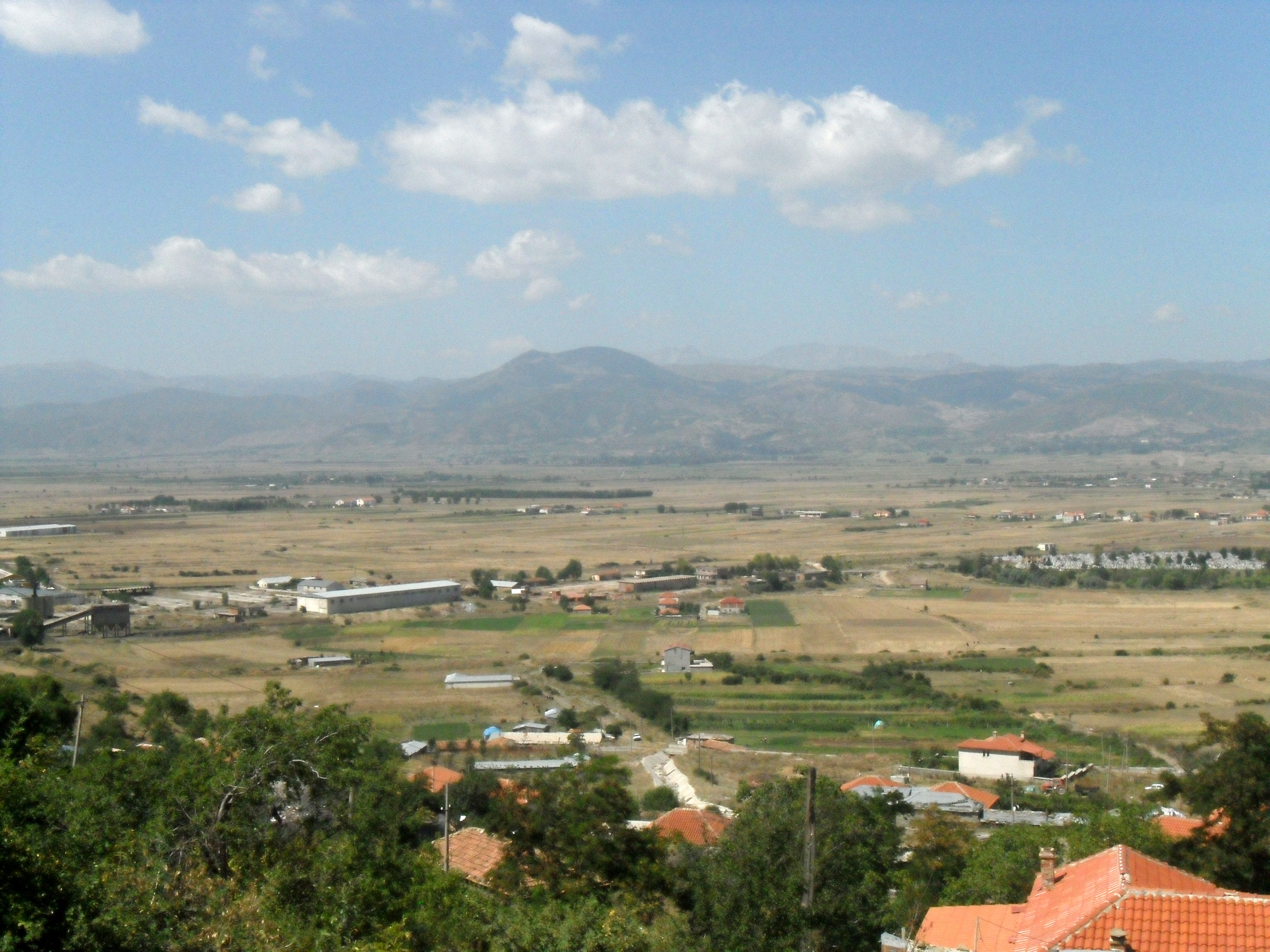

- Location within Albania
- Coordinates: 40°36′12″N 20°48′11″E
- Country: Albania
- County: Korçë
- Municipality: Korçë
- Administrative unit: Drenovë
- Time zone: UTC+1 (CET)
  - Summer (DST): UTC+2 (CEST)

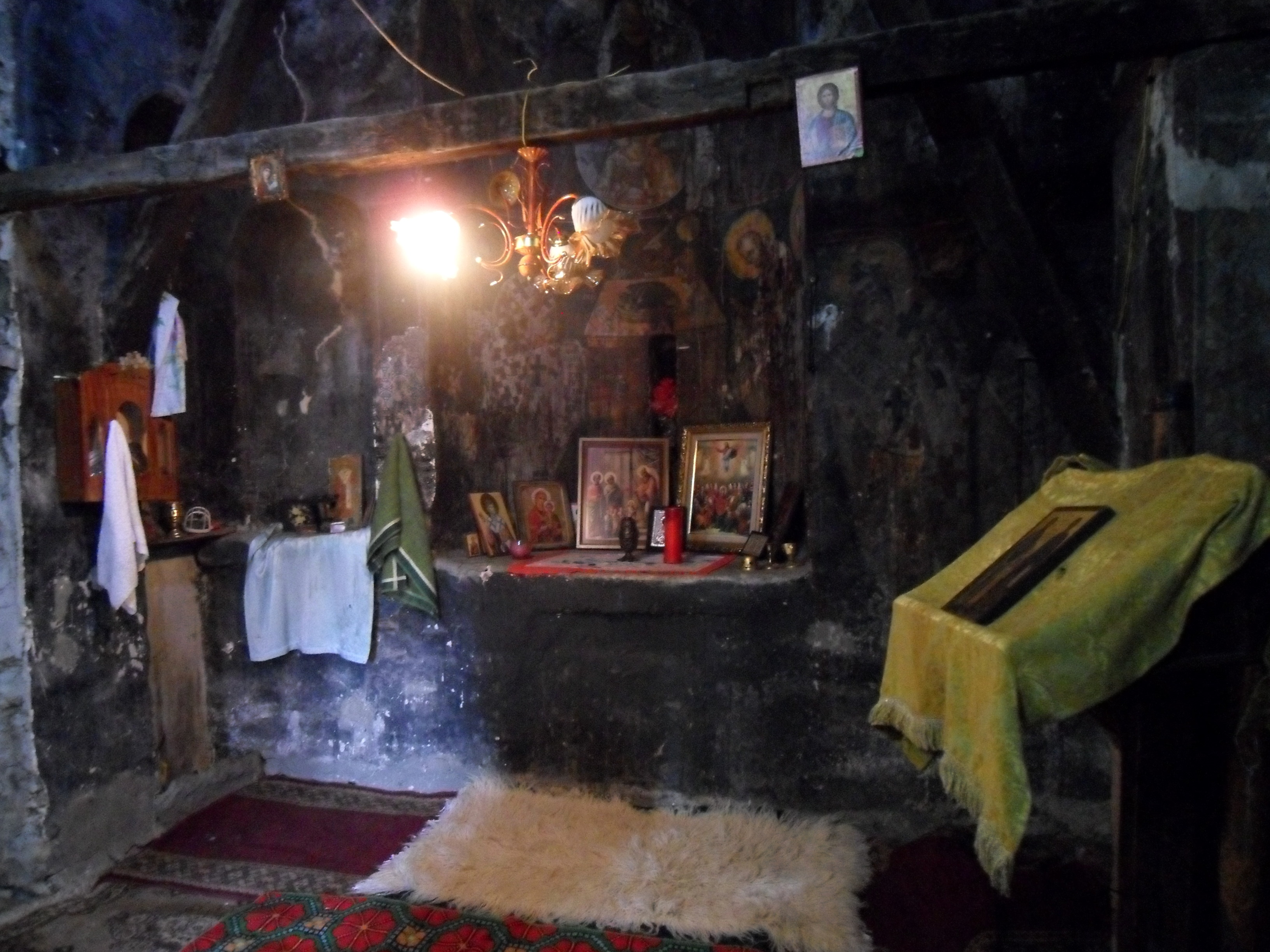
Interior of church in Mborje

Mborje is a settlement in the Korçë County, southeastern Albania. At the 2015 local government reform it became part of the municipality Korçë. It is a southeastern suburb of Korçë.

== History ==
The Holy Resurrection Church (Albanian: Kisha e Ristozit), a 14th-century church (13 November 1389), is one of the most important cultural monuments of the settlement.

By the end of the 15th century, after Korçë was founded by Ilias Bey Mirahori, a local converted Muslim Albanian lord, the new town must have been dominated initially by the old castle of Mborje. Throughout the 15th century and the beginning of the 16th century the castle was maintained by the Ottomans. The Tapu Defter of 1519 records a cemaat of Christian müsellems in the castle. According to this document the village of Mborje (Enboryo), which depended on Korçë (Görice), numbered 88 households of Christians and 18 households of Muslims.

== Notable people ==
- Dhimitër Mborja, signatory of the Albanian Declaration of Independence
- Tefik Mborja, general secretary of the Albanian Fascist Party
- Thanas Viso Mborja, activist of the Albanian National Awakening

== Bibliography ==
- Kiel, Machiel (1990). Ottoman Architecture in Albania, 1385-1912. Islamic art series. Vol. 5. Research Centre for Islamic History, Art and Culture. ISBN 9290633301.
