= Ligor Buzi =

Albanian-American journalist

Ligor Buzi (1915–1994) was an Albanian-American journalist. Buzi is remembered as one of the early pro-Fascists in Albania. After World War II, he settled in US and played an active role as member of the Albanian-American community.

== Life ==
Buzi was born in Lubonjë village of Vithkuq which is within the Korçë region, in South Albania, on 27 November 1915. At some point he studied law and graduated as Doctor of Law from the University of Bologna, Italy. During the Italian occupation of Albania (1939-1943) he was one of the most active leaders of the Albanian Lictor Youth (ALY), the youth wing of the Albanian Fascist Party, in Korçë area, editor of the Liktori (Lictor) newspapers of the ALY, and commentator in the Fascist propaganda radio stations. With the capitulation of Italy in 1943, he moved to Italy. In 1948, he settled in Bridgeport, CT, where he married an Albanian-American woman.
Buzi started working for the Albanian section of Radio Free Europe in June 1951. Buzi himself denied any connection with the Fascist Youth units, and said that the start of World War II found him already in Italy where he stayed until 1948.
Soon after his arrival, he welcomed in the US his friend Vasil Alarupi (1908-1977). Alarupi was known as the most trusted agent of the Fascist Italy prior and during World War II, and had moved to Latin America before coming to US. Buzi was instrumental in promoting Alarupi but this raised red flags on the American administration side and members of the Albanian-American community. Buzi was demoted from Radio Free Europe.
Nevertheless, Buzi remained member of the Assembly of Captive European Nations (ACEN). He was also an active member of the Albanian-American community, and of the Albanian American Orthodox Community. He wrote articles in press organs of the Albanian émigré in US and Europe.
He died on 2 July 1994.

== See also ==
- "Free Albania" National Committee
