= Ekrem Libohova =

Albanian politician (1882–1948)

Ekrem Libohova Bey
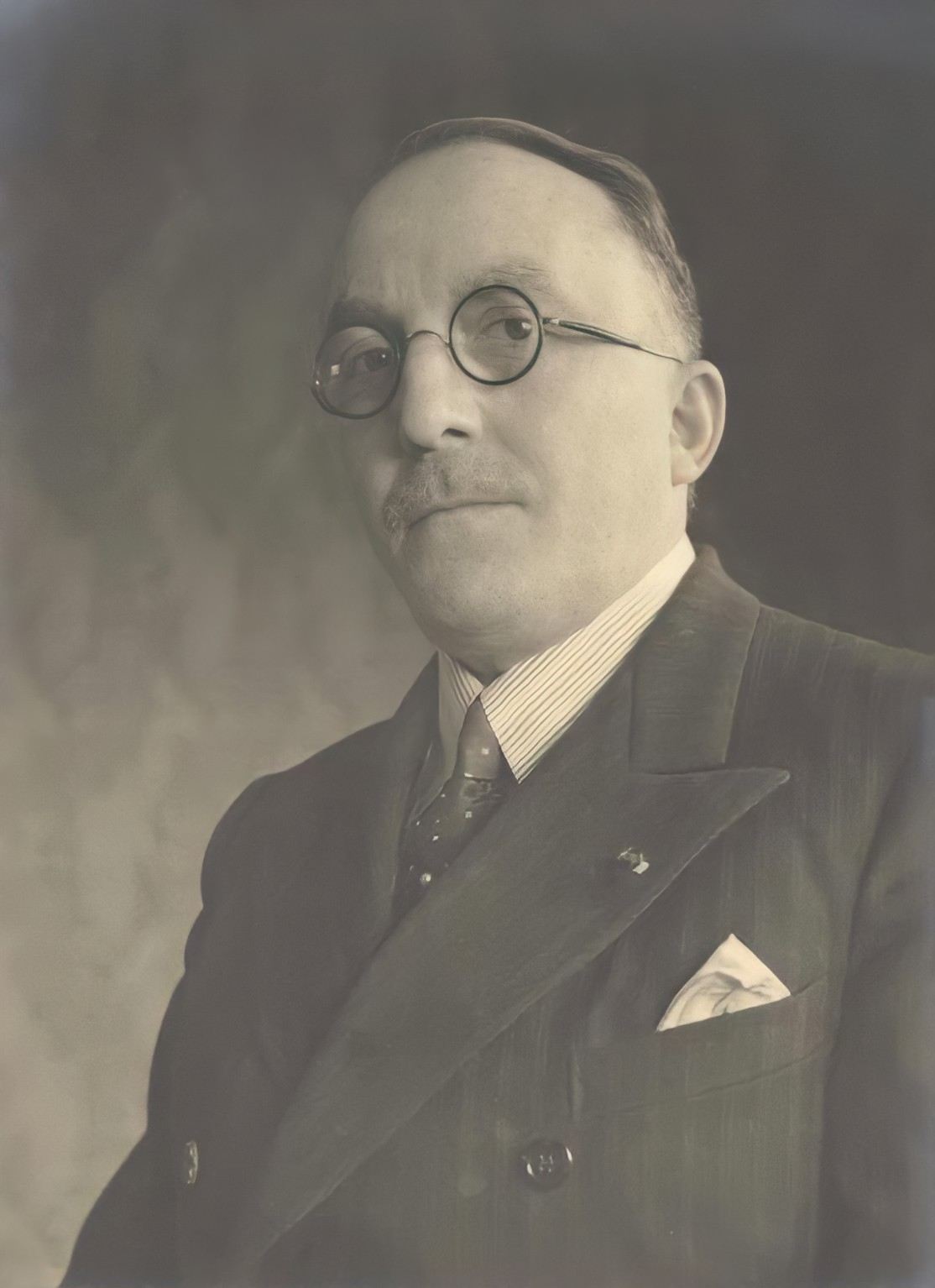

17th Prime Minister of Albania
- In office 19 January 1943 – 13 February 1943
- Monarch: Victor Emmanuel III
- Preceded by: Mustafa Merlika-Kruja
- Succeeded by: Maliq Bushati
- In office 12 May 1943 – 8 September 1943
- Monarch: Victor Emmanuel III
- Preceded by: Maliq Bushati
- Succeeded by: Rexhep Mitrovica

Personal details
- Born: 24 February 1882 Gjirokastër, Janina Vilayet, Ottoman Empire (modern-day Albania)
- Died: 7 June 1948 (aged 66) Rome, Italy
- Party: Albanian Fascist Party
- Relatives: Mufid Libohova
- Profession: Prime Minister

Ekrem Bey Libohova (24 February 1882 – 7 June 1948) was an Albanian politician and Axis collaborator. He served as the Prime Minister of Albania on two occasions during the Italian occupation of Albania.

== Political career ==
He was born in Gjirokastër and educated in Istanbul and Brussels. His brother was Mufid Libohova, who was Minister of the Interior in the Provisional Government of Albania.

Early in his political career, Libohova served as the Albanian Minister to Rome. In 1924, while serving in this role, Libohova helped negotiate the creation of the Bank of Albania. He was joined by his brother, Mufid.

In 1929, he became a minister of court to Zog I. Libohova was described as an "Italophile" by other members of Albania's political class during his time as minister to the court. On 26 January 1931, he joined King Zog on a trip to Italy. On 20 February, after attending a showing of Pagliacci at the Vienna State Opera, Libohova was injured in an assassination attempt against the King. Zog, Libohova, and their chauffeur returned fire on the attempted assassins, Aziz Çami and Ndok Gjeloshi. Libohova was shot in the leg and a bullet went through his hat; the King was unharmed.

During the 1936-1939 government of Kostaq Kotta, Libohova was Albania's foreign minister. After the Italian invasion of Albania, he left the country for Italy but returned to serve in the government of the Italian protectorate. From January 19 to February 13, 1943, and from May 12 to September 8, 1943, Libohova served as Prime Minister.

As Germany invaded Albania to replace the Italians, Libohova and Italian General Alberto Pariani escaped for Italy. Libohova died in Rome on 7 June 1948.

=== 1st Cabinet of Ekrem Libohova (19 January – 13 February 1943) ===
- Ekrem Libohova – Prime Minister and acting Minister of the Interior
- Anton Kosmaçi – Minister of Justice
- Noc Naraci – Minister of National Economy and acting Minister of Education
- Mihal Sherko – Minister of Popular Culture
- Loro Musani – Minister of Finance
- Iljaz Agushi – Minister of Public Works
- Ismet Kryeziu – Minister of Liberated Lands
- Fiqiri Dine – Minister of Internal Affairs
- Kolë Bib Mirakaj – Minister of the Fascist Party

=== 2nd Cabinet of Ekrem Libohova (11 May – 10 September 1943) ===
- Ekrem Libohova – Prime Minister and Secretary of the Fascist Party
- Iljaz Agushi – Deputy Prime Minister and Secretary of State for Public Works
- Anton Kosmaçi – Minister of Justice and Secretary of State for Education
- Kolë Bibë Mirakaj – Secretary of State for Internal Affairs
- Anton Beça – Secretary of State for Finance
- Hilmi Leka – Secretary of State for Popular Culture
- Zef Benusi – Secretary of State for Education (from 8 July 1943)
- Nexhip Basha – Secretary of State for Industry and Deputy Secretary of State for Agriculture & Forestry

Political offices
Preceded by Mustafa Merlika-Kruja	Prime Minister of Albania; 19 January 1943 – 13 February 1943	Succeeded by Maliq Bushati
Preceded by Maliq Bushati	Prime Minister of Albania; 12 May 1943 – 8 September 1943	Succeeded by Rexhep Mitrovica
