= Albanian Fascist Militia =

Albanian fascist paramilitary group

- Milicia Fashiste Shqiptare
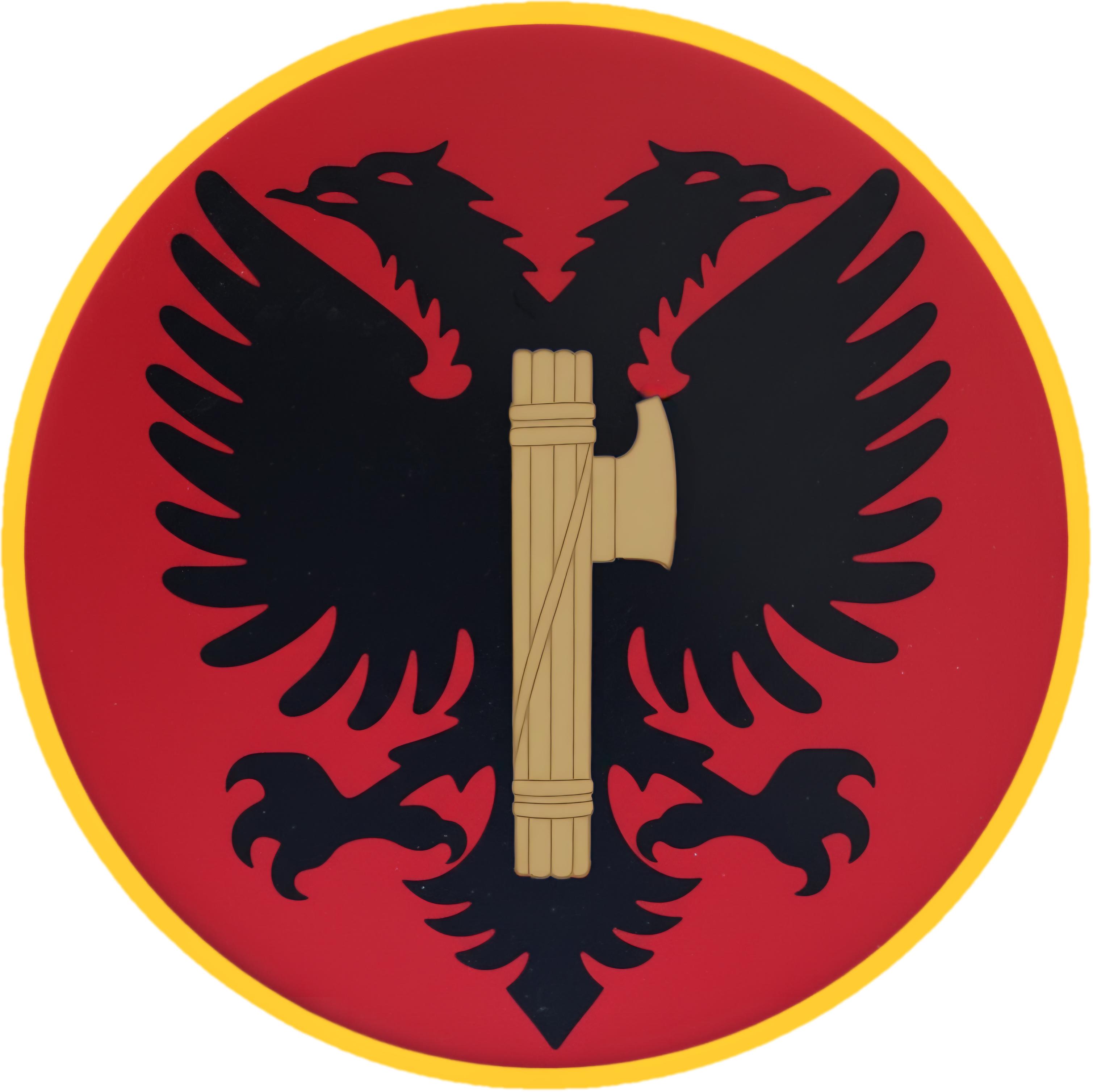
- Shoulder patch
- Active: 18 September 1939
- Disbanded: 8 September 1943
- Country: Albania (In personal union with Italy)
- Allegiance: Italy
- Type: Paramilitary, gendarmerie
- Role: Maintaining public order

Commanders
- Lieutenant General: Francesco Jacomoni

Insignia
- Headgear insignia

The Albanian Fascist Militia (MFSH) (Albanian: Milicia Fashiste Shqiptare) was an Albanian fascist paramilitary group formed in 1939, following the Italian invasion of Albania. As a wing of the Italian Blackshirts (MVSN), the militia initially consisted of Italian colonists in Albania but later Albanian volunteers were also enlisted and made the majority of the group until it was disbanded in 1943. It was headquartered in Tirana.

== History ==
The Albanian Fascist Militia (MFSH) dated 18.9.1939 was formed by Decree no. 91 of the deputy general and was part of the National Security Volunteer Militia headed by Commander General Mussolini. The militia was tasked with maintaining internal order at the request of the prime minister. Its recruitment was voluntary for all persons who met the requirements for membership of the Albanian Fascist Party (PFSH). The officers were appointed by the General Command of the Voluntary National Security Militia, following the proposal of the Commander of the Albanian Fascist Militia (MFSH), after the Secretary of the Fascist Party was consulted. NCOs, graduates, black shirts were all appointed by the MFSH commander.

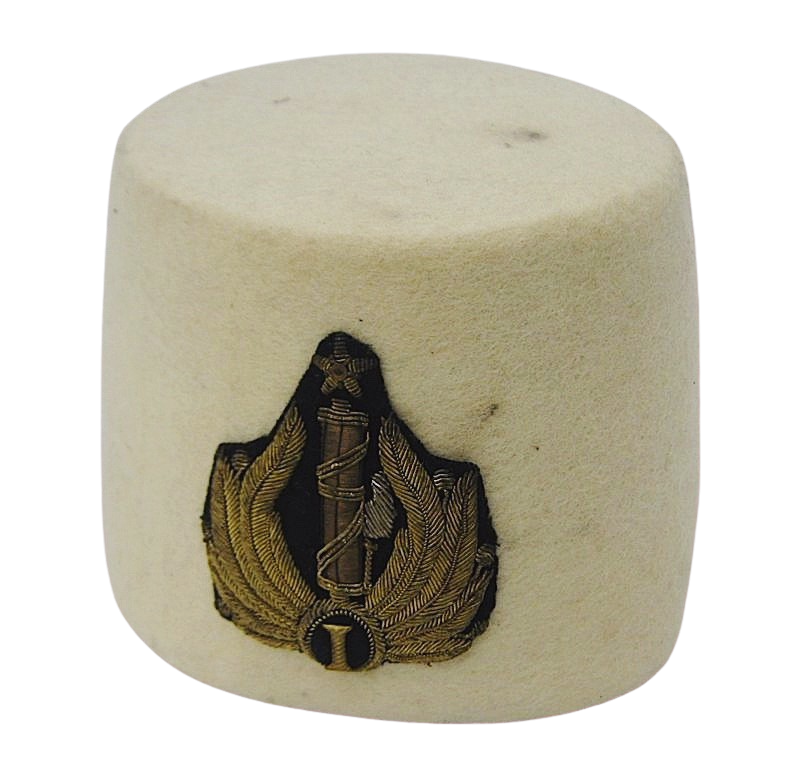
White Qeleshe headwear

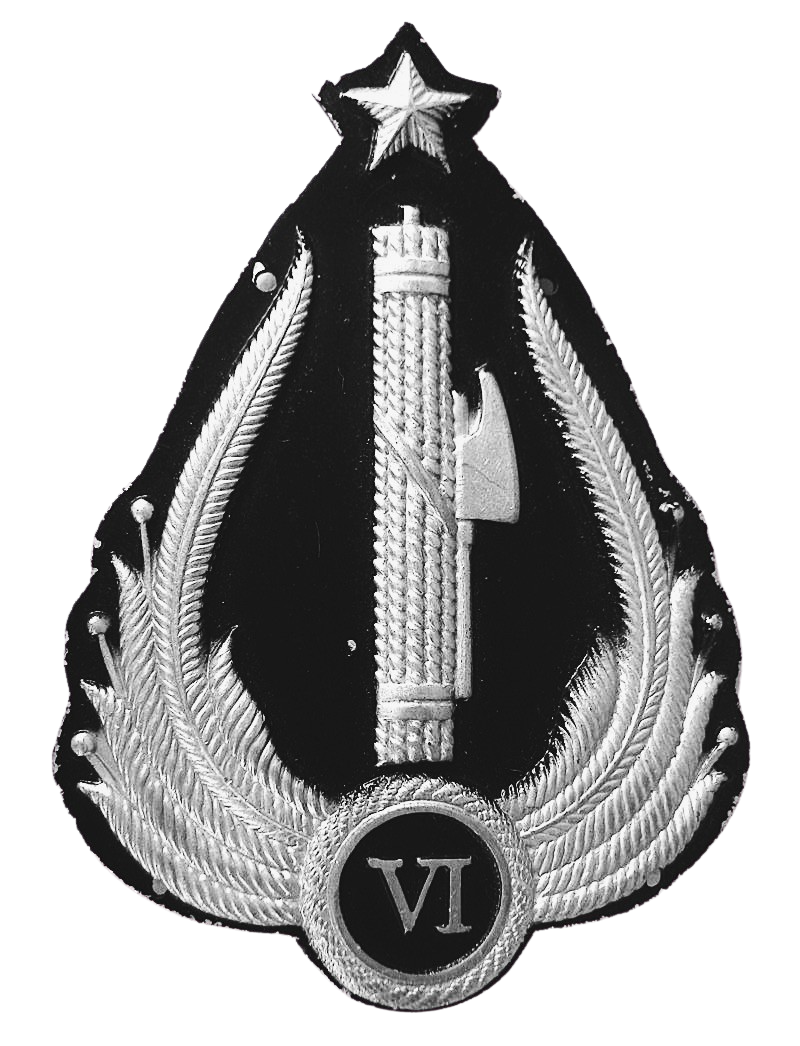
Aluminum ornament

The insignia of the Albanian Fascist Militia displayed in clothing and as an accessory.

The MFSH consisted of one command, four legions and ten cohorts. It was fully funded by the state. Besides Tirana they were also stationed in Shkodër, Korçë, and Vlorë. They were armed with Carcano M38 rifles, Beretta M1934 pistols, Breda M30 and Breda M37 machine guns, and Cannone da 47/32 infantry guns.

The militia was disbanded in 1943 following the surrender of Italy in World War II.
