= Italian colonists in Albania =

Italians who moved to Albania to colonize it for the Kingdom of Italy

Coloni italiani in Albania

Total population
- 51,000 (1941)

Languages
- Italian

Religion
- Catholicism

Related ethnic groups
- Italians

Flag of the Kingdom of Albania (1939–1943) by a decree of King Victor Emmanuel III, 28 September 1939

The Italian colonists in Albania (Albanian: Kolonistët italianë në Shqipëri, Italian: Coloni italiani in Albania) were Italians who, between the two World Wars, moved to Albania to colonize the Balkan country for the Kingdom of Italy.

There were long-term plans for 2,000,000 Italian colonists settling in Albania, eventually outnumbering the Albanian natives, who were considered inferior. Italian colonists mistreated the Albanian natives and had a colonizer's mindset, similar to the Italian colonists in Somalia.

== Background ==
Albania had held strategic importance for Italy since the Renaissance, when the Republic of Venice controlled some areas of the Albanian coast (called Albania Veneta). In addition, southern Italy contained Albanian-speaking communities (Arbëreshë people), who had taken refuge there from the Ottoman invasion of Albania during the Skanderbeg era, and who were favorable to a possible union of Albania and Italy.

At the end of the 19th century, Italian naval strategists eyed the port of Vlorë (Valona in Italian) and the island of Sazan (Saseno) at the entrance to the Bay of Vlorë. The port would give Italy control of the entrance to the Adriatic Sea. Also, Albania could provide Italy with a beachhead in the Balkans. Before World War I, Italy and Austria-Hungary had been instrumental in the creation of an independent Albanian state. At the outbreak of war in 1915, Italy seized the chance to occupy the southern half of Albania, to prevent the Austro-Hungarians from capturing it. That success did not last long, as post-war domestic problems, defeat in the Vlora War, and pressure from U.S. President Woodrow Wilson, forced Italy to pull out in 1920. But Italy retained the island of Sazan, in front of Vlorë, that was annexed to the Province of Zara in Italian Dalmatia.

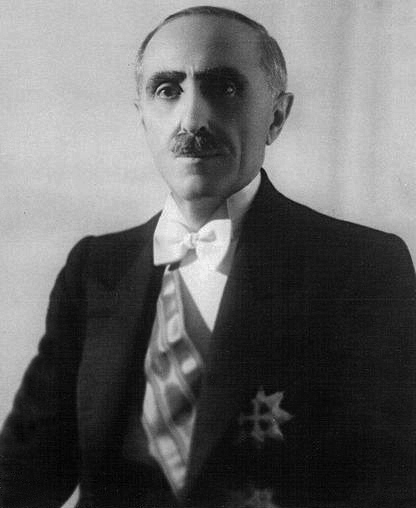
The Prime Minister of Albania Shefqet Vërlaci, who approved the settlement of Italian colonists in 1940

When Benito Mussolini took power in Italy, he turned with renewed interest to Albania. Italy began penetrating Albania's economy in 1925, when Albania agreed to allow it to exploit its mineral resources. That was followed by the First Treaty of Tirana in 1926 and the Second Treaty of Tirana in 1927, whereby Italy and Albania entered into a defensive alliance. Italian loans subsidized the Albanian government and economy, and Italian military instructors trained the Albanian army. Italian colonial settlement was encouraged and the first 300 Italian colonists settled in Albania.

Despite this strong Italian influence, King Zog of Albania refused to give in completely to Italian pressure. In 1931, he openly stood up to the Italians by refusing to renew the 1926 Treaty of Tirana.

Fascist Italy increased pressure on Albania in the 1930s and, on 7 April 1939, invaded Albania, five months before the start of World War II. The Albanian armed resistance proved ineffective and, after a short defense, Italy occupied the country. On 9 April 1939, King Zog fled to Greece, and Albania ceased to exist as an independent country. The Balkan country became a component of the Italian Empire. Albania was designed for eventual colonization and Italianization.

The throne was claimed by King Victor Emmanuel III of Italy, who was the official ruler of Albania until his abdication on 25 July 1943. The country was led by Italian governors and an Albanian civil government.

From April 1939, Albanian foreign affairs, customs, as well as natural resources came under direct control of Italy. All petroleum resources in Albania went through Agip, Italy's state petroleum company.

The puppet Albanian Fascist Party became the ruling party of the country and the local fascists, like Prime Minister Shefqet Vërlaci, allowed Italian citizens to settle in Albania and to own land so that they could gradually transform it into Italian soil. Vërlaci (who had distant Italian roots) approved the possible administrative union of Albania and Italy, because he wanted Italian support for the union of Kosovo, Southern Epirus (Chameria), and other Albanian irredentist areas with the state of Albania, creating a Greater Albania. Indeed, this unification was partially realised after the Axis defeat of Yugoslavia and Greece in spring 1941 and the expansion of Albania into Macedonia, Kosovo, Novi Pazar and Montenegro.

The Italian colonists and the Italian "assimilation" were more or less welcomed in spring 1939, and were accepted by most Albanians when Albania was enlarged two years later. However, Italian colonists mistreated the Albanian natives and had a colonizer's mindset, similar to the Italian colonists in Somalia.

In November 1941, the colonists started to face hostile demonstrations and the resistance of some Albanians, organized mainly by the Communist Party of Enver Hoxha.

== Plans for colonization ==
Albanians were considered an inferior ethnic group by Fascist Italy. In 1938, Galeazzo Ciano wrote a report to Benito Mussolini in which he proposed a long-term plan in which 2,000,000 colonists would settle from Italy to Albania. This plan was submitted to Francesco Jacomoni on 1 August 1939 and eventually accepted. Its aim was to eventually outnumber the local Albanian population. The plan included 20,000 Italian families settling in Myzeqe (ancient Apollonia).

== The Italian colonists ==
The process of colonization began in 1926 with 300 colonists. After the occupation of Albania in April 1939, the process swiftly accelerated, with Mussolini sending nearly 11,000 Italian colonists to Albania. Most of them were from the Veneto region and Sicily. They settled primarily in the areas of Durrës, Vlorë, Shkodër, Porto Palermo, Elbasan and Sarandë. They were the first settlers of a huge group of Italians to be moved to Albania. Italian colonists mistreated the Albanian natives and had a colonial mentality, similar to the Italian colonists in Somalia.

In addition to these colonists, 22,000 Italian casual laborers went to Albania in April 1940 to construct roads, railways and infrastructure. During the Greco-Italian War, these laborers had reached 58,000.

Most of the 1939 colonists were men enrolled in the Albanian Fascist Militia. This organization was an Albanian fascist paramilitary group, part of the Blackshirts. Later even Albanians were recruited in the group. It was headquartered in Tirana and consisted of four legions in Tirana, Korçë, Vlorë and Shkodër. The Albanian Fascist Militia was disbanded in 1943 following the fall of Italy in World War II.

No Italian colonists remain in Albania. The few who remained under the communist regime of Enver Hoxha fled (with their descendants) to Italy in 1992.

== See also ==
- Italian protectorate of Albania (1939–1943)
- Italian invasion of Albania
- Shefqet Vërlaci

== Bibliography ==
- Fischer, Bernd Jürgen. Albania at War, 1939–1945. Hurst. London, 1999 ISBN 1-85065-531-6
- Lamb, Richard. Mussolini as Diplomat. Fromm International Ed. London, 1999 ISBN 0-88064-244-0
- Payne, Stanley G. A History of Fascism, 1914–45. University of Wisconsin Press. Madison, Wisc., 1995 ISBN 0-299-14874-2
- Pearson, Owen. Albania in the Twentieth Century, A History: Volume II: Albania in Occupation and War, 1939–45. Tauris Publisher. New York, 2006 ISBN 1-84511-104-4, ISBN 978-1-84511-104-5
- Rosselli, Alberto. Storie Segrete. Operazioni sconosciute o dimenticate della seconda guerra mondiale Iuculano Editore. Pavia, 2007
- Library of Congress Country Study of Albania
