= Malli i Mëmëdheut =

Albanian patriotic organisation in the United States

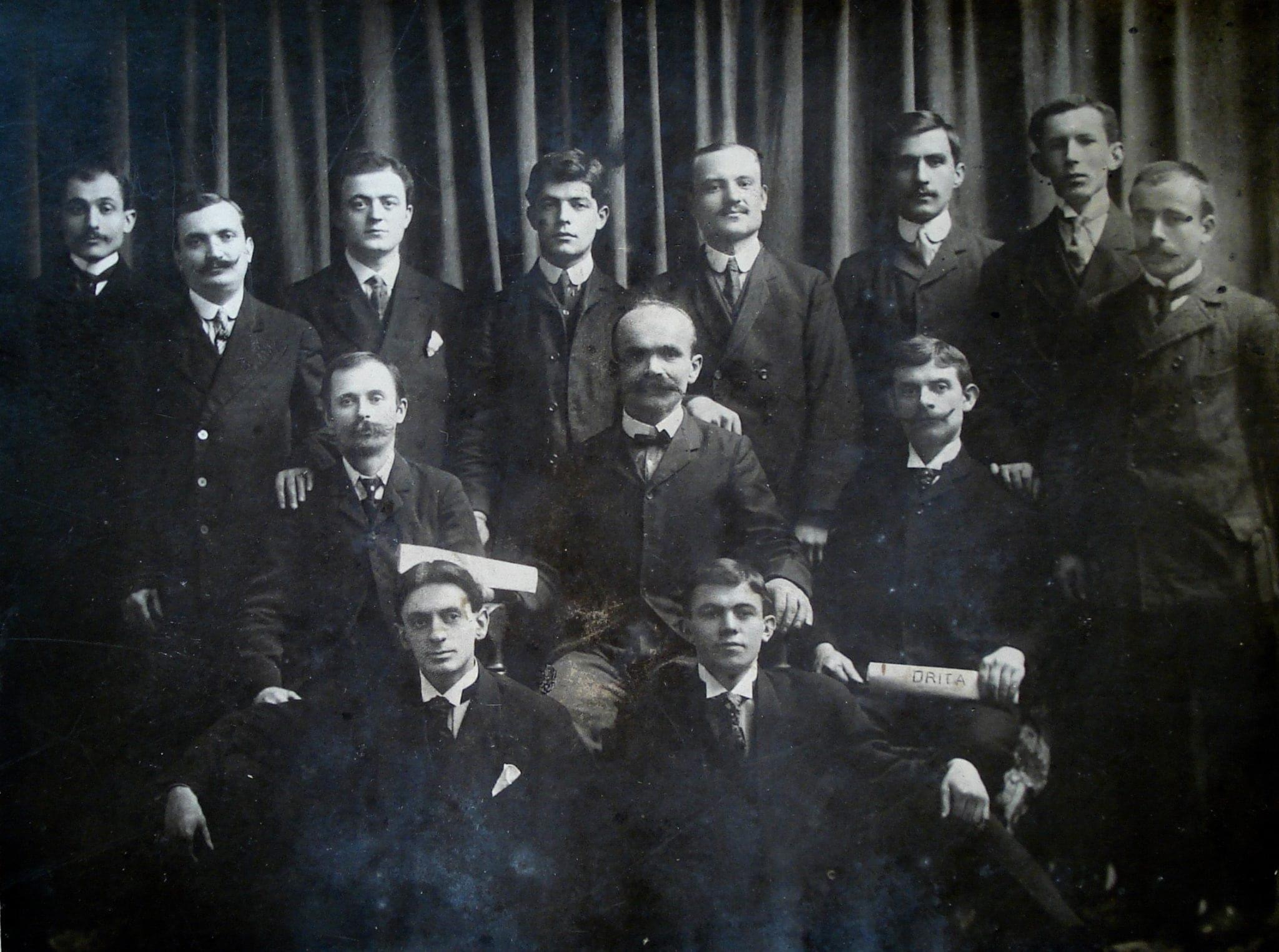
Members of the organization "Malli i Mëmëdheut" on January 1, 1906

Malli i Mëmëdheut ("Longing for the Motherland") was the first Albanian patriotic organisation in the United States. Founded on December 31, 1905 in Jamestown, New York State by Albanian immigrants from the region of Korçë, its purpose was the protection and promotion of Albanian culture, and mutual assistance between Albanians in the country.

== History ==
In the early 20th century. the New York area had become a destination for Albanians who sought economic and social prosperity outside the Ottoman Empire. As the size of the Albanian community of the area and other parts of the United States grew, both the need and opportunity to better organize collaboration within the community became a focus of Albanian American intellectuals. In this context, the Orthodox Christian members from the Albanian communities of Buffalo and Jamestown in New York State came together to found Malli i Mëmëdheut in January 1906. Its founders were Albanian patriots from the region of Korçë, and included Petro Nini Luarasi, Mina Grameno, Thanas Floqi, Kol Rikashi, Pandi Lipi Kallanxhiu, Thimi Nuni Boçka, Pandi Mihal Furxhi, Dhimitraq Zisi Negovani, Vani Odo Karameta, Vani Vangjeli, Thanas Halle, Mihallaq Kristaq Bimbli and Thanas Viso Mborja. Its purpose was the protection and promotion of Albanian culture, and mutual assistance between Albanians in the country. The members continuously organised meetings and activities, and jointly collaborated with Albanian intellectuals outside the United States, with the primary aim being helping the contemporary Albanian National Awakening that sought the creation of an Albanian state independent of the Ottoman Empire. Malli i Mëmëdheut arranged for Fan Noli to be sent from Egypt, who after his arrival in the US (1906) became associated with the organisation and became a prominent member of the US Albanian community. After growing gradually both in size and importance, in 1913 Malli i Mëmëdheut merged into Vatra, another prominent Albanian patriotic organisation in the United States.

== See also ==
- Albanian Diaspora
