= Thanas Viso Mborja =

Thanas Viso Mborja was an Albanian patriot and activist of the Albanian National Awakening.

== Life ==
Thanas Viso Mborja was born in Mborje in 1876. He started receiving education in the Romanian school of Korçë until 1887, when together with three other classmates became the first pupils of Mësonjëtorja, the first Albanian language school. He later emigrated to Romania where he became friends with Pandeli Evangjeli, who gave him books to read in Albanian and who enabled him to meet other patriots. Mborja eventually became secretary of the library of the Albanian society Dituria and began to teach the alphabet to apprentices. In 1901 he moved to Philadelphia, United States, and later to Buffalo, where he found a job in the wood-transport industry. When Fan Noli moved there, Mborja offered him help and found him a job. Mborja also became one of the founders of the Malli i Mëmëdheut society. Convinced by Bajo Topulli, Mborja returned to Korçë in 1908 and joined Topulli's band just two months before the Young Turk revolution broke out. His written memories are important for understanding the dynamics and key figures of that period of Albanian history.
