= Albanian Lictor Youth =

Youth wing of the Albanian Fascist Party

Albanian Lictor Youth Djelmnia e Liktorit Shqiptar
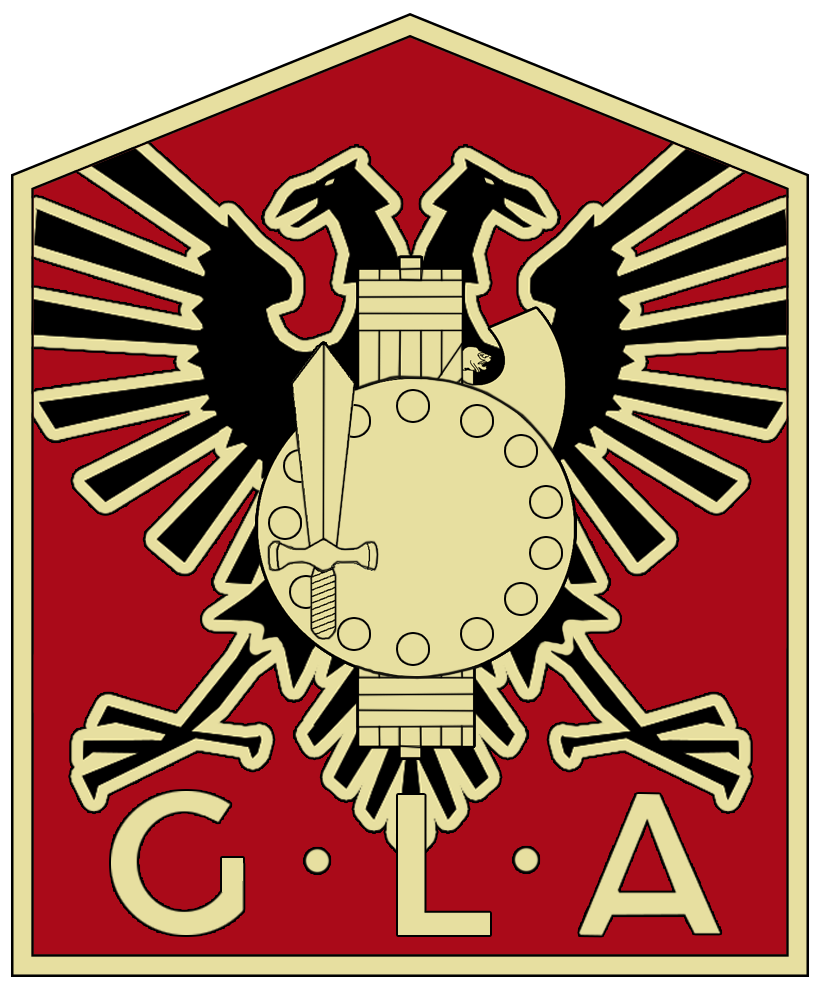
- Leader: Giovanni Giro
- Founded: 2 June 1939
- Dissolved: 27 July 1943
- Headquarters: Tirana, Albania
- Ideology: Fascism
- Mother party: Albanian Fascist Party

Albanian Lictor Youth (Albanian: Djelmnia e Liktorit Shqiptar, Italian: Gioventù del Littorio Albanese, abbreviated G.L.A.) was a youth organization which served as the youth wing of the Albanian Fascist Party. The Albanian Lictor Youth was one of the associated organizations of the Albanian Fascist Party, as stipulated in its statute, which was formulated in a decree of the Italian vicegerent issued on 2 June 1939.

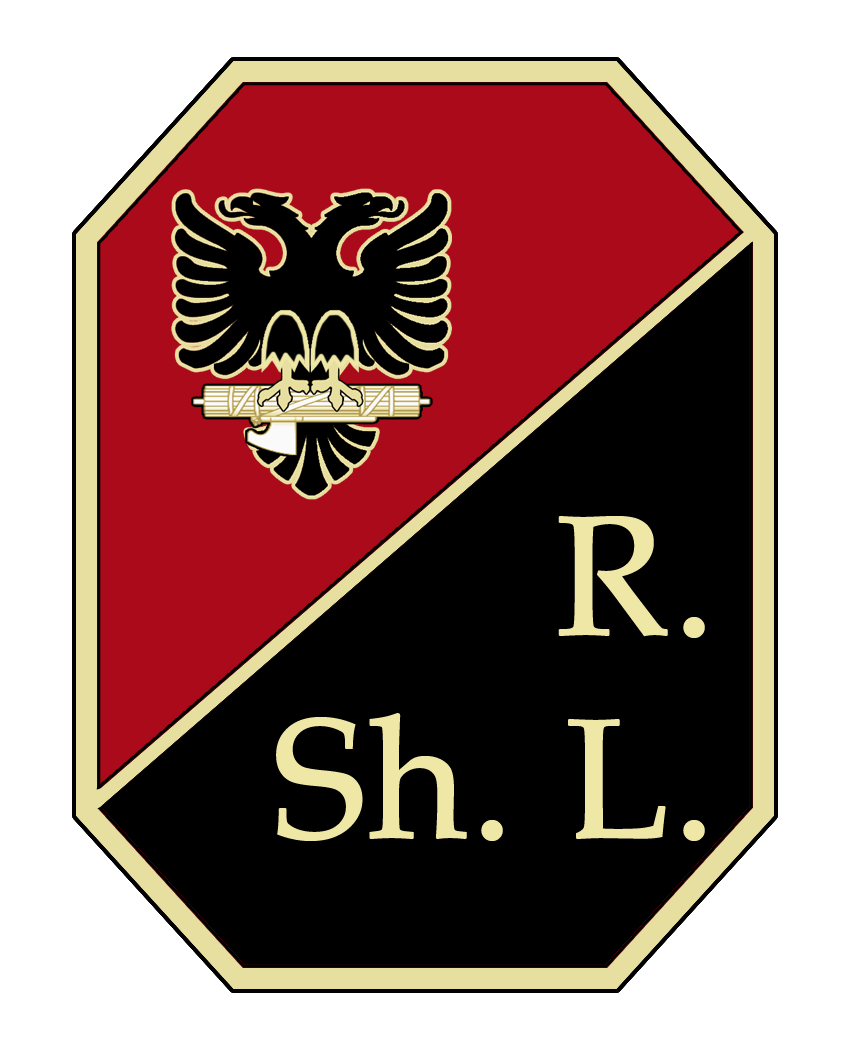
Alternative Emblem of the Albanian Lictor Youth.

Giovanni Giro, an Italian fascist official, had been sent to Albania to organize a fascist youth movement there prior to the Italian annexation of the country. However, these efforts had been largely unsuccessful. On the contrary, his activities created various diplomatic incidents.

Following the Italian invasion of Albania in April 1939, Achille Starace, a leading fascist organizer, was sent to Albania to set up the Albanian Fascist Party and the Albanian Fascist Youth. ENGA, an Albanian youth organization modelled after the Italian Opera Nazionale Balilla organization merged into GLA. After the founding of the GLA, Giro remained the main organizer of the movement. The GLA was modelled after the Italian Youth of the Lictor, and was politically under the command of its Italian counterpart. The uniforms of GLA were similar to those used in Italy. Girls were organized in Female Youth of the Lictor (Gioventù Femminile del Littorio) and boys under fourteen years of age were organized in Balilla groups. Parallel to the Youth of the Lictor there were also groups of university fascists, but these groups were rather marginal as Albania had few universities.

The Italian authorities built a marble palace for the GLA in Tirana, in the same complex as the Casa del Fascio, one of a series of lavish façades that popped up in the city during Italian rule.

The organization's press organ was Liktori (Lictor) newspaper, with Ligor Buzi as editor.

Ramiz Alia, who served as head of state of Albania in 1985-1992, had been a member of the fascist youth movement, but later left it and in 1943 he joined the Communist resistance movement.
