= Thanas Floqi =

Albanian educator and patriot

Thanas V. Floqi
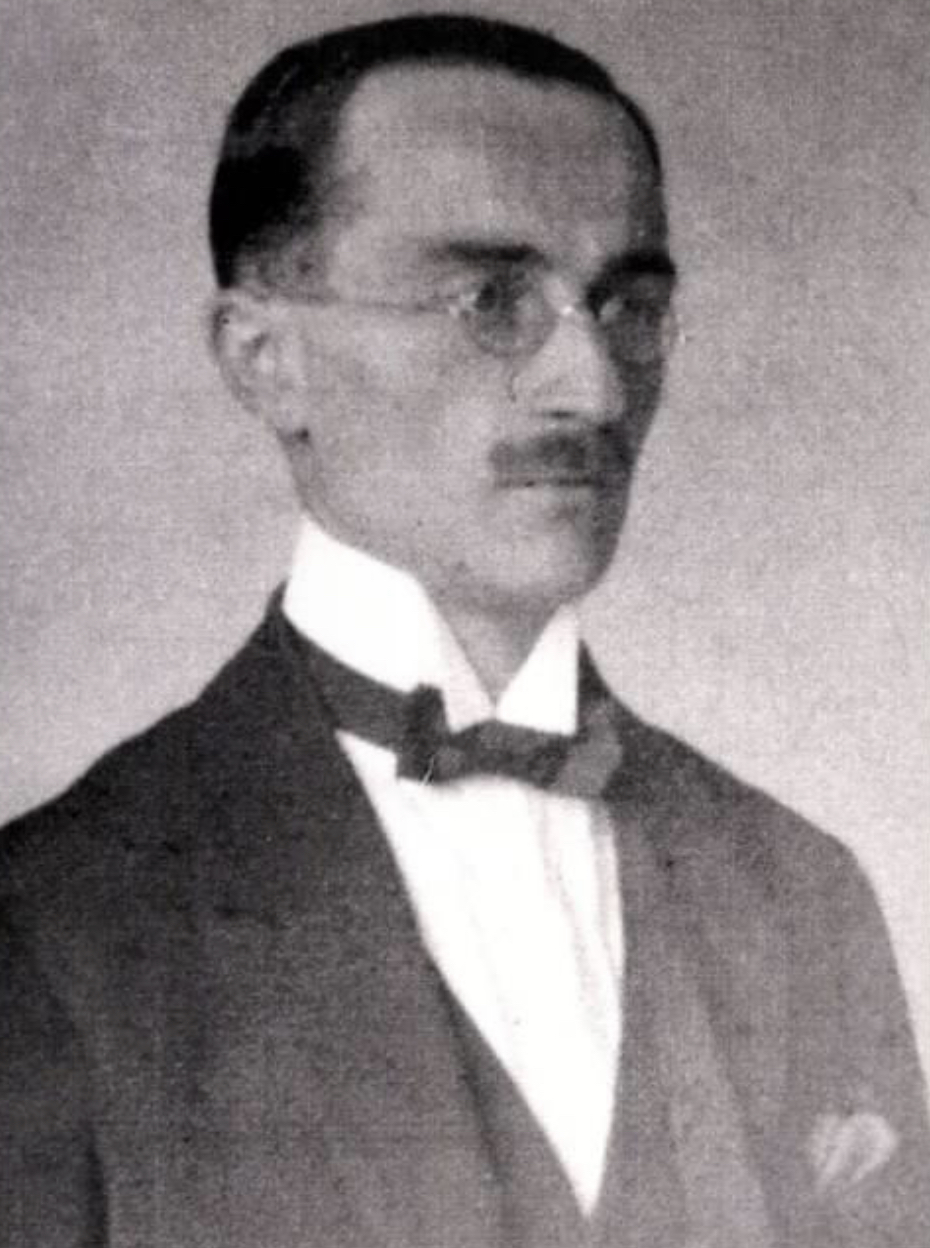
- Born: January 14, 1884; Korçë, Manastir Vilayet, Ottoman Empire (modern Albania)
- Died: February 8, 1945; Elbasan, Democratic Government of Albania
- Occupations: teacher, clerk
- Known for: Albanian Declaration of Independence, 1912 "Malli i Mëmëdheut" society
- Spouse: Anastasi Dodbiba

Thanas Floqi (14 January 1884 – 8 February 1945) was an Albanian educator and patriot, and one of the signatories of the Albanian Declaration of Independence.

He was born in Korçë, at the time in the Ottoman Empire in 1884. He was the son of Vasil Floqi, a merchant. Thanas was the younger brother of Albanian patriot, politician, and writer Kristo Floqi.

Thanas Floqi finished his early education in his home town, then went to Messolongi, where he finished high school. After that he went to Athens to study law, but did not graduate and returned home. He emigrated later to US, where he got in touch with patriotic movements of the Albanian diaspora. He was a contributor in the establishment of "Malli i Mëmëdheut" (Homeland's yearning) which a few years later would become one of the sources for "Vatra Federation". His brother Kristo would become one of the Vatra founders. Thanas would return to Albania in 1912, and settle in Vlorë, where he contributes in the expansion of Albanian education. He also focused in arts and music studies. Floqi opened the first Albanian school in Cakran, near Fier.

Thanas Floqi was one of the signatories of the Albanian Declaration of Independence on November 28, 1912. After that, he worked in the newly created Albanian administration, and as an interpreter for the International Commission of Control, and as first secretary of the Ministry of Justice. In 1913, he settled in Elbasan, where he cooperated with Aqif Pashë Elbasani and worked as a teacher in the Shkolla Normale e Elbasanit. He distinguished himself in musical activities' organizations.

== Sources ==
- "History of Albanian People" Albanian Academy of Science.ISBN 9992716231
