= Holy Resurrection Church, Mborje =

14th-century church in Albania

Holy Resurrection Church
- Kisha e Ristozit (Albanian)
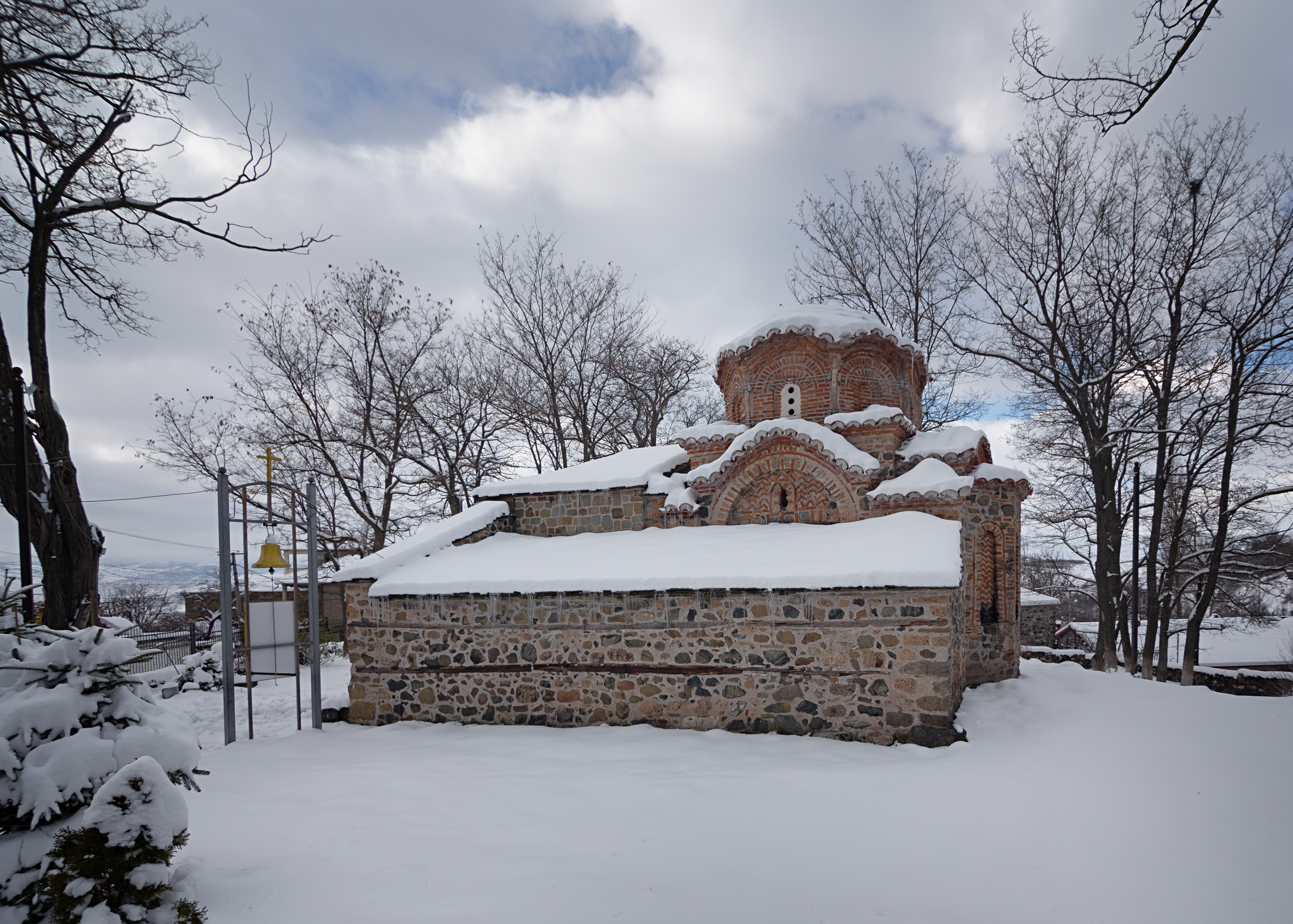
- Exterior of the church during the winter.

- Location within Albania
- 40.6058°N 20.8046°E
- Location: Mborje, Korçë County, Albania

History
- Built: 13th century to 1390

Site notes
- Governing body: DRKK Korçë

Cultural Monument of Albania
- Type: Architectural
- Criteria: I
- Designated: 1948/1971
- Part of: 586 e 487417.03.1948, September 23, 1971
- Reference no.: KO069

The Holy Resurrection Church or St. Mary's Church, Mborje (Albanian: Kisha e Ristozit) is a Cultural Monument of Albania, in Mborje, Korçë County. The church is dedicated to Saint Mary.

== History ==
The church has several possible construction dates. One tradition holds that it was built in 896 in honor of Pope Clement I, while another attests to construction in the 14th century. The church lies at the foot of Mount Morava just southeast of Korçë, and features anonymous frescoes dating to 1390. On the 40th Day after death each year, pilgrims of the Albanian Orthodox Church flock to the church.

== Description ==
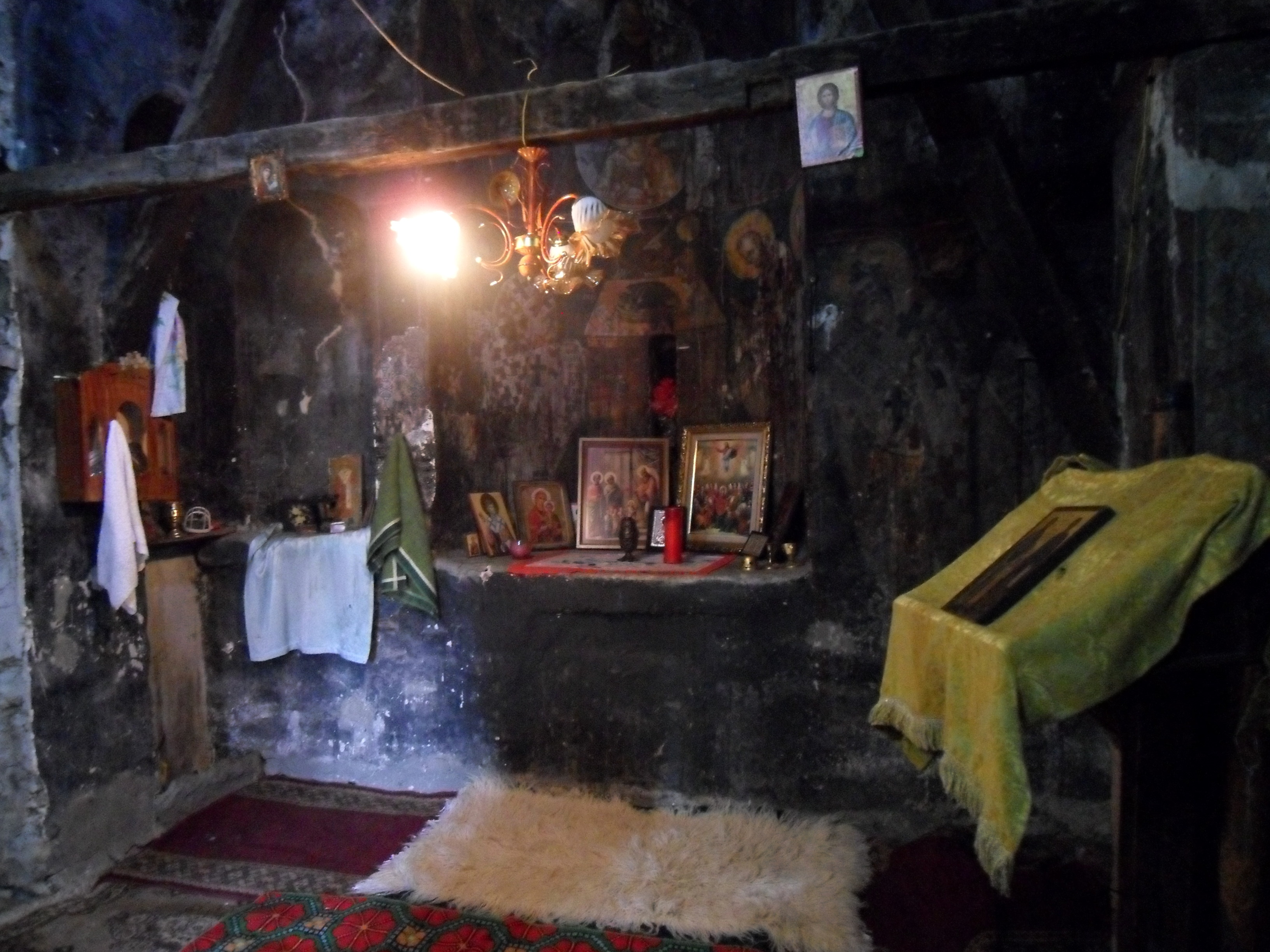

At the time it was built, the church was under the rule of the Lordship of Berat, dominated by the Muzaka family of feudal lords. A bishop named Nimfoni collected funds for construction from 1389 to 1390. A striking if small edifice, it belongs to a group of churches with an engraved cross lacking internal reinforcement. A central square cella topped with a dome forms the center, connected by two open gates (one to the south and one to the west) with the portico. The church is only 7.5 metres (25 ft) at its highest.

Maintenance work was needed to avoid collapse in 2015.
