= Iljaz Agushi =

Albanian politician

Iljas Agushi
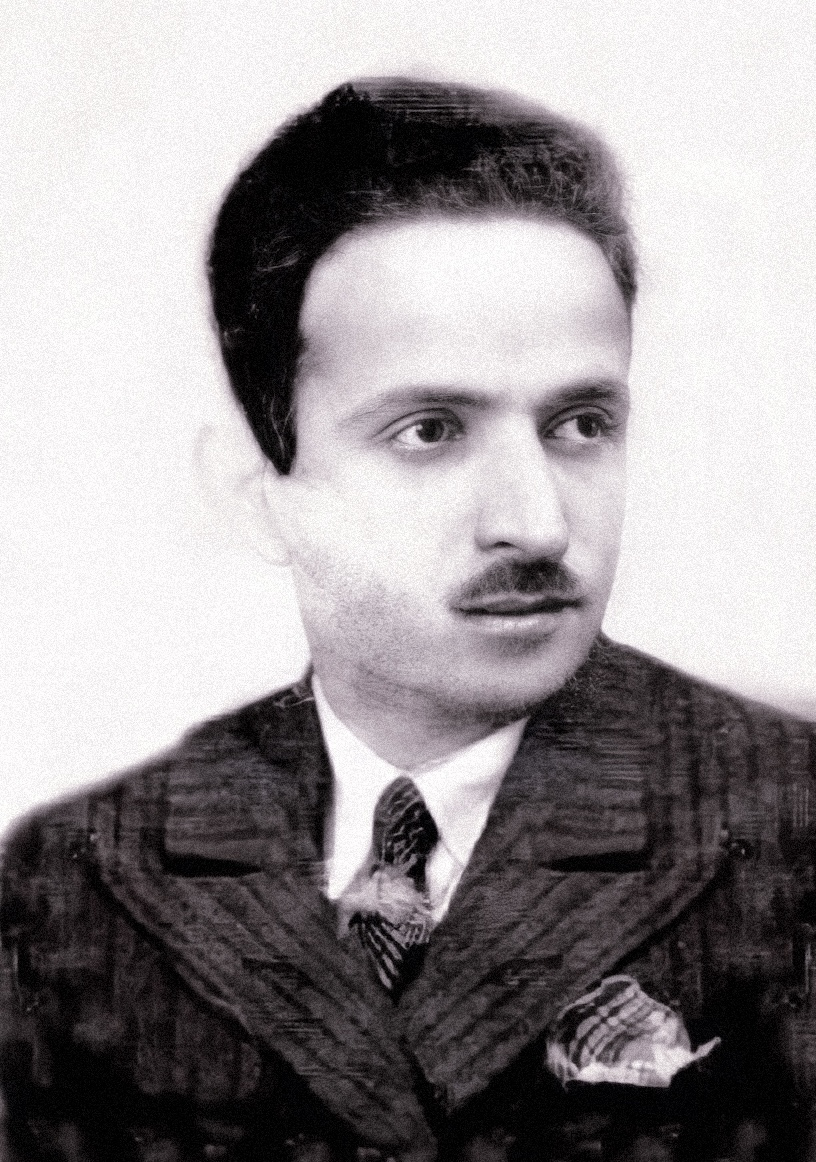

Deputy Prime Minister of Albania
- In office 12 February 1943 – 10 September 1943
- Preceded by: Eshref Frashëri (1920)
- Succeeded by: Myslym Peza

Personal details
- Born: 15 April 1882 Pristina, Ottoman Empire
- Died: October 1943 (aged 61) Tirana, Albania
- Profession: Politician

Iljaz Haxhí Agushi (15 April 1882 – October 1943) (Note: Different sources have listed the date of his assassination as 27 October, 28 October, or 29 October 1943.) was an Albanian politician. He served as Deputy Prime Minister of Albania from February to September 1943. He was assassinated in October 1943.

== Biography ==
Agushi was born on 15 April 1882 in Pristina, then part of the Ottoman Empire. His father, Xhemajl Agush Mehmeti (also known as Haxhí Xhemajl Aga), was an Albanian independence activist and member of the parliament. He received his primary education in Pristina before attending the Bursa Lyceum in Bursa. After receiving his education, Agushi began working at the Istanbul Post Office. There, he became involved with the Albanian Committee of Istanbul and the Committee "National Defense of Kosovo".

Agushi moved back to Pristina in the 1920s and became a tenant farmer. He was married and had four children; his wife died in 1936. He was also active in politics and led the Foundation of the Islamic Community of Pristina, in addition to working for the governing council of a Muslim organization in Skopje. Following the death of his father, Agushi won election to the Yugoslav National Assembly and served from 1939 to 1941. In April 1941, he led a protest of 30,000 people in response to the Italians installing a Serbian mayor as leader of Pristina. Agushi threatened a revolt if the mayor was not removed, and the Italians complied. During the Invasion of Yugoslavia by Nazi Germany, Agushi began organizing the new authorities while helping to remove Serbian officials. He became the Prefect of Pristina in 1941.

Agushi was appointed Minister of Public Works on 3 December 1941. He also served in the Parliament of Albania from 1942 to 1943. He advocated for the Unification of Albania and Kosovo and spoke at several rallies in February and March 1942, while also visiting Pristina with Prime Minister Mustafa Kruja in June 1942, which was the first time the "Albanian Prime Minister [had] set foot on Albanian soil in Kosovo." He became the new Deputy Prime Minister of Albania in early 1943 and served until that September. In September, following the capitulation of Italy, Agushi, as a member of the Council of Ministers, proclaimed the full independence of Albania and declared that the Provisional Executive Council would take over governance of the country.

Due to his relations with the Germans who occupied Yugoslavia, Agushi was viewed as a fascist and traitor by the Communist Party of Yugoslavia. Several members of the party, including former Royal Albanian Army commander Pjetër Cica and Fadil Hoxha, developed plans to kill Agushi. In October 1943, two assassins went to his house in Tirana and, as Agushi was about to open the door, shouted, "In the name of the people, you are sentenced to death". They then shot him three times, killing him, before fleeing. Agushi was age 61 at his death. His funeral was held in Pristina and attended by many Albanian political figures, as well as 200 imams. The imam Mulla Idris spoke at the funeral and called Agushi a martyr, the "Sheikh of the Albanian nation" and "the most peaceful man I knew ... [who] tried to reunite Albania". During the period of communist rule in Albania, Agushi was described negatively in literature. In more recent years, he has been viewed as a patriot and statesman of the country.
