= Tefik Mborja =

Albanian politician and lawyer

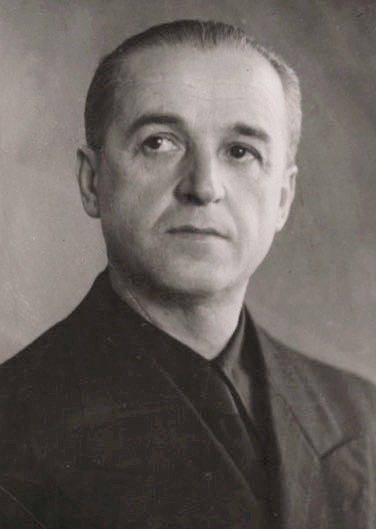
- Born: Tefik Selim Mborja; 6 November 1891; Mborje, Vilayet of Monastir, Ottoman Empire (modern-day Albania)
- Died: 1 July 1954 (aged 62)
- Occupations: Politician, diplomat
- Known for: Albanian Fascist Party

Tefik Selim Mborja (6 November 1891 – 1 July 1954) was an Albanian politician and lawyer. He served as the general secretary of the Albanian Fascist Party during the Second World War.

== Biography ==
Tefik Mborja was born in 1888, in Mborje, Vilayet of Monastir, Ottoman Empire (today Albania). Mborja was a member of parliament during the interbellum years. A staunch opponent of Ahmet Zogu, he supported Fan Noli. Mborja was served as Noli's representative in Rome from 1924. He was assigned to establish the diplomatic relations with Soviet Union, and for this reason he communicated with Soviet representative in Rome Konstantin Juranev. In Italy, he befriended the family of Count Galeazzo Ciano. He studied jurisprudence in Rome.

With the invasion of Albania by Italian forces in 1939, Mborja was appointed new Prefect of the province of Korçë by the Albanian Provisional Committee. When the Albanian Fascist Party was founded within a month of the invasion, Mborja was appointed general secretary of the party by Victor Emmanuel III. The main criteria behind his nomination were the links with the Ciano family that he had cultivated in the 1920s.

As the general secretary of the Albanian Fascist Party Mborja was included in the Albanian government as an ex-officio minister. Mborja was able to exercise a certain degree over political influence over government policies through his position in the government. However the Italian fascists retained veto rights over the actions of the Albanian party, and Mborja's work was supervised by Giovanni Giro (inspector-general of the party and a close associate of Benito Mussolini). In theory, according to his official biography, Mborja was supposed to be included in the leadership of the Italian Fascist Party, although was unclear in what function. On May 29, 1939, he was appointed as member of the Italian Chamber of Fasces and Corporations as well as the Central Council of Corporative Economy.

He was arrested in December 1944 by Albanian Communists and sentenced with 20 years by the Special Court of Spring 1945. He was poisoned while in prison and died in 1954.
