= Maliq Bushati =

Albanian politician and Axis collaborator; Prime Minister of Albania (1943)

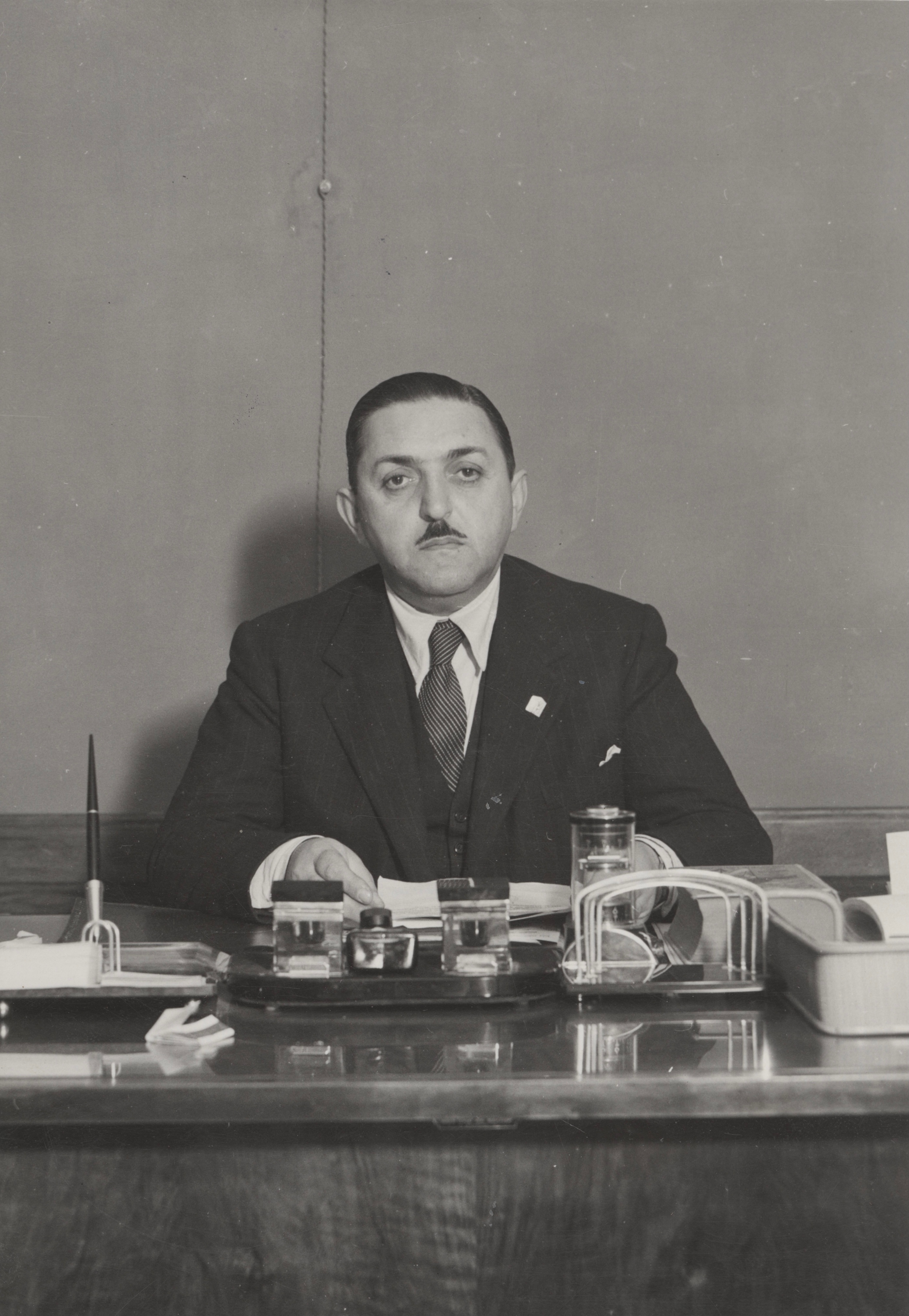

18th Prime Minister of Albania
- In office 13 February 1943 – 12 May 1943
- Monarch: Victor Emmanuel III
- Preceded by: Ekrem Libohova
- Succeeded by: Ekrem Libohova

Interior secretary minister of Albania
- In office 12 April 1939 – 3 December 1941
- Preceded by: Zef Kadarja
- Succeeded by: Mustafa Kruja

Personal details
- Born: 8 February 1890 Shkodër, Scutari Vilayet, Ottoman Empire
- Died: 20 February 1946 (aged 56) Albania
- Cause of death: Execution by firing squad
- Party: Albanian Fascist Party
- Profession: Prime Minister

Maliq Bushati (8 February 1890 – 20 February 1946) was an Albanian politician who served as the 18th prime minister of Albania from February 1943 to May 1943 as an Axis collaborator. Following the Italian invasion of Albania in 1939, Bushati served as Interior Minister from 1939 to 1941 under the government of Shefqt Vërlaci. Along with two other Axis collaborators Lef Nosi and father Anton Harapi, he was sentenced to death by communist Albania.

== Biography ==
Maliq was born in Shkodër on 8 February 1890 to Hyssen Beg in the Alibegaj branch of the Bushati family. His father followed military education at the local school and in Istanbul afterwards. He served with the rank of binbashi in Vilayet of Salonica during the first years of the 20th century, only to die suddenly at a young age in 1903.

This is how Bernd Jürgen Fuscher described some of Maliq Bushati’s WW2 activities:

“Although Bushati had counted as a long-time opponent of Zog's, the two had corresponded since the invasion, something about which the Italians were certainly unaware. Albanian socialist historians maintain that Bushati was also a leader of the BK. The Italians were being forced to accept people who had little interest in maintaining Italian domination in Albania. Aware of this, Bushati, who also became provisional head of the National Fascist Party of Albania, was carefully watched. His vice-premier was the Kosovar Iliaz Agushi, who had served a minister of the new territories in 1941. As minister of the interior, the Italians finally succeeded in recruiting the Mirdita chief Gjon Marka Gjoni, who would demonstrate considerable ruthlessness in his pursuit of the partisans. But the Bushati government lasted only a few weeks. Problems between the premier and Marka Gjoni began immediately, principally with regard to the handling of resistance in the south. The government, composed primarily of northerners, had less chance than the previous two governments of convincing the southerners to cease their resistance, so the minister of the interior favored abandoning persuasion for force. Bushati disagreed. Bushati had also appealed to the Italian authorities to release many citizens of Korça who had been interned in the concentration camp at Durrës. The Italians refused. Bushati further annoyed the Italians by frequent complaints about Italian atrocities in southern Albania against the partisans.”

=== Cabinet of Maliq Bushati (1943) ===
- Maliq Bushati – Prime Minister
- Ekrem Vlora – Foreign Affairs
- Xhafer Deva – Interior
- Tefik Mborja – Justice
- Kolë Thaçi – Finance
- Dhimitër Berati – National Economy
- Mark Gjon Marku – Education
- Gjergj Bubani – Public Works
- Ndoc Çoba – Agriculture
- Mihal Zallari – Communications

Political offices
Preceded by Eqrem Bej Libohova	Prime Minister of Albania; 1943	Succeeded by Eqrem Bej Libohova
