= Kingdom of Albania in personal union with Italy =

1939–1943 occupation during World War II

Coordinates: 41.5350°N 19.8200°E

Kingdom of Albania Mbretëria e Shqipërisë (Albanian) Regno d'Albania (Italian)
- 1939–1943
- Flag Royal coat of arms
- Motto: FERT (Motto for the House of Savoy)
- Anthem: Himni i Flamurit ("Hymn to the Flag") Royal anthem: Marcia Reale d'Ordinanza ("Royal March of Ordinance")
- The Italian protectorate of Albania in 1942
- Status: In personal union with Kingdom of Italy (de jure) puppet government of Fascist Italy (de facto)
- Capital: Tirana
- Common languages: Albanian; Italian
- Demonym: Albanian
- Government: Constitutional monarchy under a Fascist dictatorship
- King
  - 1939–1943: Victor Emmanuel III
- Lieutenant-General of the King
  - 1939–1943: Francesco Jacomoni
  - 1943: Alberto Pariani
- Prime Minister
  - 1939–1941: Shefqet Vërlaci
  - 1941–1943: Mustafa Merlika-Kruja
  - 1943: Ekrem Libohova
  - 1943: Maliq Bushati
  - 1943: Ekrem Libohova
- Legislature: Parliament
- History
  - Established: 12 April 1939
  - Enlargement: 10 July 1941
  - Italian capitulation: 8 September 1943

Area
- 1939: 28,748 km^{2} (11,100 sq mi)
- 1940-1943: 42,462 km^{2} (16,395 sq mi)

Population
  - 1939: 1,063,893
  - 1940-1943: 1,701,463
- Currency: Franga (1939–1941); Italian lira (1941–1943)
Preceded by
1939: Albanian Kingdom
1941: Zeta Banovina
Vardar Banovina
Succeeded by
German occupation of Albania

The Kingdom of Albania was in personal union with the Kingdom of Italy (Fascist Italy) following the Italian invasion of Albania in 1939 and until the German occupation in September 1943. It is also referred to as Italian Albania or Greater Albania, and was a state controlled by Fascist Italy. The monarch was Italian King, Victor Emmanuel III, who was represented in Albania by Italian governors. During this time, Albania ceased to exist as an independent country and became an autonomous part of the Italian Empire.

In the Treaty of London during World War I, the Triple Entente had promised territories in Albania to Italy as a reward for fighting against the Central Powers. Italian Fascists claimed that Albanians were ethnically linked to Italians through association with the prehistoric populations, and that the major influence exerted by the Roman and Venetian empires over Albania gave Italy the right to possess it. In addition, several hundred thousand ethnic Albanians had already been absorbed into southern Italy, which was used to justify annexation as a measure that would unite all Albanians into one state. Italy supported Albanian irredentism, directed against the predominantly Albanian-populated Kosovo in Yugoslavia; Albanian nationalists also sought Italian support against Epirus in Greece, particularly in the border area of Chameria, but didn't receive it. Seeing Albanians as inferior, Italy sought to move Italians into Albania and turn it into a colony.

The Italian and German occupiers were responsible for 28,000 dead, 12,600 wounded, 43,000 interned in concentration camps, 61,000 homes burned, 850 villages destroyed in Albania.

== History ==
=== Pre-invasion: Italy's influence and aims in Albania ===
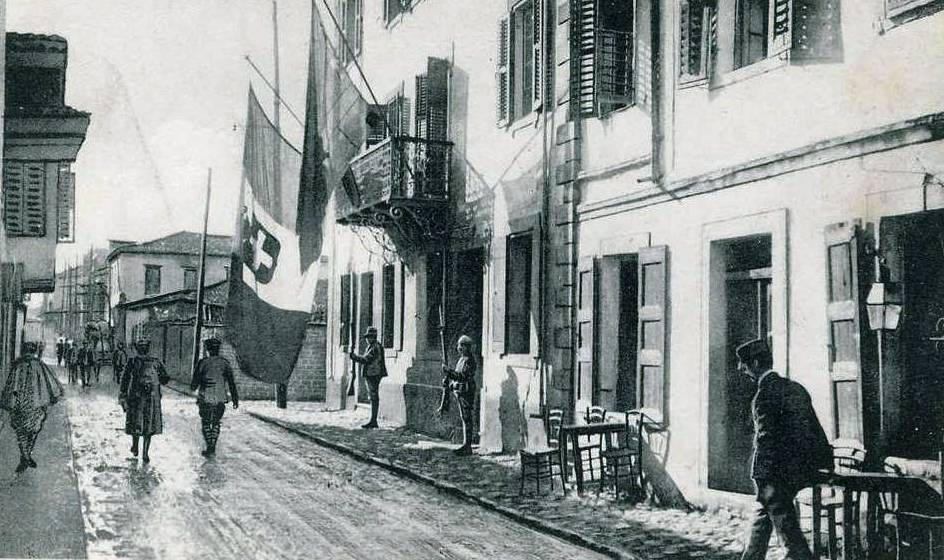
Italian soldiers in Vlorë, Albania, during World War I. The tricolour flag of Italy bearing the Savoy royal shield is shown hanging alongside an Albanian flag from the balcony of the Italian headquarters.

Prior to direct intervention in World War I, the Kingdom of Italy occupied the port of Vlorë in Albania in December 1914. Upon entering the war, Italy spread its occupation to region of southern Albania beginning in the autumn 1916. Italian forces in 1916 recruited Albanian irregulars to serve alongside them. Italy with permission of the Allied command, occupied Northern Epirus on 23 August 1916, forcing the Greek Army to withdraw its occupation forces from there. In June 1917, Italy proclaimed central and southern Albania as a protectorate of Italy while Northern Albania was allocated to the states of Serbia and Montenegro. By 31 October 1918, French and Italian forces expelled the Austro-Hungarian Army from Albania. After World War I ended, Italy withdrew its military forces on 2 September 1920 from Albania as a result of domestic crisis (biennio rosso), foreign pressure and a rebellion in Vlora. However, it annexed the island of Saseno and continued to have special interest in Albania.

In the 1920s, the Italian Fascist regime had politically and economically penetrated and dominated Albania during Zog's rule and was planning for annexation of Albania years prior to the event. Albania came under strong Italian influence after the signing of the Treaties of Tirana of 1926 and 1927. Under Zog, Albania's economy was dependent on multiple financial loans given from Italy since 1931.

In August 1933, Mussolini placed strict demands on Zog in exchange for Italy's continued support of Albania, including demands that all new appointments to leading positions in the Albanian government had to have received an "Italian education"; that an Italian expert was in the future to be in all Albanian government ministries; that Italy would take control of Albania's military – including its fortifications; that British officers that were training Albania's gendarmerie be replaced by Italian officers; and that Albania must annul all of its existing commercial treaties with other countries and make no new agreements without the approval of the Italian government; and that Albania sign a commercial convention that would make Italy Albania's "most favoured country" in trade. In 1934 when Albania did not deliver its scheduled payment of one loan to Italy, Italian warships arrived off the coast of Albania to intimidate Albania to submit to Italian goals in the region. However, the British opposed Italy's actions and under pressure, Italy backed down and claimed that the naval exercise was merely a "friendly visit".

On 25 August 1937, Italian foreign minister Count Ciano wrote in his diary of Italy's relations with Albania in the following: "We must create stable centres of Italian influence there. Who knows what the future may have in store? We must be ready to seize opportunities which will present themselves. We are not going to withdraw this time, as we did in 1920. In the south [of Italy] we have absorbed several hundred thousand Albanians. Why shouldn't the same thing happen on the other side of the entrance to the Adriatic.". On 26 March 1938, Ciano wrote in his diary of annexing Albania like Germany did with Austria shortly prior: "A report from Jacomoni on the situation in Albania. Our penetration is becoming steadily more intense and more organic. The programme which I traced after my visit is being carried out without a hitch. I am wondering whether the general situation – particularly the Anschluss [with Austria] – does not permit us to take a step forward towards the more complete domination of this country, which will be ours." and days later on 4 April of that year wrote "We must gradually underline the protectorate element of our relations with Albania".

=== Invasion and the establishment of the puppet regime ===
Victor Emmanuel III of Italy, King of Albania from 1939 to 1943

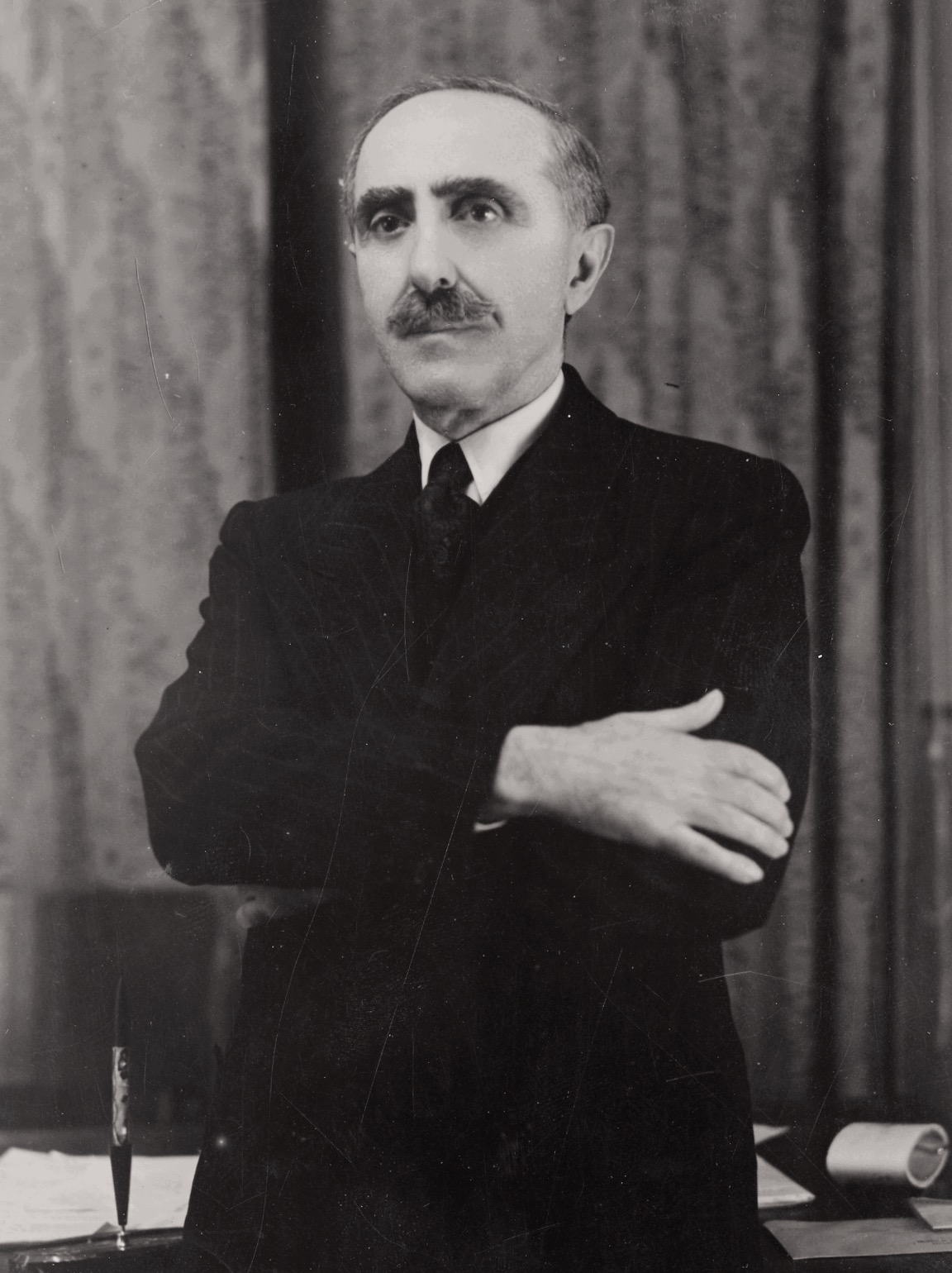
Shefqet Vërlaci, Prime Minister of Albania from 1939 to 1941

In spite of Albania's long-standing alliance with Italy, on 7 April 1939 Italian troops invaded Albania, five months before the start of the Second World War. The Albanian armed resistance proved ineffective against the Italians and, after a short defense, the country was occupied. On 9 April 1939 the Albanian king, Zog I fled to Greece. Although Albania had been under strong Italian influence since 1927, Italy's political leader, Benito Mussolini wanted direct control over the country to increase his and Italy's prestige, provide a response to Germany's annexation of Austria and occupation of Czechoslovakia, and to have firm control over Albania to station large forces of the Italian military for future operations involving Yugoslavia and Greece.

"The Kosovars are 850,000 Albanians, strong of body, firm in spirit, and enthusiastic about the idea of a Union with their Homeland. Apparently, the Serbians are terrified of them. Today one must ... chloroform the Yugoslavians. But later on one must adopt a politics of deep interest in Kosovo. This will help to keep alive in the Balkans an irredentist problem which will polarize the attention of the Albanians themselves and be a knife at the back of Yugoslavia..."

— Galeazzo Ciano, Mussolini's son-in-law, the Italian Minister of Foreign Affairs, speaking of Albanian claims to Kosovo as valuable to Italy's objectives.

Albania became an Italian protectorate subordinated to Italian interests, along the lines of the German Protectorate of Bohemia and Moravia. Albania officially became part of the Italian Empire and Victor Emmanuel III was proclaimed king of Albania, creating a personal union with Italy; he was represented in Tirana by a viceroy. A customs union was created, and Rome took over Albanian foreign policy. Although officially under Italian rule, the Albanians controlled the region and were encouraged to open Albanian language schools, which had been banned by the Yugoslav government. The Italians also gave the inhabitants Albanian citizenship and allowed them to fly the Albanian Flag. The Albanian armed forces were subsumed into the Italian military, Italian advisers were placed inside all levels of the Albanian administration, and the country was fascisticized with the establishment of an Albanian Fascist Party and its attendant organizations, modelled after the Italian prototype. The Albanian Fascist Party was a branch of the National Fascist Party of Italy, members of the Albanian Fascist Party took an oath to obey the orders of the Duce of Fascism, Mussolini. The italianization of Albania was one of Mussolini's plans.

While Victor Emmanuel ruled as king, Shefqet Vërlaci served as the prime minister. Vërlaci controlled the day-to-day activities of the Italian protectorate. On 3 December 1941, Shefqet Vërlaci was replaced as prime minister by Mustafa Merlika-Kruja. The country's natural resources too came under direct control of Italy. All petroleum resources in Albania went through Agip, Italy's state petroleum company.

Albania was important culturally and historically to the nationalist aims of the Italian Fascists, as the territory of Albania had long been part of the Roman Empire, even prior to the annexation of northern Italy by the Romans. Later, during the High Middle Ages some coastal areas (like Durazzo) had been influenced and owned by Italian powers, chiefly the Kingdom of Naples and the Republic of Venice for many years (cf. Albania Veneta). The Italian Fascist regime legitimized its claim to Albania through studies proclaiming the racial affinity of Albanians and Italians, especially as opposed to the Slavic Yugoslavs. Italian Fascists claimed that Albanians were linked through ethnic heritage to Italians, not to Slavs, and that the major influence exhibited by the Roman and Venetian empires over Albania justified Italy's right to possess it.

=== Albanian irredentism ===
==== Italy's pro-Albanian and anti-Serb policy against Yugoslavia ====
Italy also attempted to legitimize and win public support for its rule over Albania by supporting Albanian irredentism, directed against the predominantly Albanian-populated Kosovo in the Kingdom of Yugoslavia. Italy financed Albanian figures and groups in Kosovo, developing a strategy which promoted cultural and nationalist propaganda.

As such, in April 1941, what is now South and Middle Kosovo became "New Albania" under Italian control. During the occupation, coercive measures against Serbs in the region were documented and Serbs were killed or expelled from the Italian-occupied areas.

==== Italy's anti-Albanian and pro-Greek policy against Greece ====
Albanian nationalists also tried to get Italian support against Epirus in Greece, particularly the border area of Chameria, inhabited by the Cham Albanian minority, but largely failed. During the Greco-Italian War, Albanian soldiers proved disloyal to Italy, being treacherous through acts of sabotage or defection to the Greek side. Albanian units also deserted or fled en masse in the face of Greek troops, causing Italy to observe an alleged "Albanian betrayal". On the other hand, the Italians considered the Greeks to have been admirable enemies for repelling the numerically greater Italian army.

The Italian military was staunchly anti-Albanian, considering all Albanians as enemies and exhibiting extremely racist views against them. Italians also argued that Greeks wouldn't accept to be ruled by people whom they considered as "culturally inferior"; both Italians and Greeks agreed on this supposed cultural inferiority of the Albanians. The Italians also found the region, which the Albanians claimed, to have been almost completely Greek. The Germans also opposed the move for the same reasons, and also because they were opposed to any territorial reduction of the Hellenic state.

=== Albania at war ===
Italian troops disembarking from ships, April 1939

Italian troops entering Durazzo

The Greek counteroffensive (13 November 1940-7 April 1941) during the Greco-Italian War

Strategically, control of Albania gave Italy an important beachhead in the Balkans: not only did it complete Italian control of the Strait of Otranto and the entrance to the Adriatic Sea, it could be used to invade either Yugoslavia (in tandem with another thrust via Venezia Giulia) or Greece.

The Corporative Council of the Albanian Fascist Party, a quasi-statal organization, issued a directive on 16 June 1940, shortly after Italy's declarations of war against Britain and France, that stated that "The Kingdom of Albania considers itself at war with all nations against which Italy is at war – at present or in the future."

In October 1940, during the Greco-Italian War, Albania served as a staging-area for Italian dictator Benito Mussolini's unsuccessful invasion of Greece. Mussolini planned to invade Greece and other countries like Yugoslavia in the area to give Italy territorial control of most of the Mediterranean Sea coastline, as part of the Fascists' objective of creating the objective of Mare Nostrum ("Our Sea") in which Italy would dominate the Mediterranean. But the Albanian army under the command of colonel (later general) Prenk Pervizi abandoned the Italians in combat, causing a major unraveling of their lines. The Albanian army believed to be the cause of the betrayal was removed from the front. The Colonel Pervizi and his staff of officials was isolated in the mountains of Puka and Shkodra to the North. This was the first action of revolt against the Italian occupation.

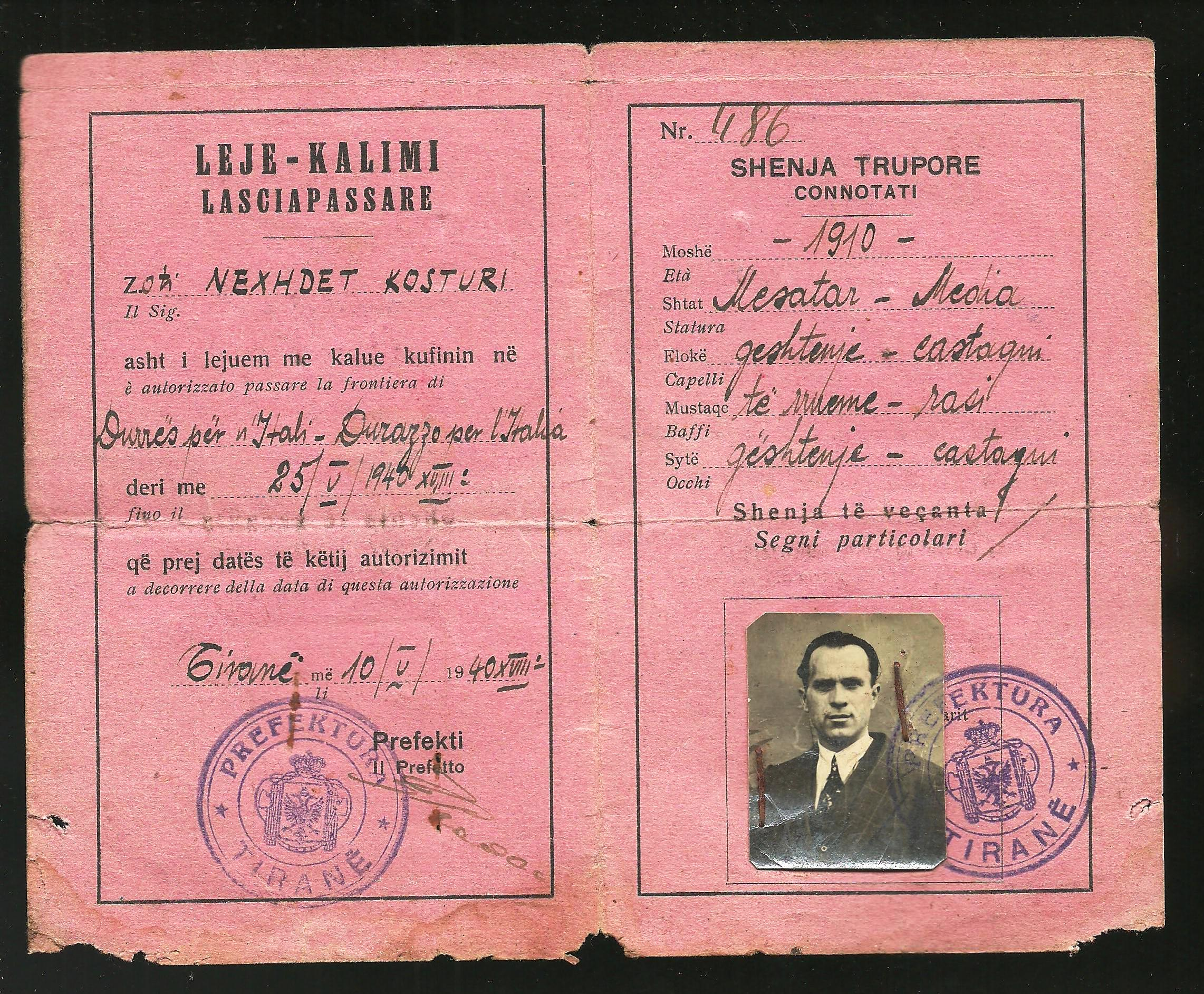
1940 Albanian Kingdom Laissez Passer issued for traveling to Italy after the invasion of 1939

But, soon after the Italian invasion, the Greeks counter-attacked and a sizable portion of Albania was in Greek hands (including the cities of Gjirokastër and Korçë). In April 1941, Greece capitulated after an overwhelming German invasion. All of Albania returned to Italian control, which was also extended to most of Greece, which was jointly occupied by Italy, Germany and Bulgaria.

After the fall of Yugoslavia and Greece in April 1941, the Italian government began negotiations with Germany, Bulgaria, and the newly established client state, the Independent State of Croatia, on defining their borders. In April Mussolini called for the borders of Albania to be expanded – including annexing Montenegro into Albania that would have an autonomous government within Albania, and expanding Albania's border eastwards, though not as far as the Vardar river as some had proposed – citing that Ohrid should be left to the Slavic Macedonians, regardless of whether Vardar Macedonia would become an independent state or be annexed by Bulgaria. However the Italian government changed its positions on the border throughout April, later supporting the annexation of Ohrid while giving the territory lying directly outside of Ohrid (including the sacred birthplace of Saint Clement) to the Slavic Macedonians. After a period of negotiations Italy's new Balkan borders – including Albania's new borders, were declared by royal decree on 7 June 1941.

After the Italian capitulation in September 1943, the country was occupied by the Germans until the end of the war.

== Persecution ==
=== Against Serbs and Jews ===
Around 200 Albanian Jews and 400 Jewish refugees resided in Albania proper prior to World War II. Albanian Jews were generally protected but faced some restrictions. Foreign Jews were placed into concentration camps. The Jewish population of Kosovo fared comparatively worse as Italian authorities turned them over to the Germans where they were murdered or sent to camps in Albania. Others were taken to Albanian cities where the local population protected them. See The Holocaust in Albania.

Kosovar Albanians collaborated with the Axis powers who promised them a Greater Albania. This was seen as a better alternative to the repressive measures instilled by Serbian politicians during the interwar period. In June 1942 Prime Minister Mustafa Kruja stated that Serbs would be sent to concentration camps or killed. Between 70,000 and 100,000 Kosovar Serbs were transferred to concentration camps in Pristina and Mitrovica or expelled to Serbia proper, in order to Albanianize the province, and 72,000 Albanians were settled in Kosovo from Albania. During the occupation, the population was subject to forced labour, torture, destruction of private property, destruction and damaging of cultural and historical buildings and graveyards. The expulsion of Serbs proved problematic, as they had performed important functions in the region, and been running most of the businesses, mills, tanneries, and public utilities, and been responsible for most of the useful agricultural production. According to Serbian sources, it is estimated that the Vulnetari and other paramilitaries murdered up to 10,000 Serbs and Montenegrins in Kosovo.

=== Against Albanians ===
Growing Albanian resistance to Italian rule led to an increase in repressive and punitive measures against the Albanian population. General Alessandro Pirzio Biroli gave his men a carte blanche (unlimited discretionary power to act) against Albanians, including civilians. From 14–18 July 1943, the Italian army conducted the "massacre of Mallakasha" in villages surrounding the town of Mallakastër. The army forces destroyed 80 Albanian villages and killed hundreds of civilians.

In total, the Italian and German occupiers were responsible for 28,000 dead, 12,600 wounded, 43,000 interned in concentration camps, 61,000 homes burned, 850 villages destroyed.

== Economy ==
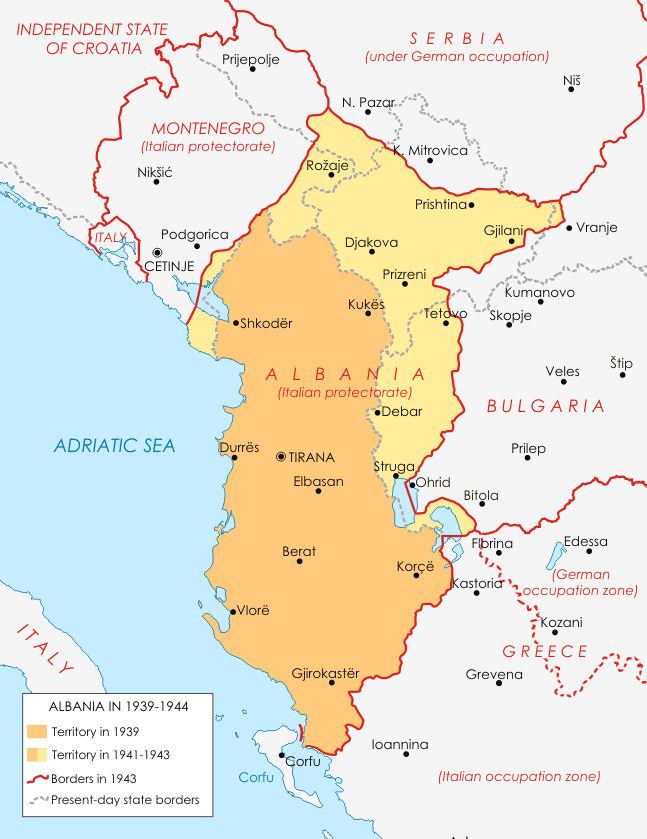
Albania during World War II

Upon the occupation of Albania and installation of a new government, the economies of Albania and Italy were connected through a customs union that resulted in the removal of most trade restrictions. Through a tariff union, the Italian tariff system was put in place in Albania. Due to the expected economic losses in Albania from the alteration in tariff policy, the Italian government provided Albania 15 million Albanian leks each year in compensation. Italian customs laws were to apply in Albania and only Italy alone could conclude treaties with third parties. Italian capital was allowed to dominate the Albanian economy. As a result, Italian companies were allowed to hold monopolies in the exploitation of Albanian natural resources.

== Administrative division ==
The Italians adopted the existing Albanian system of prefectures (Italian: prefetture). In line with the administrative structure of the rest of Italy these were also called provinces (Italian: provincia). However, unlike Italy the Albanian sub-prefecture (Italian: sotto prefetture) was retained. There were initially 10 prefectures. Under this was 30 sub-prefectures and 23 municipalities (Italian: municipalità). Each Prefecture was run by a Prefect located in the city of the same name.

In 1941, following the dismemberment of Yugoslavia, new prefectures were created in regions annexed to Albania (upper Black Drin, entire Metohija, central Kosovo). Newly formed prefectures were centered in Debar, Pristina and Prizren, and by the end of the same year another prefecture was created, centered in Peja. New prefectures were also divided into sub-prefectures. Also Ulcinj was added to Scutari prefecture as sub-prefecture.

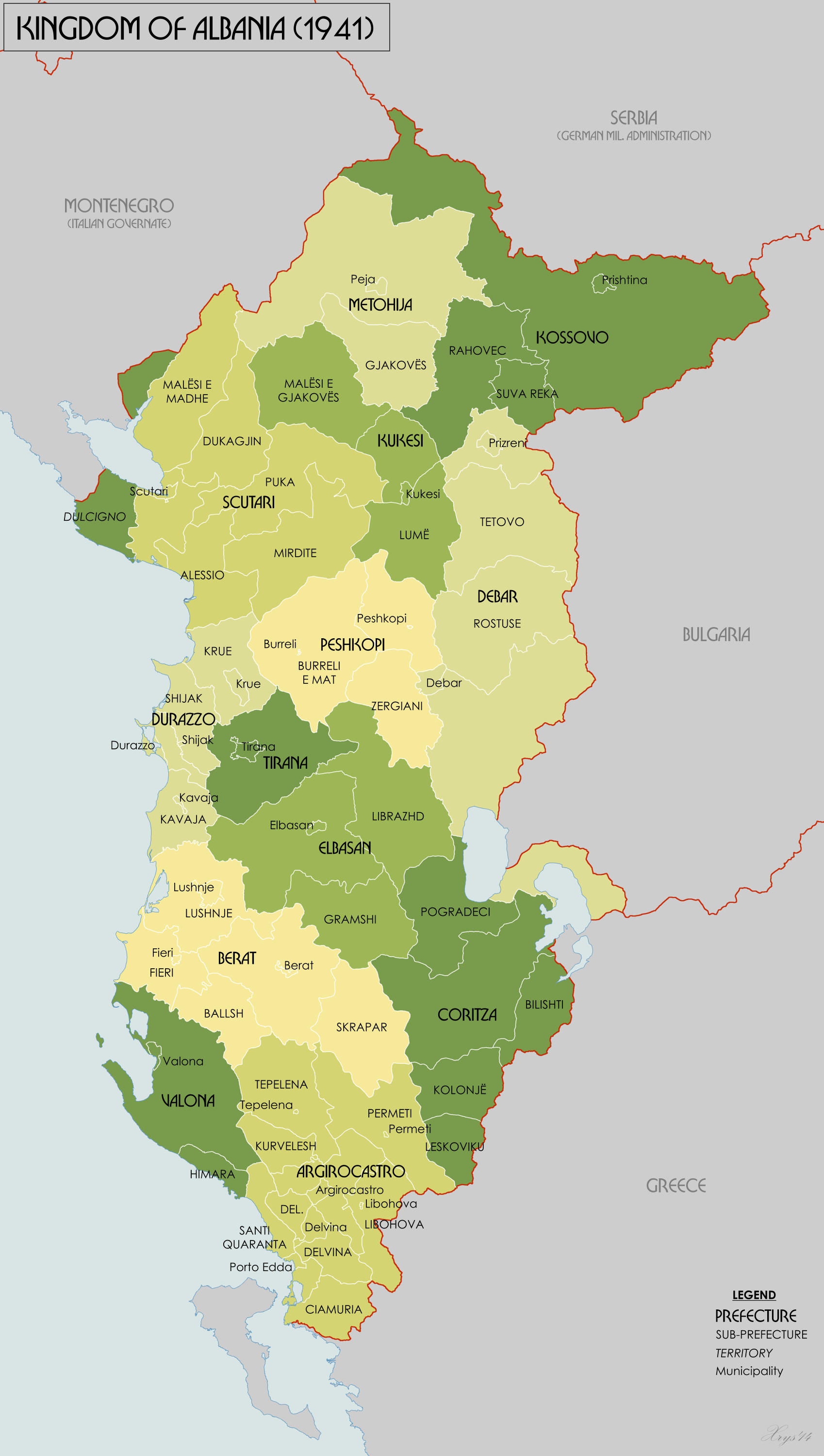
Administrative divisions in 1941

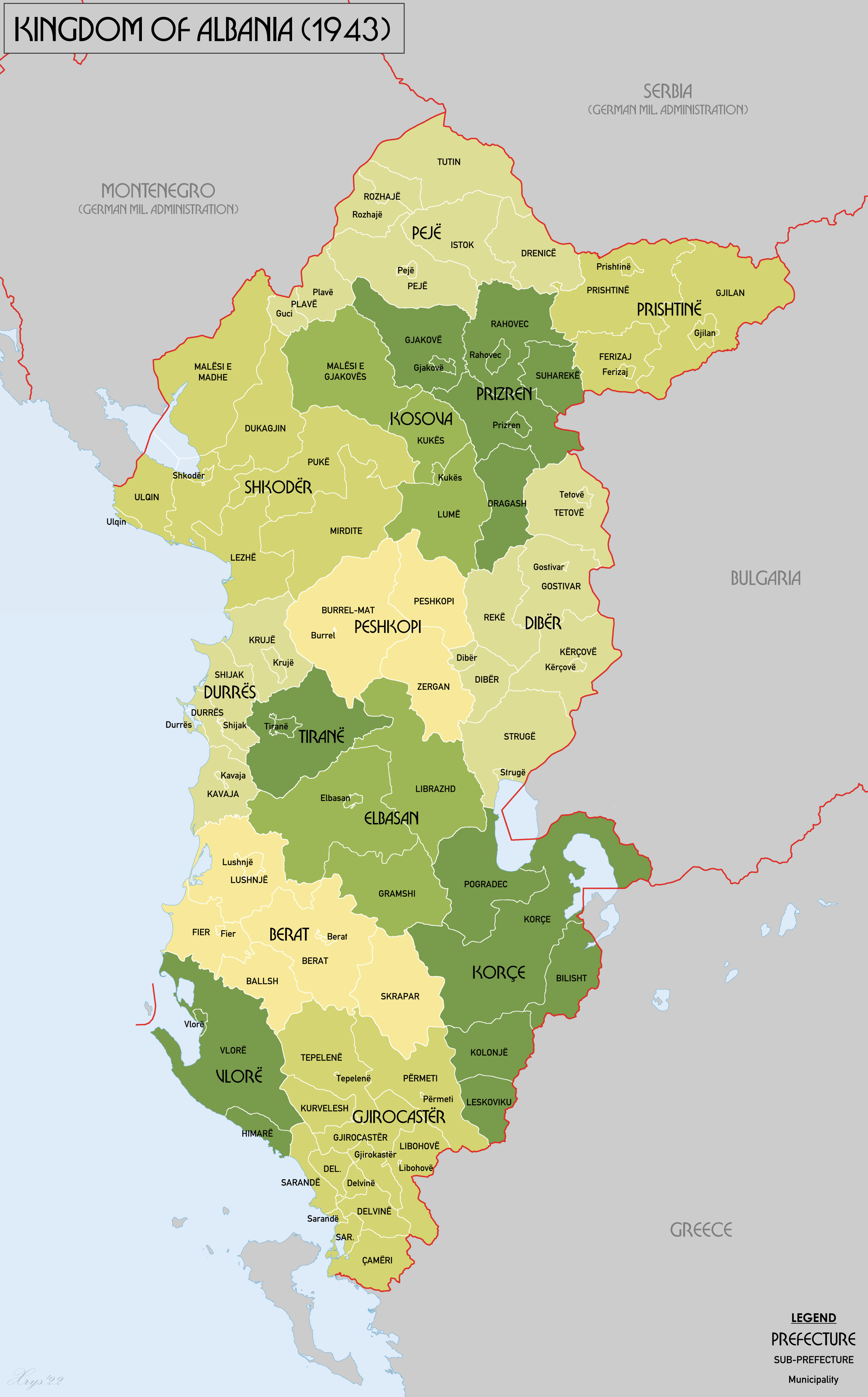
Administrative divisions by 1943

Prefecture	Sub-prefectures	Municipalities
Berat	Fieri; Lushnje; Ballsh; Skrapar	Berat; Fieri; Lushnje
Peshkopi	Burreli e Mat; Zerqan	Peshkopi; Burrel
Durazzo	Kavaja; Krue; Shijak	Durazzo; Kavaja; Shijak; Krue
Elbasan	Librazhd; Gramshi	Elbasan
Argirocastro	Ciamuria; Delvina; Kurvelesh; Libohova; Permeti; Tepelena; Santi Quaranta	Argirocastro; Permeti; Tepelena; Porto Edda; Delvina
Coritza	Bilishti; Kolonjë; Leskoviku; Pogradeci	None
Kukesi	Lumë; Malësi e Gjakovës	Kukesi
Scutari	Alessio; Dukagjin; Dulcigno; Malësi e Madhe; Mirdite; Puka	Scutari
Valona	Himara	Valona
Tirana	None	Tirana
Debar	Rostuse; Tetovo	Debar
Pristina	Ferizaj; Gjilan	Pristina
Prizren	Rahovec; Suva Reka	Prizren
Peja	Istog; Plav	Peja

== See also ==
- Albanian Fascist Militia
- Albanian Fascist Party
- Balli Kombëtar
- Greater Albania
- Italian war crimes § Albania
- Italian colonists in Albania
- Italian invasion of Albania

== Bibliography ==
- Fischer, Bernd Jürgen (1999). Albania at War, 1939–1945. C. Hurst & Co. Publishers. ISBN 978-1-85065-531-2.
- Hibbert, Reginald (1991). Albania's National Liberation Struggle: The Bitter Victory. Pinter Publishers. ISBN 978-0-86187-109-4.
- Pearson, Owen (2006b). Albania in the Twentieth Century, A History: Volume II: Albania in Occupation and War, 1939–45. London: I. B. Tauris. ISBN 1-84511-104-4.
- Pearson, Owen (2007). Albania in the Twentieth Century, A History: 3 Volume Set. I. B. Tauris. ISBN 978-1-84511-016-1.
- Rodogno, Davide (2006). Fascism's European Empire: Italian Occupation During the Second World War. New York: Cambridge University Press. ISBN 978-0-521-84515-1.
- Salimbeni, Lorenzo (2008). "L'occupazione italiana del Kosovo nella seconda guerra mondiale" (PDF). Italia contemporanea. 251: 299–319. Archived (PDF) from the original on 28 June 2024.
