= Albanian Fascist Party =

Albanian fascist political party

Albanian Fascist Party Partia Fashiste Shqiptare
- Abbreviation: PFSh
- Leader: Tefik Mborja
- Founded: June 2, 1939
- Dissolved: July 27, 1943
- Headquarters: Abdi Toptani street, Tirana
- Newspaper: Fashizmi
- Youth wing: Djelmnia e Liktorit Shqiptar (GLA)
- Paramilitary wing: Albanian Fascist Militia
- Membership (1940): 13,500
- Ideology: Fascism; Albanian nationalism Albanian irredentism Italophilia; Anti-Serb sentiment Anti-Greek sentiment
- Political position: Far-right
- National affiliation: National Fascist Party

The Albanian Fascist Party (Albanian: Partia Fashiste Shqiptare, or PFSh) was a fascist organisation active during World War II which held nominal power in Albania from 1939, when the country was invaded by Italy, until 1943, when Italy capitulated to the Allies. Afterwards, Albania fell under German occupation, and the PFSh was replaced by the Balli Kombëtar.

== History ==
=== Establishment ===
On 25 March 1939, Italian dictator Benito Mussolini gave Albanian King Zog I an ultimatum demanding that he accept an Italian military protectorate over Albania. Zog refused, and the Italians invaded on 7 April and deposed him. Zog fled the country. The Italians re-established the Albanian state as the protectorate of the Kingdom of Italy.

On 11 April, Italian Minister of Foreign Affairs Galeazzo Ciano arranged for a group of well-known Albanians to "request" the formation of the Albanian Fascist Party (Albanian: Partia Fashiste e Shqipërisë, or PFSh). On 23 April, Achille Starace, the Secretary of the National Fascist Party (Italian: Partito Nazionale Fascista, or PNF), accompanied by two Regia Marina warships, arrived in Albania to officially announce the establishment of the PFSh, which was founded on 2 June. However, it did not receive its constitution until 6 June, and was not presented with an organised directorate and central council until March 1940.

=== Italian rule ===
The PFSh enacted laws that prevented Albanian Jews from joining, and excluded them from professions such as education. Composed of ethnic Albanians and Italian colonists in Albania, the party existed as a branch of the PNF, and members were required to swear an oath of loyalty to Mussolini. All Albanians serving the Italian occupiers were required to join, and it became the only legal political party in the country.

== List of ministers secretaries ==
No.	Portrait	Name (Birth–Death)	Took office	Left office
Albanian Fascist Party
1		Tefik Mborja (1891–1954)	1939	1941
2		Jup Kazazi (1905–1946)	1941	1943
3		Kol Bib Mirakaj (1899–1968)	1943	
Guard of Great Albania
4		Maliq Bushati (1890–1946)	1943	
5		Ekrem Libohova (1882–1948)	1943	

== "Geraca" (rank insignia) of the Albanian Fascist Party ==
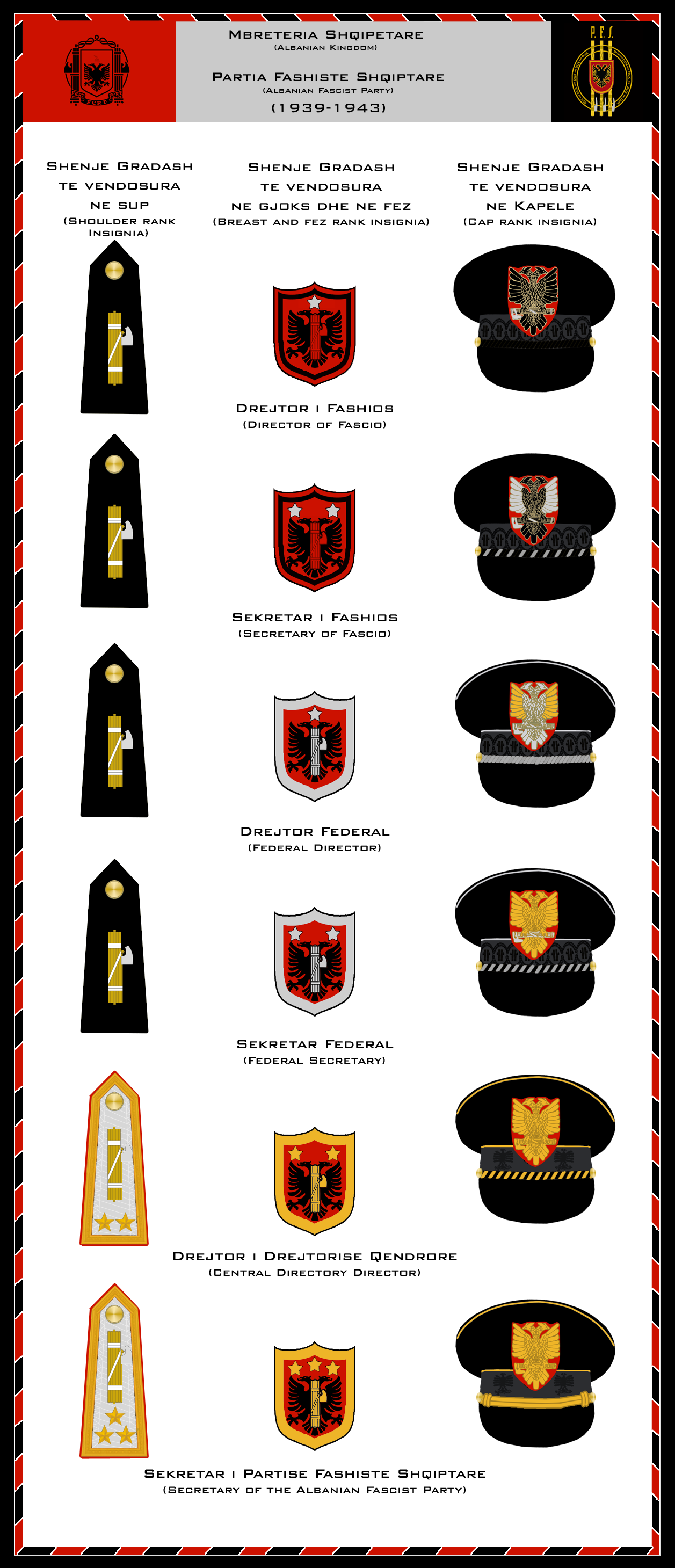

== See also ==
- World War II in Albania
- Albanian Lictor Youth
- Albanian Fascist Militia
