= 31st Kuvendi =

Legislature of Albania since 2021

Thirty-first Legislature of Albania Legjislatura e tridhjetë e një e Shqipërisë
- XXXI Legislature; X Pluralist Legislature

Type
- Type: Unicameral
- Term limits: Four years

History
- Founded: 10 September 2021
- Disbanded: 8 July 2025
- Preceded by: 30th Legislature
- Succeeded by: 32nd Legislature

Leadership
- Chairman of the Parliament: Elisa Spiropali, PS
- Prime Minister: Edi Rama

Structure
- Seats: 140 deputies
- Political groups: Government (76): PS (76); Opposition (64): PD (42); DJATHTAS (4); KEA (4); PL (3); PSD (3); PDIU (2); PR (1); PAA (1); PBDNJ (1); LZHK (1); PM (1); Independent (1)

Website
- www.parlament.al

The Thirty-first Legislature of Albania (Albanian: Legjislatura e tridhjetë e një e Shqipërisë), officially known as the X Pluralist Legislature of Albania (Albanian: Legjislatura e X Pluraliste e Shqipërisë), is the legislature of Albania following the 2021 general election of Members of Parliament (MPs) to the Albanian Parliament. (Note: A direct dictionary translation would be "Assembly." However, the Albanian government uses the translation "Parliament.") The party of the Prime Minister Edi Rama, PS, obtained an absolute majority of 74 deputies, becoming the first party to win three consecutive terms since the fall of communism in Albania.

== Composition of the Parliament ==
=== Election of chairperson ===
==== Procedure for election of the Chairperson of the Parliament ====
The procedure for the election of the chairperson is foreseen by the Article 6 of Parliament's Rules which states that:

1. A candidate for Chairperson of the Parliament shall be nominated by at least 15 deputies. An MP can not support more than one candidate. The proposal should be made with writing, contains the relevant signatures and is submitted to the Provisional Secretariat of Parliament.
2. The Chairperson of the Parliament shall be elected without debate and by secret ballot, by majority vote, in the presence of more than half of all members of the Parliament. If none of the candidates has won the required majority, it is followed by a second round, where they vote for the two candidates that have received the most votes.
3. Voting is publicly organized and chaired by a 5-member Voting Committee that reflects, as far as possible, the political composition of the Parliament. The oldest member by age also exercises the function of the Chairperson the Voting Committee and announce the voting results.
4. The Speaker of the session immediately invites the elected Chairperson of the Parliament to take his place.

==== Inauguration day of the legislature ====
At 10:00 on September 10, 2021, the new X Legislature of the Albanian Parliament started in a session that was expected to be formal. The session was chaired by the oldest MP, who was Mrs. Luljeta Bozo from the ranks of the Socialists, who was elected for the first time as an MP at the age of 78. In the first plenary session, the Commission for the Verification of the Mandates of the Deputies was formed, consisting of 9 members (5 from the majority and 4 from the opposition). A second plenary session followed during the evening, at 17:00 from where the oath of the deputies mandated by the general elections of April 25, 2021 took place, followed by the election of the speaker of the new parliament.

The verification commission found 4 vacancies of deputies who had announced their resignation after being elected by the citizens and asked for their replacement with the deputies ranked after them according to the constituencies. From the ranks of the Socialists in the Tirana County, the seat of Najada Çomo was taken by Mimi Kodheli. In Durrës County, the seat of Lefter Koka was taken by Denis Deliu, while in Fier County, the seat of the former Speaker Gramoz Ruçi was taken by Mirela Pitushi. While from the ranks of Democrats in Lezhë County, Mark Marku was replaced by Elda Hoti.

The verification commission also divided the deputies according to the respective parties, since during the elections some parties participated under the banner of an alliance. Thus, the Socialist Party was confirmed with 74 deputies, as it entered the elections alone. The Democratic Party, which together with the allies won 59, in the new legislature will have 50 deputies under its banner. 4 deputies are from the ranks of the Socialist Movement for Integration, 3 from the Social Democratic Party, 3 from the Republican Party, 2 from the PDIU, 1 from the PAA, 1 from the LZHK and 1 PBDNJ. And the rest are MPs who have either decided to be independent or have been expelled from the parliamentary group, as is the case of former Democratic Party leader Sali Berisha, who was expelled just a day before the legislature from its party.

Only the Socialist Party, which was the winner of the elections, made a proposal for the post of the Chairman of parliament. The PS proposed Mrs. Lindita Nikolla.

While the biggest opposition party PD opposed Nikolla's as candidature with a preliminary decision taken in a party meeting and that then during the voting ends in the tearing of the ballot papers by each deputy in a demonstrative way.

==== Voting Sessions ====
The first voting session in parliament was chaired by the oldest member of the parliament, who was Mrs. Luljeta Bozo. After taking the oath, the MP, begin the session for the voting of the Speaker of Parliament, where the only candidate was Mrs. Lindita Nikolla who came from the ranks of the Socialists, thus becoming the 43rd Speaker of the Albanian Parliament.

Voting for Chairperson of the Parliament
Pro	Against	Abstentions
79 votes	4 votes	0 vote
Total of 137 votes, of which 54 invalid votes since they were torn before being thrown into the ballot box.

Six days later, on September 16, the presentation session of the governing program Rama III began, from where the Prime Minister himself and then each candidate for minister presented the objectives for the next four years. The session lasted over 20 hours postponing its closing for the following day. The third consecutive government of Rama was put to the vote on September 17, 2021, after a few days ago it had received the decree of President Ilir Meta. The new cabinet introduced consists of 12 women and only 5 men, making up 75 percent of government positions led by women. This has propelled Albania to the top of global rankings in terms of the percentage of women holding Cabinet positions.

Voting for the Government
Pro	Against	Abstentions
77 votes	53 votes	1 vote
Total of 131 votes, while 9 MPs did not take part in the voting.

== Members of Parliament ==
The following is a list of 140 members elected to the parliament in the 2021 Albanian parliamentary election. It consists of the representative's name, party, and they are divided according to the 12 constituencies of Albania to which they belong.

== Elected & Current Members of Albanian Parliament ==
=== Socialist Party of Albania ===
County	Full name	Notes
Berat County	Blendi Klosi	General Secretary of Socialist Party
Berat County	Bardhyl Kollçaku	Former Chief of the General Staff
Berat County	Hatixhe Konomi	
Berat County	Nasip Naço	
Berat County	Fadil Nasufi	
Dibër County	Lavdrim Krrashi	
Dibër County	Aurora Mara	
Durrës County	Lefter Koka (Resigned); Denis Deliu (Replaced)	Lefter Koka, a former environment minister, has been sentenced to six years and eight months on corruption charges related to the Fieri waste incinerator, one of Albania's largest ever corruption scandals.
Durrës County	Milva Ekonomi	Former Minister of State for Standards and Services
Durrës County	Jurgis Çyrbja (Resigned); Erion Meka (Replaced)	Jurgis Çyrbja, a former Socialist Party MP, was arrested shortly after resigning his parliamentary mandate. He is under investigation by SPAK for abuse of office during his tenure as director of the Durrës Property Registry in 2016.
Durrës County	Ilir Ndraxhi	
Durrës County	Edi Rama	Prime Minister of Albania
Durrës County	Rrahman Rraja (Resigned); Arkend Balla (Replaced)	Rrahman Rraja gives up MP after Kruja Scandal.
Durrës County	Klodiana Spahiu	
Durrës County	Alban Xhelili	
Elbasan County	Taulant Balla	Minister of State for Relations with Parliament
Elbasan County	Besion Ajazi (Resigned); Shkëlqim Bullari (Replaced)	Besion Ajazi ran for Mayor of Gramsh during the 2023 Albanian Local Elections
Elbasan County	Luan Duzha	
Elbasan County	Saimir Hasalla	
Elbasan County	Evis Kushi	Former Minister of Education, Sports and Youth
Elbasan County	Florenc Spaho	
Elbasan County	Dasantila Tahiraj	
Elbasan County	Klevis Xhoxhi	
Fier County	Ismet Beqiraj	
Fier County	Erion Braçe	
Fier County	Lindita Buxheli	
Fier County	Bujar Çela	
Fier County	Antoneta Dhima	
Fier County	Petro Koçi	
Fier County	Tatiana Piro (Nurce)	
Fier County	Gramoz Ruçi (Resigned); Mirela Pitushi (Replaced)	Gramoz Ruçi, announced that he has resigned from all functions of the Socialist Party.
Fier County	Baftjar Zeqaj	
Fier County	Nusret Avdulla	Defected from PDIU and is running in Socialist Party's open list in Fier.
Gjirokastër County	Bledar Çuçi	Leader of Parliamentary Group and Former Minister of Internal Affairs.
Gjirokastër County	Laert Duraj	
Gjirokastër County	Mirela Kumbaro	Minister of Tourism and Environment
Korçë County	Blerina Gjylameti	
Korçë County	Niko Peleshi	Former Minister of Defence
Korçë County	Ilirian Pendavinji	
Korçë County	Ilir Topi	
Korçë County	Olta Xhaçka	Former Minister for Europe and Foreign Affairs
Korçë County	Enslemvera Zake	
Kukës County	Gerta Duraku	
Lezhë County	Shpresa Marnoj	
Lezhë County	Eduard Ndreca	
Lezhë County	Lindita Nikolla	Former Speaker of the Parliament
Shkodër County	Benet Beci (Resigned); Frrok Gjini (Replaced)	Benet Beci ran for Mayor of Shkodër during the 2023 Albanian Local Elections.
Shkodër County	Edona Bilali	Former Minister of State for Entrepreneurs
Shkodër County	Agron Çela	
Shkodër County	Paulin Sterkaj	
Tirana County	Belinda Balluku	Deputy Prime Minister of Albania and Ministry of Infrastructure and Energy
Tirana County	Luljeta Bozo	
Tirana County	Klotilda Bushka	
Tirana County	Ermonela Felaj (Valikaj)	
Tirana County	Etilda Gjonaj	
Tirana County	Toni Gogu	
Tirana County	Najada Çomo (Resigned); Mimi Kodheli (Replaced)	She resigned without reason.
Tirana County	Alqi Bllako (Resigned); Pandeli Majko (Replaced)	The Assembly canceled the announced meeting to consider SPAK's request for the arrest of deputy Alqi Blako, after the latter resigned from the mandate of the deputy.
Tirana County	Ogerta Manastirliu	Minister of Education, Sports and Youth
Tirana County	Ulsi Manja	Minister of Justice
Tirana County	Arben Ahmetaj (Resigned); Plarent Ndreca (Replaced)	Arben Ahmetaj has been on the run since June 2023, while since July 24 he has been declared an international wanted man as he is accused of "non-declaration, false declaration and concealment of assets", alone and in collaboration, "Passive corruption of high state officials or elected officials local" in six cases, "Cleaning the proceeds of a criminal offense or criminal activity".
Tirana County	Arben Pëllumbi	
Tirana County	Xhemal Qefalia	
Tirana County	Orlando Rakipi	
Tirana County	Eduard Shalsi	
Tirana County	Elisa Spiropali	Speaker of the Parliament of Albania
Tirana County	Etjen Xhafaj	
Tirana County	Fatmir Xhafaj	
Vlorë County	Anila Denaj	Minister of Agriculture and Rural Development
Vlorë County	Damian Gjiknuri	
Vlorë County	Niko Kuri	
Vlorë County	Ilir Metaj	
Vlorë County	Teuta Ramaj	
Vlorë County	Pranvera Resulaj	
Vlorë County	Vullnet Sinaj	
Vlorë County	Anduel Tahiraj	

=== Democratic Party of Albania ===
County	Full name	Notes
Berat County	Tomor Alizoti	
Berat County	Kasëm Mahmutaj	
Dibër County	Kreshnik Çollaku	
Dibër County	Dhurata Tyli (Çupi)	
Dibër County	Xhemal Mziu	
Durrës County	~~Merita Bakiu~~	Defected to Euroatlantic Democrats
Durrës County	Oerd Bylykbashi	
Durrës County	Edi Paloka	
Durrës County	Ferdinand Xhaferaj	
Durrës County	Andia Ulliri	
Elbasan County
Elbasan County	~~Flutura Açka~~	On July 2024, she decided to become independent, disagreeing with the party's.
Elbasan County	Gazment Bardhi	Leader of the Parliamentary Group
Elbasan County	Lefter Gështenja	
Elbasan County	Zheni Gjergji	
Elbasan County	~~Dashnor Sula~~	Leaving the Democratic Party due to his non-candidate status in the parliamentary elections, chosen by Sali Berisha.
Elbasan County	Luçiano Boçi (Resigned); Qani Xhafa (Replaced)	Luçiano Boçi ran for Mayor of Elbasan in the 2023 Albanian Local Election.
Fier County	~~Enkelejd Alibeaj~~	On July 2024, he decided to become independent, disagreeing with the party's decisions. He later founded Djathtas 1912.
Fier County	Luan Baçi	
Fier County	Eralda Bano (Tase)	
Fier County	Saimir Korreshi	
Fier County	Ilda Dhori	
Gjirokastër County	Tritan Shehu	
Korçë County	Sorina Koti	
Korçë County	Ervin Salianji (Resigned); Andrea Mano (Replaced)	Salianji was sentenced to 1 year in prison for making a false report in the case known as “Babale”.
Korçë County	Bledion Nallbati	
Korçë County	Edmond Spaho	
Korçë County	~~Seladin Jakupllari~~	Defected to Djathtas 1912
Kukës County	Isuf Çelaj	
Kukës County	Flamur Hoxha	
Lezhë County	Agron Gjekmarkaj	
Lezhë County	Lindita Metaliaj	
Lezhë County	Kastriot Piroli	
Lezhë County	Mark Marku (Resigned); Elda Hoti (Replaced)	Mark Marku resigned as result of not agreeing with the direction of PD.
Shkodër County	Greta Bardeli	
Shkodër County	Helidon Bushati	
Shkodër County	Zef Hila (Resigned); Lodovik Hasani (Replaced)	Zef Hila ran for Mayor of Vau-Dejës in the 2023 Albanian Local Elections.
Shkodër County	Ramadan Likaj	
Shkodër County	Emilja Koliqi	
Tirana County	~~Lulzim Basha~~	Defected to Euroatlantic Democrats
Tirana County	Sali Berisha	Chairman of Democratic Party and Former Prime Minister of Albania
Tirana County	Belind Këlliçi (Resigned); Asllan Dogjani (Replaced)	Belind Këlliçi ran for Mayor of Tirana in the 2023 Albanian Local Elections.
Tirana County	Grida Duma (Resigned); Orjela Nebijaj (Replaced)	"Today I will tell you something that I will never forgive politics. I will never forgive the blow that my son gave me under the belt. At least I wish that these blows could have been a lesson for him not to be deceived by evil", said Duma .The reason for Dispute of Berisha and Basha.
Tirana County	Flamur Noka	General Secretary of Democratic Party
Tirana County	~~Orjola Pampuri~~	Defected to Euroatlantic Democrats
Tirana County	~~Agron Shehaj~~	Shehaj has stated that he is no longer part of the parliamentary group, as he was earlier expelled from Gazment Bardhi. After of his independence he makes his new party.
Tirana County	Jorida Tabaku	
Tirana County	Albana Vokshi	
Tirana County	Alfred Rushaj (Resigned); Petrit Doda (Replaced)	A Democrat member of Parliament left the party cause for Dispute of Basha and Berisha.
Vlorë County	~~Arbi Agalliu~~	On July 2024, he decided to become independent, disagreeing with the party's.
Vlorë County	Bujar Leskaj	
Vlorë County	Ina Zhupa	
Vlorë County	~~Fation Veizaj~~	Feizaj says that in this situation where the PD is, it has tried not to foster division, but emphasizes that recent developments have shown that the division in the Democratic Party is irreversible. Replaced by Gëzim Ademaj

=== Djathtas 1912 ===
County	Full name	Previous Party
Elbasan County	Flutura Açka	PD
Fier County	Enkelejd Alibeaj	PD
Korçë County	Seladin Jakupllari	PD
Vlorë County	Arbi Agalliu	PD

=== Euroatlantic Democrats ===
County	Full name	Previous Party
Tirana County	Lulzim Basha	PD
Tirana County	Orjola Pampuri	PD
Durrës County	Merita Bakiu	PD
Vlorë County	Gëzim Ademaj	PDIU

=== Freedom Party of Albania (Former LSI) ===
County	Full name	Notes
Fier County	Monika Kryemadhi	
Shkodër County	~~Agron Çela~~	He defected to the Socialist Party.
Tirana County	Petrit Vasili	
Tirana County	Erisa Xhixho	

=== Social Democratic Party of Albania ===
County	Full name	Notes
Shkodër County	Gledis Çeliku	
Shkodër County	Meri Markiçi	
Tirana County	Gertjan Deda	

=== Party for Justice, Integration and Unity ===
County	Full name	Notes
Fier County	~~Nustret Avdulla~~	Defected to Socialist Party of Albania
Tirana County	Mesila Doda	
Tirana County	Shpëtim Idrizi	
Vlorë County	~~Gëzim Ademaj~~	Defected to Euroatlantic Democrats

=== Others ===
County	Full name	Party
Durrës County	Agron Duka	PAA
Elbasan County	Dashnor Sula	Independent
Tirana County	Fatmir Mediu	PR
Tirana County	Dashamir Shehi	LZHK
Tirana County	Vangjel Dule	PBDNJ
Tirana County	Agron Shehaj	MUNDËSIA

== See also ==
- Parliament of Albania
- 2021 Albanian parliamentary election
