= 32nd Kuvendi =

Legislature of Albania elected in the 2025 parliamentary elections

Thirty-second Legislature of Albania Legjislatura e tridhjetë e dytë e Shqipërisë
- XXXII Legislature; XI Pluralist Legislature

Type
- Type: Unicameral
- Term limits: Four years

History
- Founded: 12 September 2025
- Preceded by: 31st Legislature

Leadership
- Prime Minister: Edi Rama

Structure
- Seats: 140 deputies
- Political groups: Government (82): PS (82); Supported by (3): PSD (3); Opposition (55): PD – ASHM (49) (Note: PD (41); PL (4); PLL (1); PR (1); PAA (1); PBDNJ (1)); PM (2); NSHB (1); LB (1); PDIU (1); Independent (1)

Website
- www.parlament.al

The Thirty-second Legislature of Albania (Albanian: Legjislatura e tridhjetë e dytë e Shqipërisë), officially known as the XI Pluralist Legislature of Albania (Albanian: Legjislatura e XI Pluraliste e Shqipërisë), is the legislature of Albania following the 2025 general election of Members of Parliament (MPs) to the Albanian Parliament. (Note: A direct dictionary translation would be "Assembly". However, the Albanian government uses the translation "Parliament".) The party of the Prime Minister Edi Rama, PS, obtained an absolute majority of 83 deputies, becoming the first party to win four consecutive terms since the fall of communism in Albania.

== Composition of the Parliament ==
=== Election of chairperson ===
==== Procedure for election of the Chairperson of the Parliament ====
The procedure for the election of the chairperson is foreseen by the Article 6 of Parliament's Rules which states that:

1. A candidate for Chairperson of the Parliament shall be nominated by at least 15 deputies. An MP can not support more than one candidate. The proposal should be made with writing, contains the relevant signatures and is submitted to the Provisional Secretariat of Parliament.
2. The Chairperson of the Parliament shall be elected without debate and by secret ballot, by majority vote, in the presence of more than half of all members of the Parliament. If none of the candidates has won the required majority, it is followed by a second round, where they vote for the two candidates that have received the most votes.
3. Voting is publicly organized and chaired by a 5-member Voting Committee that reflects, as far as possible, the political composition of the Parliament. The oldest member by age also exercises the function of the Chairperson the Voting Committee and announce the voting results.
4. The Speaker of the session immediately invites the elected Chairperson of the Parliament to take his place.

== Parliamentary groups ==
Group	Members		Leader Parliamentary group	Since
Group	At election	Current	Leader Parliamentary group	Since
Socialist Party of Albania	83 / 140	82 / 140	Taulant Balla	2025
Democratic Party of Albania	50 / 140	35 / 140	Gazment Bardhi	2025
Freedom Party of Albania	0 / 140	7 / 140	Tedi Blushi	2025
Alliance for Change	0 / 140	7 / 140	Fatmir Mediu	2025
Unalligned (Note: Social Democratic Party of Albania (3) Opportunity Party (2) Albania Becomes Movement (1) Together Movement (1) Party for Justice, Integration and Unity (1) Independent (1))	7 / 140	9 / 140	—	—
Source: KQZ

== List of current members ==
=== Socialist Party of Albania (Parliamentary Group) ===
County	Member	Notes
Berat County	Ervin Demo	
Berat County	Enriketa Jaho	
Berat County	Hysen Buzali	
Berat County	Fadil Nasufi	
Berat County	Hatixhe Konomi	
Dibër County	Blendi Klosi	
Dibër County	Alma Selami	
Dibër County	Agron Malaj	
Durrës County	Klodiana Spahiu	
Durrës County	Milva Ekonomi	
Durrës County	Loer Kume	
Durrës County	Skendër Pashaj	
Durrës County	Aurora Mara	
Durrës County	Arkend Balla	
Durrës County	Ani Dyrmishi	
Durrës County	Etleva Budini	
Elbasan County	Arbjan Mazniku	
Elbasan County	Bora Muzhaqi	
Elbasan County	Ermal Elezi	
Elbasan County	Adi Qose	
Elbasan County	Evis Kushi	
Elbasan County	Sara Mila	
Elbasan County	Saimir Hasalla	
Elbasan County	Olsi Komici	
Elbasan County	Aulona Bylykbashi	
Elbasan County	Agron Gaxho	
Fier County	Belinda Balluku	
Fier County	Petrit Malaj	
Fier County	Kiduina Zaka	
Fier County	Erjo Mile	
Fier County	Ana Nako	
Fier County	Ceno Klosi	
Fier County	Klevis Jahaj	
Fier County	Asfloral Haxhiu	
Fier County	Antoneta Dhima	
Fier County	Elton Korreshi	
Fier County	Raimon Kurti	
Fier County	Zegjine Çaushi	
Gjirokastër County	Mirela Kumbaro Furxhi	
Gjirokastër County	Tërmet Peçi	
Gjirokastër County	Piro Dhima	
Korçë County	Niko Peleshi	
Korçë County	Romina Kuko	
Korçë County	Genti Lakollari	
Korçë County	Ilirian Pendavinji	
Korçë County	Blendi Çomo	
Korçë County	Besa Spaho	
Kukës County	Eduard Shalsi	
Lezhë County	Ulsi Manja	
Lezhë County	Ermal Pacaj	
Lezhë County	Admir Kadeli	
Shkodër County	~~Marjana Koçeku~~	Koçeku has officially announced she is leaving Socialist Party parliamentary group, the reason of 2026 Albania protests.
Shkodër County	Onid Bejleri	
Shkodër County	Xhenis Çela	
Shkodër County	Bujar Rexha	
Tirana County	Edi Rama	
Tirana County	Ogerta Manastirliu	
Tirana County	Elisa Spiropali	
Tirana County	Lindita Nikolla	
Tirana County	Taulant Balla	Leader of Parliamentary group
Tirana County	Adea Pirdeni	
Tirana County	Albana Koçiu	
Tirana County	Igli Hasani	
Tirana County	Delina Ibrahimaj	
Tirana County	Ilva Gjuzi	
Tirana County	Iris Laurasi	
Tirana County	Erion Malaj	
Tirana County	Blendi Gonxhja	
Tirana County	Erion Braçe	
Tirana County	Ervin Hoxha	
Tirana County	Fatmir Xhafaj	
Tirana County	Orlando Rakipi	
Tirana County	Anila Denaj	
Tirana County	Olta Xhaçka	
Vlorë County	Bledi Çuci	
Vlorë County	Zamira Sinaj	
Vlorë County	Erjona Ismaili	
Vlorë County	Pirro Vengu	
Vlorë County	Damian Gjiknuri	
Vlorë County	Vullnet Sinaj	
Vlorë County	Ardit Bido	
Vlorë County	Vasil Llajo	
Vlorë County	Brunilda Mersini (Resigned); Briseida Çakërri (Replaced)	Mersini ran for Mayor of Vlora during the 2025 Albanian Local Elections

=== Democratic Party of Albania (Parliamentary Group) ===
County	Full name	Notes
Berat County	Eno Bozdo	
Dibër County	Xhelal Mziu	
Durrës County	Oerd Bylykbashi	
Durrës County	Gent Strazimiri	
Durrës County	Igli Cara	
Durrës County	Arian Ndoja	
Elbasan County	Tomor Alizoti	
Elbasan County	Blendi Himçi	
Fier County	Gazment Bardhi	Leader of Parliamentary group
Fier County	Luan Baçi	
Fier County	Saimir Korreshi	
Gjirokastër County	Tritan Shehu	
Korçë County	Ivi Kaso	
Korçë County	Bledjon Nallbati	
Korçë County	Fidel Kreka	
Kukës County	Flamur Hoxha	
Kukës County	Isuf Çelaj	
Lezhë County	Agron Gjekmarkaj	
Lezhë County	Elda Hoti	
Lezhë County	Gjin Gjoni	
Lezhë County	Kastriot Piroli	
Shkodër County	Luçiano Boçi	
Shkodër County	Kliti Hoti	
Shkodër County	Ramadan Likaj	
Shkodër County	Bardh Spahia	
Tirana County	Sali Berisha	
Tirana County	Flamur Noka	
Tirana County	Albana Vokshi	
Tirana County	Belind Këlliçi	
Tirana County	Jozefina Topalli	
Tirana County	Edi Paloka	
Tirana County	Klevis Balliu	
Tirana County	Besart Xhaferri	
Tirana County	Jorida Tabaku	
Vlorë County	Bujar Leskaj	

=== Freedom Party of Albania (Parliamentary group) ===
County	Party	Full name	Notes
Elbasan County	PD	Klodiana Çapja	
Elbasan County	PL	Edmond Haxhinasto	
Fier County	PL	Brunilda Haxhiu	
Korçë County	PD	Ledina Alolli	
Tirana County	PL	Tedi Blushi	Leader of Parliamentary group
Tirana County	PL	Erisa Xhixho	
Vlorë County	PD	Ina Zhupa	

=== Alliance for Change (Parliamentary group) ===
County	Party	Full name	Notes
Berat County	PD	Zija Ismaili	
Dibër County	PLL	Denisa Vata	
Durrës County	PAA	Artan Luku	
Durrës County	PD	Manjola Luku	
Shkodër County	PD	Greta Bardeli	
Tirana County	PR	Fatmir Mediu	Leader of Parliamentary group
Vlorë County	PBDNJ	Vangjel Dule	

=== Outside parliamentary groups ===
County	Party	Full name	Notes
Shkodër County	PSD	Besnik Brahimi	He replaces Tom Doshi, who has resigned
Shkodër County	PSD	Shkurt Lasku	She replaces Sabina Jorgo, who has resigned
Shkodër County	Ind.	Marjana Koçeku	
Tirana County	MUNDËSIA	Agron Shehaj	
Tirana County	MUNDËSIA	Erald Kapri	
Tirana County	SHB	Ana Dajko	
Tirana County	PSD	Tedi Mula	
Tirana County	BASHKË	Redi Muçi	
Tirana County	PDIU	Mesila Doda	

== See also ==
- Parliament of Albania
- 2025 Albanian parliamentary election
