= Ledina =

Ledina may refer to:

- Ledina, Slovenia, a dispersed settlement in the hills northwest of Sevnica in east-central Slovenia
- Ledina, Croatia, a village near Preseka, Zagreb County
- Ledina, an Albanian feminine given name. Notable people with the name include:
  - Ledina Aliolli, Albanian politician and member of the Assembly of the Republic of Albania
  - Ledina Çelo (born 1977), Albanian singer and model
  - Ledina Mandia, Albanian politician, Albanian Deputy Prime Minister

== See also ==
- Ledine (disambiguation)
