= Mark Marku =

Mark Marku may refer to:

- Mark Marku (singer)
- Mark Marku (politician)
