= Homeland Movement =

Homeland Movement may refer to:

- Homeland movement, to establish Aboriginal communities in Australia
- Homeland Movement (album), a 1989 aboriginal rock album by Yothu Yindi
- Homeland Movement (Croatia), a political party founded in 2020
- Homeland Movement (Albania), a political party founded in 2004
- Homeland Movement (Turkey), a political movement founded in 2020, became a party in 2021

== See also ==
- Our Homeland Movement
- Bengali Hindu Homeland Movement
