= Pëllumbi =

Pëllumbi is a surname. Notable people with the surname include:

- Arben Pëllumbi (born 1965), Albanian politician
- Jorgo Pëllumbi (born 2000), Albanian footballer
- Servet Pëllumbi (1936–2026), Albanian politician
