= Acka =

Acka is a surname. Notable people with the surname include:

- Donaldo Açka (born 1997), Greek-Albanian footballer
- Flutura Açka (born 1956), Albanian poet and politician
- Stephane Acka (born 1990), Ivorian footballer
