= Saimir Korreshi =

Albanian lawyer and politician (born 1981)

Member of the Albanian Parliament
- Incumbent
- Assumed office 10 September 2021
- Constituency: Fier County

Personal details
- Born: 13 March 1981 (age 45) Lushnjë, PSR Albania
- Party: Democratic Party of Albania
- Education: Sapienza University of Rome
- Profession: Lawyer, politician

Saimir Korreshi (born 13 March 1981) is an Albanian lawyer, politician and academic. He has served as a Member of the Parliament of Albania representing the Democratic Party of Albania for the Fier constituency since 2021.

== Early life and education ==
Korreshi completed his secondary education at the 18 Tetori Gymnasium in Lushnjë (1995–1999) and earned a doctorate in jurisprudence from the Faculty of Law at the Sapienza University of Rome in January 2007.

== Professional career ==
Before entering politics, Korreshi held several legal-administrative roles in Albania’s property registration system:

November 2007 – July 2008: Jurist at the ZVRPP (Local Office for Immovable Property Registration), Lushnjë

July 2008 – November 2009: Legal Specialist in the Appeals Sector, Central Property Registration Bureau, Tirana

November 2009 – February 2010: Technical-Legal Control Inspector at ZQRPP, Tirana February 2010 – October 2013: Registrar, ZVRPP Lushnjë

Since 2008, he has been an external lecturer at the Faculty of Economics, Aleksandër Xhuvani University in Elbasan.

== Political career ==
Korreshi was elected to the Albanian Parliament in the 2021 parliamentary elections, representing Fier County in the 31st legislature (10 September 2021 – 8 July 2025). He was re-elected in the 2025 parliamentary elections and is currently serving in the 32nd legislature.

== Television appearances ==
In 2023, Korreshi participated as a celebrity contestant on Dancing with the Stars Albania Season 9, paired with television presenter Enxhi Nasufi.
