= Flutura Açka =

Albanian poet and politician (born 1966)

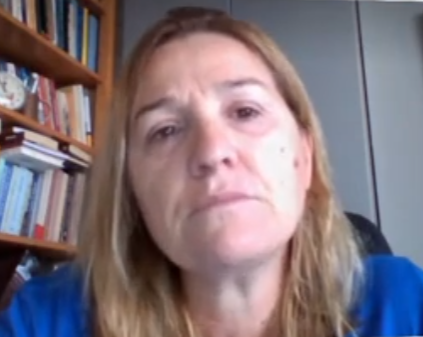
- In a 2020 interview

Personal details
- Born: 4 June 1966 (age 60) Elbasan, People's Socialist Republic of Albania
- Party: Democratic Party of Albania
- Education: University of Tirana; University of Elbasan

Flutura Açka (born 4 June 1966) is an Albanian writer, journalist, poet, publisher and politician. She won the "Lira e Struga" prize at the 1997 Struga Poetry Evenings, founded the Skanderbeg Books publishing house, and was elected as the Elbasan Deputy to the Albanian Parliament's 31st Kuvendi for the Democratic Party of Albania (DP) at the 2021 Albanian local elections.

== Biography ==
Açka was born on 4 June 1966 in Elbasan, People's Socialist Republic of Albania. She was educated to primary and secondary school level in her hometown, then studied economics at the University of Tirana, graduating in 1988. Açka began her working life as an economist in a slaughterhouse.

Açka studied Albanian language and literature at the University of Elbasan, graduating in 2001, and became a writer. She worked as a journalist at Elbasan's newspaper Fjala e lirë then for independent newspaper Ku vemi? Her poems were first published in the newspaper Shkumbini in 1988. Açka won the "Lira e Struga" prize at the 1997 Struga Poetry Evenings festival in Struga, North Macedonia. She has published several volumes of her poetry, with her works portraying "desolate landscapes where storms bring tears not rain" and exploring loneliness.

In 2001, Açka established the Skanderbeg Books publishing house in Tirana with her Dutch husband. Skanderbeg Books published the works of Albanian and foreign authors, including British novelist Doris Lessing.

In 2007, Açka published the first book in The Anima Balkanica project series of novels by contemporary Balkan women authors. Her 2014 book Kryqi I harresës has been translated into Dutch, a volume of her poetry has been translated into Macedonian, and she has been included in Albanian poetry anthologies that have been published in France, Germany, Greece, Italy, Macedonia, Romania and the USA.

In 2018, Açka's son Jerini died from a rare disease, aged 18.

Açka was elected as the Elbasan Deputy to the Albanian Parliament's 31st Kuvendi for the Democratic Party of Albania (DP) at the 2021 Albanian local elections. She was removed as chairperson of the education committee in 2022, then from the DP Parliamentary Group in 2024, over the Electoral Reform draft in the Law Commission. She remains active in political commentary, is critical of the Rama government and the deputies of the Socialist Party of Albania (PSSh), and has called for new leadership of the DP. She chose not to run in the 2025 Albanian parliamentary election.
