= Ledine =

Ledine may refer to:

- Ledine, Serbia, a settlement near Belgrade
- Ledine, Idrija, a village in Slovenia
- Ledine Klanječke, a village near Klanjec, Croatia

== See also ==
- Ledina (disambiguation)
