= Movement for National Development =

Movement for National Development Lëvizja për Zhvillim Kombëtar
- Abbreviation: LZHK
- Chairperson: Dashamir Shehi
- Founder: Leka Zogu I
- Founded: 2004
- Ideology: Conservativism; Monarchism
- Political position: Centre-right
- National affiliation: Djathtas për Zhvillim
- Colors: Blue
- National Assembly: 0 / 140
- Council Seats: 18 / 1,613

Website
- lzhk.al

The Movement for National Development (Albanian: Lëvizja për Zhvillim Kombëtar, LZHK) is a centre-right political party in Albania. The Movement for National Development was founded in 2004 as a five party coalition under the spiritual leadership of Leka I Zogu, King of the Albanians. The Movement for National Development entered the 2005 elections and won 47,967 votes, the result failed to achieve the required 4% for a coalition to enter parliament, falling short with 3,5% of the vote.

In October 2005 Dashamir Shehi registered the movement as a political party, and has since maintained an alliance with the Democratic Party.

In the 27th Legislature of Albania, LZHK held 1 from 140 seats in the Albanian parliament, which is the acting leader Dashamir Shehi. The party returned to parliament after the 2021 Albanian parliamentary election, winning 1 seat, contesting on the list of the Democratic Party.

== Election results ==
=== Parliamentary elections ===
Election	Leader	Votes	%	Seats	+/–	Government
2021	Dashamir Shehi	Part of PD-AN		1 / 140	▲1	Opposition
2025	Dashamir Shehi	Part of DZH		0 / 140	▼1	Extra-parliamentary
