= Petri Bozo =

Albanian director and producer (born 1965)

- Born: 10 March 1965 (age 61); Tirana, Albania
- Occupations: Director; Producer
- Years active: 1990–
- Spouse: Alda Bida
- Children: 2
- Parent(s): Todi Bozo; Luljeta Bozo

Petri Bozo (born 10 March 1965) is an Albanian former director.

== Biography ==
Bozo was born in Tirana, the son of director and filmmaker Todi Bozo and engineer and politician Luljeta Bozo. He spent his early years in the environment of the Albanian Kinostudio, where he observed film and media production.

He began his professional career in 1992 as a director and producer, focusing on television programs and beauty pageants. One of his long-term projects is Miss Albania, which he directed and developed for over two decades.

== Career ==
Bozo has directed and produced several events, including:

Miss Albania – national beauty pageant

Miss Universe Albania - Albanian national beauty pageant

Miss Globe – international beauty pageant

Netët e Klipit Shqiptar – music television program

Artistic beauty calendars – photography projects

== Personal life ==
Bozo is married to screenwriter Alda Bida. They have two children, a son and a daughter.

Crime

On May 25, 2026, Bozo killed a 7-year-old boy who was walking to school by running him over with his car in Elbasan.
