= Djathtas 1912 =

Right 1912 Djathtas 1912
- Abbreviation: DJATHTAS
- Leader: Enkelejd Alibeaj
- Founder: Enkelejd Alibeaj
- Founded: 12 October 2024; 21 months ago
- Split from: Democratic Party
- Ideology: Liberal conservatism Pro-Europeanism
- Political position: Centre-right
- National affiliation: Djathtas për Zhvillim (Right for Development)
- Parliament: 0 / 140
- Municipality: 0 / 61

Website
- www.djathtas1912.al

Right 1912 (Albanian: Djathtas 1912, DJATHTAS) is a centre-right Albanian political party. It was founded by Enkelejd Alibeaj, former member of the Democratic Party and former Minister of Justice, on 12 October 2024. During the PD split dispute, Alibeaj supported Lulzim Basha's faction. After Sali Berisha's faction was constitutionalized as PD leader, he founded a new party that opposed both factions to offer a new view and an alternative in 2025 elections.

== Election results ==
=== Parliamentary elections ===
Election	Leader	Votes	%	Seats	+/–	Government
2025	Enkelejd Alibeaj	Part of DZH		0 / 140	New	Extra-parliamentary
