= Andia Ulliri =

Albanian politician

Member of the Assembly of Albania
- In office 10 September 2021 – 8 July 2025

Personal details
- Born: 1 February 1999 (age 27) Krujë, Albania
- Party: Democratic Party of Albania
- Occupation: Politician; Architect

Andia Ulliri is an Albanian politician. She was elected member of the assembly on September 10, 2021, to serve in the 31st legislature. She was representing the Democratic Party of Albania under the PD-AN coalition for Durrës

== Career ==
- Assembly of Albania (2021–2025)
