= Tedi Blushi =

Albanian politician and journalist (born 1984)

Member of the Albanian Parliament
- Incumbent
- Assumed office 12 September 2025
- Constituency: Tirana County

Member of the Tirana Municipal Council
- In office 14 May 2023 – 30 May 2025

Personal details
- Born: 30 September 1984 (age 41) Korçë, PR Albania
- Party: Freedom Party
- Education: University of Tirana
- Profession: Journalist, politician

Tedi Blushi (born 30 September 1984) is an Albanian journalist and politician. In May 2025, he was elected as a Member of the Parliament of Albania under coalition Alliance for a Greater Albania, representing Tirana County. He has previously served as Media Advisor to the former President of Albania Ilir Meta and as a member of the Tirana Municipal Council.

== Education and early career ==
Blushi was born in Korçë and completed his primary education at the school "Mësonjëtorja e Parë Shqipe" and secondary education at "Raqi Qirinxhi" school. He studied journalism at the University of Tirana, where he obtained a master's degree.

He began his career in journalism in 2002 at the daily newspaper Koha Jonë. Over the following years, he worked at Standard and Gazeta Shqiptare in roles including political editor and deputy editor-in-chief. During this time, he was involved in investigative reporting and editorial commentary. He also participated in training programs in journalism and public communication. Later, Blushi was appointed director of the Albanian news agency BalkanWeb part of News 24 TV.

== Political and public roles ==
From 2017 to 2022, Blushi served as Media Advisor and Spokesperson to the President of Albania, Ilir Meta.

In July 2022, Blushi was among the founding members of the Freedom Party and was appointed Secretary General.

In the 2023 local elections, he was elected to the Tirana Municipal Council. During his term, he served as Deputy Chair of the Committee on Culture, Tourism, and Cultural Heritage.

In the parliamentary elections held on 11 May 2025, Blushi was elected to the Albanian Parliament representing the Tirana constituency. Following the confirmation of his mandate, he submitted his resignation from the Tirana Municipal Council in an official letter dated 30 May 2025, addressed to the Council and copied to State Election Commissioner Ilirjan Celibashi.
