= Marjana Koçeku =

Albanian politician (born 2000)

Member of the Albanian Parliament
- Incumbent
- Assumed office 2025
- Constituency: Shkodër County

Personal details
- Born: 16 November 2000 (age 25) Shkodër, Albania
- Party: Independent (since 2026)
- Other political affiliations: Socialist Party of Albania (2025–2026)
- Education: Luigj Gurakuqi University
- Occupation: Politician, entrepreneur

Marjana Koçeku (born 16 November 2000), also known as Neo Malësorja (lit. 'The Neo Highlander'), is an Albanian politician and entrepreneur who has served as a member of the Parliament of Albania since 2025. She was elected from Shkodër County in the 2025 Albanian parliamentary election.

== Early life and education ==
Koçeku was born in Shkodër, Albania. According to information submitted to the Central Election Commission, she studied at the Luigj Gurakuqi University, where she completed studies in political science and international relations.

== Career ==
Before entering politics, Koçeku was known by the nickname Neomalësorja ("The New Highland Woman") and was associated with an initiative promoting tourism and local development in northern Albania. Koçeku participated in the 2018–2019 student protests in Albania.

In March 2025, Koçeku joined the Socialist Party of Albania and was nominated as a parliamentary candidate in Shkodër County for the 2025 Albanian parliamentary election. She was elected to the Parliament of Albania in the 2025 parliamentary election. Following the constitution of the legislature, she was appointed to parliamentary committees approved by the Assembly of Albania. As a member of parliament, Koçeku raised issues relating to environmental protection, including concerns regarding the Drin and Buna rivers.

=== Departure from the Socialist Party ===
On 14 June 2026, Koçeku announced her departure from the Socialist Party parliamentary group and stated that she would continue her mandate as an independent member of parliament. The following day, Albanian media reported that Koçeku shared an image of a flamingo on social media. Some Albanian media outlets interpreted the post as a gesture of support for the 2026 Zvërnec protests, in which the flamingo had become a symbol used by protesters.

On 17 June, Koçeku wrote on social media that her family had been threatened by the Bajra group in Shkodër, a group described in Albanian media as a Shkodër-based criminal group. The group had previously been the subject of organized-crime investigations: in 2018, police arrested 11 people during an operation against the northern "Bajri" criminal group, while later reporting by BIRN noted that some defendants initially arrested as alleged members of a criminal organisation were ultimately convicted on lesser charges such as illegal gambling and illegal possession of weapons. The group had also been politically controversial in Shkodër before the protests; in 2023, Democratic Party leader Sali Berisha accused the Socialist Party of winning the Shkodër municipality with the help of the Bajra gang, while Socialist Party parliamentary leader Bledi Çuçi responded that he had no knowledge of such links and that, if the claims were proven true, anyone who broke the law would not be protected by the party. Koçeku warned that she would respond if her family was harmed, while the Bajraj family's lawyer, Sokol Tahiraj, rejected her claims as baseless and said that any allegation should be presented to the competent institutions. Shkodër police said that Koçeku had not filed a formal complaint. Her departure was welcomed by Democratic Party leader Sali Berisha, who called on other Socialist MPs to leave Rama and said that such a move could open the way for a no-confidence motion against the prime minister.

On 20 June, Koçeku appeared at the protest on Dëshmorët e Kombit Boulevard, joining demonstrators who were demanding Rama's resignation. On 23 June, Koçeku published an open letter to Rama calling on him to resign. She wrote that the protests were not directed against the United States, but against what she described as an internal political system built over decades on fear, servility and alienation. Koçeku said that Albanians were no longer inspired by Rama or the old political class and argued that the government faced a deep crisis of legitimacy. She also criticized the Socialist Party leadership, saying that it did not accept dissent, debate or moral sensitivity, and urged Rama to listen to the protesters. In the letter, she said that Rama's final political act should be his resignation, and claimed that in recent private messages he had told her she would be left alone and without public trust.

In a 27 June interview with Britannia Daily, Koçeku said that the protests reflected a deeper crisis of trust between citizens and political institutions. She argued that Parliament too often functioned as a place where party decisions were endorsed rather than scrutinised, and said that party discipline frequently took precedence over the public interest. Koçeku said the protests had not caused her departure from the Socialist Party group but had reinforced her decision, describing them as one of the most inspiring civic movements she had seen in Albania and Europe in recent years. She said that the issues raised by protesters, including government accountability, environmental protection, transparency over major development projects and the cost of living, were the same concerns that had led her to question Albania's political direction. Koçeku also said that many Albanians felt political decisions were increasingly being made without meaningful public consultation and that institutions had become less responsive to citizens. She argued that Albania needed a renewal of political culture rather than only a change of individual leaders, saying that lasting change required accountability, transparency, democratic dialogue and public service. Addressing protesters, she said that their voices mattered, that peaceful civic engagement was not in vain, and that they now had "a mandate in parliament" through her position as an independent MP.
