= Voltana Ademi =

Albanian politician (born 1974)

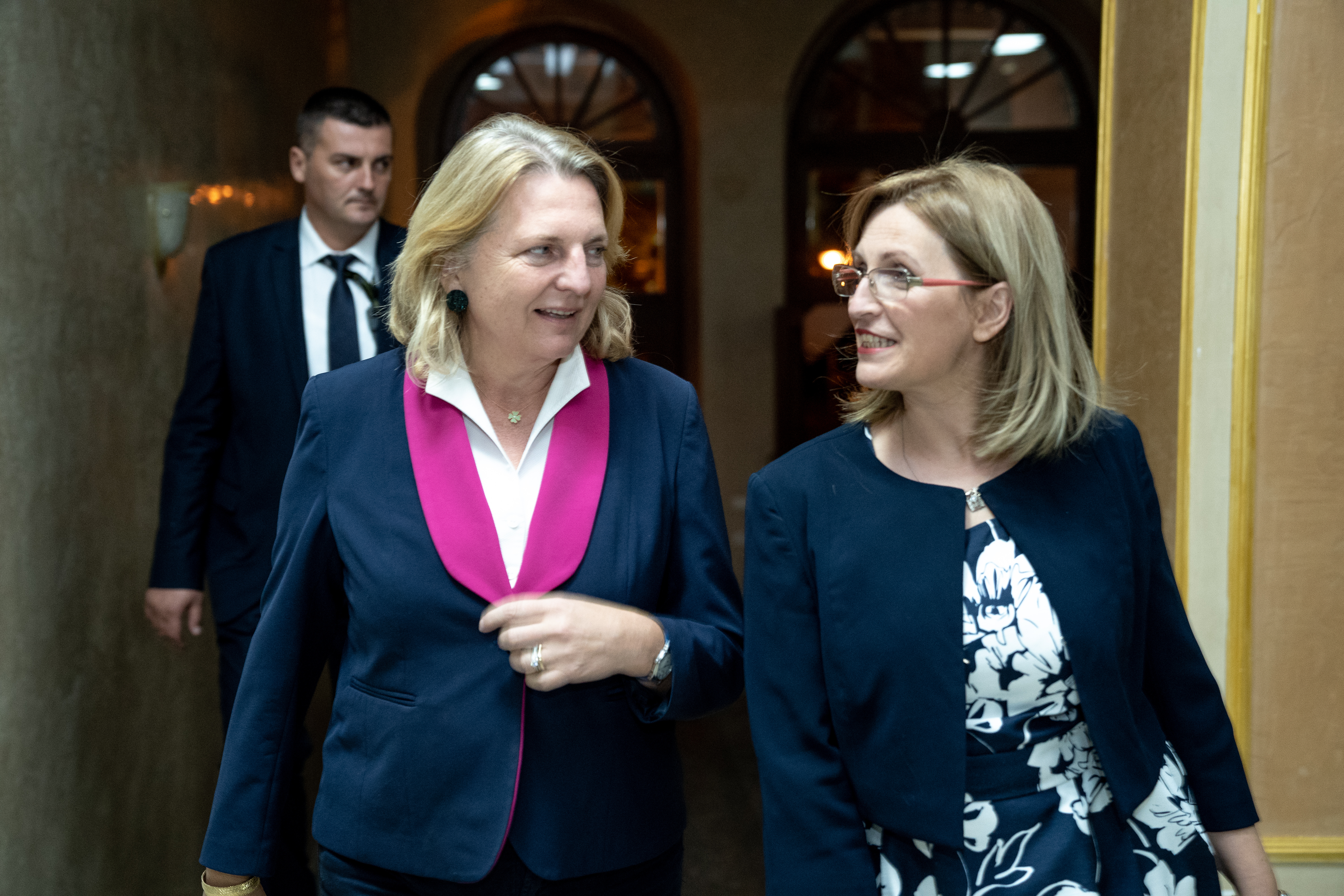
- Image of Karin Kneissl & Voltana Ademi

Mayor of Shkodër
- In office 20 August 2015 – 31 March 2022
- Preceded by: Lorenc Luka
- Succeeded by: Bardh Spahia

Personal details
- Born: 30 September 1974 (age 51) Shkodër, Albania
- Party: Democratic Party
- Children: 1
- Education: University of Tirana

Voltana Ademi (born 30 September 1974) is an Albanian politician who was the mayor of Shkodër.

== Early life and career ==
Voltana Ademi was born in Shkodër. She comes from a well-known family with significant influence and contribution to the social life of the city. Her ancestors are known as successful entrepreneurs in business and specifically, her family was a producer of the first tobacco brand in Shkodra ("Tarabosh" cigarette).

Ademi finished high school at the "Prenk Jakova" High School of Arts in Shkodër and after that she continued his higher studies at the Faculty of Natural Sciences of the University of Tirana, where she graduated in Informatics. She received a Master's degree in the program "For University and Territorial Development" at the University of Our Lady of Good Counsel. She worked as a lecturer at the University of Shkodër "Luigj Gurakuqi" where she gave lectures in Informatics and Programming.

Her political career began in 1996 as a member of the Democratic Party. From 2003 to 2008 she headed the Forum of the Women's Democratic League in Shkodër. From 2005 to 2009 she was elected a member of the PD National Council. In 2006 she was elected a member of the Shkodër Municipal Council and headed the group of councilors of the right-wing coalition. During the years 2007–2010 she performed the function of Deputy Mayor of Shkodër. Ademi was the Prefect of Shkodër County from 2011 to 2013.

Until April 2015, she served as a Democratic Party MP in the Assembly of the Republic of Albania, but then resigned to run in the local elections for the Municipality of Shkodër, where she won.

== Personal life ==
Voltana Ademi is married and has a son.
