= Greta Bardeli =

Albanian lawyer and politician (born 1980)

Member of the Albanian Parliament
- Incumbent
- Assumed office 2021
- Constituency: Shkodër County

Personal details
- Born: Greta Ndou; 12 April 1980 (age 46) Shkodër, PSR Albania
- Party: Democratic Party of Albania
- Education: Luigj Gurakuqi University of Shkodër
- Profession: Lawyer, politician, lecturer

Greta Bardeli Gjoni (née Ndou; born 12 April 1980) is an Albanian lawyer, academic and politician. She is a member of the Democratic Party of Albania and has served as a member of the Parliament of Albania for Shkodër County since the 2021 parliamentary elections, being re-elected in 2025.

== Early life and education ==
Bardeli was born on 12 April 1980 in Shkodër, Albania. She studied law at the Luigj Gurakuqi University of Shkodër, where she graduated in jurisprudence. Following her studies, she became a lecturer at the Faculty of Law at the same university.

== Political career ==
Bardeli entered politics with the Democratic Party of Albania in her hometown of Shkodër. She served as a member of the Shkodër Municipal Council and later as chairwoman of the Shkodër County Council. She has also held the position of deputy chairwoman of the Democratic Party branch in Shkodër.

In the 2021 parliamentary elections, Bardeli was elected to the Parliament of Albania representing Shkodër County, and she was re-elected in the 2025 elections.
