= Euroatlantic Democrats =

Euroatlantic Democrats Demokratët Euroatlantikë
- Abbreviation: DEA; KEA
- Leader: Lulzim Basha
- Spokesperson: Mirela Karabina
- Founder: Lulzim Basha
- Founded: 14 June 2024; 2 years ago
- Registered: 3 March 2025; 18 months ago
- Split from: Democratic Party of Albania
- Headquarters: Rruga "Donika Kastrioti", Tirana
- Newspaper: Rilindja Demokratike Euroatlantike
- Ideology: Liberal conservatism Pro-Europeanism; Atlanticism
- Political position: Centre-right
- Slogan: Albania deserves more ('Shqipëria meriton më shumë')
- National Assembly: 0 / 140

Website
- demokratet.al

Euroatlantic Democrats (Albanian: Demokratët Euroatlantikë, DEA), also known as Euroatlantic Coalition (Albanian: Koalicioni Euroatlantik, KEA) is a centre-right political party in Albania. It was founded by former PD leader, Lulzim Basha, as result of the party split in 2021.

== History ==
The party was created by Basha's faction three days after the decision taken by Court of Appeal on 11 June 2024 to return Democratic Party seal and logo to Sali Berisha. They consider the Court of Appeal decision as illegal and have appealed it to Supreme Court. On 3 March 2025, CEC registered them in the 2025 elections as "Euroatlantic Coalition", with Endri Hasa as leader. When founded the Euroatlantic Democrats had 4 deputies in the National Assembly: Lulzim Basha, Orjola Pampuri, Merita Bakiu and Gëzim Ademaj.

== Election results ==
=== Parliamentary elections ===
Election	Leader	Votes	%	Seats	+/–	Rank	Status
2025	Endri Hasa	20,864	1.30	0 / 140	▼4	7th	Extra-parliamentary
