= Endri Hasa =

Albanian politician

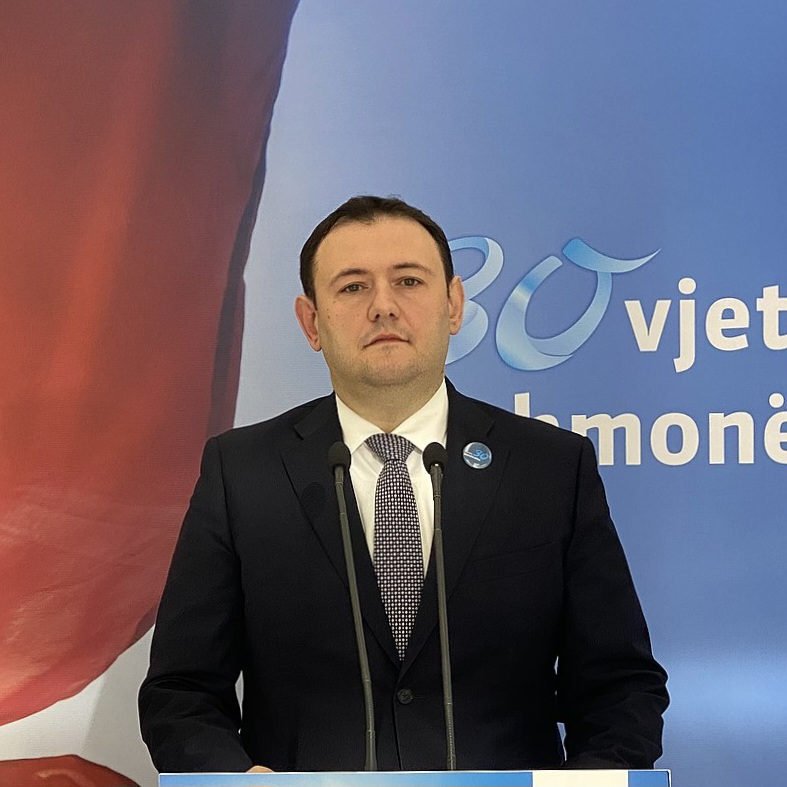

Member of the Albanian Parliament for Elbasan
- In office 9 September 2017 – 25 February 2019

Secretary for Digital Organization of Democratic Party
- In office 30 August 2021 – 11 December 2021

Member of the Presidency of Democratic Party
- In office 30 November 2014 – 11 December 2021

Personal details
- Born: 16 February 1981 (age 45) Elbasan
- Party: Euroatlantic Democrats
- Education: University of Florence, University of Sheffield
- Profession: Electronic Engineer

Endri Hasa (born in Elbasan, on 16 February 1981) is a former Albanian politician, member of the presidency of the Democratic Party of Albania that was member of the Assembly of the Republic of Albania for the Democratic Party of Albania (DP). He became member of the Presidency of the Democratic Party of Albania as Head of the Information Society Department in November 2014 and was re-elected in January 2019.

== Education ==
Endri has a degree in electronics engineering from the University of Florence and has successfully completed his postgraduate studies at the University of Sheffield.
