= Endri Fuga =

Albanian political adviser (born 1981)

Director of Communications Government of Albania
- Incumbent
- Assumed office 2013
- Prime Minister: Edi Rama

Personal details
- Born: 11 November 1981 (age 44) Tirana, PSR Albania
- Party: Socialist Party of Albania
- Spouse: Besa Fuga
- Education: Tufts University; Webster University

Endri Fuga (born 11 November 1981) is an Albanian political strategist, adviser and consultant, known for his role as the Director of Communications to the Prime Minister of Albania Edi Rama. Fuga's long-term relationship with the Prime Minister dates back to when Rama was mayor of Tirana. Fuga became known as the modernizer of the Socialist Party communications systems, as well as the architect of the 2013 left wing coalition campaign, which was characterized by the massive use of digital communication and social media. Prior to joining Rama at the Municipality of Tirana, Fuga was a civic society advocate, working closely with his friend, current mayor of Tirana Erion Veliaj. Fuga has worked as a strategist to political campaigns in Europe, South East Asia, Latin America and Africa. He has also been a consultant for different international organizations, like USAID, IRI, the Open Society Foundation in different parts of the world.

== Education ==
Fuga started his university studies at Sapienza University of Rome. He then transferred his undergraduate studies to the Vienna campus of Webster University after his father, Perparim Fuga was employed as a nuclear expert at the International Atomic Energy Agency in Vienna. In this task, Perparim Fuga was part of a team led by Mohamed ElBaradei, who won the Nobel Prize in 2005 for limiting the use of nuclear energy for military purposes.

Fuga completed his bachelor studies for media communications in 2007 in Vienna. He was granted his postgraduate degree in International Relations in 2017 by Tufts University, Fletcher School of Law and Diplomacy in Boston, USA. Fuga also received a leadership executive course diploma from Harvard's Kennedy School of Government in 2011.

== Career ==
In December 2002, during the winter holidays in Tirana, Fuga, together with high school friends, Erion Veliaj, Arbi Mazniku and Marinela Lika co-conceived the grass root campaign MJAFT! (Enough!). It became a civil society organization, Fuga assumed the position of its director of communications and was determinant in the media strategies that the organization pursued until his departure in 2007. The innovative concepts and new ways of civil resistance that “MJAFT!” used for the first time in Albania, were recognized locally and internationally, and in 2004 it was awardedthe United Nations civic society award.

In 2007, Fuga became communications adviser for the mayor of Tirana.

During the 2013 campaign, Fuga worked alongside Alastair Campbell, UK Prime Minister's Advisor, Tony Blair and Arthur J. Finkelstein, advisorsenior consultant of the Republican Party in the US.

In 2013, the Socialist Party won by a landslide the general elections. After the victory, the newly elected Prime Minister Edi Rama illustrated the influence of Fuga in the campaign by posting a picture saying: "EndriFuga - The Man who puts Rama in line"

Fuga advocated for the appointment of Special Advisors for Communications in each Ministry, who were mandated to report to both the respective Minister and Fuga himself.

Subsequent to his departure from the Albanian Government in March 2023, Fuga maintained his advisory position for Edi Rama while relinquishing his official roles. Post-government service, Fuga has served as a strategist for numerous political and civic campaigns across South East Asia, Europe, Latin America, and Africa.

== Controversies ==
The opposition has repeatedly attacked Fuga on a number of occasions, casting suspicion that he stands behind the departure of a number of old Socialist Party members. According to critics, Fuga has used his personal influence to the Prime Minister to promote new figures and friends from Mjaft.

Due to the low public profile that he has held (only two public communications over many years), Fuga has been repeatedly seen by opponents as the "gray eminence” of the Albanian Government. As a result, his figure has been the inspiration for many conspiracy articles, where he appears to be one of the most important persons in every day's decision-making process.

In 2015, the newspaper "Dita" stated that it was put under pressure by Fuga to erase critical news about the government.

== Personal life ==
Fuga is married to Besa Pëllumbi, with whom he has two children.
