= Orjola Pampuri =

Albanian psychologist

Member of the Albanian parliament
- In office 10 September 2021 – 8 July 2025
- In office 9 September 2017 – 20 February 2019

Personal details
- Born: 13 November 1981 (age 44) Tirana, Albania
- Party: Euroatlantic Democrats
- Education: University of Tirana

Orjola Pampuri is an Albanian psychologist and starting from September 2017, she will be representing the Democratic Party of Albania in the Parliament of Albania.

She was born on 13 November 1981 in Tirana and she and graduated from the University of Tirana in Psychology. She later finished her PhD studies there.

After the 2017 Parliamentary elections she was elected for the Democratic Party at the Albanian Parliament representing Tirana County.

She is the niece of Ymer Pampuri, an Albanian weightlifter who in the 1972 Summer Olympic Games became the first Albanian to break an Olympic record.
