= Arben Pëllumbi =

Albanian politician

Arben Pëllumbi (born 22 September 1965) is an Albanian politician. He has served in the Parliament of Albania since 2017 as a member of the Socialist Party.

== Early life and education ==
Arben Pëllumbi was born in Korçë on 22 September 1965. He completed his higher education at the University of Tirana in the Department of Electrical Engineering.

== Career ==
From 1988 to 1990, Pëllumbi worked as a design engineer at the Institute of Metallurgical Studies in Elbasan. He later worked as a specialist at the Institute of Information in Tirana from 1990 to 1991, executive director at the company Dea-Stt from 1991 to 1992, and administrative engineer at ABA sh.p.k from 1993 to 2017.

== Political career ==
Pëllumbi has served in the Parliament of Albania since 2017. He has led the parliamentary commission dealing with economic activities and protected areas.

Since 2018, Pëllumbi has been active in the Socialist Party of Albania, serving as the party's Secretary for Organization and Electoral Coordination.

In May 2025, following parliamentary election, Pëllumbi, along with ten other Socialist MPs, failed to secure enough preferential votes in Tirana’s competitive open-list race, meaning he would not return to Parliament in September. Despite being listed, the intense intra-party contest left several high-profile figures, including Pëllumbi, without a mandate.
