= Romina Kuko =

Albanian politician (born 1984)

Member of the Albanian Parliament
- Incumbent
- Assumed office 12 September 2025
- Constituency: Korçë County

Chairwoman of the Municipal Council of Tirana
- Incumbent
- Assumed office 20 June 2023

Deputy Minister of Internal Affairs
- In office 9 October 2017 – 02 September 2025

Personal details
- Born: 19 April 1984 (age 42) Korçë, PSR Albania
- Party: Socialist Party of Albania
- Education: University of Sheffield; School of Political Studies of the Council of Europe; Geneva Centre for the Democratic Control of Armed Forces; United Kingdom Defence Academy
- Profession: Politician, public administrator

Romina Kuko (born 19 April 1984) is an Albanian politician who served as Deputy Minister of Internal Affairs from October 2017 to September 2025. Since September 2025, she has been elected as a member of the Parliament of Albania, representing Korçë County.

== Education ==
Kuko completed a Bachelor of Sciences in Psychology with Honours at the University of Sheffield. She holds a Master of Science degree in International Relations and Diplomacy. She also obtained diplomas and certifications from the School of Political Studies of the Council of Europe, the OSCE Office for Democratic Institutions and Human Rights (ODIHR), the Geneva Centre for the Democratic Control of Armed Forces (DCAF), and the United Kingdom Defence Academy.

== Career ==
Kuko began her career in 2006 at the Ministry of Defence of Albania, working in the Directorate of Euro-Atlantic Integration as a desk officer for Central and Southeastern Europe.

From 2010, she worked in the Security Cooperation Department of the OSCE Presence in Albania, managing projects related to countering domestic violence, community policing, and implementation of United Nations Security Council Resolution 1325 concerning gender issues in the security sector. From 2014 to 2017 she led the Countering Violent Extremism project creating community responses to radicalization risks and by implementing a multi-agency approach.

She served as Deputy Minister of Internal Affairs from October 2017 until September 2025. In 2025, she was elected to the Albanian Parliament representing Korçë County. She has served as Chairwoman of the Municipal Council of Tirana since November 2020.
