= 2025 Albanian parliamentary election =

- 11 May 2025

All 140 seats in the Kuvendi 71 seats needed for a majority
- Opinion polls
- Registered: 3,713,897
- Turnout: 44.83% (▼1.46 pp)

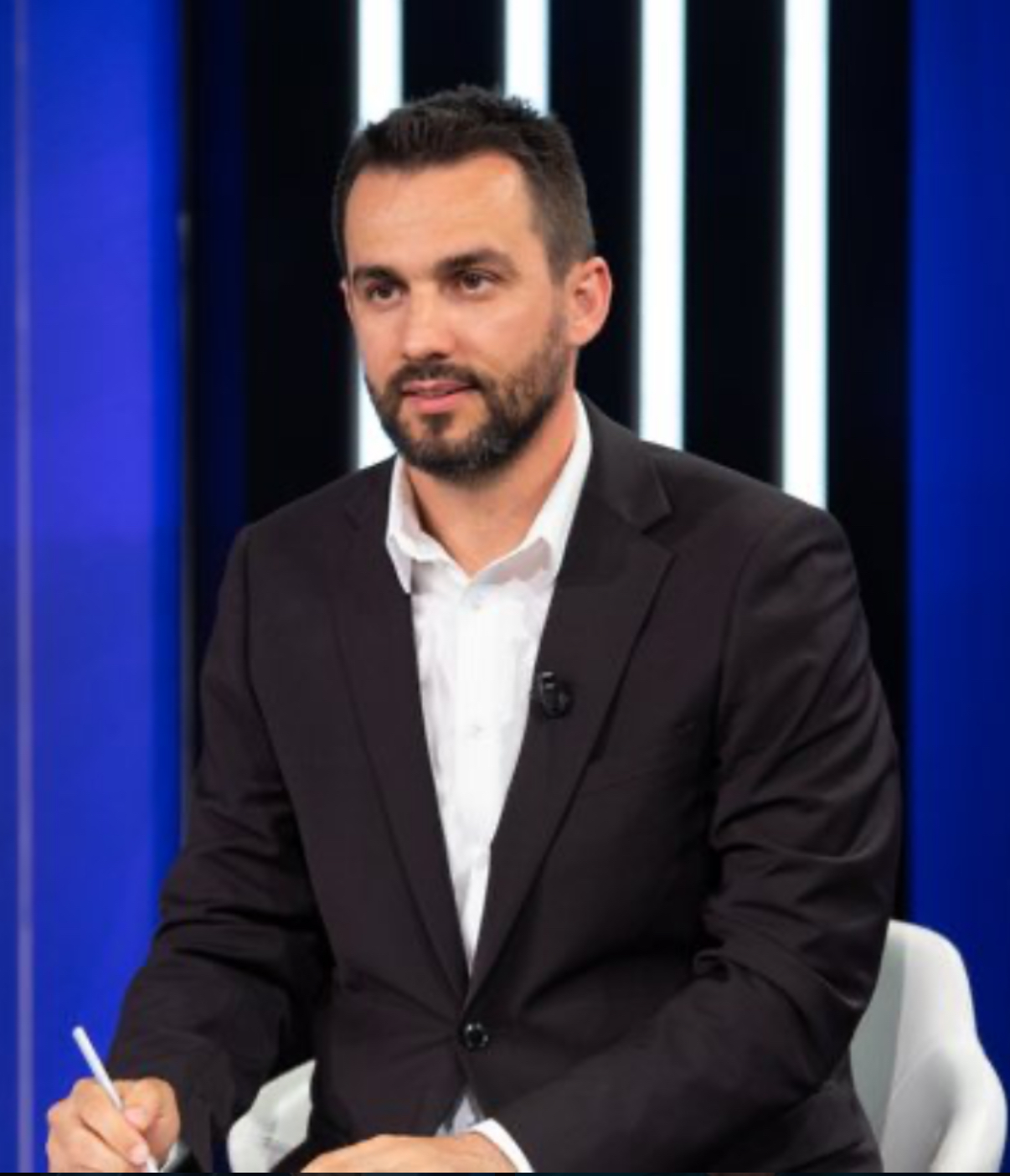

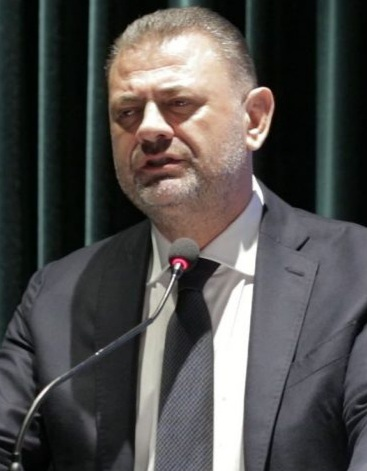

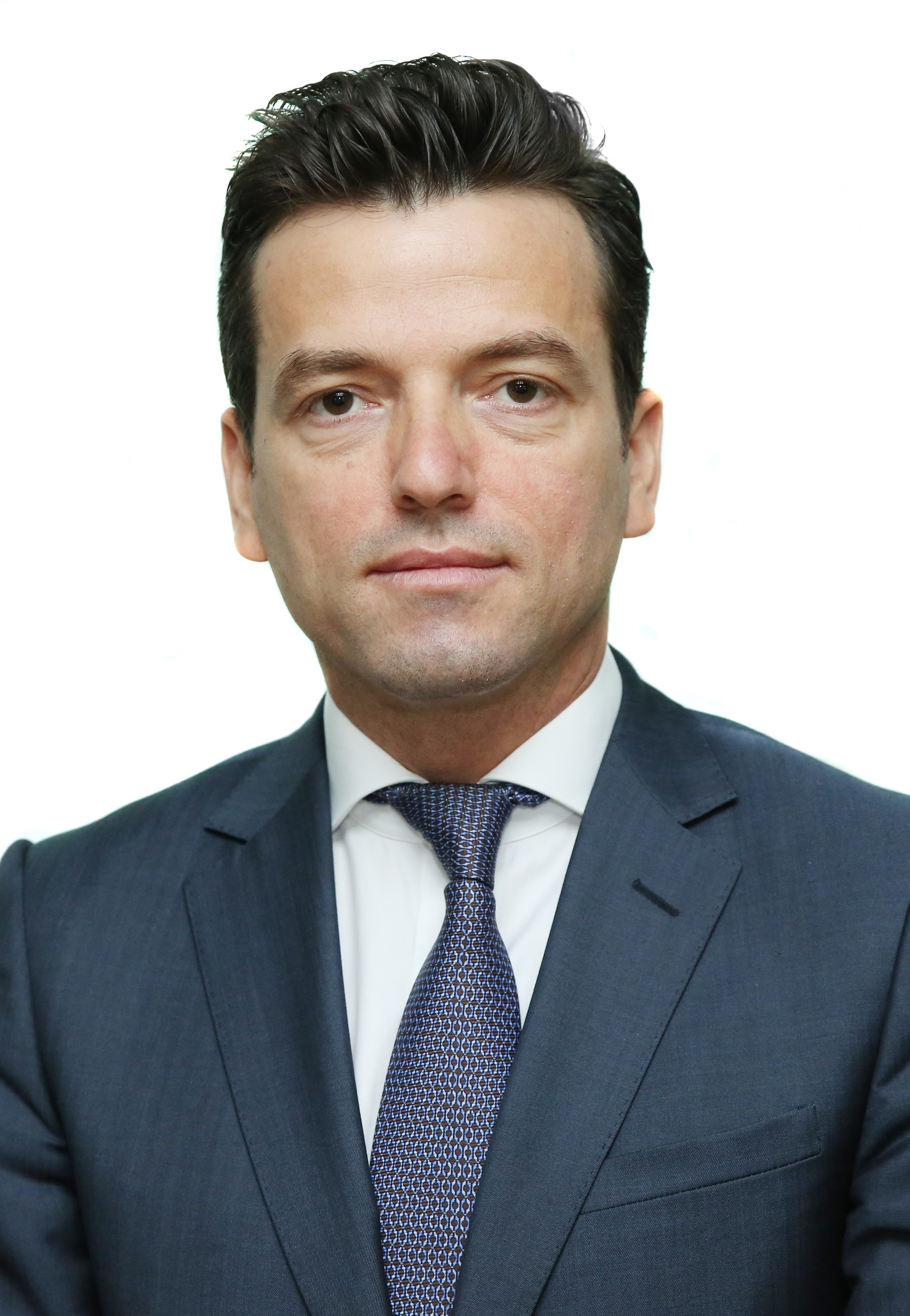

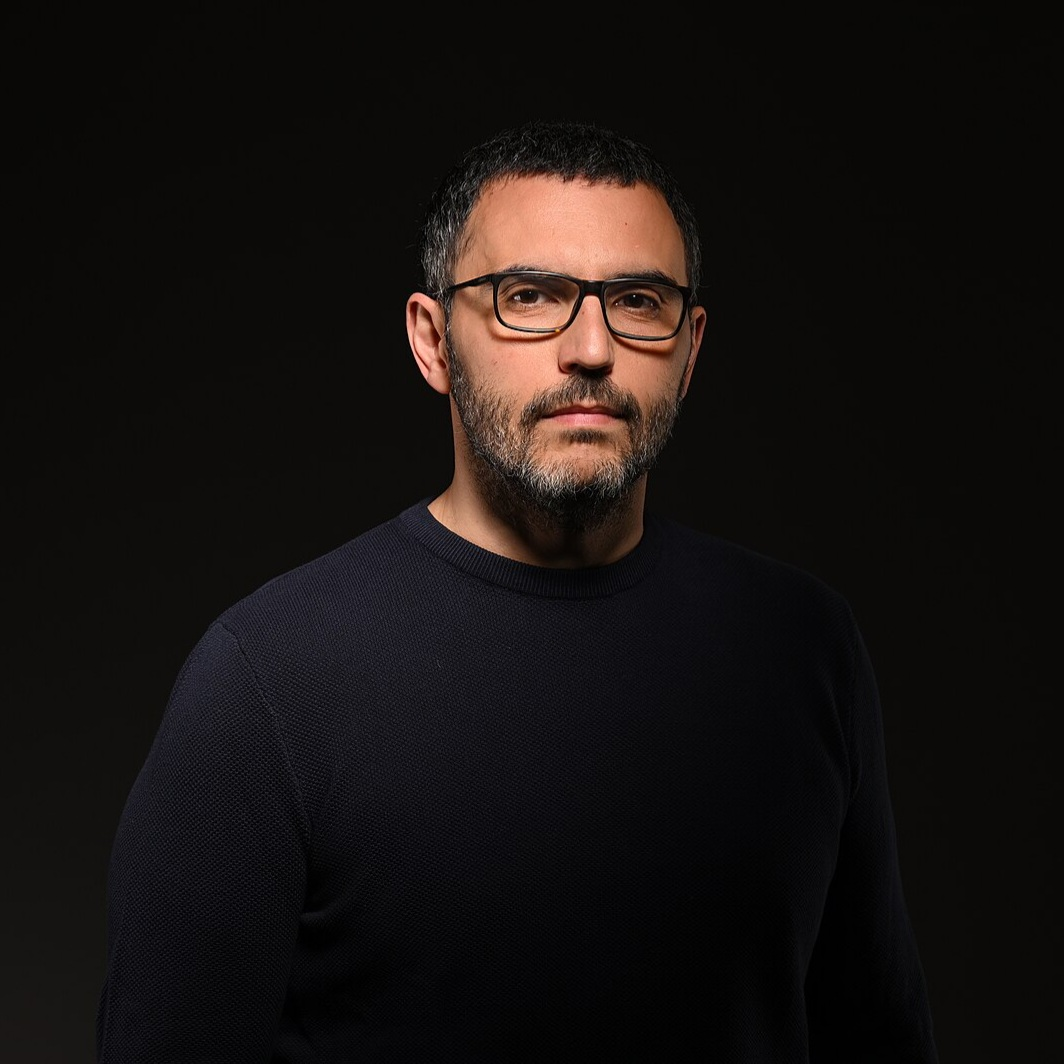
	First party	Second party	Third party
Candidate	Edi Rama	Sali Berisha	Adriatik Lapaj
Party	PS	PD	SHB
Alliance	PS	ASHM	NISMA–SHB (Note: The alliance is called Nisma Shqipëria Bëhet (known in the CEC as NISMA-SHB) and is led by the LSHB, while other members are NTH and LDPSH.)
Leader's seat	Tirana	Tirana	Tirana (lost)
Last election	48.67%, 74 seats	39.43%, 59 seats	0.65%, 0 seats
Seats won	83	50	1
Seat change	▲9	▼9	▲1
Popular vote	856,177	529,354	64,264
Percentage	53.27%	32.93%	4.00%
Swing	▲4.60 pp	▼6.50 pp	▲3.35 pp
	Fourth party	Fifth party	Sixth party
Candidate	Tom Doshi	Agron Shehaj	Arlind Qori
Party	PSD	MUNDËSIA	BASHKË
Leader's seat	Shkodër	Tirana	Tirana (lost)
Last election	2.25%, 3 seats	New party	New party
Seats won	3	2	1
Seat change	0	▲1 (Note: In the last elections, Agron Shehaj was elected to the Parliament of Albania as a Democratic Party MP. In 2022, he left the party and continued to serve as an independent MP. On June 1, 2024, he founded the Opportunity Party, which he represented as an Opportunity Party MP for the remainder of his term.)	▲1
Popular vote	49,890	48,995	24,616
Percentage	3.10%	3.05%	1.53%
Swing	▲0.85 pp	New	New
- Results by administrative unit and county.
Prime Minister before election
Edi Rama
PS
Elected Prime Minister
Edi Rama
PS

Parliamentary elections were held in Albania on 11 May 2025 to elect the 140 members of Parliament. They resulted in a fourth consecutive victory for the ruling Socialist Party (PS) led by Prime Minister Edi Rama, which increased its majority in parliament, with a promise of attaining European Union membership for Albania by 2030.

The elections took place against a backdrop of scandals during the party's previous term, including the arrest of Tirana mayor Erion Veliaj, Kukës mayor Safet Gjici, the incinerator scandal, and the 5D Affair. Opposition leader and leader of the Democratic Party Sali Berisha accused PS of pressure, fraud and vote-buying following the elections. Other allegations included vote buying through financial incentives and public sector jobs, misuse of state resources, and a patronage system in which PS activists monitored voters near polling stations.

OSCE's observation mission had a mixed reaction, saying the elections were competitive and well-run but lacked a level playing field including self-censorship by journalists, and a confrontational and polarizing campaign, with the two main political parties using divisive language and attempting to unduly influence voters. The elections were marked by widespread misuse of public resources and institutional power by the ruling party PS, while numerous reports of pressure on public employees and other voters as well as cases of intimidation were of concern.

The elections also marked the first time that Albanian citizens living abroad were allowed to vote.

== Background ==
In the 2021 parliamentary elections, the Socialist Party (PS) won 74 of the 140 seats in the parliament, resulting in Edi Rama being re-elected as Prime Minister. The PD-AN alliance, which was led by the centre-right Democrats and added several smaller parties to its coalition in the 2021 election, increased their seat-share from 43 to 59 seats.

During the same period, President Ilir Meta faced widespread allegations of violating the constitution, particularly in his intervention in the electoral process and the overt partisan stance against the PS he adopted during the 2021 elections. In June 2021, the parliament initiated impeachment proceedings against Meta, accusing him of undermining the neutrality of the presidency. However, in February 2022, the constitutional court ruled that Meta's actions did not constitute a violation of the constitution.

== Electoral system ==
The electoral system of Albania is constructed upon the principles defined in the constitution and the electoral code. As a parliamentary republic, Albania implements a regional proportional representation method that allocates seats in the parliament according to the proportion of votes garnered by political parties in a multi-party system. The parliament is composed of 140 representatives with a term of four years. The constitution codifies substantial democratic principles, stipulating that voting rights are equal, free, and conducted through secret ballot. All citizens of Albania, upon reaching the age of 18 and having not been deprived of voting rights, are permitted to participate in elections. The electoral code also establishes comprehensive procedures for voter registration, ensuring that all eligible citizens can participate fully in the process. The allocation of representatives in the parliament is based on population size within 12 electoral districts, which correspond to the first-level administrative regions (counties) of Albania. The D'Hondt method is employed for seat distribution to parties, contingent upon an electoral threshold of 1%.

In the 2025 election, 46 seats were filled by politicians on closed lists and one-third of the politicians elected to the parliament needed to be women.

=== Allocation of seats by county ===
#	County	2024 population	Seats	Ch.
1	Berat	140,956	7	Steady
2	Dibër	107,178	5	Steady
3	Durrës	226,863	14	Steady
4	Elbasan	232,580	14	Steady
5	Fier	240,377	16	Steady
6	Gjirokastër	60,013	4	Steady
7	Korçë	173,091	10	▼1
8	Kukës	61,998	3	Steady
9	Lezhë	99,384	7	Steady
10	Shkodër	154,479	11	Steady
11	Tirana	758,513	37	▲1
12	Vlorë	146,681	12	Steady

=== Election date ===
According to the constitution, parliamentary elections in Albania are required to be conducted no later than 60 days after and no earlier than 30 days prior to the expiration of the parliament's mandate. On 11 October 2024, commissioner Ilirjan Celibashi of the Komisioni Qendror i Zgjedhjeve (KQZ) recommended the period between 20 April and 11 May 2025, as the most appropriate timeframe for the upcoming parliamentary elections. On 11 November 2024, President Bajram Begaj procedurally initiated consultations to determine the election date for the elections, inviting representatives from the Coalition for Reforms, Integration, and Consolidated Institutions (KRIIK) to the Presidenca.

Following on 19 November, Begaj held the first round of consultations with leaders of smaller opposition parties, who proposed 4 May as the most suitable election date. This suggestion was made in light of the anticipated European Political Community Summit in Tirana on 9 May, with leaders arguing that holding elections before the summit would prevent potential electoral manipulation. Begaj described the consultations as the beginning of a transparent and constructive electoral process. He emphasised that the decision regarding the election date should be based on the best interests of voters, following a balanced, open debate with input from a wide range of political and institutional actors. The Democratic Party declined to participate in consultations with Begaj. The Freedom Party accepted the invitation, with Tedi Blushi and Erisa Xhixho requesting that the President decree any election date permitted by the Electoral Code, except the one proposed by Taulant Balla of the Socialist Party. Basha refrained from proposing a specific date but emphasised that the primary focus should be on election standards rather than the date itself. On 25 November, Begaj concluded the consultation process and highlighted the importance of the process, stating that the discussions were guided by the best interests of the voters rather than narrow political calculations. Conclusively, on 5 December, Begaj announced that the 2025 elections would be scheduled for 11 May 2025.

=== Amendments ===
On 26 July 2024, the parliament approved the amendments to the new electoral code, which included provisions for diaspora voting and the allocation of mandates. A significant focus centered on the formula employed for candidate lists, which was no longer entirely open; instead, one-third was designated as closed and subject to the discretion of the party leader, thereby exempting it from preferential voting. Furthermore, the new regulations stipulated that one out of every three candidates elected from the open list was required to be a woman, thereby reflecting a commitment to enhancing gender representation within the electoral framework.

On 7 December 2024, the KQZ approved the allocation of electoral mandates and the creation of 93 electoral administration zones (ZAZ) for the 2025 elections. Municipalities with over 80,000 voters were divided into multiple ZAZs. The KQZ also finalized the mandate distribution, with Tirana set to elect 37 deputies, while Korça's representation will decrease to 10 due to the loss of one mandate.

In preparation for the 2025 elections, the KQZ introduced the PER application to facilitate the registration and voting of Albanian emigrants abroad. This initiative aims to ensure diaspora participation in the electoral process, with registration scheduled from 11 January to 11 March. To register, emigrants must provide a valid passport and a document verifying their residential address. The PER app, available for download on both mobile devices and computers, will serve as the sole method for voting from abroad. Once registered, emigrants will be removed from the domestic voter list, and by 11 May, a separate list of overseas voters will be finalised.

=== Parliamentary parties ===
As of the electoral code, a parliamentary party is defined as a political organisation that has achieved representation in the parliament by obtaining a minimum of one seat in the most recent electoral contest. Subsequent to the 2021 parliamentary election, the PS obtained 74 of the 140 seats, emerging as the majority party. The PD–AN secured 59 seats, while LSI acquired 4 seats and the PSD attained 3 seats.

The table below lists the parties represented in the 31st Kuvendi that was elected in 2021.

Name		Ideology	Position	Leader	2021 result		Ref.
Name		Ideology	Position	Leader	Votes (%)	Seats	Ref.
PS	Socialist Party of Albania; Partia Socialiste e Shqipërisë	Social democracy	Centre-left	Edi Rama	48.68	74 / 140	
PD–AN	Democratic Party–Alliance for Change; Partia Demokratike–Aleanca për Ndryshim	Liberal conservatism	Centre-right	Lulzim Basha	39.43	59 / 140	
LSI	Socialist Movement for Integration; Lëvizja Socialiste për Integrim	Social democracy Social conservatism	Centre-left	Monika Kryemadhi	6.81	4 / 140	
PSD	Social Democratic Party of Albania; Partia Socialdemokrate e Shqipërisë	Social democracy	Centre-left	Tom Doshi	2.25	3 / 140	

== Parties and coalitions ==
According to the electoral code, each political party is mandated to submit a registration request to the CEC no later than 70 days prior to the scheduled election date. This request must comprehensively contain several critical components, including the identity of the party chair authorised to present candidates, the official name and acronym of the party, a specimen of the official stamp, and the contact information for both the finance officer and communication officer. Registered political parties have the option to form coalitions, which must also be registered with the KQZ at least 60 days before the election. A political party that is part of a coalition is restricted from engaging in another coalition or presenting candidates independently. The coalition is required to designate a leading party, which assumes the responsibility for fulfilling the legal obligations formed in the electoral code, and to document inter-party relations in a formal coalition agreement submitted to the KQZ. It is essential that both political parties and coalitions submit a multi-name list of candidates for the parliament election no later than 50 days prior to the election.

In June 2024, Lulzim Basha, the former leader of the Democratic Party, established a new faction titled, the Democratic Party–Euroatlantic Democrats, following internal conflicts regarding the ownership of the party's official seal. By November 2024, Basha revealed that he was engaged in advanced discussions with Endri Shabani of Nisma Thurje to explore potential electoral cooperation. However, Shabani publicly rejected the possibility of such an alliance, asserting that a cooperation with Basha or his faction was "zero".

On 24 September 2024, representatives of the Democratic Party initiated consultations with allies for the upcoming elections, with Ilir Meta of the Freedom Party being the first to meet. Meta did not take a clear stance on whether to run on a joint electoral list or separately, but expressed a preference for using his own party's logo. On 14 November 2024, the party's leader Sali Berisha, who was placed under house arrest since December 2023, addressed concerns about Meta's involvement in the electoral list for the elections, despite Meta's imprisonment in October 2024. Berisha underscored that Meta, who is according to him incarcerated without a clear charge, would be included in the electoral list if his party joined the coalition.

By the time of the election, the CEC had registered 53 political parties and 11 coalitions. In order to be in the ballot, parties either needed to have a certain number of MPs in the current parliament or have 5,000 signatures, while coalitions either needed to have a certain number of MPs in the current parliament or have 7,000 signatures.

The table below lists the parties which have registered in CEC for the next election and have qualified for ballot access.

List	Party or Coalition		Leader	Ideology	Position
1	PD – ASHM	Democratic Party – Alliance for a Magnificent Albania; Partia Demokratike – Aleanca për Shqipërinë Madhështore Composition: Democratic Party of Albania (PD) Partia Demokratike; Freedom Party of Albania (PL) Partia e Lirisë; Party for Justice, Integration and Unity (PDIU) Partia për Drejtësi, Integrim dhe Unitet; Republican Party of Albania (PR) Partia Republikane Shqiptare; Environmentalist Agrarian Party (PAA) Partia Agrare Ambientaliste; Legality Movement Party (PLL) Partia Lëvizja e Legalitetit; Unity for Human Rights Party (PBDNJ) Partia Bashkimi për të Drejtat e Njeriut; Demochristian Party of Albania (PDK) Partia Demokristiane e Shqipërisë; Christian Democratic Party of Albania (PKD) Partia Kristian Demokrate e Shqipërisë; New Democratic Spirit (FRD) Fryma e Re Demokratike; Liberal Democratic Union (BLD) Bashkimi Liberal Demokrat; Albanian National Front Party (PBK) Partia Balli Kombëtar Shqiptar; Democratic National Front Party (PBKD) Partia Balli Kombëtar Demokrat; Democratic Union Party (PBD) Partia Bashkimi Demokrat; Conservative Alliance for Albania (AKPSH) Aleanca Konservatore për Shqipërinë; National Conservative Party of Albania (PKKA) Partia Kombëtare Konservatore Albania; Albanian Emigration Party (PESH) Partia Emigracion Shqiptar; National Arbnore Alliance (AAK) Aleanca Arbnore Kombëtare; People with Disabilities (PAK) Personat me Aftësi të Kufizuar; Democratic Movement for Change Party (PLDN) Partia Lëvizja Demokratike Për Ndryshim; Time Party of Albania (ORA) Partia Ora e Shqipërisë; Albanian Christian Democratic League (LDKSH) Lidhja Demokristiane Shqiptare; Party for Europeanization and Integration of Albania (PEISH) Partia për Europianizim dhe Integrimin e Shqipërisë; The True Albanian Way (RVSH) Rruga e Vërtetë Shqiptarë	Sali Berisha	Pro-Europeanism; Conservatism; Albanian nationalism Right-wing populism Minority interests	Centre to far-right
2	BASHKË	Together Movement; Lëvizja Bashkë	Arlind Qori	Democratic socialism Left-wing populism	Left-wing
3	LA	Homeland Movement; Lëvizja Atdheu	Kreshnik Osmani	Right-wing populism	Right-wing to far-right
4	KEA	Euroatlantic Coalition; Koalicioni "Euro-Atlantike"	Endri Hasa	Liberal conservatism	Center-right
5	PS	Socialist Party of Albania; Partia Socialiste e Shqipërisë Composition: Socialist Party of Albania (PS) Partia Socialiste e Shqipërisë; Macedonian Alliance for European Integration (AMIE) Aleanca Maqedonase për Integrimin Europian	Edi Rama	Social democracy Third Way	Center-left
6	NISMA–SHB	Albania Becomes Initiative Coalition; Koalicioni "Nisma Shqipëria Bëhet" Composition: Hashtag Initiative (NTH) Nisma Thurje; Albania Becomes Movement (LSHB) Lëvizja Shqipëria Bëhet; League for the Rights of Albanian Workers (LDPSH) Lidhja Për të Drejtat e Punëtorëve Shqiptarë	Adriatik Lapaj	Centrism; Populism	Center; Big tent
7	AKSH	Albanian National Alliance; Aleanca Kombëtare Shqiptare	Elena Kocaqi	Civic nationalism Populism	Big-tent
8	ADR	New Democracy Alliance Party; Partia Aleanca Demokracia e Re	Edmond Stojku	Social liberalism	Center-left
9	DZH	Right for Development Coalition; Koalicioni "Djathtas për Zhvillim" Composition: Right 1912 (DJATHTAS) Djathtas 1912; Movement for National Development (LZHK) Lëvizja për Zhvillim Kombëtar	Dashamir Shehi	Liberal conservatism	Center-right
10	MUNDËSIA	Opportunity Party; Partia Mundësia	Agron Shehaj	Liberal conservatism	Centre-right
11	PSD	Social Democratic Party of Albania; Partia Socialdemokrate e Shqipërisë	Tom Doshi	Social democracy	Center-left

== Campaign ==
The campaign of this election was characterized by the vast use of social media, especially from smaller parties, as they did not have as much television access compared to larger parties.

=== Preceding events ===
==== TikTok ban ====
On 21 December 2024, Prime Minister Edi Rama announced that TikTok would be banned in Albania for at least one year, starting from the beginning of 2025. Rama cited the death of a teenager in a brawl linked to a conflict on TikTok and concerns over social media promoting youth violence. Alongside this ban, the Albanian government plans to initiate educational programs for students and parents.

On 13 March 2025, the Electronic and Postal Communications Authority (AKEP) and the National Cybersecurity Authority (AKSK), per the decisions released by the Albanian government, instructed all internet service providers in Albania to block TikTok's IPs, DNS resolution, and Server Name Indications, as well as ByteDance's IP addresses.

Opposition leader Sali Berisha criticized the ban, arguing it would hinder their ability to run online campaigns ahead of the elections. Hundreds of Democrat protesters gathered in front of the Kryeministria building on 15 March 2025 to protest the ban. Arlind Qori, leader of Together Movement, considered the ban as an act of censorship.

=== Campaign themes ===
==== Socialist Party campaign ====
2025 Socialist Party of Albania election campaign
- Candidate: Edi Rama; 33rd Prime Minister of Albania (2013–)
- Affiliation: Socialist Party of Albania
- Status: Start: 12 April 2025; Election Day: 11 May 2025; Projected win: 12 May 2025; Certification from KQZ: 22 May 2025; Certification from Regulatory Commission: 28 August 2025
- Headquarters: Tirana, Albania
- Key people: Endri Fuga
- Slogan(s): "Shqipëria 2030 në BE, vetëm me Edin dhe PS" (Albania 2030 in EU, only with Edi and PS)

Website
- https://ps.al/shqiperia-2030/

The 2025 parliamentary election campaign of the Socialist Party of Albania (PS) was the fifth consecutive national campaign led by Prime Minister Edi Rama, who sought to extend his tenure beyond a decade in power. The campaign culminated in a decisive victory on 11 May 2025, with the PS securing 83 out of 140 seats in the Albanian Parliament, its strongest result to date.

Having governed since 2013, the Socialist Party entered the 2025 race with a platform centered on European Union accession, economic modernization, and institutional reform. The campaign was launched amid growing public fatigue with political polarization and concerns over corruption, media freedom, and democratic backsliding.

The campaign was anchored in the slogan "Albania 2030 in EU, only with Edi and SP," positioning the party as the sole credible force capable of delivering EU membership within the decade. Rama emphasized continuity, stability, and technocratic governance, highlighting achievements in infrastructure development, including road networks and urban renewal, tourism, juridical reform and digitalization of public services.

The campaign culminated in a high-profile rally on 9 May (Europe Day) in Tirana, symbolically aligning the party's message with Albania's European aspirations.

The Socialist Party and Edi Rama ran a strong attacking campaign against the opposition and also ridiculing it, openly calling Sali Berisha "bufi" (the owl) and the Democratic Party, "këneta" (the swamp) Rama was also noted for using strong language to belittle and mock opponents, also specifically claiming at a rally in Dibër that "half of the men in this country are retarded".

==== Democratic Party Campaign ====
2025 PD–ASHM election campaign
- Candidate: Sali Berisha; 32nd Prime Minister of Albania (2005–2013)
- Affiliation: Democratic Party of Albania Alliance for a Great Albania
- Status: Start: 12 April 2025; Election Day: 11 May 2025; Projected loss: 12 May 2025; Certification from KQZ: 22 May 2025; Certification from Regulatory Commission: 28 August 2025
- Headquarters: Tirana, Albania
- Key people: Chris LaCivita; Paul Manafort; Floriana Garo (spokesperson)
- Slogan: "Ta bëjmë Shqipërinë Madhështore" (Let's Make Albania Great)

Website
- https://pd.al/shqiperia-madheshtore/

The Democratic Party of Albania (PD) entered the 2025 parliamentary elections under the leadership of Sali Berisha, running as part of the Alliance for a Magnificent Albania (ASHM). The campaign was launched on 11 April with a rally in Tirana's Mother Teresa Square, marking the start of a month-long effort to reclaim ground lost in previous elections.

The PD's campaign centered on themes of anti-corruption, restoring democracy, and defending the vote. Berisha framed the election as a battle against what he called a "regime of theft and betrayal," accusing the ruling Socialist Party of state capture and electoral manipulation. The party adopted the slogan "Make Albania Great", a deliberate echo of American populist rhetoric, and hired Chris LaCivita, a U.S. political strategist known for his work on Donald Trump’s campaigns. The campaign emphasized juridical independence, reversation alleged politicization of institutions, economic liberalization and support for small businesses, protection of national idenitity and traditional values, return of the diaspora through tax reductions. The party also focused on increasing the minimum pension to 200 euro a month while the minimum pension at 500 euros.

Despite a high-profile campaign and aggressive rhetoric, the Democratic Party-Alliance for a Magnificent Albania secured 50 seats, down from 63 in 2021, marking one of its weakest performances in decades. The result reflected both internal fragmentation and the limited resonance of its populist messaging. Berisha’s continued leadership—despite international sanctions and legal controversies—remained a polarizing factor within the party and among voters.

=== Main parties' slogans ===
Party	Original slogan	English translation	Ref.
Socialist Party	Shqipëria 2030 në BE, vetëm me Edin dhe PS	"Albania 2030 in the EU, only with Edi (Rama) and SP"	
Democratic Party	Ta bëjmë Shqipërinë Madhështore	"Let's Make Albania Great"	
Euroatlantic Coalition	Shqipëria meriton më shumë	"Albania deserves more"	
Together Movement	E reja po lind	"The new is being born"	
Opportunity Party	Për një Shqipëri ku ia del me punë	"For an Albania where you can accomplish with work"	
Albania Becomes Initiative	Shqipëria vlen më shumë se partia	"Albania is worth more than the party"	
Social Democratic Party	Misioni vazhdon	"The mission continues"	

=== Observers ===
The Organization for Security and Cooperation in Europe deployed 338 officials led by Lamberto Zannier to monitor the election.

=== Campaign incidents ===
==== Allegations of vote buying from PS ====
On 11 May 2025, the Democratic Party accused the Socialist Party of operating a vote-buying scheme from an office in Tirana linked to its network of patronage activists. The event was broadcast live on Syri Television, showing alleged PS activists using the place to pressure voters and give benefits for political support. Belind Këlliçi, the Political Leader of the Democratic Party for Tirana County, publicly called for immediate police intervention; however, the police reportedly arrived approximately two hours later. By the time law enforcement reached the scene, several activists and the Socialist Party MP Erion Braçe had already fled the premises, allegedly taking materials with them. Among those identified at the scene was Ledi Imeraj, Director of the National Innovation Agency. Socialist Party MP Erion Braçe was accused not only of protecting the alleged patronage operation but also of using violence against journalist Ambrozia Meta during the live broadcast. Although the police stated that no compromising or illegal materials were found during the search conducted in the presence of representatives from both political parties, all individuals present were escorted to Police Station No. 2 for questioning. Statements and formal complaints were filed by representatives of both parties. The Special Anti-Corruption Structure (SPAK) opened an investigation into the case. (Note: Attributed to multiple sources)

==== PD-PS Lezhë brawl ====
The opposition, led by the PD, accused members of the PS of attempting to buy votes. Andi Marku, the head of PS in Kolsh, was allegedly involved in these claims. Meanwhile, Pjerin Ndreu, the Mayor of Lezhë, dismissed these allegations and accused PD of staging provocations. Groups of militants affiliated with both parties reportedly blocked roads, restricting movement and heightening tensions. Fatjon Zefi, the Deputy Mayor of Lezhë, was one of the individuals caught in this disruption when his vehicle was stopped, leading to a verbal and physical confrontation between PD and PS representatives. Later on, authorities stepped in to detain several individuals for questioning.

==== Allegations of vote buying from PSD ====
Allegations of vote-buying involving the Social Democratic Party (PSD) surfaced in Malësi e Madhe, particularly in Koplik. Ardian Hysa, the head of PSD in Malësi e Madhe, was investigated for allegedly attempting to buy votes. Authorities also scrutinized Florenc Kalaj, a local resident suspected of facilitating the process. Police uncovered WhatsApp messages suggesting coordination between PSD representatives and voters regarding financial incentives. SPAK authorized searches of Hysa's business and personal property as part of the probe.

== Members of the Kuvendi standing down ==
Name	Party	County	Elected since	Ref.
Helidon Bushati	PD	Shkodër County	2013	
Kasem Mahmutaj	PD	Berat County	2021	
Eralda Bano	PD	Fier County	2021	
Emilja Koliqi	PD	Shkodër County	2021	
Ferdinand Xhaferraj	PD	Durrës County	2021	
Lefter Gështenja	PD	Elbasan County	2021	
Zheni Gjergji	PD	Elbasan County	2021	
Orjela Nebilaj	PD	Tirana County	2022	
Ilda Dhori	PD	Fier County	2021	
Dashnor Sula	PD	Elbasan County	2005	
Sorina Koti	PD	Korçë County	2021	
Nasip Naço	PS	Berat County	2009	
Petro Koçi	PS	Fier County	2005	
Klevis Xhoxhi	PS	Elbasan County	2021	
Agron Çela	PS	Shkodër County	2013	
Luljeta Bozo	PS	Tirana County	2021	
Lavdrim Krashi	PS	Dibër County	2021	
Ilir Metaj	PS	Vlorë County	2021	
Gerta Duraku	PS	Kukës County	2021	
Eduard Ndreca	PS	Lezhë County	2021	
Niko Kuri	PS	Vlorë County	2021	
Anduel Tahiraj	PS	Vlorë County	2021	
Paulin Sterkaj	PS	Shkodër County	2005	
Shpresa Marnoj	PS	Lezhë County	2021	
Laert Duraj	PS	Gjirokastër County	2021	
Baftjar Zeqaj	PS	Fier County	2021	
Mirela Pitushi	PS	Fier County	2021	
Ismet Beqiraj	PS	Fier County	2017	
Lindita Buxheli	PS	Fier County	2017	
Tatiana Piro	PS	Fier County	2017	
Ilir Topi	PS	Korçë County	2021	
Bardhyl Kollçaku	PS	Berat County	2021	
Pranvera Resulaj	PS	Vlorë County	2021	
Teuta Ramaj	PS	Vlorë County	2021	
Agron Duka	PAA	Durrës County	2013	
Monika Kryemadhi	PL	Fier County	2013	
Petrit Vasili	PL	Tirana County	2013	
Flutura Açka	DJATHTAS	Elbasan County	2021	

== Opinion polls ==
=== Nationwide ===
Polling firm	Date	Sample	PS	Alliance for a Great Albania			PSD	Albania Becomes Initiative		PM	LB	KEA	DZh	Others	Lead
Polling firm	Date	Sample	PS	PD	PDIU	PL	PSD	NTH	LSHB	PM	LB	KEA	DZh	Others	Lead
MRB-Hellas + Euronews Albania	24 April– 4 May	1,600	48.2%	31.9%			1.8%	7.9%		7.5%	2.0%	—	—	0.7%	16.3%
Piepoli Italy + Report TV	5 May	1,200	48.4% 75	35.4% 54			2.0% 1	7.6% 7		4.8% 3	1.4% 0	0.1% 0	0.1% 0	0.2%	13.0%
McLaughlin + Top Channel Albania	14–24 April	1,200	48.9%	34.4%			2.9%	4.2%		5.0%	1.1%	0.9%	–	0.4%	14.5%
Angi Ricerche + ABC News Albania	19–22 April	3,000	51.1%	36.8%			2.5%	7.6%		5.4%	2.0%	1.1%	–	0.9%	14.3%
Notosondaggi + News24 Albania	15–22 April	2,000	45.5%	36.0%			2.0%	5.5%		6.5%	2.0%	1.0%	0.5%	1.0%	9.5%
MRB-Hellas + Euronews Albania	10–21 April	1,600	47.9%	33.7%			0.7%	6.7%		6.3%	2.4%	0.8%	0.6%	1.0%	14.2%
Angi Ricerche + ABC News Albania	17–20 April	6,000	48.9%	35.1%			1.9%	6.4%		4.8%	1.6%	0.7%	–	0.6%	13.8%
Piepoli Italy + Report TV	10–15 April	1,200	48.0%	35.0%			2.0%	8.0%		4.5%	1.5%	0.75%	0.25%	0.25%	13.0%
Notosondaggi + News24 Albania	11–13 April	2,005	46.0%	35.0%			2.5%	5.0%		6.5%	1.5%	2.0%	1.0%	0.5%	11.0%
Piepoli Italy + Report TV	3–8 April	1,000	48.5%	35.0%			1.0%	7.5%		5.0%	2.0%	0.75%	0.25%	–	13.5%
MRB-Hellas + Euronews Albania	22 March–3 April	1,600	46.9%	34.7%			1.2%	7.7%		5.1%	2.1%	1.3%	–	1.0%	12.2%
Piepoli Italy + Report TV	20–25 March	1,000	48.5%	37.0%			1.5%	8.5%		3.5%	1.0%	0.25%	0.25%	–	11.5%
Piepoli Italy + Report TV	13 March	1,000	48.5%	37.0%			2.0%	7.5%		3.0%	1.5%	0.25%	0.25%	–	11.5%
McLaughlin + Top Channel Albania	25–30 February	1,200	49.2%	35.7%	–	–	1.2%	0.2%	6.8%	1.6%	0.9%	0.7%	–	0.3%	13.5%
MRB-Hellas + Euronews Albania	15–25 February	1,600	48.3%	34.3%	–	1.7%	–	–	6.3%	4.8%	2.5%	–	–	2.1%	14%
MRB-Hellas + Euronews Albania	15–30 January	1,600	50.1%	30.8%	–	1.7%	–	–	7.9%	3.8%	2.7%	–	–	3.0%	19.3%
Eduard Zaloshnja + Report TV	17 October 2024	1,860	50.3%	30.2%	1.0%	1.5%	1.0%	1.7%	6.8%	3.1%	1.0%	0.7%	0.9%	2.1%	20.1%
2021 election	25 April 2021	1,578,117	48.67%	39.43%		6.81%	2.25%	0.65%	–	–	–	–	–	2.84%	9.24%

=== Tirana ===
Polling firm	Date	Sample	PS	Alliance for a Great Albania			PSD	Albania Becomes Initiative		PM	LB	Others	Lead
Polling firm	Date	Sample	PS	PD	PDIU	PL	PSD	NTH	LSHB	PM	LB	Others	Lead
Piepoli Italy + Report TV	5 May	–	48.2% 19	34.6% 14			1.3% 0	8.6% 3		4.8% 1	2.2% 0	0.3%	13.6%
MRB-Hellas + Euronews Albania	24 April – 4 May	1,000	44.4% 17/19	32.1% 13/14			2.2% 0/1	7.1% 2/3		7.6% 2/4	3.9% 1/2	2.5%	12.3%
McLaughlin + Top Channel Albania	5 May	–	50.0%	32.2%			1.8%	4.8%		6.0%	2.2%	1.5%	17.8%
MRB-Hellas + Euronews Albania	11–22 April	1,000	46.2% 18	30.6% 12			–	7.6% 3		8.7% 3	4.0% 1	2.9%	15.6%
Notosondaggi + News24 Albania	28 April	–	46.0% 17/19	33.0% 13/14			2.0% 0/1	4.5% 1/2		10.5% 3/4	2.5% 0	1.5%	13.0%
Piepoli Italy + Report TV	24 April	—	48.0% 18/19	34.5% 13/14			1.0% 0	8.0% 2/3		5.5% 1/2	2.0% 0	1.0%	13.5%
MRB-Hellas + Euronews Albania	22 March – 3 April	1,000	47.4% 19	30.7% 12			–	7.4% 2/3		7.4% 2/3	4.1% 1	3.0%	16.7%
MRB-Hellas + Euronews Albania	15–25 February	1,600	46.2%	32.2%	–	1.3%	–	2%	7.5%	5.8%	3.7%	1.2%	13.9%
Eduart Zaloshnja + Report TV	13 February	–	46% 17/19	38% 12/14	–	–	–	–	5.5% 1/3	5.5% 1/3	4.5% 0/2	0.5%	8%
2021 election	25 April 2021	484,769	48.67% 18	39.12% 15		6.0% 2	2.85% 1	0.84% 0	–	–	–	2.84%	9.55%

=== Elbasan ===
Polling firm	Date	Sample	PS	Alliance for a Great Albania			Albania Becomes Initiative		PSD	PM	LB	KEA	Others	Lead
Polling firm	Date	Sample	PS	PD	PDIU	PL	NTH	LSHB	PSD	PM	LB	KEA	Others	Lead
Piepoli Italy + Report TV	5 May	–	55.7% 8	26.9% 4			7.3% 1		1.2% 0	6.6% 1	2.0% 0	0.1% 0	0.2%	28.8%
McLaughlin + Top Channel Albania	5 May	–	56.3%	35.6%			3.1%		–	2.3%	1.6%	1.0%	0.1%	20.7%
Notosondaggi + News24 Albania	28 April	—	51.0% 7/8	30.5% 5/6			4.5% 0		0.5% 0	6.0% 0/1	4.5% 0	1.5% 0	1.5%	20.5%
Angi Ricerche + ABC News Albania	28 April	—	58.3%	36.1%		1.6%	4.6%		1.6%	1.9%	1.3%	1.8%	1.9%	22.2%
2021 election	25 April 2021	156,162	55.21; 8	37.06% 6		4.42% 0	1.11% 0	–	0.38% 0	–	–	–	1.82%	18.15%

=== Shkodër ===
Polling firm	Date	Sample	Alliance for a Great Albania			PS	PSD	Albania Becomes Initiative		LB	PM	KEA	Others	Lead
Polling firm	Date	Sample	PD	PDIU	PL	PS	PSD	NTH	LSHB	LB	PM	KEA	Others	Lead
Piepoli Italy + Report TV	5 May	–	42.8% 6			35.3% 4	8.6% 1	6.6% 0		0.9% 0	4.9% 0	0.1% 0	0.8%	7.5%
McLaughlin + Top Channel Albania	14-24 April	—	43.1%			36.1%	11.1%	2.5%		0.3%	0.7%	1.6%	0.1%	7.0%
Notosondaggi + News24 Albania	28 April	—	45.0% 5/6			34.5% 3/4	16.0% 1/2	1.0% 0		0.5% 0	1.0% 0	1.0% 0	1.0%	10.5%
ShkodraWeb	28 April	333	61.0% 7			21.0% 3	8.0% 1	1.0% 0		0% 0	6.0% 0	3.0% 0	—	40.0%
Piepoli Italy + Report TV	24 April	—	43.5% 5/6			35.0% 3/5	8.5% 0/2	6.5% 0/2		1.0% 0	4.5% 0	0.25% 0	0.75%	8.5%
ShkodraWeb	15 April	312	58.0% 6/7			21.0% 2/3	10.0% 1/2	1.0% 0		0% 0	5.0% 0	4.0% 0	1.0%	37.0%
ShkodraWeb	6 April	577	55.9; 6/7			23.2% 3/4	11.9% 1/2	0.6% 0		–	3.2% 0	3.8% 0	1.4%	33.6%
2021 election	25 April 2021	107,781	43.80; 5		9.37% 1	28.11% 3	15.24% 2	0.48% 0	–	–	–	–	3.48%	15.69%

=== Kukës ===
Polling firm	Date	Sample	Alliance for a Great Albania			PS	PSD	Albania Becomes Initiative		PM	Others	Lead
Polling firm	Date	Sample	PD	PDIU	PL	PS	PSD	NTH	LSHB	PM	Others	Lead
Piepoli Italy + Report TV	5 May	–	55.8; 2			38.5% 1	1.3% 0	2.0% 0		1.7% 0	0.6%	17.3%
2021 election	25 April 2021	38,656	62.27; 2		0.17% 0	35.84% 1	0.47% 0	0.12% 0	–	–	1.12%	26.43%

=== Dibër ===
Polling firm	Date	Sample	Alliance for a Great Albania			PS	PSD	Albania Becomes Initiative		PM	Others	Lead
Polling firm	Date	Sample	PD	PDIU	PL	PS	PSD	NTH	LSHB	PM	Others	Lead
Piepoli Italy + Report TV	5 May	–	44.9; 2			45.2% 3	1.5% 0	3.3% 0		4.2% 0	0.7%	0.3%
2021 election	25 April 2021	64,297	45.13; 3		6.91% 0	44.70% 2	0.70% 0	0.15% 0	–	–	2.40%	0.43%

=== Lezhë ===
Polling firm	Date	Sample	Alliance for a Great Albania			PS	Albania Becomes Initiative		PSD	PM	LB	Others	Lead
Polling firm	Date	Sample	PD	PDIU	PL	PS	NTH	LSHB	PSD	PM	LB	Others	Lead
Piepoli Italy + Report TV	5 May	–	47.9; 4			42.1% 3	3.9% 0		0.9% 0	2.6% 0	2.0% 0	0.4%	5.8%
2021 election	25 April 2021	71,702	47.42; 4		10.34% 0	38.03% 3	0.76% 0	–	0.44% 0	–	–	3.02%	9.39%

=== Fier ===
Polling firm	Date	Sample	PS	Alliance for a Great Albania			Albania Becomes Initiative		PSD	PM	LB	KEA	Others	Lead
Polling firm	Date	Sample	PS	PD	PDIU	PL	NTH	LSHB	PSD	PM	LB	KEA	Others	Lead
Piepoli Italy + Report TV	5 May	—	49.7% 9	31.9% 4			10.2% 1		1.0% 0	5.2% 0	1.8% 0	0.1% 0	0.4%	17.8%
Nottosondaggi + News 24 Albania	28 April	—	50.5% 8/9	33.0% 5/6			7.0% 0/1		1.5% 0	5.0% 0/1	0.5% 0	0.5% 0	2.0%	17.5%
Angi Ricerche + ABC News Albania	28 April	—	57.3%	39.5%			3.5%		1.3%	1.7%	1.1%	1.7%	1.4%	17.8%
2021 election	25 April 2021	173,525	52.77% 9	37.27% 6		7.10% 1	0.53% 0	–	0.46% 0	–	–	–	1.87%	18.15%

=== Vlorë ===
Polling firm	Date	Sample	PS	Alliance for a Great Albania			PSD	Albania Becomes Initiative		PM	LB	Others	Lead
Polling firm	Date	Sample	PS	PD	PDIU	PL	PSD	NTH	LSHB	PM	LB	Others	Lead
Piepoli Italy + Report TV	5 May	—	53.7% 8	32.6% 4			0.5% 0	5.4% 0		5.6% 0	1.9% 0	0.3%	21.1%
Nottosondaggi + News 24 Albania	28 April	—	54.0% 7/8	30.5% 3/4			0.5% 0	6.0% 0/1		7.5% 0/1	0.5% 0	1.0%	23.5%
2021 election	25 April 2021	101,924	57.91% 8	31.52% 4		6.08% 0	0.60% 0	0.53% 0	–	–	–	3.35%	26.39%

=== Berat ===
Polling firm	Date	Sample	PS	Alliance for a Great Albania			PSD	Albania Becomes Initiative		PM	Others	Lead
Polling firm	Date	Sample	PS	PD	PDIU	PL	PSD	NTH	LSHB	PM	Others	Lead
Piepoli Italy + Report TV	5 May	—	57.2% 5	26.4% 2			1.0% 0	10.7% 0		3.2% 0	1.2%	30.8%
2021 election	25 April 2021	75,643	55.97% 8	30.44% 4		11.12% 0	0.50% 0	0.42% 0	–	–	1.56%	25.53%

=== Gjirokastër ===
Polling firm	Date	Sample	PS	Alliance for a Great Albania			PSD	Albania Becomes Initiative		PM	Others	Lead
Polling firm	Date	Sample	PS	PD	PDIU	PL	PSD	NTH	LSHB	PM	Others	Lead
Piepoli Italy + Report TV	5 May	—	54.1% 3	34.8% 1			2.6% 0	4.4% 0		3.3% 0	0.8%	19.3%
2021 election	25 April 2021	45,570	53.93% 3	30.66% 1		12.68% 0	1.16% 0	0.38% 0	–	–	1.29%	26.39%

=== Korçë ===
Polling firm	Date	Sample	PS	Alliance for a Great Albania			PSD	Albania Becomes Initiative		PM	LB	KEA	Others	Lead
Polling firm	Date	Sample	PS	PD	PDIU	PL	PSD	NTH	LSHB	PM	LB	KEA	Others	Lead
Piepoli Italy + Report TV	5 May	–	46.2% 5	33.5% 4			3.9% 0	11.0% 1		4.4% 0	0.7% 0	0.1% 0	0.2%	12.7%
Nottosondaggi + News 24 Albania	28 April	—	45.5% 5/6	38.0% 4/5			3.0% 0	6.0% 0		4.5% 0	0.5% 0	1.0% 0	1.5%	7.5%
2021 election	25 April 2021	123,812	48.60% 6	40.77% 5		6.86% 0	1.02% 0	0.58% 0	–	–	–	–	2.17%	7.83%

=== Durrës ===
Polling firm	Date	Sample	PS	Alliance for a Great Albania			Albania Becomes Initiative		PSD	PM	LB	KEA	Others	Lead
Polling firm	Date	Sample	PS	PD	PDIU	PL	NTH	LSHB	PSD	PM	LB	KEA	Others	Lead
Piepoli Italy + Report TV	5 May	–	48.8% 7	33.8% 5			8.5% 1		1.4% 0	6.9% 1	0.3% 0	0.1% 0	0.2%	15.0%
McLaughlin + Top Channel Albania	14–24 April	–	50.0% 8	36.0% 6			4.0% 0		0.1% 0	1.7% 0	0.7% 0	1.7% 0	0.3%	14.0%
Nottosondaggi + News 24 Albania	28 April	—	45.0% 6/7	38.0% 5/6			5.0% 0/1		1.0% 0	7.5% 0/1	2.0% 0	1.0% 0	0.5%	7.0%
2021 election	25 April 2021	152,987	50.26% 8	41.44% 6		6.20% 0	0.44% 0	–	0.43% 0	–	–	–	1.23%	8.82%

=== Leadership polling ===
Polling firm	Fieldwork date	Sample size	Rama PS	Berisha ASHM	Lapaj NISMA–LSHB	Qori LB	Shehi DZh	Shehaj PM	Basha KEA	Doshi PSD	Stojku ADR	Kocaqi AKSH	Osmani LA	Lead
Sonketa & ZL + MCN TV	2 May	–	46.2%	34.4%	6.9%	4.2%	0.9%	3.1%	2.1%	1.7%	0.1%	0.3%	0.1%	11.8%
McLaughlin + Top Channel Albania	14-24 April	1,200	49.2%	33.6%	5.3%	—	—	6.6%	—	—	—	—	—	15.6%
Sonketa & ZL + MCN TV	25 April	10,000	46.6%	33.7%	6.8%	4.2%	1.0%	3.3%	4.2%	0.4%	0%	0.4%	0%	12.9%
MRB Hellas + Euronews Albania	10–21 April	1,600	42.0%	24.1%	8.6%	2.1%	—	7.6%	—	1.0%	—	1.1%	—	17.6%
Sonketa & ZL + MCN TV	18 April	10,000	43.0%	33.4%	6.1%	5.8%	3.5%	4.2%	1.5%	2.2%	0.1%	0.1%	0.1%	9.6%
Sonketa & ZL + MCN TV	11 April	6,800	44.0%	31.6%	6.8%	7.0%	4.0%	3.5%	2.5%	1.0%	0.3%	0.2%	0.1%	12.4%
Piepoli Italy + Report TV	3–8 April	1,000	46.0%	35.0%	—	—	—	—	—	—	—	—	—	11.0%
Eduart Zaloshnja + Report TV	17 October 2024	1,861	51.1%	27.2%	—	—	—	—	—	—	—	—	—	23.9%

=== Seat projections ===
Polling firm	Date	Sample	PS	Alliance for a Great Albania			PSD	Albania Becomes Initiative		PM	LB	KEA	DZh	Others	Lead
Polling firm	Date	Sample	PS	PD	PDIU	PL	PSD	NTH	LSHB	PM	LB	KEA	DZh	Others	Lead
Sonketa + MCN TV	2 May	–	73-77	53-57			3-4	1-2		1	1	1-3	0-1	0	16-24
Sonketa + MCN TV	25 April	10,000	74-75	55–57			3	2		1	1	1	0-1	0	17-20
Sonketa + MCN TV	18 April	6,800	71-75	47-52			3-4	1-2		0-1	1-3	0-1	0-1	0	19-28
Sonketa + MCN TV	11 April	6,800	71-74	49-55			3	1-4		0-3	0-3	0-1	0	0	16-25
2021 election	25 April 2021	1,578,117	74	59		4	3	0	–	–	–	–	–	0	15

== Results ==
Party	Votes	%	Seats	+/–
Socialist Party of Albania	856,177	53.27	83	+9
Democratic Party – Alliance for a Magnificent Albania (Note: Of the 50 seats won by the alliance, the Democratic Party took 41, the Freedom Party 4, the Party for Justice, Integration and Unity 2 and the Republican Party, Environmentalist Agrarian Party and Unity for Human Rights Party took one seat each.)	529,354	32.93	50	–13
Albania Becomes Initiative (LSHB–NTH–LDPSH) (Note: The alliance's single seat was taken by Lëvizja Shqipëria Bëhet)	64,264	4.00	1	New entry
Social Democratic Party of Albania	49,890	3.10	3	0
Opportunity Party	48,995	3.05	2	New entry
Lëvizja Bashkë	24,616	1.53	1	New entry
Euroatlantic Democrats	20,863	1.30	0	New entry
Djathtas për Zhvillim (DJATHTAS–LZHK)	6,019	0.37	0	New entry
Albanian National Alliance	3,787	0.24	0	New entry
Homeland Movement	2,255	0.14	0	New entry
New Democracy Alliance Party	1,127	0.07	0	0
Total	1,607,347	100.00	140	0
Valid votes	1,607,347	96.54		
Invalid/blank votes	57,526	3.46		
Total votes	1,664,873	100.00		
Registered voters/turnout	3,713,897	44.83		
Source: KQZ

Seat distribution
PS	59.29%
PD—ASHM	35.71%
PSD	2.14%
PM	1.43%
NShB	0.71%
LB	0.71%

Party share
PS	53.26%
PD—ASHM	32.94%
NShB	4.00%
PSD	3.10%
PM	3.05%
LB	1.53%
KEA	1.30%
Others	0.82%

=== Results by county ===
Party vote share by county
County	PS	PD – ASHM	PSD	NISMA–LSHB	PM	LB	KEA	DZh	Others	Turnout
Berat	60.68% 5	27.25% 2	0.35% 0	7.22% 0	2.14% 0	1.22% 0	0.56% 0	0.07% 0	0.59% 0	39.55%
Dibër	56.67% 3	37.11% 2	2.13% 0	1.60% 0	0.67% 0	0.50% 0	1.06% 0	0.03% 0	0.22% 0	50.10%
Durrës	53.41% 8	37.48% 6	0.26% 0	2.96% 0	2.61% 0	1.27% 0	0.87% 0	0.64% 0	0.50% 0	40.53%
Elbasan	61.42% 10	27.83% 4	2.14% 0	4.12% 0	2.14% 0	1.01% 0	1.59% 0	0.27% 0	0.39% 0	42.13%
Fier	64.35% 12	23.53% 4	1.39% 0	5.08% 0	2.54% 0	1.17% 0	0.67% 0	0.79% 0	0.47% 0	42.03%
Gjirokastër	64.30% 3	27.08% 1	0.91% 0	3.62% 0	1.48% 0	1.36% 0	0.46% 0	0.44% 0	0.36% 0	39.23%
Korcë	55.87% 6	32.63% 4	2.20% 0	4.77% 0	2.15% 0	0.91% 0	0.89% 0	0.19% 0	0.38% 0	40.99%
Kukës	30.39% 1	53.63% 2	13.34% 0	0.88% 0	0.76% 0	0.38% 0	0.24% 0	0.11% 0	0.27% 0	46.15%
Lezhë	43.32% 3	43.41% 4	2.71% 0	6.16% 0	1.21% 0	0.55% 0	2.30% 0	0.12% 0	0.21% 0	41.40%
Shkodër	37.92% 4	40.36% 5	15.77% 2	2.00% 0	1.31% 0	0.62% 0	1.71% 0	0.11% 0	0.20% 0	36.78%
Tiranë	48.29% 19	34.48% 13	3.10% 1	3.47% 1	4.96% 2	2.81% 1	1.89% 0	0.43% 0	0.58% 0	48.85%
Vlorë	60.44% 9	24.49% 3	1.40% 0	5.87% 0	5.01% 0	1.24% 0	0.69% 0	0.33% 0	0.51% 0	31.45%

== Aftermath ==
=== Domestic reactions ===
Sali Berisha, opposition leader and chairman of the Alliance for a Magnificent Albania, refused to recognize the outcome of the election, and called for a protest on 16 May.

=== International reactions ===
Rama and the Socialist Party's (PS) victory generated several responses from international dignitaries:

- Azerbaijan – President Ilham Aliyev congratulated Rama on the PS's victory under his leadership and expressed confidence in the further strengthening of friendly ties.
- France – President Emmanuel Macron congratulated Rama on his victory, stating that France would always stand alongside Albania on the country's European path.
- Germany – Chancellor Friedrich Merz congratulated Rama on his re-election and looked forward to continuing the co-operation between the two countries and attending the upcoming European Political Community summit in Tirana.
- Hungary – Prime Minister Viktor Orbán congratulated Rama on a landslide victory and looked forward to the "historic" EPC summit in Tirana.
- Italy – Prime Minister Giorgia Meloni extended her congratulations to Rama on his and the government's reelection. In addition to the recent strengthening of the two countries' "deep friendship and strategic cooperation", Meloni also noted that work will continue to further consolidate bilateral relations and achieve common goals.
- Spain – Prime Minister Pedro Sánchez congratulated Rama on the PS's "decisive" victory and noted the Albanian public's overwhelming support for the country's efforts to join the European Union.
- Croatia – Prime Minister Andrej Plenković congratulated Rama on the election victory and looked forward to strengthening bilateral relations.
- Ukraine – President Volodymyr Zelenskyy congratulated Rama on the PS's "decisive" victory and further praised the country's commitment to a lasting peace for Ukraine, alongside looking forward to strengthening the two countries' friendly relations.
- United Arab Emirates – President Mohamed bin Zayed Al Nahyan congratulated Rama on the result of the election and supported expanding collaboration.
- United Kingdom – Prime Minister Keir Starmer congratulated Rama on his re-election and looked forward to continuing their work together to deliver for working people in both their countries.

==== Organizations ====
- European Union – President of the European Commission Ursula von der Leyen congratulated Rama on the election victory.

=== Conduct ===
OSCE stated that "elections to Albania's parliament were competitive and professionally managed, the authorities rose to the challenge of organising out-of-country voting for the first time and candidates could mostly campaign freely, but they were marked by widespread misuse of public resources and institutional power by the ruling party PS, while numerous reports of pressure on public employees and other voters as well as cases of intimidation were of concern."

Some Albanian citizens in Greece claimed they never received their ballots, despite reports of large volumes of completed ballots arriving from the country. PS activists were accused of involvement in these alleged irregularities.

The CEC suspended the counting of ballots from Greece after the request from the Democratic Party officials. However then they resumed the counting, with the head of CEC declaring the Democratic Party offered no proof of fraud. The Democratic Party still continues to contest the decision.
