= Luçiano Boçi =

Albanian politician (born 1967)

Luçiano Boçi MP
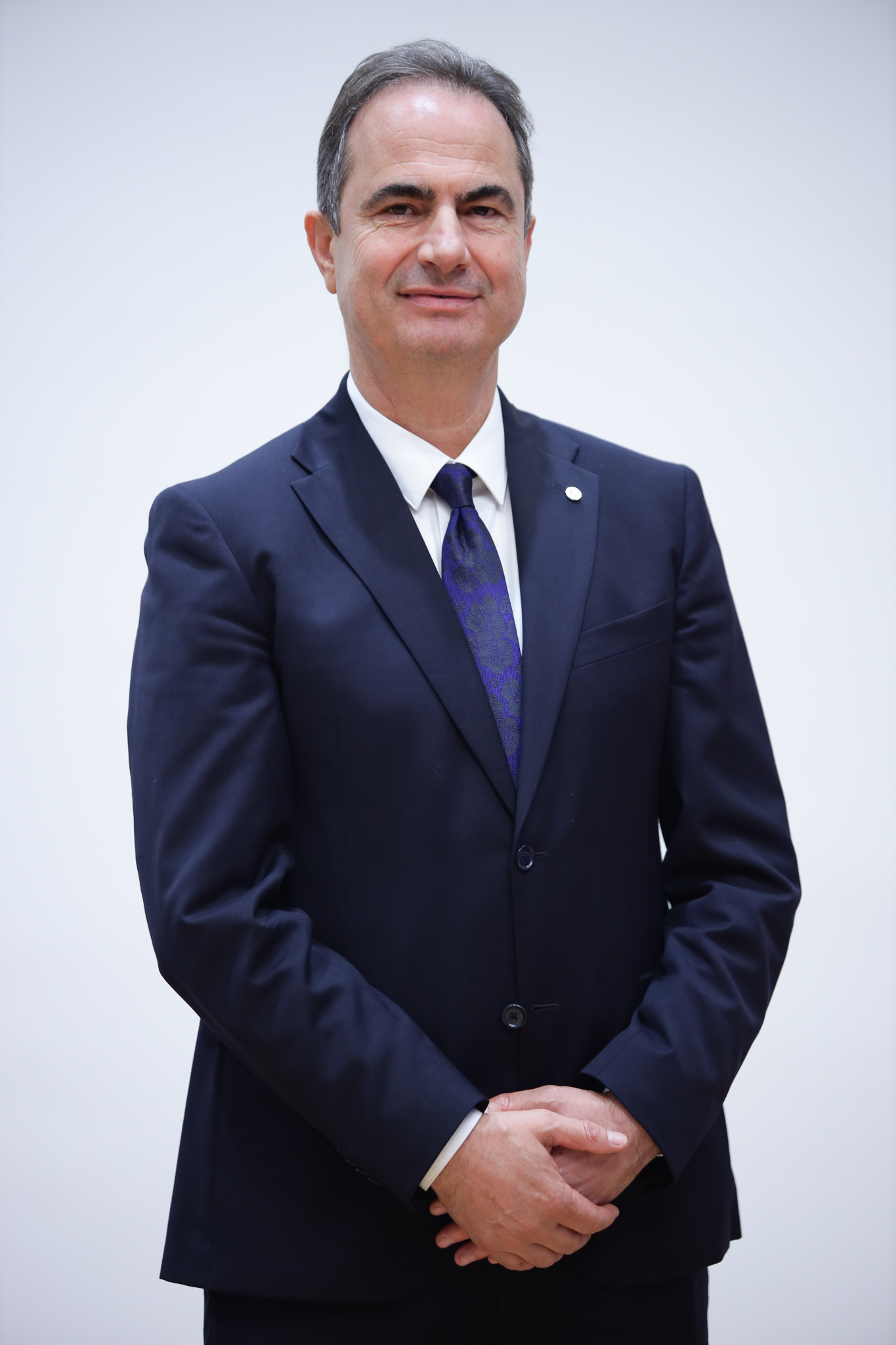

Member of the Albanian Parliament for Elbasan
- Incumbent
- Assumed office September 10, 2021

Personal details
- Born: 26 March 1967 (age 59) Elbasan
- Party: Democratic
- Education: University of Elbasan; University of Tirana

Luçiano Boçi is a member of the Assembly of the Republic of Albania for the Democratic Party of Albania. Luciano Boçi is currently the chairman of the parliamentary group of the Democratic Party of Albania.

== Early life and Politics ==
Boçi born on 26 March 1967 in Elbasan he started out his career as a Professor from 1989 to 1991 at the University of Elbasan. From 1991 to 2009 as a Pedagog at the university. Eventually Boçi was given the role as Deputy to the Rector of the university and Chief of his department up until 2009 when he began his career as a member of Parliament from 2009 until 2017 and again from 2021. Boçi during the 2021 election campaigning had been caught on video fighting with a Socialist campaigner in Elbasan accusing him of vote buying, which caused Boçi to get into an altercation with the accuser. Boçi has been critical against Enkelejd Alibeaj and Gazment Bardhi. Both Alibeaj and Boçi are in a dispute between each other over Parliamentary leadership of PD. Boçi and Alibeaj both claim they lead the group of PD. Since the dispute has continued Berisha is considered the De facto leader of PD and Alibeaj the De jure. Since the party is split into five groups it is uncertain who is the official group leader of the Democratic party of Albania.
