= Dashamir Shehi =

Albanian politician (born 1957)

- Dashamir Shehu

Deputy Prime Minister
- In office 4 December 1994 – 10 July 1996
- President: Sali Berisha
- Preceded by: Bashkim Kopliku
- Succeeded by: Tritan Shehu

Minister of Labor, Immigration, Social Support and Former Political Persecuted Persons
- In office 13 April 1992 – 3 December 1994
- President: Sali Berisha
- Prime Minister: Aleksandër Meksi
- Preceded by: Office established
- Succeeded by: Engjëll Dakli

Minister of Construction and Tourism
- In office 4 December 1994 – 10 July 1996
- President: Sali Berisha
- Prime Minister: Aleksandër Meksi
- Preceded by: Ilir Manushi; Edmond Spaho
- Succeeded by: Albert Brojka

Member of Albanian Parliament
- In office 10 September 2021 – 8 July 2025
- Constituency: Tirana County
- In office 9 September 2013 – 8 May 2017
- Constituency: Tirana County
- In office 3 September 2001 – 20 May 2005
- In office 6 April 1992 – 15 May 1997

Leader of the Movement for National Development
- In office 17 July 2002 – 21 May 2025

Personal details
- Born: 28 October 1957 (age 68) Tirana, Albania
- Party: LZHK (2004-present)
- Other political affiliations: PDR (2001-2004); PD (1991-1997)
- Profession: Economist, Politician

Dashamir Shehi (born 28 October 1957) is an Albanian politician and economist, who has previously held different government positions including serving as Minister of State of Albania.

== Biography ==
From 1976 to 1980, he attended the Faculty of Agrarian Economics at ILB Kamëz. From 1982 to 1984, he worked as an economist in Mirditë. From 1987 to 1990, he was an economist in the forestry enterprise in Tirana.

In 1991 he was appointed secretary of the Democratic Party in Tirana. From 1992 to 1997, he served as a deputy and from 1993 to 1996, he was a member of the Presidency of the DP. From 1992 to 1994, he served as Minister of Labor, Social Support and Former Political Persecuted and from 1994 to 1996, he served as Deputy Prime Minister and Minister of Construction and Tourism. In 1997, he left the Democratic Party, after a memorandum in which he proposed the resignation of the government, at the height of the 1997 crisis.

He left the PD and was no longer a member of Parliament for four years. During this time, he became involved in the political formation "United Right", which included several right-wing parties, including the PR. Since this party did not last long, in 2001 he became part of the New Democratic Party.

On July 17, 2002, he created and became chairman of the Renewed Democratic Party, which later changed its name to the Movement for National Development (LZHK), as it is known to this day. In 2005, Leka I., executive chairman of the Movement for National Development (LZHK), became chairman of this force after the July 3 elections, while Leka Zogu declared that he no longer had any connection with this coalition. In 2007, he was a candidate for the LZHK in the by-elections in Tirana. In 2009, he joined the right-wing coalition "Poli i Lirisë".

In 2013, he participated in the elections in alliance with the Democratic Party of Albania and became a member of parliament. Later, in 2017, he failed to be elected as a member of parliament, and in 2021, again in alliance with the Democratic Party, he managed to be elected as a member of parliament.

In 2025, he will not be in alliance with the Democratic Party, because in 2024 together with the government, they passed an electoral law that does not give small parties any hope of entering the parliament. Saying that "they are dirty and since the 2009 elections", this election code that this law was passed by both major parties.

In the parliamentary elections 2025, he led the coalition Djathtas për Zhvillim, but failed to win any seats. He resigned from leadership of DZh and LZHK on 21 May 2025.
