= List of mayors of Shkodër =

This is a list of mayors of Shkodër who have served since the Albanian Declaration of Independence of 1912.

== Mayors (1912–present) ==
No.	Name	Term in office	
1	Muharrem Gjylbegu	1912	1916
2	Musa Juka	1916	1920
3	Muhamet Gjyrezi	1924	1924
4	Kol Mjeda	1924	1925
5	Mehmet Shpuza	1925	1925
6	Rrustem Ymeri	1928	1929
7	Izet Dibra	1929	1930
8	Zenel Prodani	1930	1931
9	Rrustem Ymeri	1931	1933
10	Zenel Prodani	1933	1937
11	Ndoc Çoba	1937	1939
12	Mark Karrakiqi	1939	1942
13	Zef Shiroka	1942	1943
14	Loro Suma	1943	1943
15	Zef Gjeta	1943	1944
Executive Committee (1944–1992)
16	Dhimitër Bojaxhiu	1944	1945
17	Shyqyri Hafizi	1949	1949
18	Luigj Shala	1960	1964
19	Hilmi Nurja	1970	1973
20	Agim Dardha	1986	1989
Pluralism (1992–present)
21	Filip Guraziu	1992	1996
22	Bahri Boriçi	1996	2000
23	Ormir Rusi	2000	2003
24	Artan Haxhi	2003	2007
25	Lorenc Luka	2007	2015
26	Voltana Ademi	2015	2022
27	Bardh Spahia	2022	2023
28	Benet Beci	2023	Incumbent
