= Erisa Xhixho =

Albanian politician

Member of the Albanian Parliament
- Incumbent
- Assumed office 10 September 2021
- Constituency: Tirana County

Personal details
- Born: 11 May 1985 (age 41) Tirana, Albania
- Party: LSI (2004–2022); PL (2022–present)
- Education: University of Tirana

Erisa Xhixho (born 11 May 1985) is an Albanian politician and deputy for the Freedom Party of Albania. She has also served as vice-president of LSI, later PL, since 2009. She is among the co-founders of LSI in 2004.
