= Luljeta Bozo =

Albanian engineer, professor, and politician (born 1942)

Member of the Albanian Parliament
- In office 2021–2025
- President: Ilir Meta → Bajram Begaj
- Prime Minister: Edi Rama

Personal details
- Born: Luljeta Bozo; 2 October 1942 (age 83) Tirana, Albania
- Party: Socialist Party of Albania
- Spouse: Todi Bozo
- Children: Petri Bozo
- Education: University of Tirana (PhD in Civil Engineering)
- Occupation: Engineer, professor, politician

Luljeta Bozo (born 2 October 1942) is an Albanian civil engineer, professor and politician. She has published 33 professional books in the fields of engineering, science, and geotechnics, and is chair of the Albanian Geotechnical Society.

== Early life and education ==
Bozo graduated with a degree in Civil Engineering from the University of Tirana in 1965 and earned her doctorate in 1989. She received the academic titles of Candidate of Sciences (1981), Docent (1984), and Doctor of Sciences (1989). In 1994, she was appointed Professor, and in 2018 she received the title Professor Emeritus. Between 1985 and 1986, she pursued postgraduate studies in Paris.

== Academic and professional career ==
During her over 50-year career, Bozo has held several academic and administrative roles, including:

- Professor at the Faculty of Civil Engineering
- Head of the Department of Structures
- Head of the Geotechnical Sector
- Deputy Dean of the Faculty of Civil Engineering
- Member of the Scientific Council of the University of Tirana
- Member of the Senate of the University of Tirana
- Member of the State Committee for High Dams
- Member of the Scientific Council of the Ministry of Construction

Since 2010, she has been teaching at POLIS University in Tirana.

Bozo has been a member of the American Association for the Advancement of Science since 2011 and is also associated with the Albanian Academy of Arts and Sciences.

After the 26 November 2019 earthquake, she was frequently cited in media coverage on building safety and geotechnics.

In the 2021 parliamentary elections, Bozo was elected to the Parliament of Albania on the ticket of the Socialist Party of Albania, heading the list for Tirana.

== Research interests ==
- Environmental geotechnics
- Soil mechanics
- Foundation engineering
- Engineering geology
- Environmental education
- Rock mechanics
- Soil dynamics

== Publications ==
Bozo has authored several professional publications, including:

- Laboratory Work and Soil Mechanics Exercises (1975)
- Soil and Rock Mechanics (1983–1984, co-author)
- Foundation Engineering (1984, 1994)
- Soil Dynamics (2004)
- Road Geotechnics (2010)
- Experimental Geotechnics (2011)
- Stability of Artificial and Natural Slopes (2018)
