= Tomor Alizoti =

Albanian politician of the DP

Member of the Albanian Parliament
- Incumbent
- Assumed office 2021

Deputy Chairman of the Foreign Affairs Committee
- Incumbent
- Assumed office 2021

Personal details
- Born: December 6, 1976 (age 49) Lushnje, Albania
- Party: Democratic Party of Albania
- Education: University of Tirana
- Occupation: Politician, diplomat
- Profession: Diplomat, politician
- Known for: Member of Parliament, former diplomat

Tomor Alizoti (born December 6, 1976, in Lushnje) is an Albanian politician and a member of the Democratic Party. Since 2021, he has been a member of the Albanian Parliament and the deputy chairman of the Foreign Affairs Committee. Alizoti is a former diplomat at the Albanian Embassy in Germany.

== Life ==
Tomor Alizoti was born on December 6, 1976, in Lushnje, Albania. He is great-grandson of Fejzi Alizoti who served as interim prime minister of Albania (1916-1918), he was executed later by Communist regime in 1945 falsely accused as Axis collaborator.Tomor Alizoti spent his childhood as part of interned family in Lushnjë. From 1997 till 2001 he studied German studies in Tirana. After his studies, he worked as a diplomat at the Albanian Embassy in Germany before transitioning into politics.

== Diplomatic career ==
Before entering Albanian politics, Alizoti served as a diplomat at the Albanian Embassy in Germany. In addition, he is an alumnus of the Diplomatic Academy of the Foreign Ministry.

== Political career ==
Since 2021, Alizoti has been a member of the Albanian Parliament for the Democratic Party. Within the parliament, he serves as the deputy chairman of the Committee on Foreign Affairs.

In February 2024, Alizoti was part of an Albanian parliamentary delegation that visited the U.S. Congress. During this trip, he met with U.S. Congressmen Tim Walberg and John Moolenaar to discuss the challenges and opportunities for cooperation between Albania and the USA as well as the political situation.

In May 2024, he criticized the trivialization of these crimes in parliament and demanded respect for the victims of communism.
