= Enkelejd Alibeaj =

Albanian politician

Minister of Justice
- In office 24 November 2007 – 17 September 2009
- Prime Minister: Sali Berisha
- Preceded by: Aldo Bumçi
- Succeeded by: Bujar Nishani

Member of the Albanian Parliament
- In office 10 September 2021 – 8 July 2025
- Constituency: Fier County
- In office 9 September 2017 – 20 February 2019
- Constituency: Fier County
- In office 7 September 2009 – 25 May 2013
- Constituency: Fier County

Leader of the Djathtas 1912
- Incumbent
- Assumed office 12 October 2024

Personal details
- Born: September 11, 1973 (age 53)
- Party: Djathtas 1912 (2024-present)
- Other political affiliations: Democratic Party (2005-2024)

Enkelejd Alibeaj (born September 11, 1973) is a former member of the Albanian parliament. He was the minister of justice in Albania from 2005 to 2009. He was a member of the Democratic Party of Albania from 2005 to 2024. In October 2024, he founded the political party Djathtas 1912, where he currently serves as its leader.

== Political career ==
In the years 2005–2007, Alibeaj served as the Director of the Department of Internal Administrative Control and Anticorruption at the Council of Ministers. The appointment in this position is the direct competence of the Prime Minister and the department he led constitutes an important and efficient structure of the administrative investigation of the activity of the state administration, having concrete results and appreciated by the internal opinion and international organizations. During these years he has represented the Council of Ministers in court cases before the Constitutional Court.

Alibeaj was engaged in academic activities as a lecturer in the subject "Constitutional Law" at several universities and has contributed to a number of activities and academic publications in the field of law.

Alibeaj had participated in a number of seminars, conferences, activities and training courses abroad related to criminal procedural law (Italy, Poland), human rights (Strasbourg), judicial reform (Bulgaria) or in the field of anti-corruption.

In the years 2000–2003, he served as the executive director of a non-profit organization in the field of law "Institute of Democratic Studies" with the object of his activity being studies in the field of law and preparation of legislation. He has also been engaged by the OSCE - Presence in Albania as one of the best local experts in the field of election systems and legislation.

From 2007 to 2009 Alibeaj served as minister of Justice in the Berisha I Government.

Following a vote on 11 December 2021, held at Arena Kombëtar where 4,446 members voted for the removal of Lulzim Basha as leader of the Democratic Party, Basha resigned on 21 March 2022. Afterward, Alibeaj was given leadership roles within the party by Basha's faction. However, some have speculated that Alibeaj's actions are influenced by Basha, with critics suggesting that Basha may still hold sway over him. Meanwhile, Sali Berisha and his faction disputed Alibeaj's leadership, with Berisha claiming the position of party leader. This ongoing division has led to internal conflict, particularly around who would represent the party in the upcoming local elections.

The Commissioner of the Central Election Commission also commented, controversially suggesting it might be better if neither faction registered. Despite this, both Alibeaj and Berisha announced intentions to run their own candidates in the local elections, creating uncertainty over which would be recognized as the official Democratic Party candidates.

On 3 March 2023, a trial in Tirana resulted in Alibeaj being affirmed as leader of the Democratic Party of Albania, while Berisha held a large-scale protest in Tirana on the same day. Later, on 17 May 2023, Alibeaj officially resigned from all his posts within the Democratic Party.
