= Ledina Aliolli =

Albanian politician

Ledina Alolli

Member of the Albanian parliament
- In office 2009–2013

Personal details
- Party: Democratic Party
- Website: ledinaaliolli.com/

Ledina Alolli was a member of the Assembly of the Republic of Albania for the Democratic Party of Albania.
