= Dashnor Sula =

Albanian politician

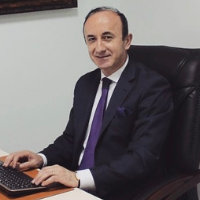
- Dashnor Sula

Inspector General of the General Inspectorate
- Incumbent
- Assumed office 6 February 2026
- Preceded by: Shkëlqim Hajdari

Member of the Albanian Parliament
- In office 10 September 2021 – 8 July 2025
- Constituency: Elbasan County

Member of the Albanian Parliament
- In office 2 September 2005 – 25 May 2013
- Constituency: Elbasan County (2009–2013); Peqin (2005–2009)

Personal details
- Born: 14 March 1969 (age 57) Peqin, PR Albania
- Party: Independent
- Other political affiliations: Democratic Party of Albania (2005–2025)
- Spouse: Elida Magani Sula (m. 1994)
- Children: Paola Sula and Silvio Sula
- Parent(s): Riza Sula and Refije Sula
- Education: University of Tirana

Dashnor Sula (born 14 March 1969) is an Albanian politician and jurist who has served as Inspector General of the General Inspectorate of Albania since 6 February 2026. He previously served as a member of the Assembly of Albania from 2005 to 2013 and again from 2021 to 2025, representing Elbasan County. He was affiliated with the Democratic Party of Albania until 2025. He was affiliated with the Democratic Party of Albania until 2025.

== Early life and education ==
Dashnor Sula was born in Peqin, on 14 March 1969 to Riza Sula and Refije Sula. He was raised in Peqin and continued his studies there until he finished high school. Afterwards he moved to Tirana to continue his studies. He did his bachelor in law at the University of Tirana and his master's in criminal law.

== Career ==
- 1992-1993: Attorney at the prosecutor's office of Peqin
- 1993-1996: Attorney at the prosecutor's office of Elbasan
- 1996-1998: Attorney at the prosecutor's office of Tirana
- 1998-1998: Attorney at the prosecutor's office of Gjirokastër
- 1999-2000: Attorney at the general prosecutor's office; Supreme Court.
- 2002-2005: Attorney at the general prosecutor's office regarding organized crimes.
- 2005-2013: Member of Albanian Parliament.
- 2021–present: Member of Albanian Parliament.

== Other works ==
Dashnor Sula has also taken the lawyer licence and he still continues to practice his profession.

== Personal life ==
He has been married to Elida Magani Sula since 1994 and they have two children, Paola Sula and Silvio Sula.
