= Djathtas për Zhvillim =

Political coalition in Albania

Right for Development (Albanian: Djathtas për Zhvillim, DZh) is an Albanian political coalition in 2025 parliamentary election consisting of two parties of centre-right and right-wing spectrum. It is led by Dashamir Shehi.
