= Agron Gjekmarkaj =

Albanian politician, academic and publicist (born 1974)

Member of the Albanian Parliament
- Incumbent
- Assumed office 25 September 2021
- Constituency: Lezhë

Deputy Speaker of the Parliament of Albania
- Incumbent
- Assumed office 18 October 2022

Personal details
- Born: 21 May 1974 (age 52) Lezhë, PSR Albania
- Party: Democratic Party of Albania
- Education: University of Tirana; La Sapienza University of Rome
- Profession: Academic, publicist, politician

Agron Gjekmarkaj (born 21 May 1974) is an Albanian politician, academic and publicist. He serves as a Member of the Parliament of Albania representing the Democratic Party of Albania for the constituency of Lezhë. He currently holds the position of Deputy Speaker of the Parliament of Albania.

== Early life and education ==
Gjekmarkaj was born in Lezhë, Albania on 21 May 1974. He graduated from the Faculty of History and Philology at the University of Tirana in 1996 with a degree in language and literature. In 2005, he completed his studies in literary theory at the Faculty of Literature and Philosophy of the Sapienza University of Rome.

== Academic and professional career ==
After completing his studies, Gjekmarkaj began teaching at the University of Tirana, where he has lectured in the Faculty of History and Philology. He holds the academic title of “Doctor of Sciences.” Alongside his academic work, Gjekmarkaj has been active as a publicist and journalist since the mid-1990s. He served as editor of the cultural magazine Hylli i Dritës and as editor-in-chief of the newspaper Ora e Shqipërisë in 1996. From 2004 onward, he has contributed as a columnist and opinion writer to several Albanian daily newspapers, including Panorama, where he remains a regular editorialist. Between 2000 and 2005, he collaborated with the Albanian-language newspaper Bota Shqiptare in Rome and with Vatican Radio as a consultant and editorial contributor.

== Public service ==
From 2005 to 2007, Gjekmarkaj served as Advisor to the Minister of Culture on cultural policy. Between 2007 and 2008, he headed the Directorate of Arts and Literature at the Ministry of Culture, Youth and Sports. He was also a member of the National Literary Awards Jury from 2007 to 2010 and served on the Scientific Council of the National Library of Albania between 2006 and 2008. From 2008 to 2009, he held the position of Assistant to the President of the Republic.

== Political career ==
Gjekmarkaj was elected to the Parliament of Albania in the 2021 general elections, representing the Lezhë constituency for the Democratic Party of Albania. He currently serves as Deputy Speaker of the Parliament and is an active member of the Democratic Party’s parliamentary group.

== Publications ==
Gjekmarkaj has published a number of scholarly and literary works, including:

- La letteratura fantastica di Kadare (2012)
- Kështu foli At Zef Pllumi me gazetarët (2009)
- Reaksionari (2015)
