= Homeland Movement (Albania) =

Political party in Albania

Homeland Movement Lëvizja Atdheu
- Abbreviation: LA
- Leader: Kreshnik Osmani
- Founded: 2004
- Headquarters: Tirana
- Ideology: Right-wing populism
- Political position: Right-wing to far-right Formerly: Center to centre-right
- Colours: Maroon

Website
- levizjaatdheu.al

The Homeland Movement (Albanian: Lëvizja Atdheu) is a political party in Albania. It is led by Kreshnik Osmani.

== Politics ==
The main point of the party is as follows:

"Albania will gradually become the modern state of law, where life and property are guaranteed by law, the integrated natural way pan democratic in space, a bridge between East and West through traditional Adriatic-Ionian corridor, connecting factor between Europe and Mediterranean countries, an important factor of peace, stability and progress in the Balkans and integrated with great dignity in the family of Euro-Atlantic area."
