= 2025 Albanian local elections =

- 9 November 2025
- Turnout: 18.72% ▼

Partial local elections were held on 9 November 2025 in five municipalities of Albania, following vacancies in local offices. The elections recorded the lowest voter turnout in Albania’s history, at 18.72%.

A Tirana mayoral election had initially been planned but was later cancelled following a ruling by the Constitutional Court, which reinstated the incumbent Erion Veliaj, currently under arrest, as the legitimate Mayor of Tirana. The court annulled his dismissal by the Tirana Municipal Council, the Council of Ministers, and President Bajram Begaj.

== Summary of Municipal Elections ==
County	Municipality	Population (2023)	Outgoing mayor - Party	Elected mayor - Party	Votes	%	Total votes	Turnout
Vlorë	Vlorë (details)	83,683	Ermal Dredha (PS)	Brunilda Mersini (PS)	15,672	78.44%	19,980	12.27%
Berat	Berat (details)	62,232	Ervin Demo (PS)	Ervin Ceca (PS)	13,050	83.35%	15,657	19.82%
Gjirokastër	Tepelenë (details)	6,761	Tërmet Peçi (PS)	Gramos Sako (PS)	3,261	77.85%	4,189	33.84%
Dibër	Mat (details)	17,405	Agron Malaj (PS)	Altin Bojni (PS)	7,425	66.54%	11,158	39.29%
Elbasan	Cërrik (details)	25,163	Andis Salla (PS)	Florenc Doka (PS)	6,201	66.22%	9,364	24.60%

== Municipal elections ==
=== Tirana ===
2025 Tirana Mayoral Election
- Cancelled
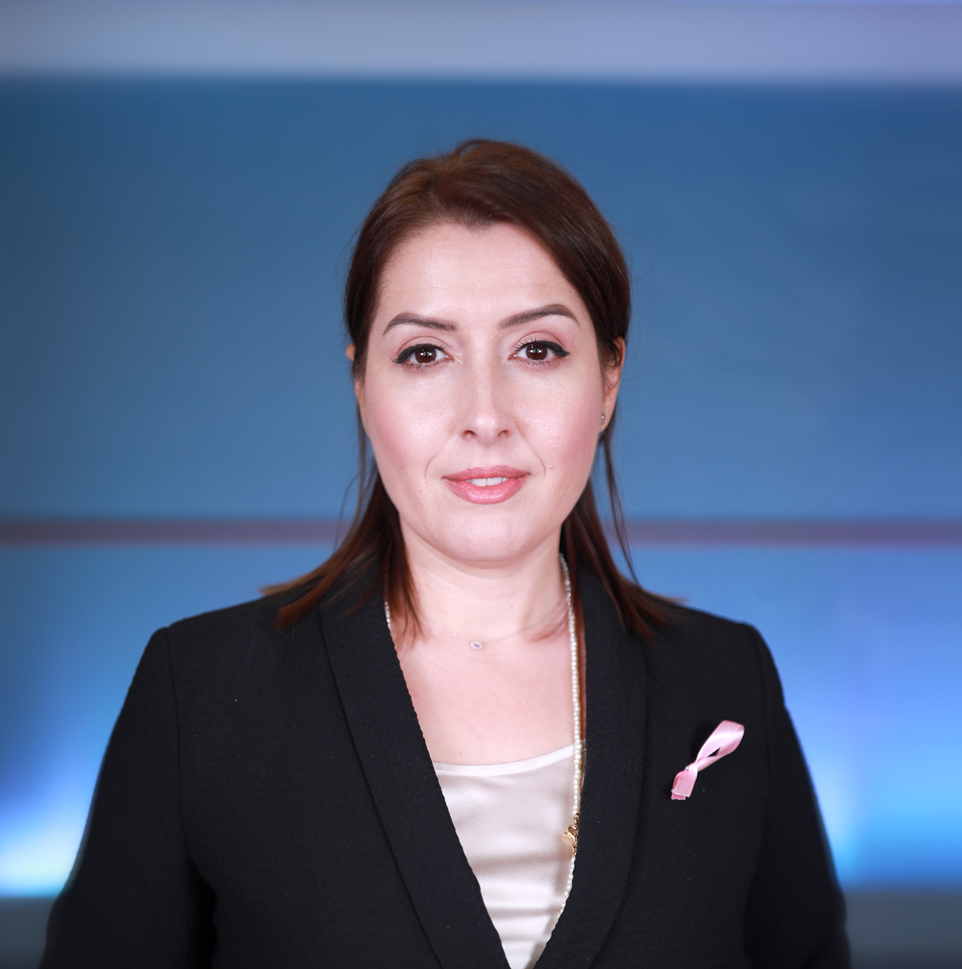

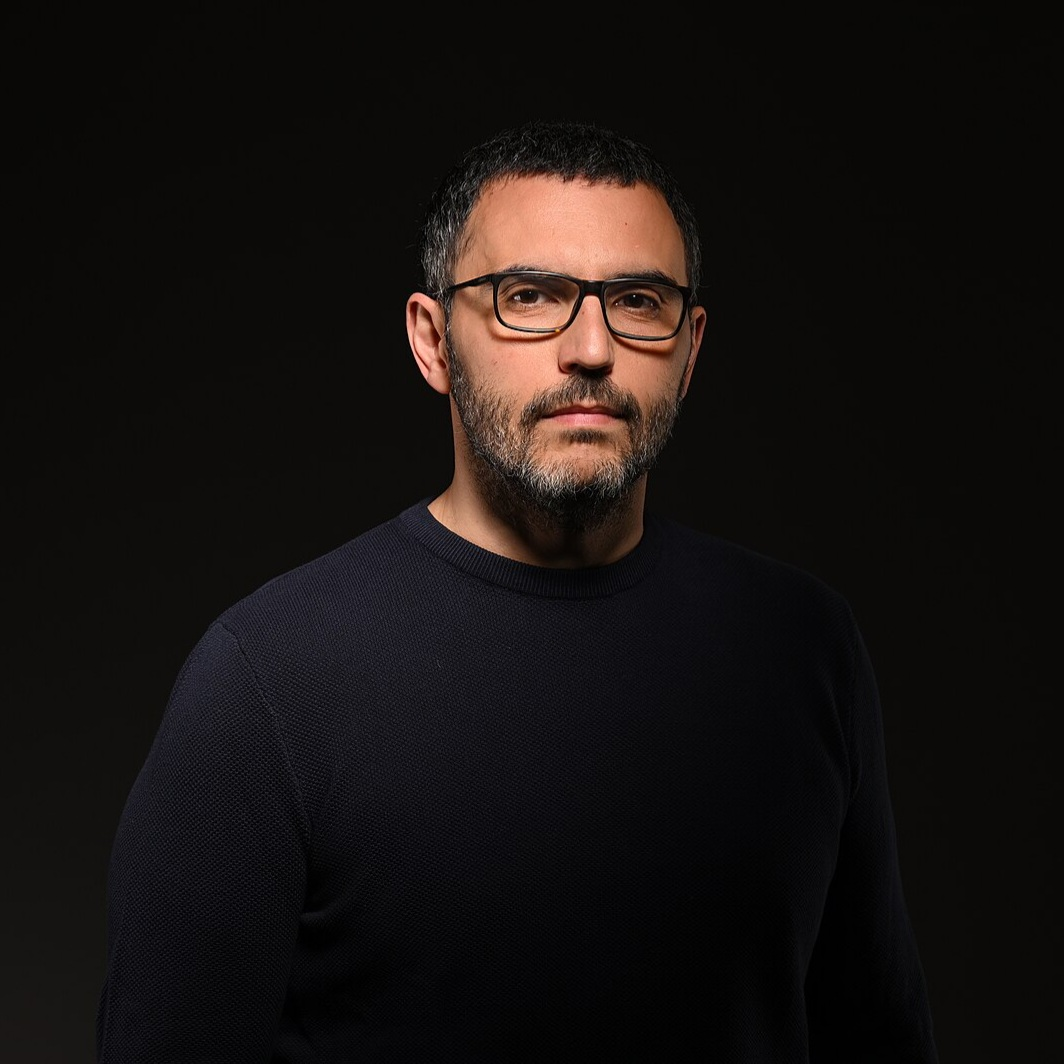
		IND
Candidate	Ogerta Manastirliu	Florjan Binaj	Arlind Qori
Party	Socialist Party	Independent	Together Movement
Alliance		Supporters: Democratic Party-ASHM; Opportunity Party; Albania Becomes Movement; Hashtag Initiative; Independents
	PPSHR
Candidate	Marko Dajti
Party	Reorganised Party of Labour of Albania

On 11 September, the current Prime Minister and Socialist Party leader Edi Rama officially announced Ogerta Manastirliu as his party’s candidate for mayor of Tirana, calling for the dismissal of incumbent Erion Veliaj and a by-election.

On 26 September, the Tirana Municipal Council voted to dismiss incumbent mayor Erion Veliaj from office as a result of his seven-month absence due to his arrest.

On 1 October, President Bajram Begaj decreed 9 November 2025 as the date of by-elections in six municipalities following vacancies.

On 2 October, Veliaj’s lawyers filed an appeal with the Constitutional Court against President Begaj’s decree.

On 3 October, Arlind Qori announced his candidacy for mayor with the Together Movement.

On 6 October, the Democratic Party, Freedom Party, Opportunity Party, Albania Becomes Movement, Hashtag Initiative, and other movements agreed to back independent candidate Florjan Binaj.

On 7 October, far-left candidate Marko Dajti announced his candidacy.

On 9 October, the Constitutional Court unanimously decided to refer the case of petitioner Erion Veliaj to a public plenary session on 31 October and to suspend the presidential decree insofar as it sets the date of the elections in the Municipality of Tirana.

On 3 November, the Constitutional Court reinstated the incumbent Erion Veliaj, currently under arrest, as the legitimate Mayor of Tirana. The court annulled his dismissal by the Tirana Municipal Council, the Council of Ministers, and President Bajram Begaj, and consequently, the planned Tirana Mayoral Election was cancelled.

=== Vlora ===
On 10th September, mayor Ermal Dredha resigned from his position as mayor of Vlora. He won the municipality by 70.55% in 2023, defeating the Bashkë Fitojmë candidate who got only 29.45%.

On 7th October, the Socialist Party selected Brunilda Mersini, an incumbent deputy for the Vlora County, as their candidate. On the same date, the independent candidate backed by the opposition, Dionis Sota announced candidacy.

On 30th October, Gjergji Nika became the third candidate to run for the city after a decision of the Electoral College.

==== Results ====
2025 Vlorë Mayoral by-election
Party	Candidate	Votes	%
PS	Brunilda Mersini	15,672	78.44%
Independent	Dionis Sota (Note: Supporters: Democratic Party-ASHM, Opportunity Party, Albania Becomes Movement, Hashtag Initiative, Independents.)	2,333	11.68%
Independent	Gjergji Nika (Note: Nika ran as an Euroatlantic Democrats candidate in the last parliamentary elections.)	1,975	9.88%
Total votes		19,980	100.0
Turnout			12.27%
PS hold			

=== Berat ===
2025 Berat Mayoral by-election
Party	Candidate	Votes	%
PS	Ervin Ceca	13,050	83.35%
Independent	Pavlo Shkarpa (Note: Supporters: Democratic Party-ASHM, Opportunity Party, Albania Becomes Movement, Hashtag Initiative, Independents.)	2,607	16.65%
Total votes		15,657	100.0
Turnout			19.82%
PS hold			

=== Tepelena ===
2025 Tepelena Mayoral by-election
Party	Candidate	Votes	%
PS	Gramos Sako	3,261	77.85%
Independent	Gabriel Guma (Note: Supporters: Democratic Party-ASHM, Opportunity Party, Albania Becomes Movement, Hashtag Initiative, Independents.)	928	22.15%
Total votes		4,189	100.0
Turnout			33.84%
PS hold			

=== Mat ===
2025 Mat Mayoral by-election
Party	Candidate	Votes	%
PS	Altin Bojni	7,425	66.54%
Independent	Eduart Brahilika (Note: Supporters: Democratic Party-ASHM, Opportunity Party, Albania Becomes Movement, Hashtag Initiative, Independents.)	3,184	28.54%
Independent	Suzana Pasha (Note: Pasha is the current Chairwoman of the Socialist Party Women's Forum in Mat. She ran as an independent after expressing dissatisfaction with the official PS candidate.)	549	4.92%
Total votes		11,158	100.0
Turnout			39.29%
PS hold			

=== Cërriku ===
2025 Cërrik Mayoral by-election
Party	Candidate	Votes	%
PS	Florenc Doka	6,201	66.22%
Independent	Amarildo Hoxha (Note: Supporters: Democratic Party-ASHM, Opportunity Party, Hashtag Initiative, Independents.)	1,888	20.16%
LSHB	Eligert Hima	1,275	13.62%
Total votes		9,364	100.0
Turnout			24.60%
PS hold			

== Opinion polls ==
=== Tirana ===
Polling firm	Polling dates	Sample	Ogerta Manastirliu	Florjan Binaj	Arlind Qori	Marko Dajti	Lead
Notosondaggi + News24 Albania	25 – 28 October 2025	—	42% – 46%	40% – 44%	11.5% – 13.5%	0.5% – 2.5%	2.0%
