= 2023 Albanian local elections =

2023 Albanian Local Elections
- 14 May 2023
- Turnout: 38.28% (▲15.31 pp)

Local elections were held on 14 May 2023 in Albania. Mayors and municipal council seats were being elected in each of Albania's 61 municipalities.

== Background ==
The 2019 Albanian local elections were boycotted, leading to the Socialists running uncontested in 31 municipalities. Only Shkodër and Finiq were won by opposition candidates, with all other mayors being candidates of the Socialist Party. According to official figures, turnout in 2019 was 22.97% or 812,249 people. The opposition stated that, according to their calculations, only 534,528 people took part, which means that the turnout was 15.12%. The elections were declared as a "farce" by opposition leader Lulzim Basha at the time.

Sali Berisha and Ilir Meta officially met on 26 October 2022 to plan for the upcoming elections. Both Meta and Berisha planned to have primaries in order to select joint candidates for each municipality, while the Socialist Party planned to run alone without any electoral alliance. However, since the Democratic Party was split between Enkelejd Alibeaj and Sali Berisha, it was uncertain who would carry the name of the party on the ballot. Belind Këlliçi announced he would be challenging Erion Veliaj in Tirana as Berisha's candidate, while Alibeaj did not announce a candidate in Tirana.

On 25 January 2023, Berisha's agreement with Vangjel Dule was revealed. According to the agreement, the PBDNJ would run their candidates in Finiq, Dropull and Himarë. By the end of January, it was still not clear whether the PS would run alone or with a coalition. Edi Rama stated that his party had selected a candidate for every region besides Vlorë and Durrës.

Ilirjan Celibashi, the head of the Central Election Commission, stated that neither Enkelejd Alibeaj nor Sali Berisha were allowed to register their candidates as the Democratic party of Albania before the deadline was on 7 March, meaning that the PD would not be allowed to run in the upcoming local elections.

In February 2023, controversy formed around the alleged connections between prime minister Edi Rama and Charles McGonigal, who was believed to be connected with Russian oligarch Oleg Deripaska, and was also separately indicted for allegedly accepting payments from former Albanian intelligence agent Agron Neza.

On 3 March 2023, the Democratic Party of Albania was given to Enkelejd Alibeaj. Originally, the Tirana Courts had originally accepted Sali Berisha's appeal. However, on 11 March 2023, Alibeaj was not allowed to register the Democratic Party with the CEC, allegedly for lack of proper documentation. In fact, it appeared that Lulzim Basha was still the leader of the party, even though Basha had declared his resignation in March 2022. However, Basha had never finalized his resignation in any written source. Alibeaj announced he would appeal against the decision of the CEC.

Berisha's candidates were not allowed to register as the Democratic Party, but instead under the list of Ilir Meta's party. On 15 March 2023, Berisha and Meta announced that their coalition would be called Bashkë Fitojmë ("Together we win"). It would consist of the PBDNJ, the Freedom Party of Albania, Demochristian Party, and the majority of the PD. Several Alibeaj's candidates would ultimately resign or endorse Berisha's candidates.

== By-elections of March 2022 ==
After the results of the 2019 elections, by-elections were announced on March 6, 2022, as at the time there was no elected mayor in Vorë, Dibër, Shkodër, Lushnjë, Rrogozhine and Durrës. Several candidates that had been elected in June 2019 had not taken office either due to their death, or they had been arrested on corruption charges.

Between the 2019 elections and the March 2022 by-elections, Sali Berisha had been expelled from the PD by the party's leadership. However, he had previously personally conducted a party congress in which participants had deposed the party leadership of Lulzim Basha.

In the partial elections of the aforementioned six municipalities, a candidate from the Democratic Party and a Berisha candidate ran alongside a candidate from the Socialist Party. The Berisha loyalist candidates ran under the coalition name Shtëpia e Lirisë ("House of Freedom"). In all communities, House of Freedom candidates received significantly more votes than the official PD representatives. Berisha's candidate managed to win in Shkodër, while the rest of the municipalities were won by the Socialist Party.

In the three voting stations of Bruçaj, Ndrejaj and Palaj, small villages in the northern mountains of Albania, elections were not held due to bad weather from heavy snowfall causing power cuts.

Results from the partial election
Municipality	Turnout	Winner	Political party	PS	PD	SHeL
Vorë	41.04%	Blerim Shera	Socialist Party	69.39%	6.29%	24.33%
Dibër	41.99%	Rahim Spahiu	Socialist Party	60.82%	19.28%	19.46%
Lushnjë	35.88%	Eriselda Sefa	Socialist Party	58.80%	10.43%	30.77%
Shkodër	28.05%	Bardh Spahia	House of Freedom	39.51%	16.82%	43.67%
Durrës	26.57%	Emiriano Sako	Socialist Party	58.47%	11.85%	29.68%
Rrogozhinë	28.45%	Edison Memolla	Socialist Party	60.73%	21.96%	17.31%

== Parties and coalitions ==
Number	Party	Acronym	Chairman	Coalition
1	Together We Win Coalition (Note: Coalition led by Berisha-led PD faction, PL, PBDNJ, PDK)	BF	Sali Berisha and Ilir Meta	Bashkë Fitojmë
2	Socialist Party of Albania	PS	Edi Rama	Aleanca për Shqipërinë Europiane
3	Environmentalist Agrarian Party	PAA	Agron Duka	–
4	Republican Party of Albania	PRSH	Fatmir Mediu	–
5	Legality Movement Party	PLL	Shpëtim Axhami	–
6	Social Democracy Party of Albania	PDS	Paskal Milo	–
7	Right Liberal Alliance (Note: Coalition led by Artur Roshi which consists of PBKD, BLD, PBD)	ALD	Artur Roshi	Aleanca Liberale e Djathë
8	Social Democratic Party of Albania	PSD	Tom Doshi	–
9	Democratic Party of Albania	PD	Enkelejd Alibeaj	–
10	Movement for National Development	LZHK	Dashamir Shehi	–
11	New Democratic Spirit	FRD	Sali Shehu	–
12	Party for Justice, Integration and Unity	PDIU	Shpëtim Idrizi	–
13	Party of Europeanisation and Integration of Albania	PEISH	Rivelino Çuno	–
14	Democratic Alliance	AD	Eduard Abazi	–
15	Democratic Conviction	BD	Astrit Patozi	–
16	Party for the Protection of the Rights of Immigrants of Albania	PMDE	Ymer Kurti	–
17	National Arbnore Alliance	AAK	Gjet Ndoj	–
18	National Front Party	PBK	Adriatik Alimadhi	–
19	Party Alliance for Democracy and Solidarity	ADS	Gaqo Apostoli	–
20	Albanian Labor Movement	PLPSH	Genci Sakaj	–
21	Left Front	FM	Marko Dajti	–
22	Party of Albanian National Unity	PUK	Idajet Beqiri	–
23	Green Party of Albania	PGJ	Edlir Petanaj	–
24	Conservative Party	KONS	Bashkim Murati	–
25	New Movement Party	LRE	Arian Galdini	–
26	Alliance for Equality and European Justice	ABDE	Valentino Mustaka	–
27	National Conservative Party of Albania	PKKA	Kujtim Gjuzi	–
28	Party Defending the Rights of Albanian Workers	PMDPSH	Kadri Isufaj	–
29	Macedonian Alliance for European Integration	AMIE	Vasil Sterjovski	Aleanca për Shqipërinë Europiane
30	Albanian Emigration Party	PESh	Kostaq Papa	–
31	Albanian Democratic Reforms Party	PRDSh	Krenar Rryci	–
32	Communist Party of Albania	PKSH	Qemal Cicollari	–
33	Albanian Time Party	POSH	Zef Shtjefni	–
34	Christian Democratic Party of Albania	PKD	Dhimiter Muslia	–
35	Hashtag Initiative	NTH	Endri Shabani	–
36	Together Movement	BASHKË	Arlind Qori	–
37	Ethnic Greek Minority for the Future	MEGA	Kristo Kiço	–
38	Christian Democratic Alliance of Albania	ADK	Zef Bushati	–
39	Albanian Demochristian League	LDK	Mhil Gecaj	–
40	Albanian Future Party	PASH	Emin Subashi	–

== Polls ==
Tirana

Pollster	Date	PS	BF	PD	LB	PDIU	Lead
EuroNews Albania	February 2023	68.5%	31.5%	—	—	—	37.0%
EuroNews Albania	17 March 2023	65.8%	34.2%	—	—	—	31.6%
EuroNews Albania	14 April 2023	55.5%	37.8%	1.8%	1.0%	0.3%	17.7%
2023 Election	14 May 2023	54.69%	34.58%	4.27%	4.77%	0.73%	20.11%

== Mayoral results ==
Elections were held in every municipality in Albania, including prior ones from 2022. The results are as follows:

County	City	Elected Mayor - Party	Alliance
Berat	Berat	Ervin Demo (PS)	Aleanca për Shqipërinë Europiane
Berat	Kuçova	Kreshnik Hajdari (PS)	Aleanca për Shqipërinë Europiane
Berat	Poliçan	Adriatik Zotkaj (PS)	Aleanca për Shqipërinë Europiane
Berat	Skrapar	Adriatik Mema (PS)	Aleanca për Shqipërinë Europiane
Berat	Dimal	Juliana Memaj (PS)	Aleanca për Shqipërinë Europiane
Dibër	Bulqizë	Festime Mjeshtri (PS)	Aleanca për Shqipërinë Europiane
Dibër	Dibër	Rrahim Spahiu (PS)	Aleanca për Shqipërinë Europiane
Dibër	Klos	Valbona Kola (PS)	Aleanca për Shqipërinë Europiane
Dibër	Mat	Agron Malaj (PS)	Aleanca për Shqipërinë Europiane
Durrës	Durrës	Emiriana Sako (PS)	Aleanca për Shqipërinë Europiane
Durrës	Krujë	Artur Bushi (PS)	Aleanca për Shqipërinë Europiane
Durrës	Shijak	Elton Arbana (PS)	Aleanca për Shqipërinë Europiane
Elbasan	Belsh	Arif Tafani (PS)	Aleanca për Shqipërinë Europiane
Elbasan	Cërrik	Andis Salla (PS)	Aleanca për Shqipërinë Europiane
Elbasan	Elbasan	Gledian Llatja (PS)	Aleanca për Shqipërinë Europiane
Elbasan	Gramsh	Besion Ajazi (PS)	Aleanca për Shqipërinë Europiane
Elbasan	Librazhd	Mariglen Disha (PS)	Aleanca për Shqipërinë Europiane
Elbasan	Peqin	Bukurosh Maçi (PS)	Aleanca për Shqipërinë Europiane
Elbasan	Përrenjas	Nuri Belba (PS)	Aleanca për Shqipërinë Europiane
Fier	Divjakë	Josif Gorrea (PS)	Aleanca për Shqipërinë Europiane
Fier	Fier	Armando Subashi (PS)	Aleanca për Shqipërinë Europiane
Fier	Lushnjë	Eriselda Sefa (PS)	Aleanca për Shqipërinë Europiane
Fier	Mallakastër	Qerim Ismailaj (PS)	Aleanca për Shqipërinë Europiane
Fier	Patos	Fatjon Duro (PS)	Aleanca për Shqipërinë Europiane
Fier	Roskovec	Majlinda Bufi (PS)	Aleanca për Shqipërinë Europiane
Gjirokastër	Dropull	Dhimitraq Toli (PS)	Aleanca për Shqipërinë Europiane
Gjirokastër	Gjirokastër	Flamur Golemi (PS)	Aleanca për Shqipërinë Europiane
Gjirokastër	Këlcyra	Kelmet Ndoni (PS)	Aleanca për Shqipërinë Europiane
Gjirokastër	Libohovë	Leonard Hide (PS)	Aleanca për Shqipërinë Europiane
Gjirokastër	Memaliaj	Albert Malaj (PL)	Bashkë Fitojmë
Gjirokastër	Përmet	Alma Hoxha (PS)	Aleanca për Shqipërinë Europiane
Gjirokastër	Tepelena	Termet Peçi (PS)	Aleanca për Shqipërinë Europiane
Korcë	Devoll	Eduard Duro (PS)	Aleanca për Shqipërinë Europiane
Korcë	Kolonja	Erion Isaj (PS)	Aleanca për Shqipërinë Europiane
Korcë	Korça	Sotiraq Filo (PS)	Aleanca për Shqipërinë Europiane
Korcë	Maliq	Gezim Topçiu (PS)	Aleanca për Shqipërinë Europiane
Korcë	Pogradec	Ilir Xhakolli (PS)	Aleanca për Shqipërinë Europiane
Korcë	Pustec	Pali Kolefeski (PS)	Aleanca për Shqipërinë Europiane
Kukës	Has	Miftar Dauti (PD)	Bashkë Fitojmë
Kukës	Kukës	Safet Gjici (PS)	Aleanca për Shqipërinë Europiane
Kukës	Tropojë	Rexhe Byberi (PS)	Aleanca për Shqipërinë Europiane
Lezhë	Kurbin	Majlinda Cara (PS)	Aleanca për Shqipërinë Europiane
Lezhë	Lezhë	Pjerin Ndreu (PS)	Aleanca për Shqipërinë Europiane
Lezhë	Mirditë	Albert Mëlyshi (PD)	Bashkë Fitojmë
Shkodër	Fushë-Arrëz	Hil Curri (PD)	Bashkë Fitojmë
Shkodër	Malësia e Madhe	Tonin Marinaj (PS)	Aleanca për Shqipërinë Europiane
Shkodër	Pukë	Rrok Dodaj (PD)	Bashkë Fitojmë
Shkodër	Shkodër	Benet Beci (PS)	Aleanca për Shqipërinë Europiane
Shkodër	Vau i Dejës	Kristian Shkreli (PS)	Aleanca për Shqipërinë Europiane
Tiranë	Kamëz	Rakip Suli (PS)	Aleanca për Shqipërinë Europiane
Tiranë	Kavajë	Fisnik Qosja (PD)	Bashkë Fitojmë
Tiranë	Rrogozhinë	Edison Memolla (PS)	Aleanca për Shqipërinë Europiane
Tiranë	Tirana	Erion Veliaj (PS)	Aleanca për Shqipërinë Europiane
Tiranë	Vorë	Blerim Shera (PS)	Aleanca për Shqipërinë Europiane
Vlorë	Delvinë	Besmir Veli (PS)	Aleanca për Shqipërinë Europiane
Vlorë	Finiq	Romeo Çakuli (MEGA)	–
Vlorë	Himarë	Dhionisios Alfred Beleri (Note: As indicated on the KQZ website) (PD)	Bashkë Fitojmë
Vlorë	Konispol	Ergest Duli (PS)	Aleanca për Shqipërinë Europiane
Vlorë	Sarandë	Oltian Çaçi (PS)	Aleanca për Shqipërinë Europiane
Vlorë	Selenicë	Nertil Bellaj (PS)	Aleanca për Shqipërinë Europiane
Vlorë	Vlorë	Ermal Dredha (PS)	Aleanca për Shqipërinë Europiane

Results from the partial election
Date	Municipality	Turnout	Winner	Socialist Party	Together We Win
23 July 2023	Rrogozhinë	36.15%	Edison Memolla (PS)	57.58%	42.42%
24 September 2023	Kukës	45.29%	Albert Halilaj (PS)	63.67%	36.33%
4 August 2024	Himarë	37.61%	Vangjel Tavo (PS)	58.62%	41.38%

== Municipal council results ==
All council seats were being elected.

County	Municipality	Seats						Largest party	Total council seats
County	Municipality	PS	BF	PD	PSD	PAA	Other parties and Independents	Largest party	Total council seats
Berat	Berat	20	7	3	0	0	1	PS	31
Berat	Dimal	11	3	4	1	1	1	PS	21
Berat	Kuçovë	18	8	3	1	0	1	PS	31
Berat	Poliçan	13	1	1	0	0	0	PS	15
Berat	Skrapar	8	5	0	1	0	1	PS	15
Dibër	Bulqizë	9	3	1	0	1	7	PS	21
Dibër	Dibër	13	5	1	6	1	5	PS	31
Dibër	Klos	6	2	1	0	0	12	PS	21
Dibër	Mat	9	2	2	3	1	4	PS	21
Durrës	Durrës	28	13	5	1	3	1	PS	51
Durrës	Krujë	11	5	2	2	3	8	PS	31
Durrës	Shijak	12	4	2	1	1	1	PS	21
Elbasan	Belsh	10	2	3	1	0	5	PS	21
Elbasan	Cërrik	11	3	2	1	1	3	PS	21
Elbasan	Elbasan	28	12	7	1	0	3	PS	51
Elbasan	Gramsh	6	2	1	1	0	11	PS	21
Elbasan	Librazhd	13	3	1	1	0	3	PS	21
Elbasan	Peqin	9	4	3	1	1	3	PS	21
Elbasan	Përrenjas	9	3	2	3	0	4	PS	21
Fier	Divjakë	18	5	4	1	1	2	PS	31
Fier	Fier	33	7	4	5	0	2	PS	51
Fier	Lushnjë	24	7	4	2	1	3	PS	41
Fier	Mallakastër	9	1	3	1	1	6	PS	21
Fier	Patos	16	3	1	0	0	1	PS	21
Fier	Roskovec	12	7	0	0	0	2	PS	21
Gjirokastër	Dropull	15	3	0	0	0	3	PS	21
Gjirokastër	Gjirokastër	21	5	2	1	0	2	PS	31
Gjirokastër	Këlcyrë	3	1	1	1	1	8	PS	15
Gjirokastër	Libohovë	8	5	2	0	0	0	PS	15
Gjirokastër	Memaliaj	7	3	2	1	1	1	PS	15
Gjirokastër	Përmet	9	1	1	2	0	2	PS	15
Gjirokastër	Tepelenë	11	1	1	1	0	1	PS	15
Korçë	Devoll	9	4	2	0	1	5	PS	21
Korçë	Kolonjë	10	2	0	0	2	1	PS	15
Korçë	Korçë	23	9	2	1	2	4	PS	41
Korçë	Maliq	20	6	2	2	0	1	PS	31
Korçë	Pogradec	19	5	2	0	2	3	PS	31
Korçë	Pustec	5	4	0	1	1	4	PS	15
Kukës	Has	4	3	1	2	2	9	PS	21
Kukës	Kukës	4	4	1	2	3	17	PS	31
Kukës	Tropojë	4	4	0	1	1	11	PS	21
Lezhë	Kurbin	9	6	1	3	1	11	PS	31
Lezhë	Lezhë	9	6	2	7	1	16	PS	41
Lezhë	Mirditë	4	2	2	4	1	8	PS	21
Shkodër	Fushë-Arrëz	2	1	1	3	3	5	PSD	15
Shkodër	Malësi e Madhe	6	3	3	8	3	8	PSD	31
Shkodër	Pukë	2	1	1	4	0	7	PSD	15
Shkodër	Shkodër	18	13	5	12	0	3	PS	51
Shkodër	Vau i Dejës	7	7	3	10	1	3	PSD	31
Tirana	Kamëz	19	11	3	2	1	5	PS	41
Tirana	Kavajë	13	9	3	2	3	1	PS	31
Tirana	Rrogozhinë	9	4	3	2	0	3	PS	21
Tirana	Tiranë	34	15	4	3	0	5	PS	61
Tirana	Vorë	13	4	0	0	2	2	PS	21
Vlorë	Delvinë	8	3	1	3	0	0	PS	15
Vlorë	Finiq	7	5	2	1	0	6	PS	21
Vlorë	Himarë	9	7	1	1	0	3	PS	21
Vlorë	Konispol	7	3	1	0	0	4	PS	15
Vlorë	Sarandë	12	4	3	0	1	11	PS	31
Vlorë	Selenicë	8	1	2	2	2	6	PS	21
Vlorë	Vlorë	33	9	3	0	1	5	PS	51
Total	—	757	291	123	116	52	274	—	1,613

Full results by party/coalition:

Party/Coalition	Leader	Votes	Percentage of Votes	Seats
Socialist Party of Albania	Edi Rama	579,614	43.11%	757
Together We Win (Note: Coalition led by Berisha-led PD faction, PL, PBDNJ, PDK)	Sali Berisha	247,880	18.44%	291
Democratic Party of Albania	Enkelejd Alibeaj	103,719	7.71%	123
Social Democratic Party of Albania	Tom Doshi	86,281	6.42%	116
Environmentalist Agrarian Party of Albania	Agron Duka	44,047	3.28%	52
Albanian Republican Party	Fatmir Mediu	32,070	2.39%	34
Party for Justice, Integration and Unity	Shpëtim Idrizi	28,977	2.16%	25
Legality Movement Party	Shpëtim Axhami	23,683	1.76%	21
Green Party of Albania	Edlir Petanaj	16,326	1.21%	20
Progressive Alliance (Note: Coalition led by Dashamir Shehi)	Dashamir Shehi	22,906	1.70%	19
Social Democracy Party	Paskal Milo	21,798	1.62%	18
National Arbnore Alliance	Gjet Ndoj	11,680	0.87%	18
New Democratic Spirit	Sali Shehu	18,458	1.37%	17
Coalition “Right Liberal Alliance” (Note: Coalition led by Artur Roshi which consists of PBKD, BLD, PBD)	Artur Roshi	16,858	1.25%	13
Democratic Alliance of Albania	Eduard Abazi	6,129	0.46%	10
Albanian Future Party	Emin Subashi	6,963	0.52%	8
Christian Democratic Party	Dhimiter Muslia	6,211	0.46%	8
Greek Ethnic Minority for the Future Party	Kristo Kiço	2,275	0.17%	8
Independent candidates	–	7,165	0.53%	7
Hashtag Initiative	Endri Shabani	10,804	0.80%	5
National Front Party	Adriatik Alimadhi	7,611	0.57%	5
Christian Democratic Alliance of Albania	Zef Bushati	6,373	0.47%	5
Party Alliance for Democracy and Solidarity	Gaqo Apostoli	4,647	0.35%	5
National Unity Party	Idajet Beqiri	5,592	0.42%	4
Democratic Conviction	Astrit Patozi	4,226	0.31%	4
National Conservative Party of Albania	Kujtim Gjuzi	1,881	0.14%	4
Macedonian Alliance for European Integration	Vasil Sterjovski	439	0.03%	3
Party of Albanian Democratic Reforms	Skender Halili	1,383	0.1%	2
Albanian Labour Movement	Genci Sakaj	546	0.04%	2
Together Movement	Arlind Qori	7,539	0.56%	1
Conservative Party	Bashkim Murati	2,767	0.21%	1
Alliance for Equality and European Justice	Valentino Mustaka	1,125	0.08%	1
New Movement	Arian Galdini	966	0.07%	1
Communist Party of Albania	Qemal Cicollari	914	0.07%	1
Party for the Defence of the Rights of the Emigrants	Ymer Kurti	886	0.07%	1
Left Front	Marko Dajti	270	0.02%	1

== Reactions ==
Edi Rama and the PS was able to keep control on a majority of municipalities and thanked voters for entrusting him. However, the opposition claimed election misconduct, stating that they were not allowed to count ballots in every district. Berisha and other members of the opposition argued it was unfair to have given the opposition an odd number of vote counters. Together We Win was only allowed to count ballots in 50% of the country. Vote buying was the biggest accusation from the opposition. Workers of every municipality had shown up on election day waiting outside every polling station.

Opposition groups also claimed that in the three districts that did use an electronic voting system, Vorë, Kamëz, and Elbasan, there were failures in the electronic identification system. Some workers also claimed that they voted for an opposition candidate, only for their vote to show up for the Socialist candidate. The CEC has argued that this is not possible. Several political groups of the opposition argued the electronic voting system violated the election codes.

On 16 June 2023, the elected mayor for Kukës, Safet Gjici, resigned following a leaked sex tape in the municipal office. He was caught with a female worker giving him oral sex. He resigned effective immediately, which caused a by-election to be held.

The Council of Europe stated that the elections were "well-administered, lacked women as candidates and in administration, and lacked focus on local issues"

On 5 March 2024, mayor-elect of Himarë Dhionisios Alfred Beleri, who had been arrested on 12 May 2023, two days before the election, was sentenced to two years in prison for alleged vote buying. The previous mayor, Jorgo Goro, continued to serve his term in the meantime, as Beleri was not allowed to complete his oath to be sworn in as mayor.

On 23 March 2024, Jorgo Goro was himself arrested by SPAK for corruption.

On 4 August 2024, Vangjel Tavo was the candidate of the Socialist Party for the repeat elections in the municipality of Himarë and won his opponent, Petro Gjikuria, who was supported by the coalition of the opposition Together We Win.
