= 2025–2026 Albanian opposition protests =

Opposition protests in Albania

2025-2026 Albanian opposition protests
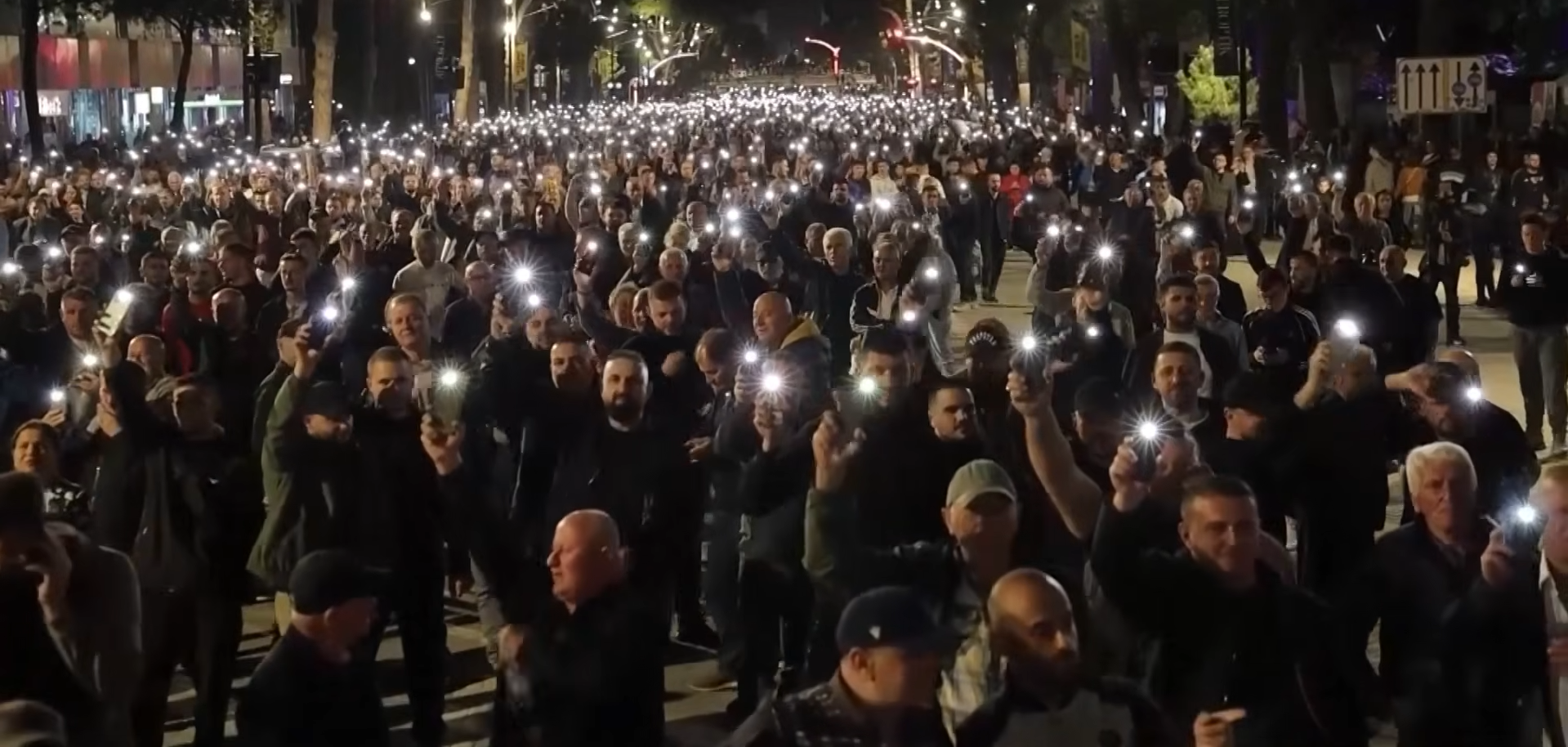
- PD protesters on 17 April 2026, at the Dëshmorët e Kombit Boulevard
- Date: 17 November 2025 – 8 May 2026 (5 months, 3 weeks and 1 day)
- Location: Tirana, Albania (Note: A protest by LB was also held in Durrës.)
- Caused by: Corruption scandals involving Deputy Prime Minister Belinda Balluku; Alleged election fraud in the 2025 election
- Goals: Resignation of Edi Rama and the Rama government; Snap elections; Technocratic government
- Methods: Demonstrations; Sit-in; Civil disobedience; Rioting; Marches
- Result: No political changes; inconclusive.: Party-led protest campaign superseded by the broader, citizen-led Flamingo Revolution, which received support from all major parliamentary opposition parties.

Parties
Albanian opposition: Democratic Party; Freedom Party; Republican Party; Democratic National Front Party; Demochristian Party; National Conservative Party; Shqipëria Bëhet (Note: Berisha publicly applauded and endorsed SHB's protests, while its leader Adriatik Lapaj remained cautious but open to joining PD.); Supported by: Unity for Human Rights Party; Environmentalist Agrarian Party; Legality Movement Party	Left-wing protesters and activists: Lëvizja Bashkë; Various activists and citizens	Government of Albania: Socialist Party; State Police; FNSH; Shqiponjat; RENEA

Lead figures
Sali Berisha; Flamur Noka; Luçiano Boçi; Agron Gjekmarkaj; Gazment Bardhi; Xhelal Mziu; Klevis Balliu Adriatik Lapaj	Arlind Qori; Redi Muçi	Edi Rama; Belinda Balluku (Note: Suspended) (Note: Until 26 February 2026); Albana Koçiu; Besfort Lamallari; Toni Gogu; Ermal Nufi

Number
Thousands of protesters (estimate) Dozens of activists (SHB)	Hundreds of protesters and activists (estimate)	1500 police officers

The 2025–2026 Albanian opposition protests were a series of anti-government civic actions in Albania, primarily in Tirana, against Prime Minister Edi Rama and the Rama government. The larger context for the protests was the allegations, levied by the opposition, of irregularities in the 2025 Albanian parliamentary election. Protests became more intense after corruption proceedings involving Deputy Prime Minister and Minister of Infrastructure Belinda Balluku. The Democratic Party and its allies demanded Rama's resignation, a technocratic government and new elections, while other political movements, such as Shqipëria Bëhet and Lëvizja Bashkë, organized their own anti-government demonstrations.

The protests varied in scale from small gatherings in front of the Prime Minister's Office and the Parliament building, to larger marches and violent confrontations with police. Escalations included the use of Molotov cocktails, fireworks, flares and pyrotechnics against police or public buildings, while police responded in some cases with tear gas, water cannons and barriers. Many demonstrators, including minors, have been injured, arrested, and prosecuted.

Following the final demonstration on 8 May, the party-led protests evolved into the citizen-led Flamingo Revolution, focused on opposing the current leadership in general, which began later that month and received support from all major parliamentary opposition parties while staying independent of party affiliation.

== Background ==
=== 2025 parliamentary election ===
In May 2025, Prime Minister Edi Rama and the Socialist Party won a fourth consecutive term in the 2025 Albanian parliamentary election. The result was disputed by the opposition, led by former prime minister Sali Berisha, which alleged vote buying, misuse of state resources and irregularities in the diaspora vote. International observers described the elections as competitive and professionally managed, but also reported that contestants did not enjoy a level playing field and cited concerns over misuse of public resources, pressure on public employees, intimidation, vote buying and ballot secrecy.

The Democratic Party framed the election result as illegitimate and used the post-election period to call for anti-government mobilization. Berisha and other opposition figures linked their protests to wider accusations of corruption, state capture and the concentration of power under Rama.

=== Belinda Balluku corruption case ===
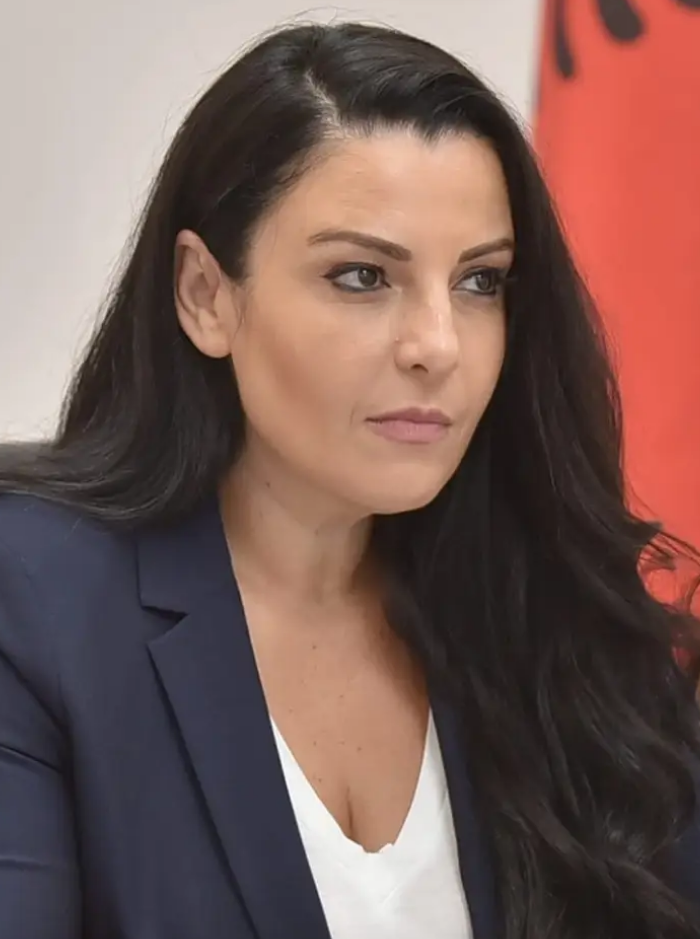
Balluku in 2023

In October 2025, Albania's Special Prosecution Against Corruption and Organized Crime opened proceedings against Deputy Prime Minister and Minister of Infrastructure Belinda Balluku over alleged violations of public procurement rules, including tenders connected to the Llogara Tunnel and other infrastructure projects. Prosecutors alleged that Balluku had interfered in the awarding of public contracts worth more than €200 million; Balluku denied wrongdoing.

In November 2025, the Special Court suspended Balluku from public office and imposed restrictions on her movement while the case continued. Rama initially criticized the suspension and announced plans to limit the judiciary's ability to suspend ministers under investigation, a proposal criticized by the opposition as an attempt to weaken judicial independence. On 26 February 2026, Rama dismissed Balluku as part of a cabinet reshuffle while the corruption investigation continued.

=== Other political disputes ===
During the same period, opposition parties also criticized government policies on public spending, social inequality, infrastructure projects, and the adoption of a new gender equality law. In November 2025, Parliament adopted a new Gender Equality Law that expanded protections against discrimination and included provisions related to gender identity. Opposition figures criticized parts of the law, arguing that it conflicted with traditional family values.

== Timeline ==
=== Protests by the Democratic Party and Shqipëria Bëhet ===
==== November 2025 ====
17 November 2025: The Democratic Party held a protest in front of the Prime Minister's Office under the slogan "Let's save Albania", demanding accountability over the Balluku case and broader corruption allegations. The turnout was reported as low compared with later demonstrations.

==== December 2025 ====
8 December 2025 – 25 March 2026: Adriatik Lapaj, leader of Shqipëria Bëhet, began a sit-in protest in front of the Prime Minister's Office. The protest lasted 108 days and was presented by the movement as a non-party civic action against corruption and misgovernance. During the protest period, Lapaj and other activists were subjected to criminal proceedings.

18 December 2025: Opposition lawmakers, mainly from the Democratic Party, disrupted a parliamentary session amid escalating tensions over the Balluku case and other corruption allegations. They occupied ministerial seats, scuffled with guards and set off flares inside Parliament.

22 December 2025: Thousands of protesters gathered on Dëshmorët e Kombit Boulevard and near the Prime Minister's Office. The protest followed corruption charges related to Balluku and other officials, and demonstrators called for government accountability. The protest included incidents involving Molotov cocktails, one of which reportedly injured a participant. Four people were arrested.

==== January 2026 ====
24 January 2026: Thousands of protesters gathered in front of the Prime Minister's Office. Demonstrators threw Molotov cocktails and fireworks toward the building, while police maintained a large security presence. The protest followed recent controversies, including a fire at the "5 Maji" market, which Berisha linked to corruption and real estate interests. Al Jazeera reported that the protest turned violent and that arrests were made as the opposition accused Rama and his allies of corruption.

==== February 2026 ====
10 February 2026: A large anti-government protest in Tirana turned violent as demonstrators threw Molotov cocktails, flares and fireworks near the Prime Minister's Office and Parliament. Police used tear gas and water cannon to disperse crowds. At least 13 people were arrested, including seven minors, and several people were injured.

20 February 2026: Protesters marched from the Prime Minister's Office toward Parliament and other government buildings. Demonstrators threw petrol bombs, fireworks and stones, while police responded with tear gas and water cannon. Eighteen people were arrested, including two minors. During the protest, Enver Hoxha's former residence, Villa 31, was attacked and partially set on fire; Rama condemned the attack as "barbaric". Molotov cocktails were also thrown near the Namazgah Mosque, disrupting Iftar.

==== March 2026 ====
22 March 2026: About 1,500 police officers were deployed in Tirana ahead of another opposition protest. Demonstrators used Molotov cocktails, fireworks, flares and other pyrotechnics, and clashes spread from the Prime Minister's Office to other public institutions, including the AKSHI building, Tirana Municipality, nearby ministries, Parliament and the Socialist Party headquarters. A police vehicle was set on fire. During the protest, Berisha was temporarily affected by spray thrown toward him and briefly left the protest before returning. Fifteen people were arrested and later released.

==== April 2026 ====
17 April 2026: Protesters clashed with police near the Prime Minister's Office and Parliament. Police blocked protesters from reaching Parliament, and security forces used tear gas and water cannon while protesters threw Molotov cocktails and fireworks. The protest also marked the return of speeches by Democratic Party leaders during demonstrations. Berisha left shortly after tensions began and was escorted away by his bodyguards. A police officer was hospitalized with burns and head trauma, while Democratic Party MPs and activists, including Luçiano Boçi, Aulon Kalaja and Klevis Balliu, were also reported injured. Eleven protesters were arrested.

==== May 2026 ====
8 May 2026: The Democratic Party held another protest in Tirana, with reported turnout lower than in previous demonstrations. At the beginning of the protest, participants held a moment of silence for two children recently killed by a drunk driver. Protesters later clashed with police near the Ministry of Internal Affairs after police blocked a march toward the ministries. Molotov cocktails were thrown at police, injuring three officers, and police used tear gas and water cannon. The Prime Minister's Office was not attacked during this protest.

=== Protests by Lëvizja Bashkë ===
==== December 2025 ====
11 December 2025: Lëvizja Bashkë staged a protest in front of the Albanian Parliament against the 2026 state budget, arguing that it increased inequality, favored oligarchic interests and promoted luxury tower construction.

18 December 2025: Lëvizja Bashkë and other activists assembled in front of Parliament following the Constitutional Court's tied decision regarding Balluku's suspension. No major incidents were reported.

==== January 2026 ====
9 January 2026: Lëvizja Bashkë held a protest in front of the Durrës Municipality building after major flooding in the city. Protesters demanded the declaration of a state of emergency, an investigation into the malfunctioning of the second pumping station, and accountability for the death of a municipal worker swept away by floodwaters.

19 January 2026: Lëvizja Bashkë held another protest in front of Parliament, demanding government accountability, Balluku's resignation and transparency in public tenders. Protesters used the slogan "Hand over Belinda!"

==== April 2026 ====
14 April 2026: A small number of Lëvizja Bashkë activists assembled in front of the Palace of Congresses in Tirana while the Socialist Party was holding a diaspora summit. The activists protested against corruption and the Balluku case, and confrontations occurred with police.

== Reactions ==
=== Domestic ===
Rama Government – Prime Minister Edi Rama condemned the use of Molotov cocktails, fireworks and flares during Democratic Party protests, arguing that the demonstrations were not peaceful civic protests but politically organized acts of violence against public institutions. In March 2026, he dismissed violent protesters as "mercenaries" recruited by local political actors.

Movement for National Development – Dashamir Shehi, leader of the Movement for National Development, criticized the Democratic Party-led protests and argued that frequent demonstrations were serving primarily to prolong Berisha's political role. He also said that protests could not be held every week without a broader strategy.

Environmentalist Agrarian Party – Agron Duka, leader of the Environmentalist Agrarian Party, said that frequent protests did not produce results and argued that demonstrations should reflect genuine public anger rather than only party agendas. Despite this criticism, Duka's party continued to cooperate with the Democratic Party and opposition allies.

Djathtas 1912 – Enkelejd Alibeaj, leader of Djathtas 1912 and a former Democratic Party MP, criticized the protests led by Berisha. He said that "protests with Berisha do not bring any change" and described them as a repetition of previous opposition tactics.

=== International ===
European Union – The European Union Delegation in Albania condemned violence during the protests and stated that, although peaceful assembly is a fundamental right, violence "cannot be justified" and political actors should distance themselves from it.

== Aftermath ==
=== PD leadership election ===
The protests were followed by elections for the leadership of the Democratic Party, which were held on 23 May. Berisha was the only candidate after the disqualification of former MP Ervin Salianji, MP Alesia Balliu, Mereme Sela, Vladimir Mulaj and Evi Kokalari. He was officially reelected as chairman, with 37341 votes for him.

=== Flamingo Revolution ===
Following the demonstration of 8 May, political mobilization shifted away from the earlier party-led campaign. Later that month, protests against a proposed tourism development near Zvërnec and the Vjosa–Nartë Protected Landscape expanded into the Flamingo Revolution, a substantially larger grassroots movement that combined environmental demands with broader opposition to the Rama government.

The movement superseded the earlier opposition protests as the principal anti-government mobilization in Albania. Although its organizers emphasized its civic and non-partisan character and resisted attempts by established parties to assume control, it received support from all major parliamentary opposition parties, including the Democratic Party and its ASHM allies, the Opportunity Party, Lëvizja Bashkë and Lëvizja Shqipëria Bëhet.

== See also ==
- 2017 Albanian opposition protests
- 2018–2019 student protests in Albania
- 2019 Albanian opposition protests
- 2019–2021 Albanian political crisis
- 2020 Albanian protests
- 2022 Albanian protests
- Flamingo Revolution
