= Next Albanian parliamentary election =

Upcoming elections by 2029

- On or before 13 May 2029

All 140 seats in the Kuvendi 71 seats needed for a majority

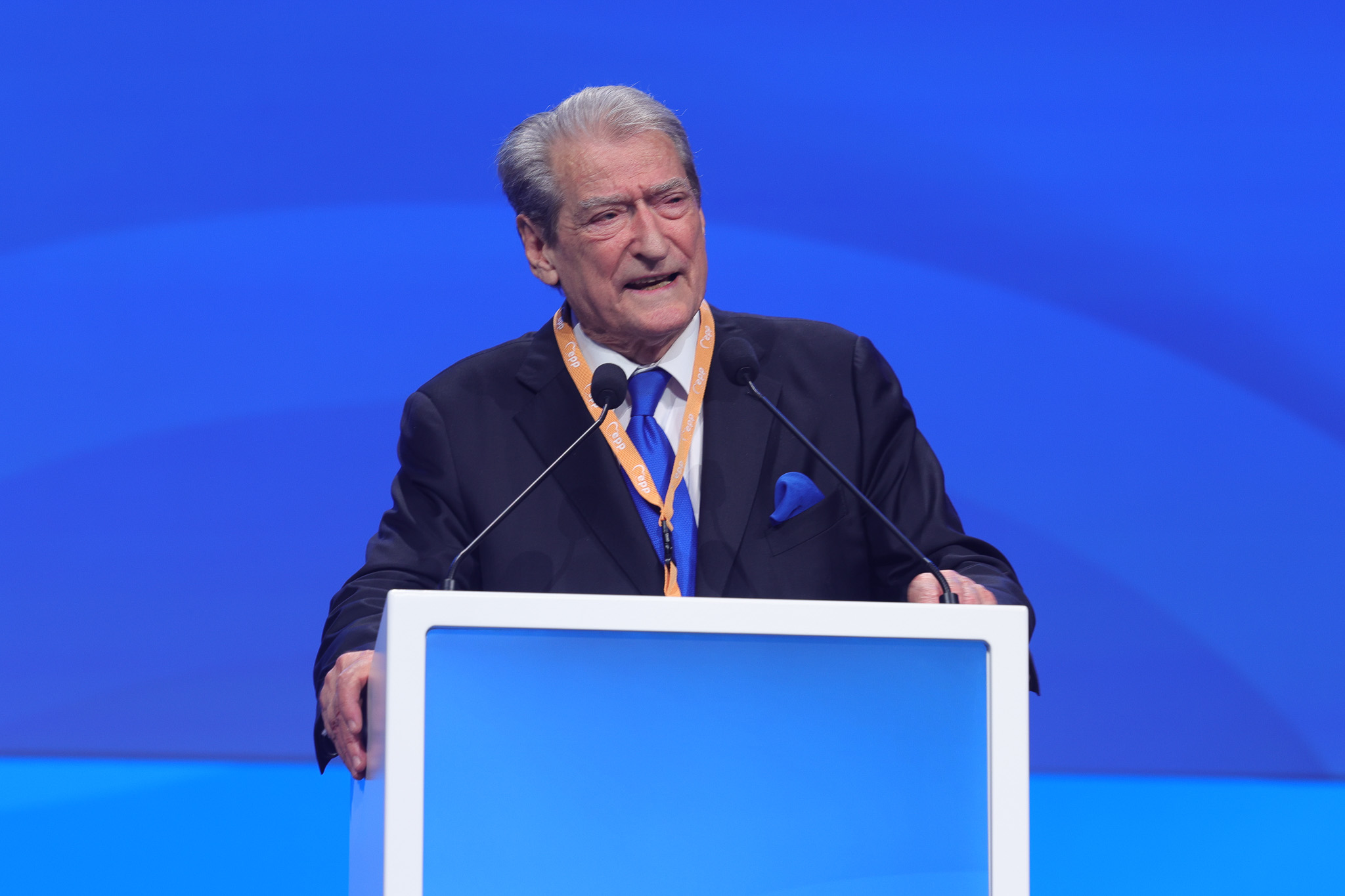

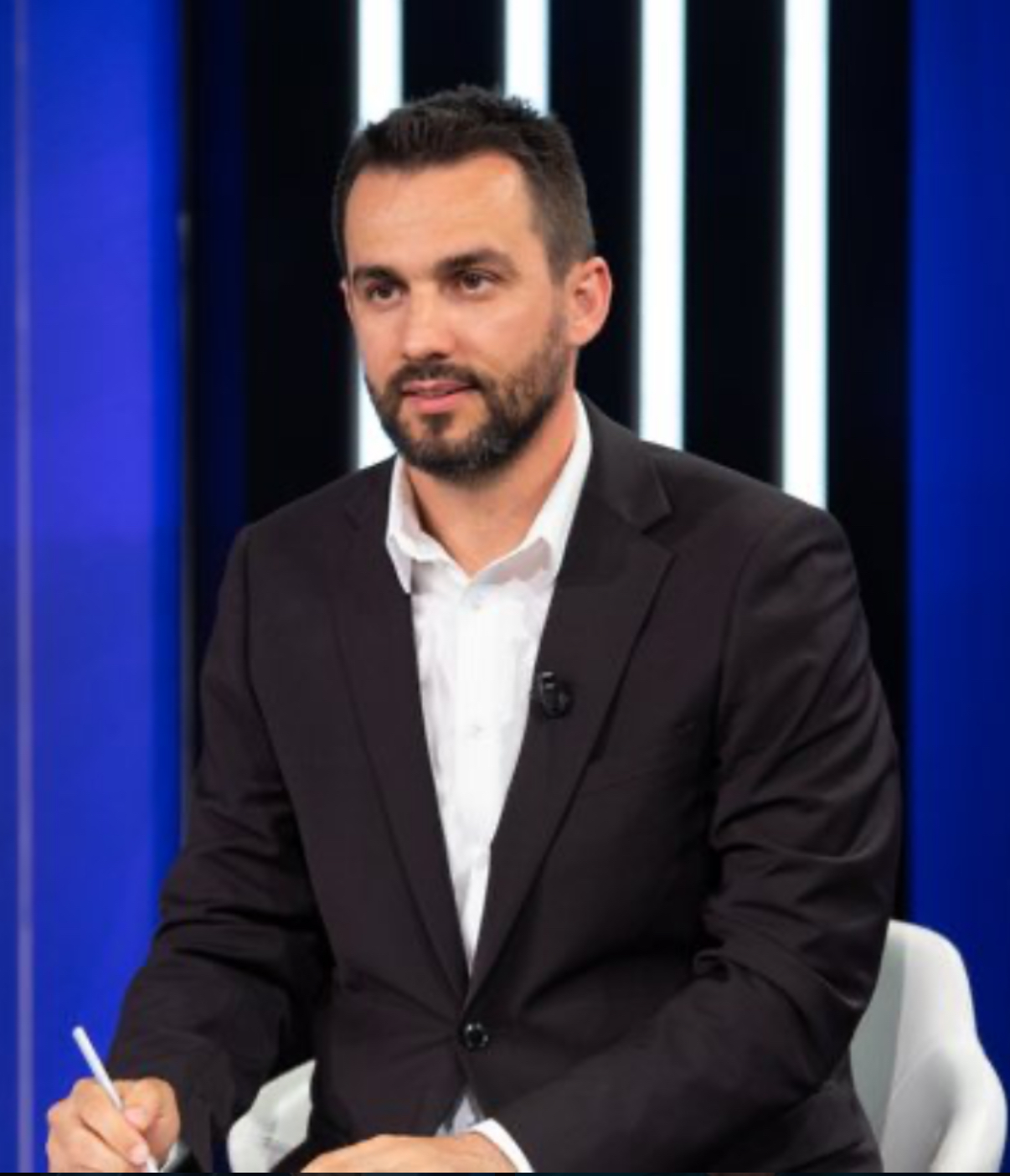

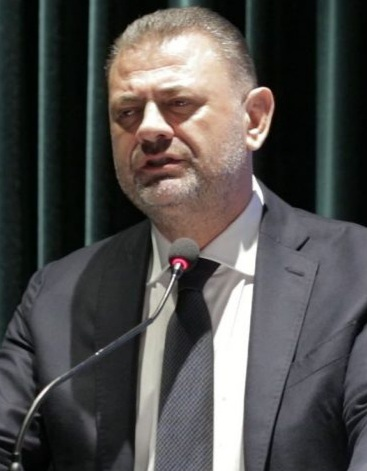

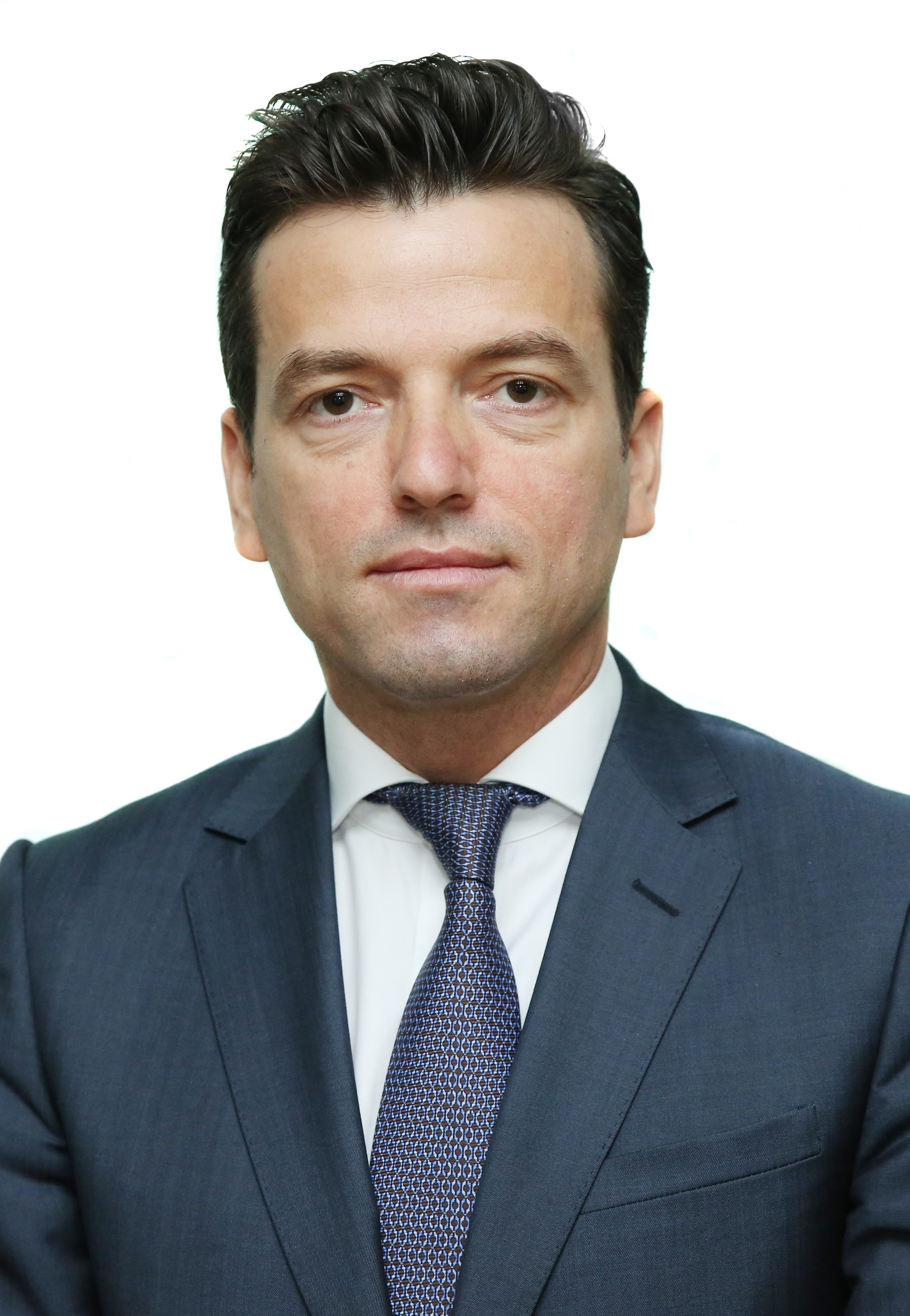

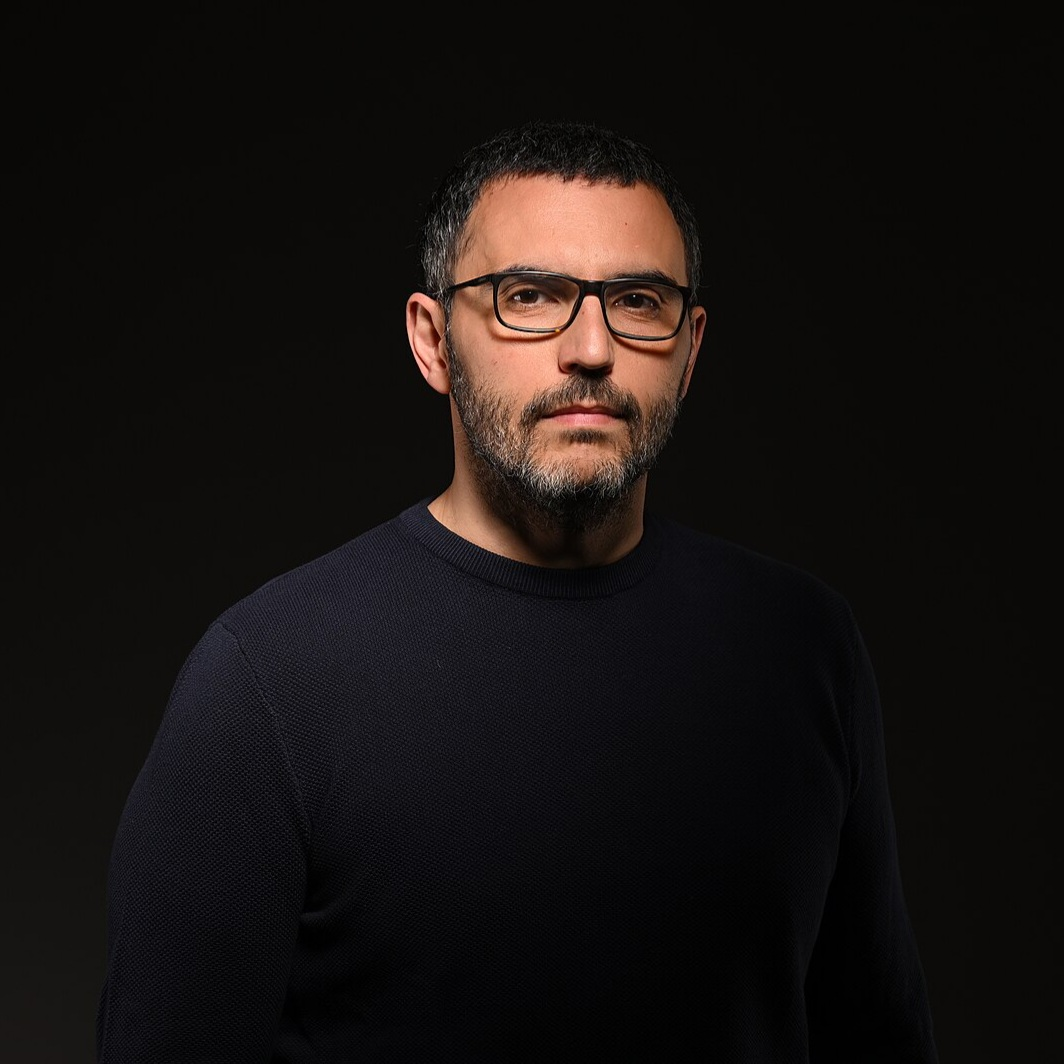
Candidate	Edi Rama	Sali Berisha	Adriatik Lapaj
Party	PS	PD	SHB
Last election	53.3%, 83 seats	32.9%, 50 seats	4.0%, 1 seat
Current seats	82	49	1
Seats needed	Steady	▲22	▲70
Candidate	Tom Doshi	Agron Shehaj	Arlind Qori
Party	PSD	MUNDËSIA	BASHKË
Last election	3.1%, 3 seats	3.1%, 2 seats	1.5%, 1 seat
Current seats	3	2	1
Seats needed	▲68	▲69	▲70
Incumbent Prime Minister
Edi Rama
PS

Parliamentary elections are scheduled to be held in Albania no later than 13 May 2029.

== Electoral system ==
The electoral system of Albania is constructed upon the principles defined in the constitution and the electoral code. As a parliamentary republic, Albania implements a regional proportional representation method that allocates seats in the parliament according to the proportion of votes garnered by political parties in a multi-party system. The parliament is composed of 140 representatives with a term of four years. The constitution codifies substantial democratic principles, stipulating that voting rights are equal, free, and conducted through secret ballot.

All citizens of Albania, upon reaching the age of 18 and have not been deprived of voting rights, are permitted to participate in elections. The electoral code also establishes comprehensive procedures for voter registration, ensuring that all eligible citizens can participate fully in the process. The allocation of representatives in the parliament is integrated on population size within 12 electoral districts, which correspond to the administrative regions of Albania. To ensure proportional representation, the D'Hondt method is employed for seat distribution to parties, contingent upon an electoral threshold of 1%. In the 2025 election, 46 seats were filled by politicians on closed lists and one-third of the politicians elected to the parliament needed to be women.

=== Call for constitutional reform ===
Starting in January 2026, Prime Minister Edi Rama invited the opposition to cooperate on constitutional changes in Parliament, aiming to reduce the size of the Albanian Parliament from 140 to around 100 members. He emphasized that any constitutional reform should go beyond electoral reform and be led by an expert initiative group with sufficient time, resources, and commitment. Rama stated that the ambition is to complete and adopt constitutional reform by the end of the parliamentary mandate.

Democratic Party leader Sali Berisha stated that a Senate could be useful and argued that if Albania were to establish a Senate, the number of deputies should be reduced. He also supported increasing the number of municipalities and set conditions for reform, including the inclusion of ODIHR in the Electoral Reform Commission and the participation of Council of Europe experts in territorial reform.

== Opinion polls ==
=== Tirana ===
Polling firm	Polling dates	Sample	Margin of error	Socialist Party	Democratic Party-ASHM	Opportunity Party	Shqipëria Bëhet	Social Democratic Party	Lëvizja Bashkë	Others	Lead
Notosondaggi + Syri TV	18 – 27 October 2026	2,000	± 3.3%	42%	37.5%	6%	5%	1.5%	4%	4%	4.5%
2025 election	11 May 2025	475,432	—	48.33%	34.43%	4.97%	3.47%	3.10%	2.80%	2.90%	13.90%

== Sources ==
- "Constitution of the Republic of Albania". Organization for Security and Co-operation in Europe (OSCE). 22 November 1998. Archived from the original on 7 October 2023.
- "Albania, Parliamentary Elections, 25 April 2021: Final Report". Organization for Security and Co-operation in Europe (OSCE). 26 July 2021. Archived from the original on 27 May 2024.
