= Florjan Binaj =

Albanian comedian, television presenter (born 1985)

- Born: 12 October 1985 (age 40); Tirana, PSR Albania
- Occupations: Comedian, actor, television presenter, activist
- Years active: 2005–present
- Children: 3

Florjan Binaj (born 12 October 1985) is an Albanian comedian, actor, television presenter and activist. He announced his independent candidacy for the position of Mayor of Tirana in the cancelled 2025 Tirana Mayoral Election originally scheduled for 9 November 2025. On 3 November 2025, following the Constitutional Court’s decision to cancel the elections, he reaffirmed his intention to continue his candidacy whenever the elections are held. His candidacy is supported by several Albanian opposition parties, including the Democratic Party of Albania-ASHM (which includes the Freedom Party), Opportunity Party, Albania Becomes Movement and Hashtag Initiative.

== Career ==
Binaj has appeared in the film Alive. He is primarily known for his work as a comedian on the evening television program Portokalli broadcast on Top Channel, and as the co-host alongside Dojna Mema of the investigative show Piranjat on Syri TV.
