= Arben Ristani =

Albanian politician

Chairman of Central Election Commission
- In office September 2009 – October 2012
- Nominated by: Democratic Party
- Appointed by: Assembly of the Republic of Albania
- Preceded by: Ilirjan Celibashi
- Succeeded by: Lefteri Lleshi

Member of Central Election Commission
- In office 2006–2008
- Nominated by: Republican Party
- Appointed by: Assembly of the Republic of Albania

Personal details
- Born: 29 March 1969 Tirana, Albania
- Education: University of Tirana

Arben Ristani (born 29 March 1969, in Tirana) is the former head of the Central Election Commission and currently a member of Democratic Party of Albania.

Ristani was first nominated by the Republican Party of Albania, while as head of KQZ he was promoted by Democratic Party of Albania. Ristani speaks English and French.

== Professional Experience ==
Ristani worked on following places:

- 1992–1994 District Court Judge in Tirana
- 1993–1995 External Examiner, Faculty of Law Tirana
- 1994–1997 Lawyer
- 1997–1998 inspector in the Ministry of Justice
- 1998–2002 Lawyer
- 2002–2003 Legal Adviser of the President
- 2003–2006 lawyer, vice president at the court, Tirana
- 2006–2008 Member of the Central Election Commission
- 2008–2009 Director of the ASM, Tirana
- 2009–2012 Chairman of the Central Election Commission
- 2012–2013 Deputy Minister of Interior
