= Pandeli Varfi =

Albanian judge (born 1949)

Klement Zguri

Member of Albanian Election Commission
- In office 2 February 2009 – 2013
- Nominated by: Socialist Party
- Appointed by: Assembly of the Republic of Albania

Personal details
- Born: 21.09.1949 Vlora, Albania

Pandeli Varfi (born 21 September 1949) is member of the Central Election Commission of Albania for the Socialist Party of Albania.
