= Piranjat =

Albanian satirical investigative television program (since 2022)

- Genre: Investigative talk show Satire; Political commentary
- Presented by: Florjan Binaj, Arilena Ara (April 2022); Florjan Binaj, Dojna Mema (2023–present)
- Country of origin: Albania
- Original language: Albanian

Production
- Running time: 120 minutes

Original release
- Network: ABC News Albania (2022–2023); Syri TV (2023–present)
- Release: 2022 – present

Piranjat (English: Piranhas) is an Albanian satirical investigative television program that addresses social and political issues through hidden cameras, interviews, and reporting. The program covers a range of current events.

== Format ==
The program combines investigative journalism with a satirical approach. Its main features include:

- Investigative reports using hidden cameras and undercover methods to examine corruption, misconduct, and other societal issues.
- Satirical presentation of findings, often using humorous segments.
- Audience participation, including following up on tips and concerns from viewers.
- Interviews with public figures, sometimes presented in a provocative or confrontational style.

== Presenters ==
The program was initially hosted by Florjan Binaj and Arilena Ara in April 2022. Since 2023, it has been co-hosted by Florjan Binaj and Dojna Mema.

== Broadcast history ==
The program premiered on ABC News Albania in April 2022. In 2023, it moved to Syri TV.
