= Tirana Municipal Council =

Legislature of the capital of Albania

Municipal Council of Tirana Këshilli Bashkiak i Tiranës
- 2023-2027

Type
- Type: Unicameral deliberative assembly of the municipality of Tirana

Leadership
- Mayor: Erion Veliaj, Socialist Party since 21 July 2015
- Chair: Megi Fino, Socialist Party since 10 June 2025

Structure
- Seats: 61
- Political groups: Government (34): PS (34); Opposition (27): BF (15); PD (4); PSD (3); PR (1); PDIU (1); NTH (1); LZHK (1); LB (1)

Elections
- Voting system: Party-list proportional representation
- Last election: 14 May 2023
- Next election: 2027

The Municipal Council of Tirana (Albanian: Këshilli Bashkiak i Tiranës) is the 61-member legislative body of the municipality of Tirana, the capital city of Albania. The council is elected every 4 years.

The council adopts its own internal regulations; scrutinises the work of the mayor of Tirana; approves and amends the city's budget, as proposed by the mayor; approves municipal taxes and tariffs as well as borrowing and the paying off of loans; reviews popular initiatives; appoints and dismisses the secretary of the council; specifies the salary received by employees of the municipality and sets limits on the maximum number of municipal employees; regulates the organization and functioning of the public bodies it creates; authorizes the transfer of public property; oversees the internal auditing of the work of the municipality; elects the councilmembers which will represent the municipality in the county council; grants and rescinds the mandates of the members of the council; chooses the symbols of the municipality; names streets, plazas, territories, and other objects in the jurisdiction of the municipality; and bestows honours in the name of the city.

The meetings of the council are open to the public, unless the mayor or one-fifth of members request otherwise. The number of members is dictated by the law on local self-governance. (Note: Municipalities with up to 20,000 residents: 15 members; Municipalities with up to 50,000 residents: 21 members; Municipalities with up to 100,000 residents: 31 members; Municipalities with up to 200,000 residents: 41 members; Municipalities with up to 400,000 residents: 51 members; Municipalities with more than 400,000 residents: 61 members)

The council was last elected in the 2023 elections, where the Socialist Party retained its majority, albeit with a slimmer margin. Notably, the 2023 elections saw Berisha's faction of the Democratic Party (PD) split off and form the Together We Win coalition with PL, PBDNJ and PDK, which won more votes than the official PD.

== Committees ==
Tirana's City Council consists of 61 members. It has 14 committees listed as follows:

- Finance Committee (7 members)
- Juridical Committee (5 members)
- Commission of Economy and Social Affairs (5 members)
- Education Committee (5 members)
- Committee on Health, Veterinary, Environment Protection (5 members)
- Public Services Committee (5 members) Territorial Adjustment Committee (5 members)
- Foreign Affairs Committee (5 members)
- Mandates Commission (5 members)
- Commission of Public Order and Civil Defense (5 members)
- Housing Committee (5 members)
- Commission of Culture, Youth and Sports (5 members)
- Audit Commission (5 members)
- Assessment Commission figures City (7 members)

== Composition of the council ==
Following the 2023 local elections, the composition of the Council of Tirana is as follows:

| Name | Abbr. | Seats |
|---|---|---|
| Socialist Party of Albania; Partia Socialiste e Shqipërisë | PS | 34 |
| Together We Win; Bashkë Fitojmë | BF | 15 |
| Democratic Party of Albania; Partia Demokratike e Shqipërisë | PD | 4 |
| Social Democratic Party of Albania; Partia Socialdemokrate e Shqipërisë | PSD | 3 |
| Republican Party of Albania; Partia Republikane e Shqipërisë | PR | 1 |
| Party for Justice, Integration and Unity; Partia Drejtësi, Integrim dhe Unitet | PDIU | 1 |
| Hashtag Initiative; Nisma Thurje | NTH | 1 |
| Movement for National Development; Lëvizja për Zhvillim Kombëtar | LZHK | 1 |
| Movement Together; Lëvizja Bashkë | BASHKE | 1 |
