= KZAZ =

KZAZ may refer to:

- KZAZ (FM), a radio station licensed to Bellingham, Washington, United States
- KMSB, a television station licensed to Tucson, Arizona, United States, which held the call sign KZAZ from 1967 to 1985
- Local Election Commissions (Albania) (Albanian: Komisioni Zonal i Administrimit të Zgjedhjeve)
