= Albanian Christian Democratic Movement =

Albanian political party

Albanian Christian Democratic Movement Lëvizja Demokristiane Shqiptare
- Leader: Nikollë Lesi
- Founded: 8 November, 2007
- Split from: Demochristian Party of Albania
- Ideology: Christian Democracy
- Political position: Centre-right
- National affiliation: Alliance for a Magnificent Albania
- Parliament: 0 / 140
- Council Seats: 8 / 1,613

The Albanian Christian Democratic Movement is a Christian-democratic political party in Albania founded by Nikollë Lesi, an MP and former member of the Demochristian Party of Albania (PDK) on 8 November 2007 over disagreements with his previous party's new party leader, Nard Ndoka. Lesi expects to at least match the PDK's performance in the 2005 election at the next election. The party had one MP in the Assembly of Albania until the 2009 Albanian parliamentary election.
