= Endri Shabani =

Albanian academic and politician (born 1985)

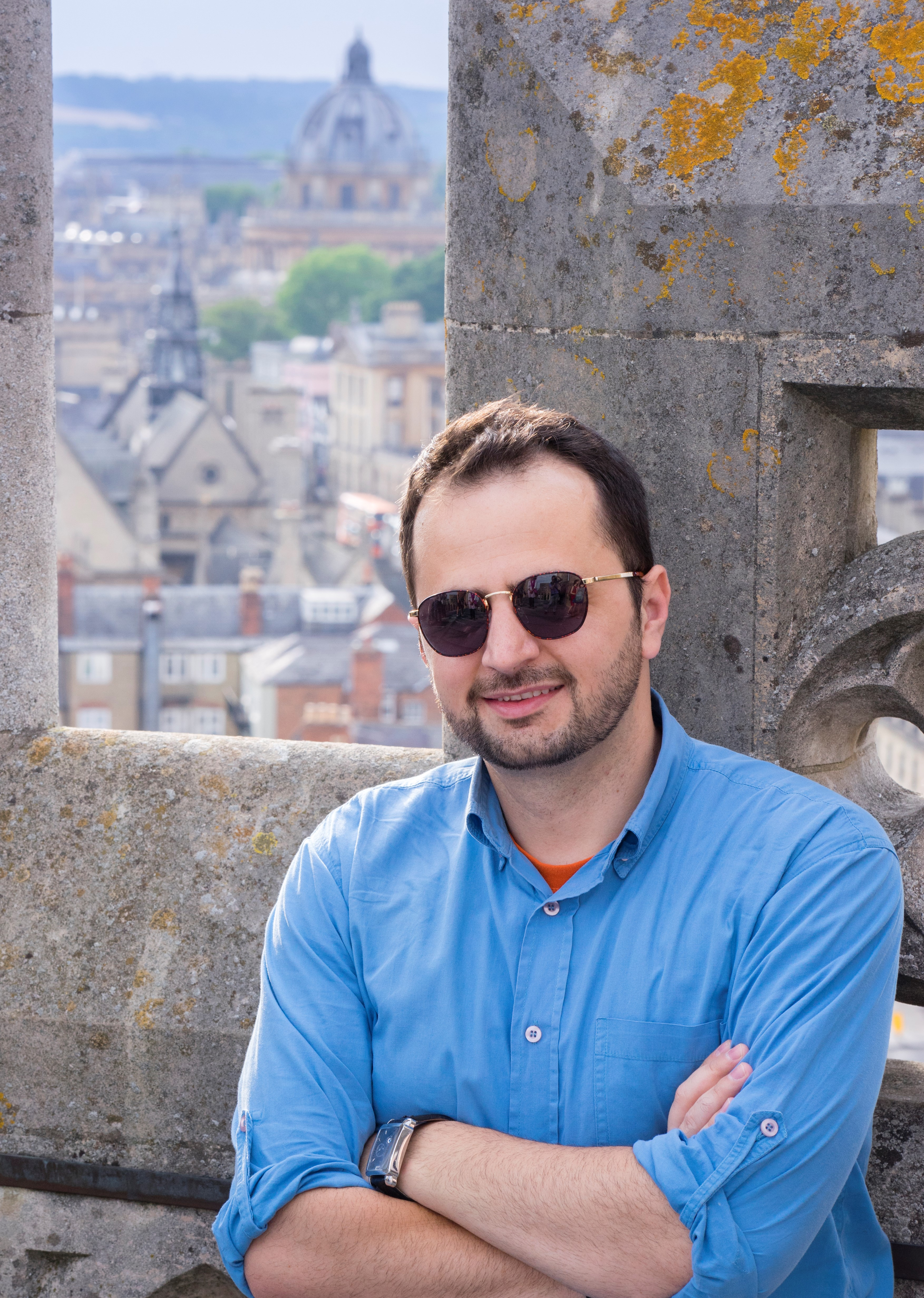
- Shabani at Oxford, 2018

4th Ombudsman of Albania
- Incumbent
- Assumed office 18 December 2025
- Preceded by: Erinda Ballanca

Leader of Nisma Thurje
- In office November 2020 – 6 November 2025
- Deputy: Pano Soko
- Succeeded by: Elton Çanaj

Member of the Tirana Municipal Council
- In office 20 June 2023 – 18 December 2025
- Majority: 6,993 (2.39%)

Personal details
- Born: Endrit Skënder Shabani; 8 February 1985 (age 41) Tirana, Albania
- Other political affiliations: Nisma Thurje
- Education: Pembroke College, Oxford (LLM); St Antony's College, Oxford (DPhil)

Endri Shabani (born 8 February 1985) is an Albanian academic and politician who has served as the Ombudsman of Albania (Albanian: Avokati i Popullit) since December 2025. He was elected by the Parliament of Albania on 11 December 2025, for a five-year term.

Shabani previously served as the leader of Nisma Thurje from 2020 until his resignation in October 2025 and has been a member of the Tirana Municipal Council since 2023.

== Education ==
Shabani completed his secondary education at the Harry Fultz Institute and earned a law degree from Luarasi University in Tirana. In 2013, he pursued a Master of Laws (LLM) at the University of Oxford (Pembroke College), which he completed with top academic results.

In 2014, he was awarded the Clarendon Fund scholarship to undertake doctoral studies in politics and international relations at Oxford. He completed his DPhil in Political Science in 2020 at St Antony's College, Oxford.

== Professional career ==
From 2007 to 2011, Shabani worked as a project manager at Transparency International Albania. He later served for approximately one year as a consultant to the Council of Europe on an anti-corruption project in Albania.

Between 2011 and 2013, he was a lecturer at Luarasi University. In 2017, he served as a consultant for UN Women in Albania.

From 2018 to 2019, Shabani worked as a researcher and briefly as a lecturer at Sciences Po in Paris.

== Political career ==
Shabani began his political activism in 2012 during protests against legislation permitting the import of waste into Albania. He later joined Nisma Thurje and was elected as its leader.

In the 2021 Albanian parliamentary election, Shabani received 1,017 preferential votes. In 2023, he was elected to the Tirana Municipal Council.
