= Local Election Commissions (Albania) =

Local Election Commission of Albania (Albanian: Komisioni Zonal i Administrimit të Zgjedhjeve, abbreviated as KZAZ) are the local KQZ in Albania. They are used as local voting districts. Votes are counted by the KZAZ.
