= Klement Zguri =

Albanian judge

Member of Central Election Commission
- In office 2 February 2009 – current
- Nominated by: Democratic Party
- Appointed by: Assembly of the Republic of Albania

Personal details
- Born: 21 October 1957 (age 68) Shijak, Albania

Klement Zguri (born 21 October 1957) is a member of the Central Election Commission for the Democratic Party of Albania.
