= Benet Beci =

Albanian politician (born 1965)

Mayor of Shkodër
- Incumbent
- Assumed office June 19, 2023
- Preceded by: Bardh Spahia

Personal details
- Born: January 25, 1965 (age 61) Tirana, PSR Albania
- Party: Socialist Party of Albania
- Education: University of Tirana (BA, MBA); Agricultural University of Tirana (PhD); University of Nebraska–Lincoln (MBA); Harvard Kennedy School; London Management Centre
- Profession: Politician, Finance Professional

Benet Beci (born January 25, 1965) is an Albanian politician and finance professional currently serving as the Mayor of Shkodër, a position he assumed in 2023. His extensive career spans over three decades, encompassing roles in local governance, national politics, and development. His 2023 electoral victory was historic, making him the first Socialist Party mayor of Shkodër since the fall of communism in a city long considered a stronghold of the Democratic Party.

== Personal life and education ==
Beci has deep familial ties to Shkodër. His father, Bahri Beci (1936–2023), was born in Shkodër and became a well-respected academic and linguist with a strong connection to the city. In August 2023, Bahri Beci died at the age of 87.

Beci completed his undergraduate studies at the Faculty of Economics in 1987. He later earned a Master's in Business Administration from the University of Tirana in collaboration with the University of Nebraska–Lincoln, focusing on the banking system in Albania. He also holds a Doctorate in Economics from the Agricultural University of Tirana. His professional development includes executive education from institutions such as Harvard Kennedy School and the London Management Centre, where he focused on governance, public-private partnerships, and management practices.

Beci is fluent in Albanian and proficient in English, with intermediate skills in Italian.

== Professional career ==
From 2005 to 2019, Beci served as the Executive Director of the Albanian Development Fund (ADF), an institution established in 1993 with support from international donors to manage infrastructure and development projects across Albania. Under his leadership, the ADF significantly increased its investment capacity, becoming a central entity in the country's development sector.

In January 2019, Beci was appointed as the Administrator of the Albanian Power Corporation (KESH), the nation's largest electricity producer. During his tenure, he focused on diversifying the company's energy sources and enhancing its operations within the regional energy market.

Transitioning to politics, Beci was elected as a Member of the Parliament of Albania in 2021, representing the Shkodër district. He actively participated in committees related to economic policy, trade, and environmental issues until 2023.

== Mayor of Shkodër (2023–Present) ==
=== 2023 Election ===
In the May 2023 local elections, Beci achieved a historic victory by becoming the first Socialist Party mayor of Shkodër since the fall of communism. The city had been a traditional stronghold of the Democratic Party and right-leaning coalitions for decades. Beci won decisively with 60.24% of the vote against his opponent Bardh Spahia of the "Together We Win" coalition, who received 39.8%.

He was sworn in as mayor on June 19, 2023. In his inaugural speech, Beci emphasized his commitment to serving all citizens of Shkodër, stating that the municipality would be "where duties and not privileges are divided."

=== Tenure and initiatives ===
Beci's tenure has been marked by initiatives aimed at urban development, public welfare, and strengthening municipal governance. He has emphasized the importance of infrastructure development and the efficient delivery of public services to enhance the quality of life for Shkodër's residents.

In November 2023, Beci signed a Memorandum of Understanding with UNICEF Representative Roberto de Bernardi to extend the BiblioTech Corner at the "ATELIE" Youth Center in Shkodër. The initiative provides children and youth with access to digital resources, education, and a secure online environment.

In July 2023, Beci met with Kosovo's Prime Minister Albin Kurti to discuss cooperation between the cities of Shkodër and Gjakova, including discussions about a road infrastructure project that would connect the two cities and promote tourism development in the region.

== Controversies ==
In November 2024, reports emerged that Beci was under investigation by the Special Prosecution against Corruption and Organized Crime (SPAK) for alleged corruption and abuse of office during his tenure as the head of KESH. Beci addressed these reports, stating that he had provided the necessary clarifications and dismissed rumors of his resignation.
