= Lëvizja Bashkë =

Albanian political party

Together Movement Lëvizja BASHKË
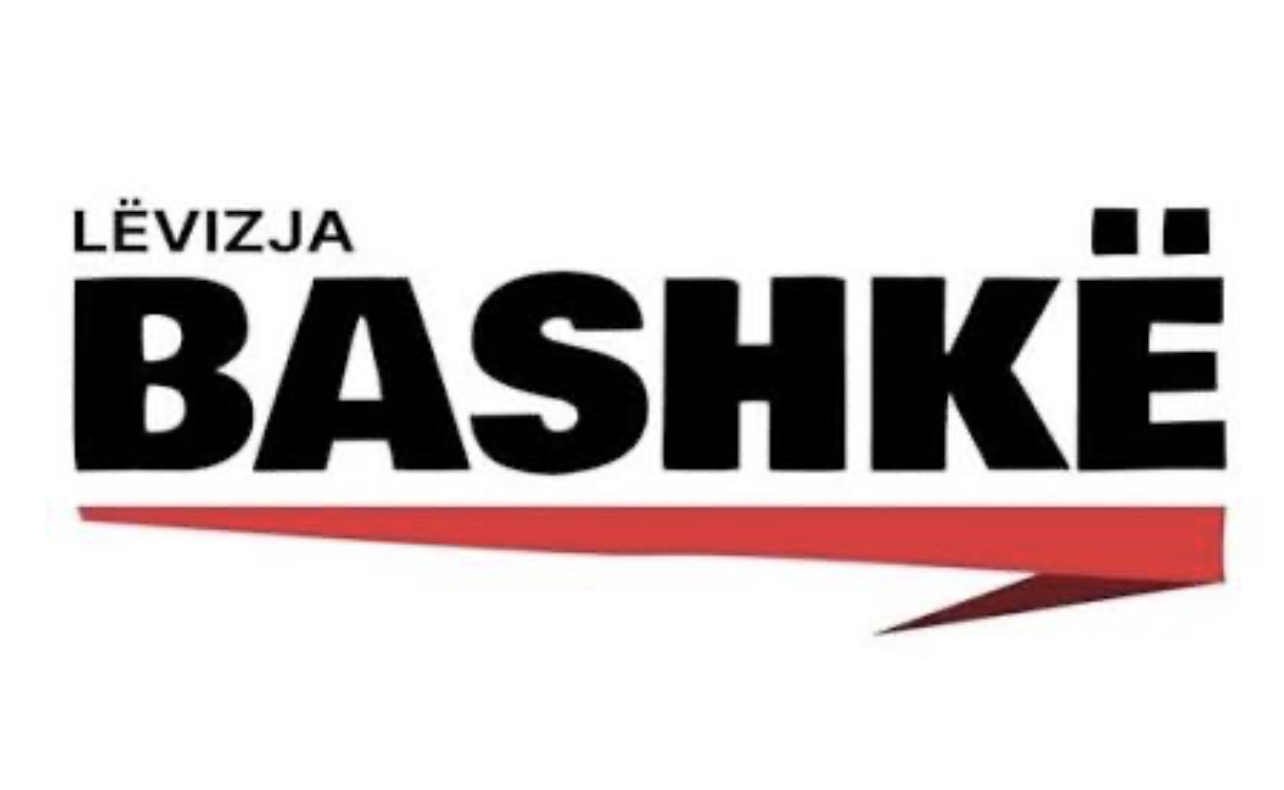
- Abbreviation: BASHKË
- Leader: Arlind Qori
- Founded: 18 December 2022
- Preceded by: Organizata Politike
- Headquarters: Rruga Islam Petrela 92, Tirana
- Newspaper: Teza 11
- Ideology: Social democracy; Progressivism
- Political position: Left-wing
- International affiliation: Progressive International
- Colours: Black; Dark red
- Slogan: E reja po lind! ('The new is being born!')
- Parliament: 1 / 140
- Municipalities: 0 / 61
- Council seats: 1 / 1,613

Website
- levizjabashke.al

Lëvizja Bashkë (lit. 'the Together Movement', styled as Lëvizja BASHKË) is a left-wing political party in Albania. It was founded on 18 December 2022 by members and activists of Organizata Politike (lit. 'the Political Organization', OP), an activist organisation active since 2011. The party describes itself as part of the democratic left and says that it supports a social state, public services, progressive taxation, workers' rights, environmental protection and participatory democracy.

Before becoming a party, the network around Organizata Politike was involved in student, labour and social campaigns, including the Lëvizja Për Universitetin (Movement for University) and support for independent trade-union organising among call-centre workers, miners and oil-refinery workers. Lëvizja Bashkë first participated in elections in Tirana during the 2023 Albanian local elections, where party leader Arlind Qori finished third in the mayoral race and Mirela Ruko was elected to the Tirana Municipal Council. The party entered the Parliament of Albania for the first time after the 2025 Albanian parliamentary election, winning one seat, held by Redi Muçi.

== History ==
=== Organizata Politike ===
Organizata Politike was founded on 21 January 2011. The group presented itself as a political organisation outside Albania's established party system and argued that existing political parties had emptied politics of substantive ideological debate.

The organisation was active in student protests over higher education. It was associated with the campaign Universiteti në Rrezik (University in Danger) against higher-education reforms proposed under the Democratic Party government, and later with Lëvizja Për Universitetin (Movement for University), which opposed higher-education reforms under the Socialist Party government. According to Reporter.al, the organisation developed through university-based activism and later expanded into protests and solidarity work involving students, miners, oil workers and pensioners.

The group also used the European robin (gushëkuqi) as a symbol of resistance and of remaining in Albania despite emigration and social hardship.

=== Labour and social activism ===
Labour organising became one of the public features of the network from which Lëvizja Bashkë later emerged. Progressive International states that members of the movement helped workers create independent unions in sectors including chromium mining, oil refining, call centres and garment work. In February 2019, Albanian call-centre workers launched the National Union of Contact Centers – "Solidarity", representing a sector estimated by UNI Global Union at around 30,000 workers and serving primarily Italian-language markets. UNI Global Union reported that the campaign was supported by the Institute for Critique and Social Emancipation and UNI Global Union, while Redi Muçi later wrote that activists connected with OP had helped set up the call-centre union.

The movement was also linked with support for the United Miners of Bulqiza Trade Union (Sindikata e Minatorëve të Bashkuar të Bulqizës, SMBB). Writing in LeftEast in 2020, Redi Muçi and Griselda Qosja said that miners from AlbChrome contacted OP and received legal and logistical help in forming a new union, which they said had reached 320 members after its recognition. Their article also described the dismissal of union leader Elton Debreshi and other council members after the union's public inauguration and framed the dispute as part of a broader struggle over workers' rights in Albania's mining sector.

Lëvizja Bashkë's official profile states that the earlier OP network also participated in campaigns around the minimum living income, public transport, opposition to the overbuilding of Tirana, protection of the Vjosa River and environmental causes. These activities formed part of the party's later presentation of itself as a movement rooted in civic, student and labour struggles rather than in the older post-communist party system.

=== Founding as a political party ===
On 18 December 2022, activists of Organizata Politike founded Lëvizja Bashkë as a political party. Progressive International describes the party as having been created after twelve years of activism by OP in social struggles and in solidarity with workers, students and citizens.

In its official self-description, Lëvizja Bashkë says that OP had three main areas of activity before the party was founded: labour organising, student activism and social causes, including the minimum living income, public transport, opposition to overbuilding in Tirana, protection of the Vjosa River, environmental protection and gender equality. The party's statute defines it as an organisation built from the bottom up, with internal elections, freedom of expression among members and the right of members to elect and be elected.

=== 2023 local elections ===
Lëvizja Bashkë first contested elections in the 2023 Albanian local elections in Tirana. Arlind Qori ran for mayor of Tirana and received 13,851 votes, or 4.77%, finishing third behind incumbent mayor Erion Veliaj of the Socialist Party and Belind Këlliçi of the opposition Together We Win coalition. In the Tirana municipal-council election, the party won one seat; Mirela Ruko was elected as its councillor for the 2023–2027 mandate.

=== 2025 parliamentary election ===
In 2025, Lëvizja Bashkë contested a national parliamentary election for the first time. Reporter.al described it as a new party led by university lecturer Arlind Qori and as one of the new electoral actors seeking to challenge Albania's long-standing two-party dominance. The party submitted its candidate lists to the Central Election Commission in March 2025; in Tirana, Redi Muçi was placed first on the closed list, followed by Arlind Qori.

In the election held on 11 May 2025, Lëvizja Bashkë won one of the 140 seats in parliament. According to the Institute of Studies for Politics and Democracy, the party received 24,616 votes, or 1.53% of the national vote. Muçi was elected to parliament and the new legislature first convened on 12 September 2025.

== Ideology and platform ==
Lëvizja Bashkë is generally described as a left-wing or progressive party. The party describes itself as belonging to the democratic left and advocates a social state, public services, progressive taxation, labour rights, environmental protection and more participatory democracy. In 2024, Qori described the party's programme as social-democratic and cited the Nordic countries as an ideal reference point.

Reporter.al described the party's 2025 programme as a left-wing response to what it called the neoliberal policies of Albania's two major parties, while also noting that the party's ideological profile had generated debate among political analysts. Political scientist Ermal Hasimja characterised the pre-party activity of OP as Marxist, while analyst Andi Bushati argued that the party represented a new left-wing development in post-communist Albanian politics and an alternative to the neoliberal consensus of the larger parties.

=== Economic policy ===
In its 2025 programme, Lëvizja Bashkë proposed a developmental state model based on stronger public institutions, action against monopolies and oligopolies, and support for sectors such as agriculture, tourism, automotive production and information technology. The party's programme criticises Albania's reliance on low-wage, low-value production and calls for industrial policy aimed at increasing productivity and moving the economy toward higher-value sectors.

The party also proposes greater state involvement in strategic sectors such as agriculture, oil and mineral extraction and processing, and has advocated policies including a sovereign fund, a development bank, reconstruction of the Ballsh oil refinery, support for higher-end manufacturing and a progressive tax system. In agriculture, the programme proposes higher subsidies, support for mechanisation and input costs, and policies to strengthen domestic production. In industry, the party proposes incentives for companies operating in higher-value production, including automotive components and software, while also calling for stronger action against monopolies in areas such as fuel, electronics imports and agricultural collection markets.

In its fiscal proposals, Lëvizja Bashkë argues for a more progressive tax system, with lower taxation on low-income workers and higher rates on high earners, and frames higher taxation of wealth and monopoly profits as a way to finance public services and social policies.

=== Social policy ===
The party's social programme focuses on pensions, social care, healthcare, education, housing, environment and sport. It argues that social rights are a prerequisite for equal civil and political rights and seeks to combine elements of welfare-state models from northern, western and central Europe. The party has campaigned on increasing pensions and social assistance, reducing out-of-pocket healthcare costs, increasing spending on public education and healthcare, and improving support for marginalised groups, including Roma and Egyptian communities. In education, the party links higher spending to teacher and university-staff pay, student support and the strengthening of public education. In healthcare, it argues for greater public financing, more affordable medicine, higher salaries for medical personnel and modernisation of public hospitals. The programme also includes housing and environmental chapters, reflecting the party's view that social rights should extend beyond direct cash transfers and into public services and living conditions.

=== Rule of law and anti-corruption ===
Lëvizja Bashkë's programme calls for strengthening the rule of law, judicial independence and institutional accountability. It argues that Albania's justice system is vulnerable to influence from high-ranking officials and proposes reforms such as greater court efficiency, repeal of public-private partnership legislation that the party says has produced inflated costs, and the creation of an anti-corruption and integrity agency.

=== Democratic participation and labour rights ===
The party's platform places emphasis on participatory democracy, workplace democracy and labour organising. Its programme proposes wider use of referendums and citizen legislative initiatives, changes to electoral rules, stronger trade-union rights, gender-equality policies, independent media and digital security measures. The party also supports voting rights for Albanian citizens living abroad and a national proportional electoral system. In the labour chapter of its programme, Lëvizja Bashkë argues that democracy should extend to workplaces and proposes reducing legal barriers to forming unions in companies. Its gender-equality proposals include domestic-violence awareness campaigns, support services for victims of abuse and measures to increase women's labour-market participation.

== Organisation ==
Lëvizja Bashkë's statute defines the party's main organs as the Congress, Coordinating Council, Secretariat, local base units, coordinator, Ethics and Statute Commission, chairperson, organising secretary and finance officer. The Congress is the party's highest decision-making body and must meet at least once every two years; at least two-thirds of its delegates are elected by the membership, while ex officio delegates include members of the Coordinating Council and the party chairperson.

The Coordinating Council is the highest decision-making body between congresses. It approves internal regulations, the annual membership quota, candidate lists, relations with social organisations, participation in international forums and other strategic decisions. The chairperson is elected by the party membership for a two-year mandate and may be recalled through a confidence process initiated by 10% of the membership. The statute also provides for local base units, which may be created at municipal or administrative-unit level and among members living abroad.

== Election results ==
=== Parliamentary elections ===
Election	Leader	Votes	%	Seats	+/–	Status
2025	Arlind Qori	24,616	1.53	1 / 140	New	Opposition

=== Local elections ===
Election	Office	Candidate	Votes	%	Seats	Status
2023	Mayor of Tirana	Arlind Qori	13,851	4.77	–	3rd
2023	Tirana Municipal Council	List led by Lëvizja Bashkë	7,500 (Note: Reporter.al reported that the party received about 7,500 votes in the Tirana municipal-council race.)	–	1 / 61	Opposition
