= Redi Muçi =

Albanian politician

Member of the Albanian Parliament
- Incumbent
- Assumed office 12 September 2025
- Constituency: Tirana

Personal details
- Born: 18 November 1985 Gjirokastër, PR Albania
- Party: Lëvizja Bashkë
- Education: University of Manchester, University of Tirana
- Occupation: Politician, professor, engineer

Redi Muçi (born 18 September 1985) is an Albanian politician, professor and engineer who has been a Member of the Albanian Parliament for Tirana since 2025. He was first on the party list for Lëvizja Bashkë and the only candidate to be elected.
