= Reorganised Party of Labour of Albania =

- First Secretary: Marko Dajti
- Founded: 4 July 2007
- Ideology: Communism; Marxism-Leninism; Hoxhaism

The Reorganized Party of Labour of Albania (Albanian: Partia e Punes e Shqiperise e Riorganizuar) is a Marxist-Leninist and Hoxhaist party in Albania. It was founded on July 4, 2007. The first secretary is Marko Dajti. The party won one local seat in the 2011 elections. In the parliamentary election of 2013, it had 622 votes, and integrated the Alliance for a European Albania.

The party published a journal called Bashkimi.

== See also ==
- Bashkimi (Democratic Front newspaper)
