= Zef Bushati =

Albanian diplomat

Zef Bushati (born 11 October 1953) is the ambassador of Albania to the Holy See since 10 May 2002. This followed the signing of an Agreement of Cooperation between Albania and the Holy See on 23 March 2002, which was at that time awaiting the ratification of the Albanian parliament.

A member and former chairman of the Demochristian Party of Albania, he has also served as a parliamentarian in Albania. While serving in that capacity, he was a member of an important Center-right coalition.

Bushati was a forming member of the ethnic Albanian Christodemocrat Union across Kosovo, Croatia, and Albania. At the organization's founding in Lucerne, Switzerland in 1995, Bushati was selected to serve its chairman at least until its first general congress.

Bushati is a part of the Bushati family a feudal Albanian family in the Ottoman era.
