= Ilirjan Celibashi =

Albanian politician

State Election Commissioner of Albania
- Incumbent
- Assumed office 5 October 2020
- Preceded by: Klement Zguri
- In office 10 February 2001 – 30 March 2006
- Preceded by: Fotaq Nano
- Succeeded by: Çlirim Gjata

Minister of State for Relations with the Parliament
- In office 15 September 2013 – 14 August 2014
- President: Bujar Nishani
- Prime Minister: Edi Rama
- Preceded by: Office established
- Succeeded by: Ermonela Felaj

Member of the Parliament of Albania
- In office 9 September 2013 – 17 December 2013
- Constituency: Fier County

Personal details
- Born: 2 October 1969 (age 56) Çorovodë, Skrapar, PR Albania
- Party: Socialist Party
- Education: University of Tirana
- Profession: Lawyer, former judge

Ilirjan Celibashi (Albanian pronunciation: [iliɾˈjan t͡sɛlibaʃi]; born October 2, 1969) is an Albanian lawyer and politician, currently serving as the State Election Commissioner of Albania. He is a former judge, Member of Parliament, and Minister for Relations with the Parliament.

== Early life and education ==
Celibashi was born in Çorovodë, Skrapar district. He graduated in law from the University of Tirana in 1992.

== Judicial and early public service career ==
Celibashi began his legal career as a judge at the Fier District Court and later served as Head of the First Instance Court in Mallakastër. He served as a judge at the Court of Appeals in Durrës from 1998 to 2001.

== Electoral administration ==
From 2001 to 2006, Celibashi served as Chair of the Central Election Commission (Albania), overseeing the parliamentary elections of 2001 and 2005, as well as the 2003 local elections.

== Parliamentary and ministerial roles ==
In the 2013 elections, Celibashi was elected as a Member of Parliament representing Fier for the Socialist Party of Albania. Later that year, he became Minister for Parliamentary Relations, serving until August 2014.

== See also ==
- Central Election Commission (Albania)
