= Tërmet Peçi =

Albanian politician (born 1972)

Member of the Albanian Parliament
- Incumbent
- Assumed office 12 September 2025
- Constituency: Gjirokastër County

Mayor of Tepelenë
- In office 30 June 2011 – 11 March 2025
- Preceded by: Sevo Miçi
- Succeeded by: Gramos Sako

Personal details
- Born: 31 August 1972 (age 54) Tepelenë, PR Albania
- Party: Socialist Party of Albania
- Education: University of Gjirokastër
- Profession: Politician

Tërmet Peçi (Albanian pronunciation: [ˈtərmɛt ˈpɛtʃi]; born 31 August 1972) is an Albanian politician and member of the Socialist Party of Albania. Since September 2025, he has been elected as a Member of the Albanian Parliament representing Gjirokastër County.

He previously served as Mayor of Tepelenë from June 2011 until March 2025. Peçi was first elected mayor following the 2011 local elections and was re-elected for subsequent terms. In March 2025, he resigned from his mayoral position to run as a candidate in the parliamentary elections. After his resignation, Deputy Mayor Julinda Karteri was appointed acting mayor of Tepelenë.
