= Adriatik Lapaj =

Albanian politician (born 1988)

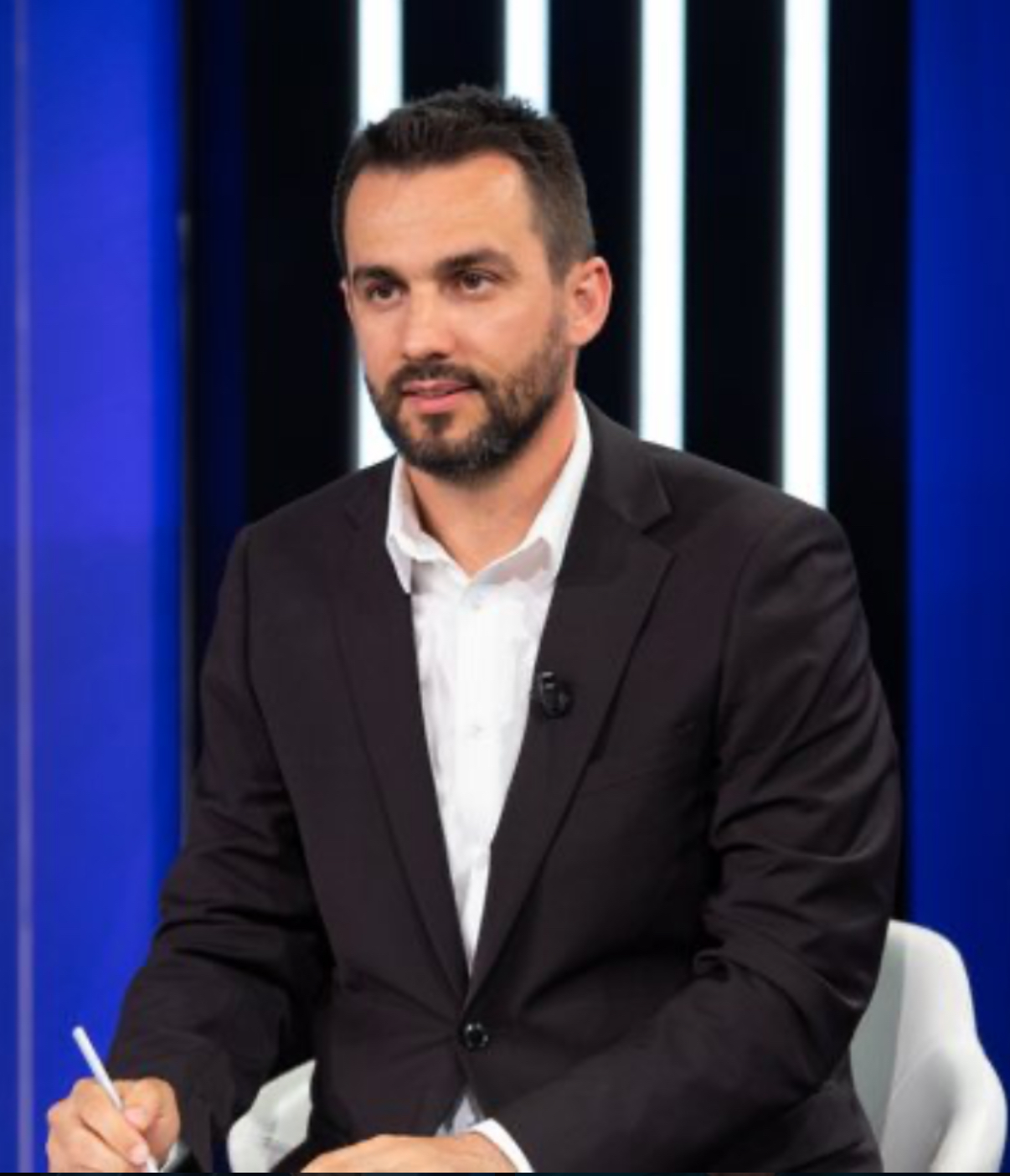
- Lapaj in 2025

Leader of the Lëvizja Shqipëria Bëhet
- Incumbent
- Assumed office 18 September 2023

Personal details
- Born: 9 June 1988 (age 38) Sarandë, PSR Albania
- Party: Lëvizja Shqipëria Bëhet (2023–)
- Other political affiliations: Red and Black Alliance (2010–2017)
- Education: University of Tirana
- Occupation: Lawyer, activist, politician

Adriatik Lapaj (born 9 June 1988) is an Albanian lawyer, activist and politician. He is the founder and leader of the political movement Lëvizja Shqipëria Bëhet, established in 2023.

== Early life and education ==
Lapaj was born in Albania and pursued his law degree at the University of Tirana. He began his activism at the age of 22 and has been actively involved in civil society initiatives for over 14 years.

== Political career ==
In September 2023, Lapaj founded the political movement "Shqipëria Bëhet," aiming to democratize Albania's political landscape. The movement emphasizes electoral reform, the approval of a referendum law to promote direct democracy, and granting voting rights to the Albanian diaspora.

Under Adriatik Lapaj's leadership, "Shqipëria Bëhet" has initiated a series of nationwide consultations. These efforts include organizing forums across all 61 municipalities in Albania and engaging with the diaspora. The primary goal is to involve citizens and experts in legislative advocacy and public debates, thereby amplifying the voice and rights of the populace.

In October 2024, the movement was officially registered as a political party in the Albanian court system, enabling it to participate formally in the country's political processes.

== Public perception ==
Lapaj has made significant headway in public opinion. A poll conducted by Euronews Albania in June 2024 found that 40.8% of participants had a positive perception of him, the highest among leaders of new political movements outside the traditional party duopoly. In October, another poll conducted by Euronews Albania, found that he had a 46.2% approval rating, the highest out of any politician in Albania including Prime Minister Edi Rama with 45.8%.
