= Syri Television =

- Official logo
- Country: Albania

Ownership
- Owner: Andi Bejtja

History
- Founded: 2015 (website)
- Launched: 2020 (channel)

Links
- Website: syri.net

Syri TV also known as Syri.net is a television channel and news agency in Albania launched in 2017 under test broadcasting and began full broadcast in 2020.

Syri.net started reporting as a website in 2015, as a website close to the opposition and critical of Edi Rama's administration. Syri as a channel is considered to be close to the opposition.

Syri Television has also launched a radio station named "Syri FM Radio" currently transmitting in Albania at 89.8 megahertz (MHz) on the FM band.
