= Arlind Qori =

Albanian politician (born 1981)

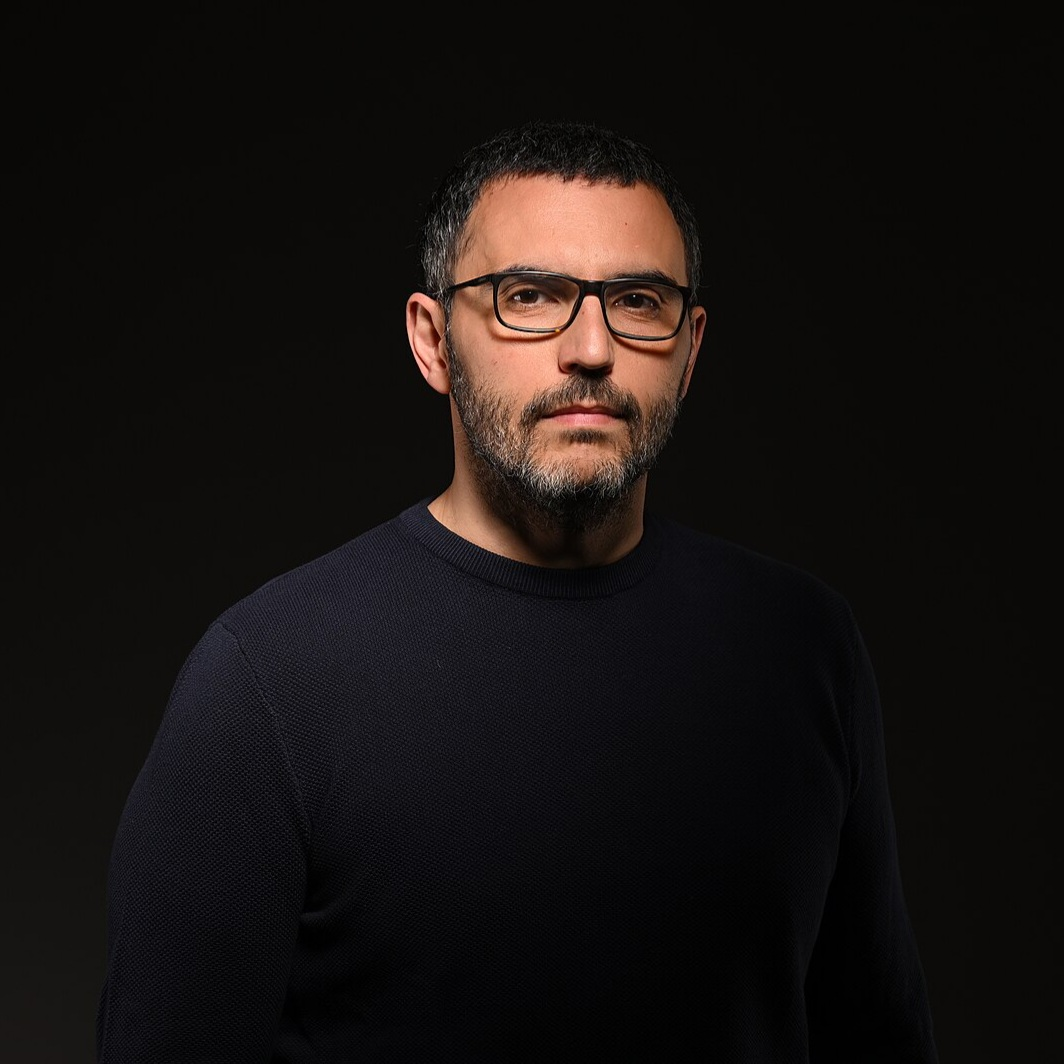
- Arlind Qori in 2023

Leader of the Together Movement
- Incumbent
- Assumed office 18 December 2022

Personal details
- Born: 11 November 1981 (age 44) Tirana, PSR Albania
- Party: Together Movement
- Education: University of Tirana
- Occupation: Professor, activist, politician

Arlind Qori (born 11 November 1981) is an Albanian politician, professor and activist serving as the leader of Lëvizja Bashkë (lit. 'Together Movement') since 18 December 2022. He currently works as a professor in the Faculty of Social Sciences at the University of Tirana, teaching political science. He has been active as an activist for multiple years.

== Personal life ==
Arlind Qori was born in Tirana on 11 November 1981. During his childhood, he lived in the neighborhood alongside Pjetër Budi Street. He completed his primary education at Osman Myderizi School and his high school education at the Ismail Qemali Gymnasium. He is married and has 2 children. He is an avid fan of Partizan Tirana.

== Academic life ==
Qori graduated with a degree in political science in 2004 after 4 years of studies. In 2009, he completed his master's studies in the Department of Sociology and Philosophy, defending the dissertation "Postmodern Philosophy and Human Rights."

He completed his doctoral studies in 2015 with the thesis: "The Idea of Europe and Albania's Ideology: A Study of the Role of the Idea of Europe in the Ideologisation of Albanian Political Discourse after 1991." Since that year, he has held the title of Doctor of Sciences.

Since 2005, Qori has been a lecturer at the Department of Political Science of the University of Tirana. Over the years, he has been the head of the courses "History of Political Thought", "Theory of Development", "Postmodern Political Discourse", "Theory of Democracy", etc.

Among his academic publications, one can mention the textbook History of Political Thought, as well as the co-authorship of two studies "The Condition of the Working Class in Albania" (IKESH, 2017) and "The Proletarianization of the Albanian Peasantry" (IKESH, 2017).

He is a co-organizer of the annual scientific conference "Dialectic and History", which brings together researchers from various fields who share a critical approach to history and socio-political reality.

Qori has contributed to public life since 2011 with a series of articles. Initially, his writings were published in newspapers such as "Shqip", "Shekulli", the magazine Klan etc., while in recent years his journalistic activity, but also as a translator, has focused on the blog Teza11. For the foreign reader, Qori has been the author of a series of articles in magazines such as Jacobin, Bilten, LeftEast, etc.

== Political career ==
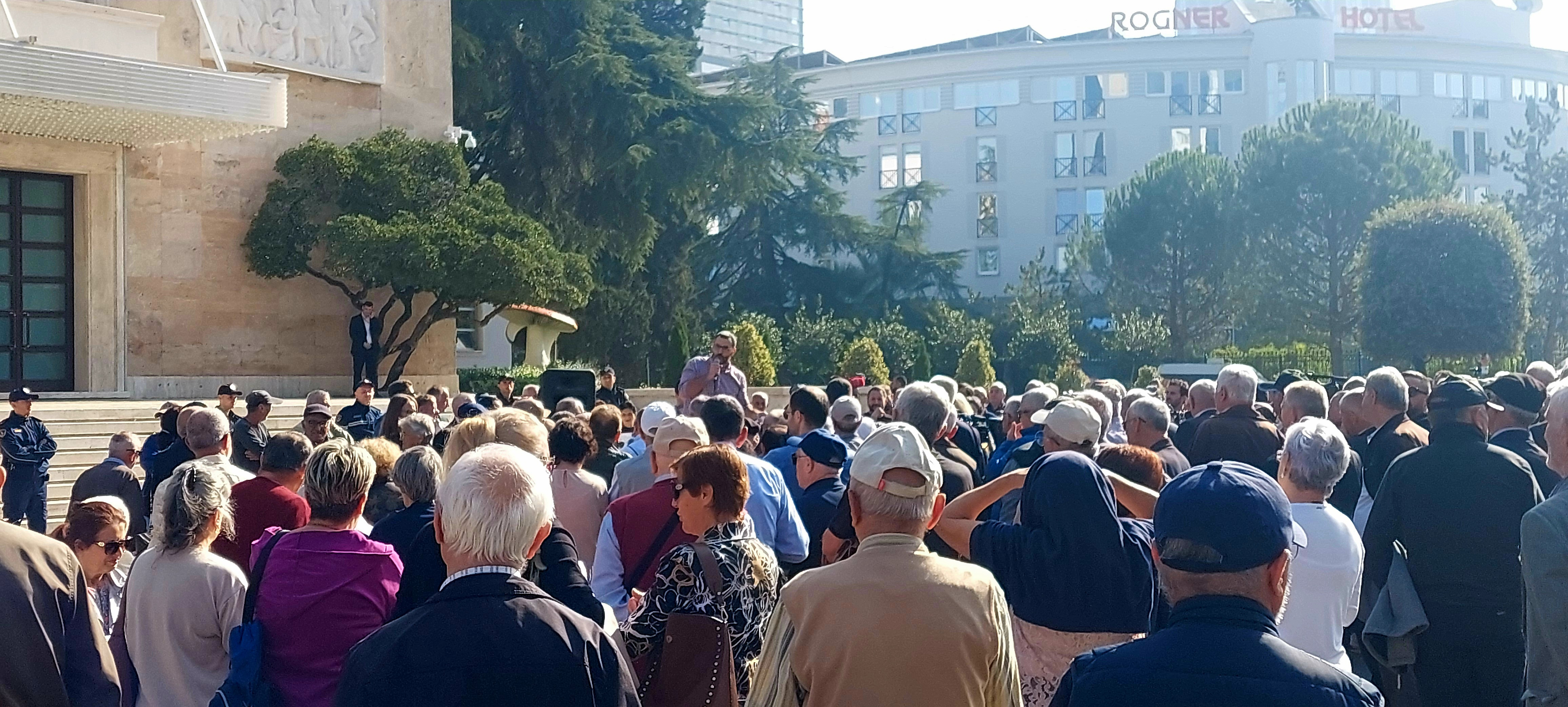
Arlind Qori in the pensionists protest in October 2024

Qori's political activity began with his involvement in the Political Organization (OP) immediately after the bloody protest of January 21, 2011.

During about 12 years as an OP activist, Qori has participated in a series of protests, actions and political activities. Among the most notable examples are the participation in protests in solidarity with the Bulqiza miners in 2011, protests against the import of chemical weapons in 2013, protests for quality and free public transport in 2014 and 2016, protests against the concreting of the Tirana Artificial Lake Park in 2016, civic protests in response to the murder of teenager Ardit Gjoklaj in 2016, protests against the murder of young Klodian Rasha by the police in December 2018, protests in defense of the citizens' park near the area of the Former Bus Park in 2017 and protests against price increases during the spring of 2022.

Because the focus of the Political Organization's activity has been on labor causes, as an activist Qori has been engaged in helping workers in the mining, oil tanker, fashion and contact center sectors to organize into unions. Among the highlights are the support for the Bulqiza miners' strike and protests between December 2019 and January 2020, as well as the hunger strike and protests of oil workers between 2020 and 2021.

In 2012, Qori was also an activist of the university movement, "University in Danger, and after 2014 also an activist of its successor "Movement for the University". He held critical stances towards the commercializing neoliberal reforms in higher education, against the increase in fees and bureaucratic abuses against students. In 2014–2015, he was a participant and engaged in a chain of protests by university students in Tirana against the law on higher education, finally approved by the Albanian Parliament in July 2015. In December 2018, together with LPU activists and thousands of students, professors and citizens of Tirana, Qori was one of the most engaged in the historic protests of that end of the year. Due to his engagement, for several months political opponents accused him as a "communist" and "paid by Soros". Since 18 December 2022, the date of the establishment of the BASHKË Movement at the initiative of activists of the former Political Organization, Qori has been elected chairman of the BASHKË Movement, with a 1-year mandate as determined by the party's Statute.

In February 2023, the Together Movement Coordination Council elected Qori as the BASHKË Movement's candidate for mayor of Tirana in the local elections of 14 May 2023. In these elections, Qori and the Together Movement received a surprising result with 13,851 votes and won a seat on the Tirana Municipal Council, where Mirela Ruko was elected.
