= Together We Win =

Albanian coalition led by Sali Berisha

Together We Win Bashkë Fitojmë
- Abbreviation: BF
- Chairperson: Ilir Meta (de jure); Sali Berisha (de facto)
- Spokesperson: Ilir Meta; Sali Berisha
- Founder: Sali Berisha
- Founded: 15 March 2023; 3 years ago
- Succeeded by: Alliance for a Great Albania
- Headquarters: Tirana, Albania
- Ideology: Liberal conservatism; Conservatism; Atlanticism; Pro-Europeanism
- Political position: Centre-right
- Colours: Blue; Red; Light blue
- Slogan: Ndryshimi në duart e tua (transl. Change is on your hands)
- Municipality: 6 / 61
- Council seats: 291 / 1,613

Website
- pdsh.al/bashkefitojme/

Together We Win (Albanian: Bashkë Fitojmë) is an Albanian political coalition led by Sali Berisha, the leader of the Democratic Party of Albania and Ilir Meta, the leader of the Freedom Party of Albania. It was founded originally as House of Freedom (Albanian: Shtëpia e Lirisë).

== History ==
After the expulsion of Sali Berisha from the Democratic Party of Albania, most members of the party, including several members of parliament, aligned with Berisha in opposing the leadership of Lulzim Basha.

In response, Berisha’s supporters formed a separate electoral alliance that contested the March 2022 partial elections. This alliance included the Socialist Movement for Integration, which had since become the Freedom Party of Albania, and the Demochristian Party of Albania, along with defectors from the Democratic Party unhappy with Basha’s leadership after the party’s third consecutive defeat in national elections. Berisha’s coalition finished in second place overall, but his candidate won the mayoral race in Shkodër.

Following these results, Lulzim Basha resigned as leader of the Democratic Party. Leadership of the party was assumed by Enkelejd Alibeaj, which led to further internal divisions within the party.

On 15 March 2023, the Democratic Party (PD), the Liberal Party of Albania (PLL), the Party for Justice, Integration and Unity (PBDNJ), and other opposition groups registered the coalition “Together We Can Win” for the 2023 local elections.

On 15 April 2023, the Republican Party of Albania, New Democratic Spirit, and several other opposition parties ran candidates for municipal council seats while endorsing Berisha’s candidates for mayor in the 2023 Albanian local elections. Although Sali Berisha was considered the de facto leader of the “Together We Can Win” coalition by many candidates, electoral authorities did not permit him to register as the official head of the coalition.

== Member organizations ==
Party	Acronym	Chairman
Freedom Party of Albania	PL	Ilir Meta
Democratic Party of Albania	PD	Sali Berisha
Demochristian Party of Albania	PDK	Nard Ndoka
Unity for Human Rights Party	PBDNJ	Vangjel Dule
