= Central Election Commission (Albania) =

Independent body overseeing elections in Albania

- Komisioni Qëndror i Zgjedhjeve
- KQZ Logo

Agency overview
- Formed: 10 June 2000
- Headquarters: Tirana, Albania
- Employees: +50
- Agency executives: Commissioner, Ilirjan Celibashi; Deputy Commissioner, Lealba Pelinku
- Website: kqz.gov.al

The Central Election Commission (Albanian: Komisioni Qëndror i Zgjedhjeve), abbreviated in English as CEC and in Albanian as KQZ, is the permanent, independent, non-partisan election commission responsible for conducting parliamentary and local elections in the Republic of Albania. It also regulates and oversees political parties, coalitions, government bodies, and the media to ensure electoral laws are upheld. It is regulated by and beholden to the Electoral Code.

The commission is made up of 4 separate bodies: the Commissioner, the Deputy Commissioner, the Regulatory Commission (KRR), and the Commission for Complaints and Sanctions (KAS).

== Responsibilities and objectives ==
The KQZ's primary objective is to ensure the uniform application of the electoral code. This includes ensuring compliance with campaign finance regulations, administering state funding for political parties, and maintaining the register of political parties. It additionally regulates the conduct of governmental agencies and media organizations during an election.

The KQZ handles the operation of general and local elections as well as referendums. It is the final body which officially certifies and promulgates election results.

The commissioner and KRR jointly oversee the functioning of the local electoral commissions (KZAZ) in line with the electoral code.

It has broad powers to ensure the electoral code is followed. For example, the KQZ can require that party offices located too close to polling stations be closed.

== Organization ==
=== State Election Commissioner ===
The State Election Commissioner, known also as simply the Commissioner, directs the civil service of the commission, represents the commission with third parties, and monitors the actions of electoral subjects, the government, and media organizations.

The commissioner assumes any function of the KQZ not delegated to the other three bodies or the local commissions.

The commissioner is elected to a 7-year term by the Albanian Parliament with a three-fifths supermajority vote. Any Albanian citizen who used to be a senior civil servant, senior party functionary, or ex-director of an NGO involved with the operation of elections may be proposed for State Commissioner.

The role is incompatible with any party affiliation or conflicts of interest.

The responsibilities of the Commissioner include:

- the day-to-day administration of the KQZ
- monitoring the actions of all parties involved in the conduct of an election or referendum
- holding and chairing meetings and sessions of the KAS and Regulatory Commission
- appointing and dismissing members of the local electoral commissions
- negotiating on behalf of the KQZ with third parties
- ensuring the electoral code is being followed
- organizing and conducting elections whenever called for in law
- monitoring the finances of political parties and the funding for election campaigns
- monitoring the actions of public institutions throughout the campaign period of an election
- organizing the training and qualification process for the staff of the KQZ
- informing the public on the actions of the KQZ
- promulgating the mandates given to elected deputies (in general elections) and local councillors (in local elections)
- administering the KQZ's budget, including formulating its annual budget proposal
- reporting to Parliament on the actions of the commission.

=== Deputy Election Commissioner ===
The deputy commissioner is elected for a 4-year term by the Albanian Parliament with the duty of monitoring and observing the implementation of the electronic identification technology used in elections.

=== Regulatory Commission ===
The Regulatory Commission is composed of 5 members, one of whom is appointed chair. They are elected for 5-year terms by the Albanian Parliament in the same process as the Commissioner.

The members of the Regulatory Commission are subject to the same requirements as the State Commissioner. They are required to have legislative experience.

The Commission passes normative acts on:

- the rules for the conduct of the election or referendum, including the duties of the different electoral bodies
- the rules and advice for improving electoral practices
- the rules for reporting on the conduct of public institutions related to elections, as well as the rules on preventing abuse and enforcing decisions of the KQZ
- the methodology used for monitoring the conduct of the media, as well as the procedure for disciplinary actions against news organizations
- the technical specifications of the various systems employed during an election
- the rules on the publishing of finances by electoral subjects
- the rules on the procurement and use of election materials
- the procedural rules for meetings/sessions of the Regulatory Commission and the KAS.

Additionally, the Commission passes normative acts prepared by the civil service of the KQZ, on:

- administrative electoral borders
- the number of deputies granted to each county
- the use of electronic devices to fulfil specific electoral procedures
- the conduct of absentee voting from outside of Albania.

In most cases, for the commission to ratify a decision, four members out of five must vote pro.

=== Commission for Complaints and Sanctions ===
The Commission for Complaints and Sanctions (KAS) is a collegial body composed of 5 members elected for 9-year terms.

Any Albanian citizen who was formerly a judge, clerk for the Constitutional Court or the Supreme Court, a member of the KQZ, a senior civil servant, or a freelance jurist may be proposed to be a member of the KAS. Similarly to the commission, the role is incompatible with any party affiliation or conflict of interest.

The competences of the KAS include:

- declaring an election in a specific voting center, electoral zone, or throughout the country to be invalid, as well as deciding to hold by-elections
- considering complaints brought against the actions of the State Commissioner
- considering complaints brought against the actions of a local election commission
- upon the request of the Commissioner, establishing penalties against election officials in cases of suspected misconduct
- upon the request of the Commissioner, establishing penalties against an individual or electoral subject (and/or the candidates thereof) in cases of suspected misconduct.

Decisions of the KAS are ratified by a simple majority (3 votes pro) in most cases. Declaring an election invalid or considering complaints against the State Commissioner or a local election commission requires a 4-vote supermajority.

== Commissioners ==
No.	Name	Term in office
1	Rexhep Meidani	1991	1992
2	Niko Nosi	1992	1992
3	Vladimir Kristo	1992	1996
4	Nestor Thereska	1996	1997
5	Kristaq Kume	1997	2000
After the CEC became a permanent electoral body
6	Fotaq Nano	12 June 2000	26 January 2001
7	Ilirjan Celibashi	10 February 2001	April 2006
8	Çlirim Gjata	April 2006	2 February 2009
9	Arben Ristani	2 February 2009	3 September 2012
10	Lefterije Luzi	11 October 2012	20 September 2016
11	Denar Biba	3 November 2016	20 May 2017
12	Klement Zguri	22 May 2017	18 September 2020
–	Ilirjan Celibashi	5 October 2020	Incumbent

== Elections ==
In October 2025, the Central Election Commission (CEC) announced that it would test an artificial intelligence system for result calculation during the partial elections of 9 November.
