= Demochristian Party of Albania =

Demochristian Party of Albania Partia Demokristiane e Shqipërisë
- Leader: Nard Ndoka
- Founded: 11 December 1991
- Headquarters: Tirana
- Ideology: Christian democracy; Christian interests
- Political position: Centre-right
- National affiliation: Bashkë Fitojmë; Alliance for a Magnificent Albania
- Colours: Orange, Blue
- Parliament: 0 / 140

Website
- www.pdk.al

The Demochristian Party of Albania (Albanian: Partia Demokristiane e Shqipërisë, PDK) is a small Christian democratic political party in Albania.

== History ==
The PDK's first election was in 1996, where it won no seats in the 140 seat Parliament but took 1.3% of the popular vote. In the following year, 1997, it won a single Assembly seat while taking 1% of the vote. Four years later, in 2001, the PDK again took 1% of the vote but failed to win an Assembly seat. The PDK was substantially more successful in 2005, when it won two Assembly seats and took 3.4% of the vote.

An Extraordinary Congress of PDK held in Tirana on 3 June 2006 elected Nard Ndoka as chairman of PDK. On 8 November 2007 the Party experienced a split, with Nikollë Lesi leaving to form a new party, the Albanian Christian Democratic Movement, which he expects to match the PDK's 2005 performance in the next general election.

=== Timeline ===
- 11 December 1991: An initiating group of intellectuals founded in Tirana The Albanian Christian Democratic Party. Zef Bushati is elected as chairman of the party, CDPA.
- 25 December 1993: The first paper, "Hour of Albania", an official organ of the Christian Democratic Party, is published.
- 27 February 1994: The First Congress of the Albanian Christian Democratic Party develops sessions in Tirana. Zef Bushati is elected as chairman of the party.
- 25 May 1994: The Women's Forum of Christian Democratic Party is formed.
- 17 June 1995: The Albanian Christian Democratic Union is created in Lucerne (Switzerland).
- 1 July 1995: The Albanian Christian Democratic Party is accepted with status of 'observer' in the European Christian-Democratic Union (EUDC) in Bucharest. Participates Chairman CDPA Zef Bushati.
- 2–3 December 1995: The First Congress of Albanian European Democratic-Christian Union (Albania & Kosovo) held sessions in Tirana.Zef Bushati is elected chairman of the Union Albanien Christian Democratic.
- 2 March 1996: The First Congress of the Christian Democratic Youth Forum developed sessions in Tirana. Andi Kroqi is elected chairman.
- 27 April 1996: The Second Congress of Albanian Christian Democratic Party develops its sessions. Zef Bushati is reelected chairman of the party.
- 11 July 1996: The Albanian Christian Democratic Party participates in the new government coalition, with Zef Bushati being appointed as an adviser to the prime minister and Nikolin Kurti as a vice minister.
- 20 October 1996: In local elections the Christian Democratic Party wins the post of Head of Comune of Shëngjin, in region of Lezha, with candidate Gjergj Ivanaj and Head of Comune in Velipojë, with candidate Mark Matusha and many members in councils of city halls, regions and comunes.
- 9 March 1997: The Christian Democratic Party is one of 10 main parties that signed a declaration to overcome the 1997 rebellion in Albania.
- 12 March 1997: National Reconciliation Government is formed and the Christian Democratic Party is represented in cabinet by the Minister of Culture, Engjell Ndocaj.
- 12 June 1997: The Christian Democratic Party participates in the political group Union for Democracy and signs the pre-electoral agreement with the Democratic Party of Albania, the Party of Legality Movement, Social Democratic Union’s Party, and the Democratic Union’s Party.
- 28 June 1997 Christian Democratic Party wins in electoral elections 2 posts for Members of Parliament, Sander Uldedaj in electoral zone nr.1 Malesi e Madhe and Zef Bushati from proportional list.
- 13 August 1997 In Albanian Parliament is created the parliamentary group "The Center of Right Wing". Chairman is elected Zef Bushati.
- 2–6 March 1998 The chairman of CDP, Zef Bushati and the Secretary of Foreign Relations, Frederik Mikeli are invited in Brussels (Belgium) from Wilfried Martens in European Parliament in group of the European People's Party (EPP). Bushati speaks to the eurodeputies about the situation in Albania and in Kosovo.
- 3 October 1998 National Conference of CDP decided to play an active role in compiling process of the Albanian Constitution. The CDP and Bushati proposes the inclusion in constitution of faith in God and Albania as an indivisible state, which were approved by the parliament.
- 17 January 1999: A new electoral campaign of the party is proclaimed.
- 27 November 1999: The chairman, Zef Bushati, participates in the Bureau’s meeting of the ICD in Bucharest. The CDP is accepted member in the ICD and gains the status of observer in the EPP (Bucharest, Romania).
- 29 January 2000 The National Council gathers and determines the date for the sessions of Third Congress.
- 6 May 2000 The Third Congress of CDP develops its sessions. Zef Bushati is reelected chairman of the CDPA.
- 21 May 2000 The National Council gathers and elects the secretary general, two vice-chairman, the bureau as well as the chiefs of departments. Vice-chairman is elected Genc Rama and vice-chairman is elected Mimoza Vreto, secretary general is elected Leodat Kiri.
- 1 October 2000 The elections of local government. CDP wins the posts of 136 councils in districts, city halls and comunes. In national level CDP wins 2.34% listed in the 6th place.
- 28 October 2000 The First National Meeting of the elected from the Christian Democratic Party in local government.
- 5 November 2000 The jubily of governors and members of parliament in Rome, Vatican. (Assemblea dei Parliamentari del Mondo) Participated Chairman Bushati.
- 6–7 January 2001 The Congress of European Popular Parties in Berlin. Participates Chairman CDPA Zef Bushati and the Secretary, Pepa.
- 10 March 2001 The second National meeting of the elected from CDP in local government.
- 21 April 2001 Meeting of National Council, which approves the candidates for deputies of CDP for parliamentary elections of 24 of June 2001.
- 24 June 2001 The parliamentary elections in Albania.
- 8 October 2001 Meeting of National Council of CDPA

== Election results ==
Election	Votes	%	Seats	+/–	Position	Government
1996	???	1.04%	0 / 140	▲0	?	Extra-parliamentary
1997	4,608	0.40%	0 / 155	▲2	▲8	Opposition
2001	12,226	0.90%	0 / 140	▼2	▼9	Extra-parliamentary
2009	13,308	0.88%	0 / 140	0	0	Extra-parliamentary
2013	13,288	0.77%	1 / 140	▲1	▲	Extra-parliamentary
2017	Did not contest		0 / 140	0	—N/a	Extra-parliamentary
2021	Part of PD-AN		0 / 140	0	—N/a	Extra-parliamentary
2025	Part of PD-ASHM		0 / 140	0	—N/a	Extra-parliamentary
