= Nisma Thurje =

Hashtag Initiative Nisma Thurje
- Abbreviation: NTH
- Founder: Pano Soko
- Founded: 12 December 2013; 12 years ago
- Headquarters: Rruga Hoxha Tahsin, Tirana
- Ideology: Populism; Anti-corruption
- Political position: Centre
- International affiliation: Volt Europa
- Colours: Teal
- National Assembly: 0 / 140
- Municipality: 0 / 61
- Council seats: 5 / 1,613

Website
- nisma.al

The Hashtag Initiative or simply # Initiative (Albanian: Nisma Thurje, NTH) is a centrist political movement in Albania was founded after the student protests of 2018 under the leadership of Endri Shabani. Τhe initiative was instrumental in exposing the incinerator scandal.

In 2019, the then leaders of Nisma Thurje, Endri Shabani, Pano Soko, Erion Kristo and Mirush Kabashi toured the country demanding a series of constitutional amendments discussed in the party's charter of 2020. Following the change of the electoral code in 2020, they registered in the 2021 parliamentary elections. According to the party's charter in 2020, their political manifesto is underpinned by three pillars: equal opportunities for progress, participatory democracy and national solidarity.

In November 2025, Nisma Thurje signed a Memorandum of Understanding with Volt Albania to merge under Volt Europa as Nisma Volt, with full unification expected by May 2026.

== History ==
Nisma Thurje is a grassroots movement in Albania. It was founded after the student protests of 2018, by a group of young intellectuals, academics, doctors, engineers, lawyers and journalists. A stated motivation of the founders was to fight inequality and the concentration of power, as well as to promote national solidarity among Albanians. The founders of "Nisma" were worried about the outcomes of heightened concentration of power and wealth in Albania, which has produced deep social divisions and threatens the long economic and political stability of the country. In one interview, Shabani, has stated that "we took an early decision not to fall for the trick of the agenda-setting game, which takes the attention away from the real issues facing the random citizen nowadays and focuses all the nation's eyes on the whims of a one or two people who live disconnected from the very people they pretend to represent".

Thurje grew into a popular grassroots movement of young people, organizing protests, pressuring corrupt politicians, and holding them accountable to their constituencies. Nisma takes a constructive approach, proposing a solution to the issue they raise. It has started several legal initiatives, some of which have been enacted, including amendments to the Albanian Constitution. Their legal initiative to change the electoral system, which was supported by 50,000 voters, generated high public pressure on political parties, leading to a constitutional amendment on 30 July 2020. This initiative encouraged them to take a step further and on 28 November 2020 they announced our intention to seek political representation in Parliament and City Councils. Since 2021, Nisma Thurje has been officially recognised by the Tirana District Court and the Central Electoral Commission as eligible to run for seats in parliament and city councils.

Subsequently, on 24 April "Nisma Thurje" participated in the general election, receiving 10,217 votes nationally. The leader of the party was Endri Shabani, but the leading candidate in the list was co-founder of NTH, Panajot Soko, who is an economist and political activist in Albania.

In the May 2025 parliamentary election, the party ran as part of a Coalition, alongside the Albania Becomes Movement and League for the Rights of Albanian Workers. With 4% of the vote, the Alliance became the third-largest party and won a seat in parliament, which, however, went to the Albania Becomes Movement.

On October 1, 2025, Chairman Endri Shabani resigned, effective October 15. He was succeeded by Elton Çanaj.

== Election results ==
At the 2021 parliamentary election the party ran for the first time, with a national list.

At the 2023 Albanian local elections, the Hashtag Initiative ran with candidates for municipal councils in the regions of Tirana and Durrës and Korça, Shkodër, Lezhë, Elbasan, Fier, and Vlora. They gained 9888 votes on a national level, winning 5 councillor seats in Tirana, Mirditë, Kukës and Korçë. They ran only one candidate in mayoral races, only in Dropull, where they managed to get only 3,87% of the total vote.

Election	Leader	Votes	%	Seats	+/–	Rank	Government
2021	Endri Shabani	10,217	0.65	0 / 140	New	5th	Extra-parliamentary
2025	Endri Shabani	As part of NISMA-SHB		0 / 140	0	▲3rd	Extra-parliamentary

== Merger with Volt Albania ==
On 23 November 2025, Nisma Thurje and Volt Albania announced the signing of a Memorandum of Understanding to formally unite under Volt Europa as Nisma Volt. The agreement marks the first time an Albanian political movement will merge with a pan-European party holding seats in the European Parliament. According to the announcement, the merger reflects a shared commitment to democratic renewal, transparency, and bringing Albania closer to European integration. Brunilda Dhrami, Secretary General of Nisma Thurje, stated that both organizations "share the same values of transparency, civic participation, and public integrity." The merged entity will operate under a democratic party model built on principles including one member-one vote, term limits, open internal elections, and separation between the party's governing board and political leadership. Full unification is expected by May 2026.
