= Lëvizja Shqipëria Bëhet =

Albanian political party

Albania Becomes Movement Lëvizja Shqipëria Bëhet
- Abbreviation: SHB
- Leader: Adriatik Lapaj
- Founder: Adriatik Lapaj
- Founded: 18 September 2023; 3 years ago
- Headquarters: Rruga Jeronim De Rada, Tirana
- Ideology: Populism; Direct democracy; Civic nationalism; Pro-Europeanism
- Political position: Centre to centre-right
- Colours: Black; Orange
- National Assembly: 1 / 140
- Municipality: 0 / 61
- Council Seats: 0 / 1,613

Website
- www.shqiperiabehet.al

The Albania Becomes Movement (Albanian: Lëvizja Shqipëria Bëhet, SHB) is a political party in Albania founded by lawyer and activist Adriatik Lapaj, on 18 September 2023. The party emerged from a civic movement aiming to promote greater democracy, pluralism, and the rule of law in Albania.

Adriatik Lapaj serves as the founder and leader of Shqipëria Bëhet. Known previously for his active role in civil society, Lapaj emphasizes the need for political competition, the enactment of a referendum law, and the depoliticization of public administration.

== History ==
Since its foundation, the party has engaged in nationwide consultations, organizing forums in all 61 municipalities of Albania and reaching out to the diaspora. These efforts aim to involve citizens and experts in legislative advocacy and public debates, strengthening the voice and rights of the populace.

In December 2024, Shqipëria Bëhet extended its outreach to the Albanian diaspora in Michigan, USA, discussing opportunities for investment in key sectors like agriculture and livestock. This initiative seeks to create a bridge between Albania and its diaspora, encouraging contributions to the country's sustainable development.

Shqipëria Bëhet announced its participation in the 2025 Albanian parliamentary election with candidates across multiple constituencies. The party's campaign focuses on electoral reforms, anti-corruption measures, and enhancing direct democracy. Adriatik Lapaj has emphasized the need for a new political alternative that prioritizes civic engagement and institutional transparency.

On 15 October 2024, Adriatik Lapaj announced that Shqipëria Bëhet had been officially registered as a political party in the Albanian court system. This milestone enables the party to participate formally in the country's political processes. In the 2025 Albanian parliamentary election, it will run under the "Initiative Albania Becomes" Coalition, with Nisma Thurje and League for the Rights of Albanian Workers as coalition partners.

== Positions ==
Shqipëria Bëhet focuses on several key reforms:

- Electoral system reform: Advocating for open candidate lists and term limits for governing and representative positions.
- Approval of referendum law: Promoting direct democracy by enabling citizens to participate in decision-making processes through referendums.
- Voting rights for emigrants: Ensuring that Albanian citizens living abroad have the right to vote and proper representation.
- Depoliticization of the electoral administration: Removing political influences from electoral bodies by involving professionals such as lawyers, notaries, and representatives from the justice system.

== Election results ==
=== Parliamentary elections ===
Election	Leader	Votes	%	Seats	+/–	Government
2025	Adriatik Lapaj	64,264	4.00	1 / 140	New	Opposition
