= Flamingo Revolution =

Anti-government protests in Albania

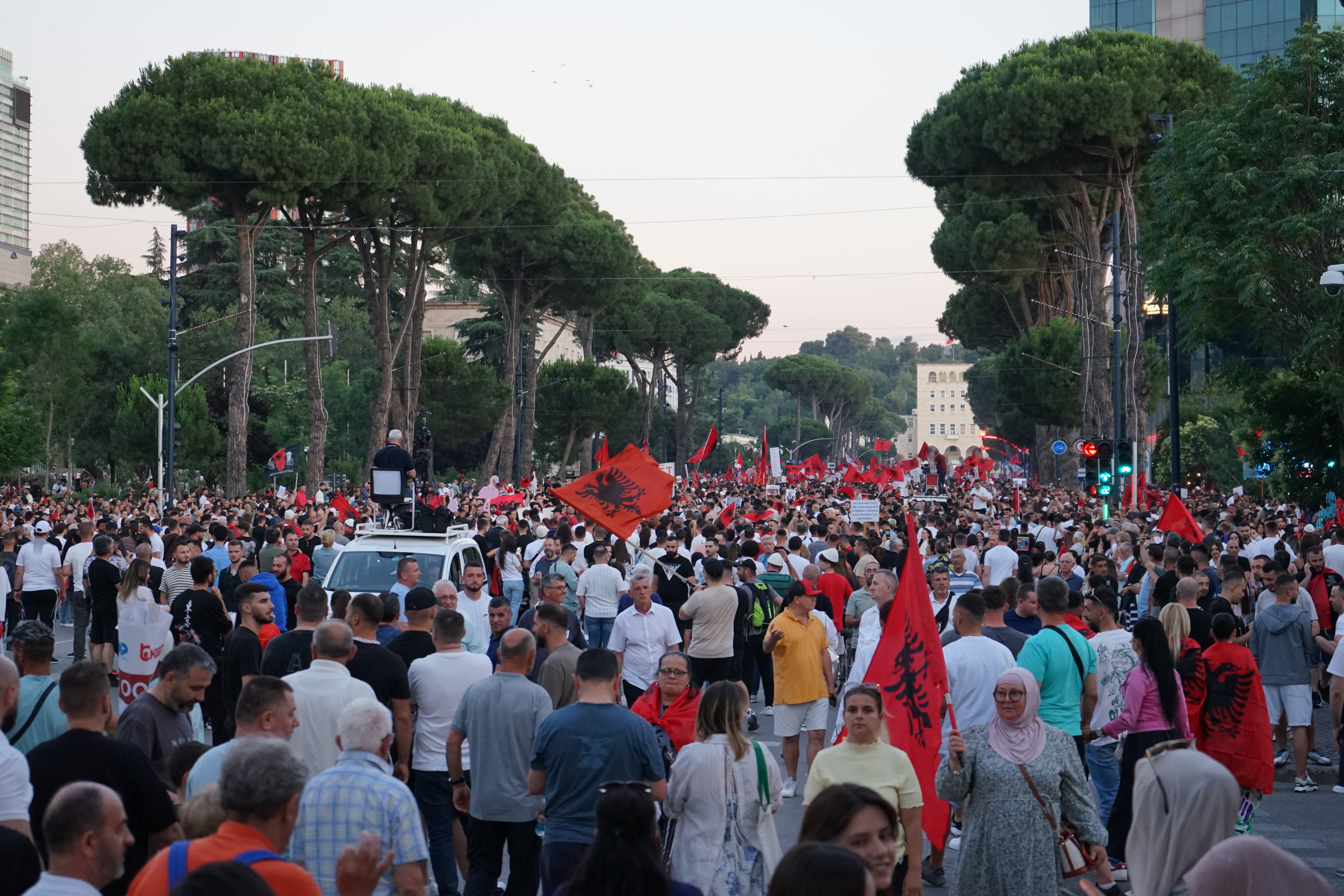
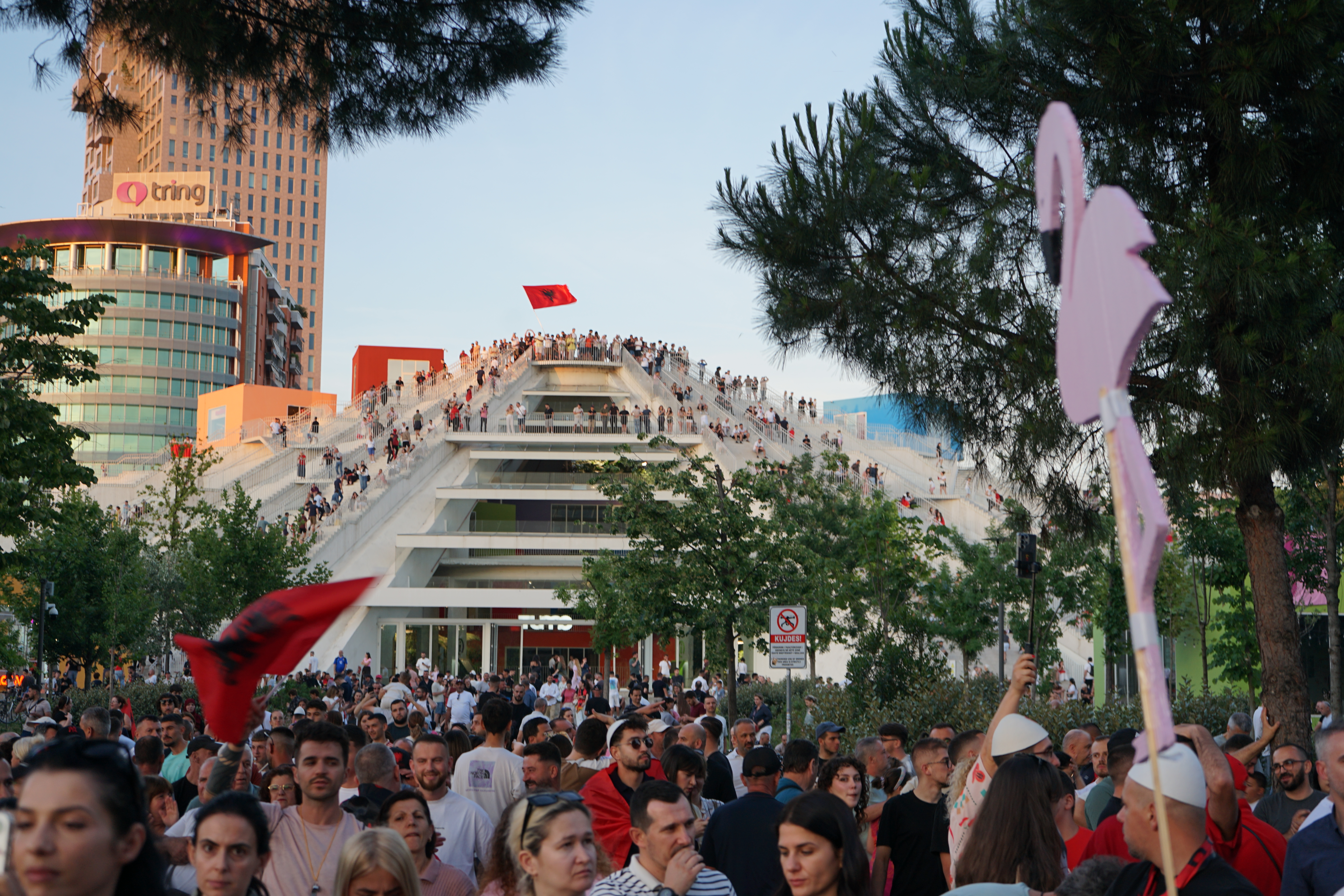
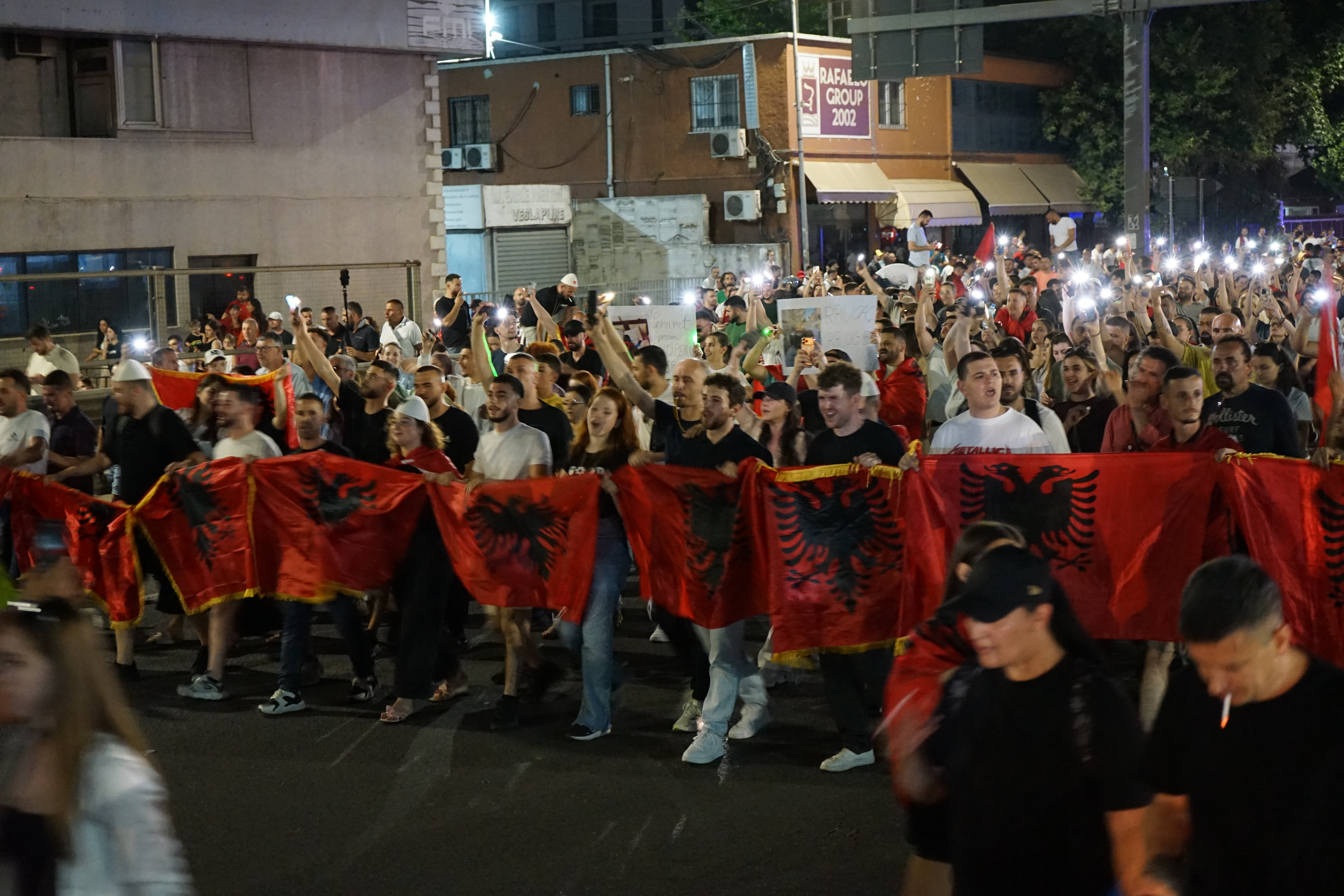
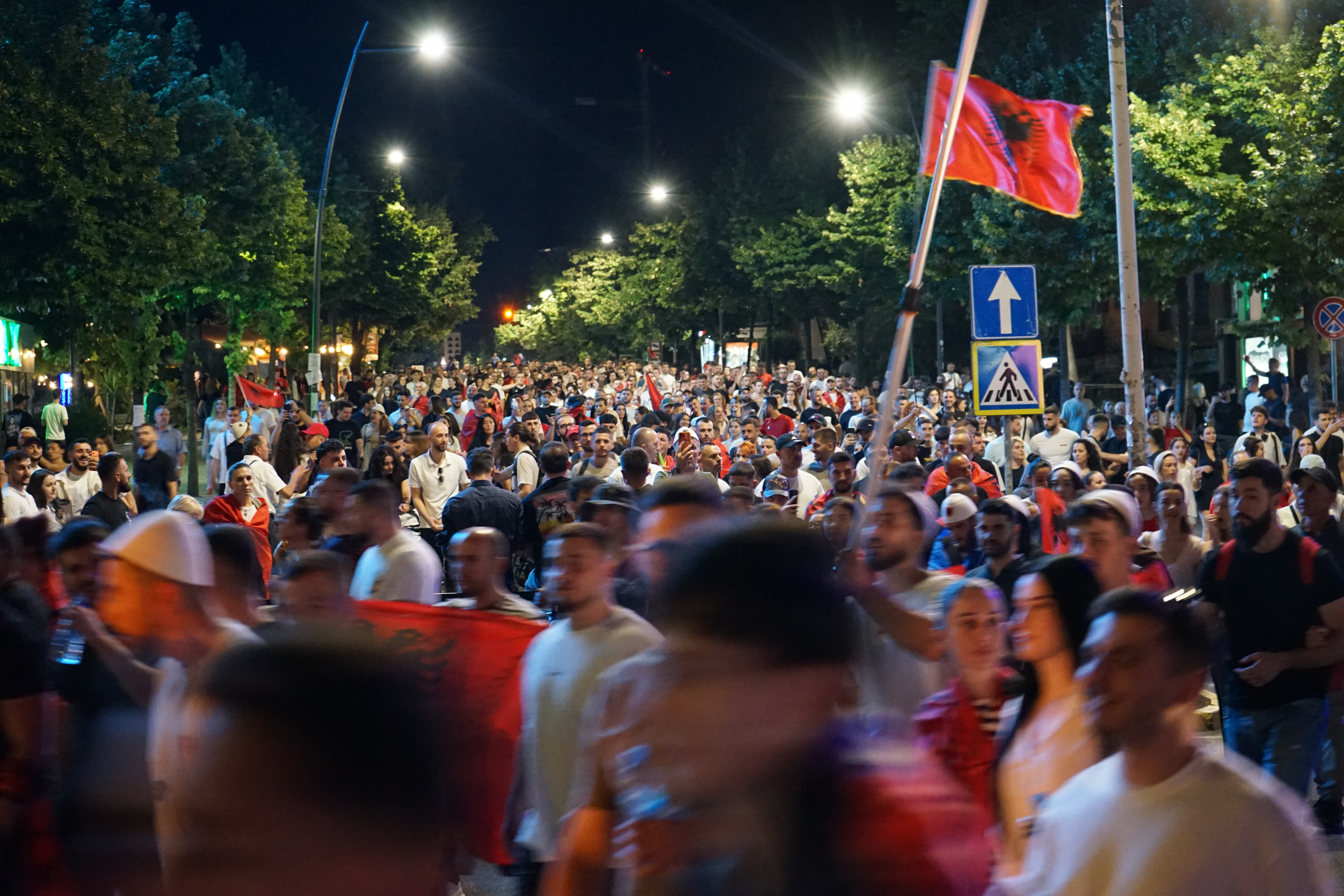
- Part of the Gen Z protests and the 2026 European unrest Protesters in Tirana on 13 and 14 June 2026
- Date: 2 February 2026 – present (9 months and 20 days) (Note: Protests in Rrjoll began on 2 February. Protests in Zvërnec began on 16 May, followed by daily protests in Tirana starting from 30 May.) Flamingo protests: 16 May 2026 – 12 October 2026 (Note: Daily protests on Dëshmorët e Kombit Boulevard in Tirana ended on 12 October. From 13 October, daily demonstrations continued as student-led protests outside the Ministry of Education building in Tirana.); Student-led protests: 13 October 2026 - ongoing
- Location: Albania, and worldwide in the Albanian diaspora
- Caused by: Government corruption, poor governance, state capture and democratic backsliding; Media capture and political disinformation; Violence by private security personnel and allegations of police brutality against protesters; Lack of transparency around foreign-backed development projects and land ownership disputes; Opposition to proposed luxury tourism developments in the Portonovo area, Sazan Island, Zvërnec and Baks-Rrjoll; Environmental concerns in protected coastal zones, including the Vjosa-Narta Protected Landscape and wildlife habitats; Poor education systems, high education costs and lack of employment following graduation
- Goals: Five demands: Resignation of Edi Rama and his government; A 12-month non-partisan transitional government; Constitutional and electoral reforms, including a two-term lifetime limit for the office of prime minister; Repeal or reversal of disputed laws and packages on strategic investments, protected areas, cultural heritage and mountain development; New social contract between citizens and the state
- Methods: Demonstrations, motorcades, political boycotts, internet activism, student strikes Since 13 October 2026: Civil resistance, disobedience and unrest; vandalism, barricades, sit-ins, roadblocks, rioting, arson, university and high-school boycotts
- Status: Ongoing

Parties
Protesters: Anti-government demonstrators; Youth and student protesters; Albanian diaspora protesters; Civil society groups; Environmental activists and organizations; Local residents of Zvërnec, Rrjoll, Nartë and Pishë-Poro; Opposing municipalities (Note: The opposing municipalities are the ones being abolished in the new Territorial Reform.): Belsh; Cërrik; Dimal; Divjakë; Fushë-Arrëz; Këlcyrë; Klos; Libohovë; Maliq; Memaliaj; Patos; Poliçan; Prrenjas; Rrogozhinë; Selenicë; Supported by: PPNEA / BirdLife Albania; Opportunity Party; Lëvizja Bashkë; Lëvizja Shqipëria Bëhet	Democratic Party / ASHM (Note: The Democratic Party's position was initially contested. Berisha first expressed support for foreign investment and for the Zvërnec project while condemning violence against protesters. By 7–10 June, the party moved toward supporting the protests, although some demonstrators continued to criticize Berisha and the Democratic Party as part of the old political class.): Forumi Rinor i Partisë Demokratike; Freedom Party of Albania; Legality Movement Party; Environmentalist Agrarian Party; Unity for Human Rights Party; Republican Party of Albania	Government of Albania: Socialist Party of Albania; Social Democratic Party of Albania; Albanian Police; Shqiponjat; FNSH; RENEA (on 17 Oct 2026); Associated project entities: Zvërnec South Adriatic Development; Affinity Partners; Private security personnel

Lead figures
Decentralised leadership	Sali Berisha	Government: Edi Rama; Taulant Balla; Skënder Hita; Zvërnec project: Jared Kushner; Ivanka Trump

Casualties and losses
400+ protesters, civilians or journalists injured, medically treated or hospitalized		160+ police officers affected or medically treated

Casualties, detentions and damage
- Arrested: 2,000+ people arrested
- Damage: 3+ police cars destroyed, vehicles destroyed and damaged, with violence directed towards many properties around Tirana
- Detained: 400+ protesters being detained or escorted by police; court measures for 21 detainees included two under house arrest, 14 reporting obligations and five without a security measure
- Charged: Thousands+ reported instances of criminal proceedings against protesters; two people were additionally declared wanted

The Flamingo Revolution (Albanian: Revolucioni i Flamingove) is a decentralised social movement and series of protests primarily against the Government of Albania. The initial protests took place in Baks-Rrjoll on 2 February 2026 when residents protested against the planned Blue Borgo resort and disputed land ownership. A major wave of protests followed on 16 May at Zvërnec, near the Narta Lagoon, over preparatory works and proposed luxury tourism developments linked to the Sazan Island and Zvërnec resort project, backed by American investor Jared Kushner. Violence against protesters near the Zvërnec project site on 30 May triggered further demonstrations in Tirana the following day. The protests subsequently broadened from Baks-Rrjoll, Zvërnec and Tirana and later spread to other cities in Albania, Kosovo and Albanian diaspora communities abroad.

As the demonstrations expanded, they evolved into broader opposition against the government of prime minister Edi Rama, corruption, state capture, media capture, poor governance and democratic backsliding. On 22 June, protesters formalized five demands: Rama's resignation; the formation of a 12-month non-partisan technical government; constitutional and electoral reforms, including a two-term lifetime limit for the prime minister; the repeal or reversal of disputed laws concerning strategic investments, protected areas, cultural heritage and mountain development; and a new social contract between citizens and the state. Many demonstrations have also criticized leader of the opposition Sali Berisha and the Democratic Party of Albania, with slogans portraying both Rama and Berisha as part of the same political establishment.

The main protests have been centered in Tirana, especially around Skanderbeg Square, the prime minister's office, Dëshmorët e Kombit Boulevard, Parliament and other symbolic public spaces. Daily demonstrations drew tens of thousands of participants, while larger nationwide and diaspora-focused mobilizations were held throughout June to July. The 20 June protest became the largest demonstration of the movement to date, with Albanian media estimating more than 250,000 participants and describing the crowd as filling much of Dëshmorët e Kombit Boulevard, from Skanderbeg Square to Mother Teresa Square. The movement has been described as part of the Gen Z protests, with Generation Z and Millennial protesters playing a prominent role, alongside civil society groups, environmental activists, local residents, public figures and diaspora communities. Since October 2026, the demonstrations have escalated as part of the student protests and riots following poor conditions in Albania's education systems, as well as the rise in the high cost of education.

The flamingo, a wild bird that inhabits the Vjosa–Narta wetland ecosystem, is the main symbol of the demonstrations, giving rise to the name Flamingo Revolution. Protesters have used flamingo cutouts, inflatable flamingos, national flags and modified protest imagery to represent both environmental protection and wider civic resistance.

Rama defended the Sazan Island and Zvërnec resort project as a major foreign investment and rejected allegations of unlawful conduct, suggesting the movement was influenced by misinformation or foreign interests and later describing it as part of a "hybrid war" used by "enemies of Israel and Albania". The movement has received further criticism from other members of the Socialist Party, Berisha and members of the Democratic Party, and other political figures. The movement has received public support from former officials, dissenters of the Socialist Party and several minor opposition parties in Albania, including the Opportunity Party, Lëvizja Bashkë and Lëvizja Shqipëria Bëhet.

== Background ==
=== Sazan Island Resort ===
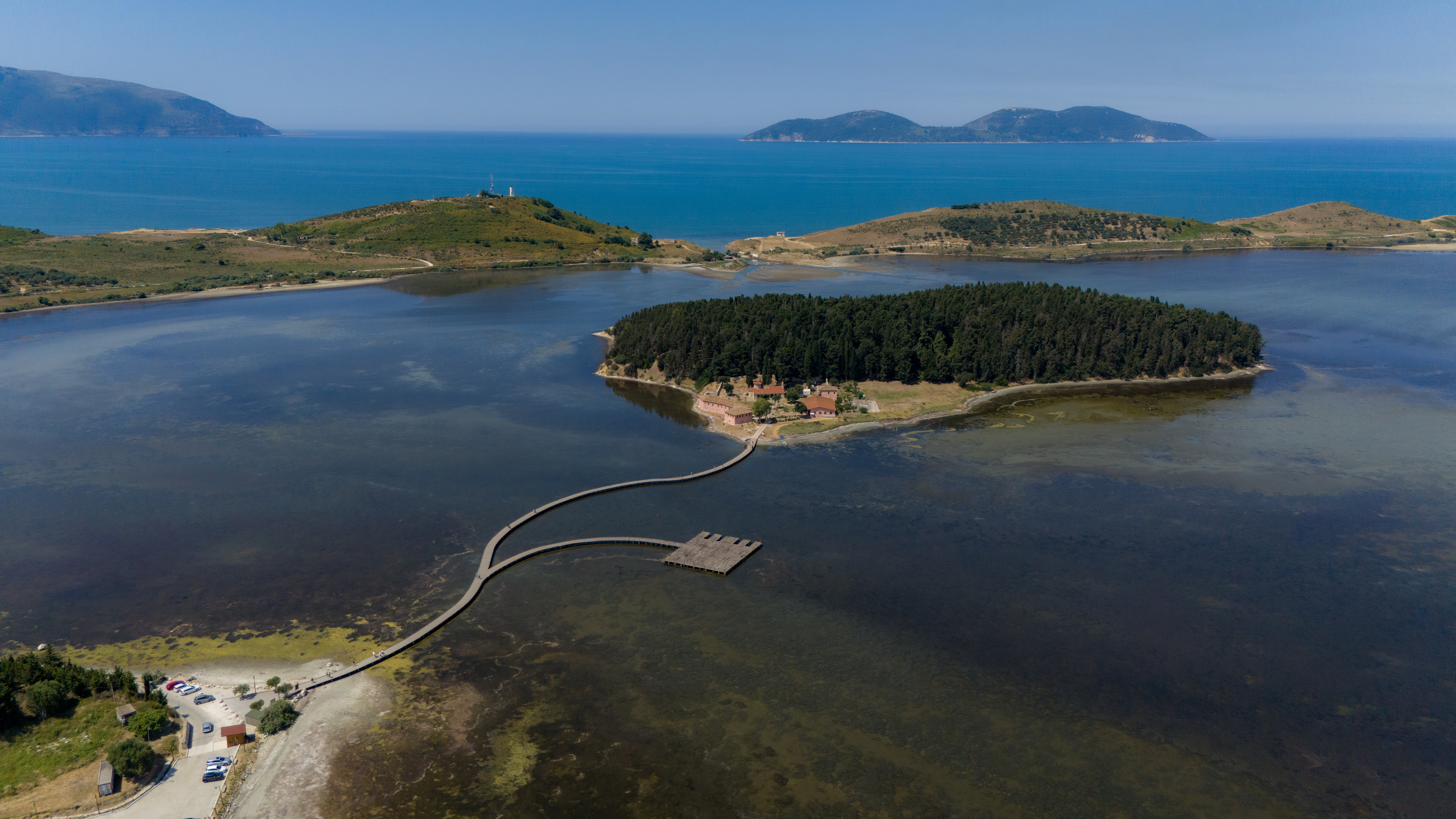
View over the Narta Lagoon with Sazan in the background

Ivanka Trump and her husband, Jared Kushner, first visited Albania on a private trip in July 2021. Trump and Kushner travelled the entire coastline on a yacht owned by Nathaniel Rothschild, a friend of theirs. While out swimming, they encountered the uninhabited, biodiverse island of Sazan, an abandoned military base, and were surprised it had remained undeveloped. Prime Minister Edi Rama met them on the yacht during the trip and discussed investment opportunities with Kushner a year later.

In March 2024, Kushner announced plans to invest in Sazan and the nearby coastal area on the mainland, near the village of Zvërnec. Environmental groups such as BirdLife have connected Kushner's tourism development project to an amendment to Albania's Protected Areas Law, passed shortly prior. It exempted "structures of excellence, 5 stars or more", and related hospitality activities from restrictions on construction in environmentally protected areas, such as where the project was proposed.

The Albanian government granted the Sazan project strategic investment status on 30 December 2025, noting that it would occupy 565 hectares and some 45 hectares would be developed. In 2025, Prime Minister Rama said that Albania "can't afford not to exploit a gift like Sazan" and needed luxury tourism. The land on Sazan was sold in a €1.4-billion deal, which locals and parliamentarians were unaware of until newspapers reported it. Afterwards, Albanians began referring to Sazan as "Trump Island" (Ishulli i Trumpëve).

Kushner also has plans for a larger second site: the undeveloped coastal stretch of Pishë Poro-Narta within the Vjosa–Narta Protected Landscape. It is home to endangered species such as monk seals, sea turtles and more than 200 bird species, including flamingos and pelicans. Over 10,000 accommodation units are planned. Kushner said that he wanted "to create the ideal resort that I'd want to be at with my family and with my friends", and that the government had been very cooperative. According to Rama, the projects together are worth up to €5 billion.

Ivanka Trump is also linked to the project. She mentioned her and Kushner's plans on podcasts, bringing them to wider attention. Her description of Sazan as their "private island" angered Albanians. The project became the subject of public debate. Opponents, including residents and environmental organizations, expressed concerns regarding the potential environmental impact of the development and raised questions concerning land ownership within the project area. Representatives of the project stated that the development was being pursued in accordance with Albanian law and applicable planning procedures.

=== Corruption and state capture ===
The resort controversy developed against a broader background of public concern over corruption, state capture and the relationship between political power, private business interests and public institutions in Albania. Freedom House classified Albania as "Partly Free" in its 2025 report and stated that corruption and bribery remained major problems despite reforms in the justice system. The European Commission's 2025 Albania report stated that the institutional framework for fighting corruption was in place, but that preventive measures still needed improvement and that the state police remained highly vulnerable to corruption, while also noting positive results by SPAK in high-level corruption cases.

Commentators connected the protests to wider grievances about oligarchic influence, opaque public decision-making and the use of laws for private or politically connected interests. BiEPAG described the Flamingo Revolution as exposing Albania's "systemic weaknesses", including private security violence, opaque legal amendments and a captured media landscape. Other analysis described the protests as a channel for wider anger at political elites accused of abusing power and institutions, capturing parts of the media landscape and using the law for partisan purposes.

Several high-profile corruption and procurement cases during Rama's premiership contributed to the broader climate in which the protests developed. In the Albanian incinerators scandal, former environment minister Lefter Koka was sentenced to prison on corruption, abuse-of-power and money-laundering charges related to waste-incinerator contracts, while former deputy prime minister Arben Ahmetaj was charged in connection with the same affair and left Albania; Ahmetaj denied wrongdoing. The AKSHI public procurement scandal also became part of wider criticism of state contracting, after SPAK investigated alleged manipulation of public tenders at the National Agency for Information Society (AKSHI), an agency under the authority of the Prime Minister's office that managed major digital-infrastructure and eAlbania contracts.

=== Democratic backsliding and concentration of power ===
The protests also took place in the context of concerns about democratic backsliding, concentration of power and long-term political polarisation. The Socialist Party, led by Edi Rama, has governed Albania since 2013 and won a fourth consecutive parliamentary election in 2025. Freedom House described Albanian politics as competitive but highly polarised, with political parties often organised around leading personalities.

Analysts argued that the dominance of the Socialist Party under Rama and the Democratic Party under Sali Berisha had left limited space for credible political alternatives and had contributed to a toxic political environment. In this interpretation, the protests expressed not only opposition to the resort project, but also fatigue with both the government and the established opposition. The chants "Rama to prison, Berisha to prison" ("Rama në burg, Berisha në burg!") reflected this broader rejection of the two dominant political camps. Criticism of Berisha was also reinforced by the Rrjoll dispute, where resort developer Bashkim Ulaj had been described in Albanian media as close to the Berisha family, and residents publicly questioned Berisha's lack of support for their protest. Rama's governing style was also described by critics as increasingly associated with concentrated decision-making and reduced space for parliamentary dialogue or civil society consultation.

Election-related controversies under Rama also formed part of the protesters' wider criticism of state institutions and political power. In 2019, Bild published audio recordings connected to the 2017 parliamentary elections, including conversations involving Socialist officials and local power brokers that opposition parties and critics described as evidence of vote-buying, intimidation and links between politics and organised crime. The Patronageists scandal in 2021 raised further concerns about the use of personal data and party-linked voter monitoring, after Lapsi.al reported that a database allegedly connected to the Socialist Party contained personal information and political-preference notes for around 910,000 voters or residents of Tirana. The OSCE/ODIHR final report on the 2025 parliamentary election later stated that the vote was competitive and professionally managed, but that contestants did not enjoy a level playing field and cited allegations of intimidation, misuse of public resources, pressure on public employees and vote-buying.

Concerns about the separation of powers also grew in 2026 after Rama announced plans for legislation that would prevent courts from suspending ministers under criminal investigation. Reuters reported that opposition parties said the proposal would undermine judicial independence and protect Rama's allies, while Rama accused the judiciary of overreach. The proposal followed corruption proceedings against senior government figures, including Deputy Prime Minister and Infrastructure Minister Belinda Balluku, who denied allegations over the alleged manipulation of public tenders.

=== Media capture and government influence ===
Concerns over media capture and political influence over public information also formed part of the background to the protests. The 2026 World Press Freedom Index, issued by Reporters Without Borders, ranked Albania 83rd out of 180 countries, stating that press freedom and media independence were threatened by conflicts of interest between business and politics, a flawed legal framework and partisan regulation. It also stated that journalists who were critical of the authorities were often subjected to discrediting attacks, that access to state-held information was difficult, and that self-censorship was widespread.

Transparency International EU similarly noted concerns about concentration of mass media ownership, lack of transparency in mass media ownership, and the independence of public service media, while also reporting an increase in attacks against journalists in 2025.

During the early phase of the protests, media capture became one of the issues raised by commentators and activists. BiEPAG argued that several mainstream outlets had ignored live coverage or spread disinformation about the protests, including by amplifying claims that the demonstrations were externally sponsored or motivated by foreign interests. Reporter.al also described the use of artificial-intelligence-generated images and police-camera material against the protest narrative, linking the information campaign to attempts to discredit the movement. The reliance of protesters on social media, livestreams, memes and diaspora networks was therefore partly framed as a response to distrust of traditional media and perceived government influence over national broadcasters and major private outlets.

Earlier media-freedom disputes under Rama also shaped the protest movement's distrust of mainstream media and official narratives. In 2019, Rama's government proposed changes to Albania's media legislation, known by critics as the "anti-defamation" package, which would have allowed the Audiovisual Media Authority to fine online media outlets and order the removal or blocking of content. Albanian and international media organisations criticised the draft laws as a threat to free expression and online journalism. The Albanian Ombudsman said the draft laws did not meet international standards, while the Venice Commission later identified several flaws and recommended changes intended to protect freedom of expression.

Rama has also clashed publicly with Reporters Without Borders over assessments of media freedom in Albania. After Albania's fall in the World Press Freedom Index, Rama dismissed parts of the organisation's criticism as "lies" and "fantasies". Reporters Without Borders responded by criticising his treatment of journalists and by pointing to political attacks and pressure on critical reporters.

=== Beginning of the protests ===
Residents of Zvërnec were not informed about the development and became aware almost exclusively through media reports. At the end of April 2026, the company Zvërnec South Adriatic Development fenced off part of the protected coastal area of Zvërnec-Portonovo as part of the preparations using a disputed work permit. Residents, such as village headman Kostaq Konomi, said that the beach contained ancestral properties claimed within cadastral zone 3951; for two decades, locals have been involved in legal land disputes with businessmen such as Artur Shehu.

Reporter.al, the Albanian outlet of the Balkan Investigative Reporting Network, reported that Zvërnec South Adriatic Development was established in August 2024 and owned by Dutch Trust Management B.V, a Dutch trust, obscuring the owners' identities. The company is linked through a network of shell companies to the Sazan Island project and to Qatari investor brothers Ramez Al-Khayyat and Mohamad Al-Khayyat. The outlet also reported that the company had secured two unpublished development permits from the National Territorial Council for tourist resorts in Zvërnec, which had not been officially published, and that later preparatory fencing and access-road works were carried out after company representatives presented inspectors with an AZHT document that Reporter.al said was still awaiting formal approval. During the 2026 protests, Rama confirmed Kushner and Trump's involvement but also said that there was a wider group of investors and architects from Denmark, France, Greece, Japan, and Turkey.

On 30 May 2026, activists and local residents were assaulted by private security personnel. Police were present but did not intervene as a demonstrator was dragged inside the fenced area. These events expanded the local dispute into mass protests in Tirana.

=== Symbols ===
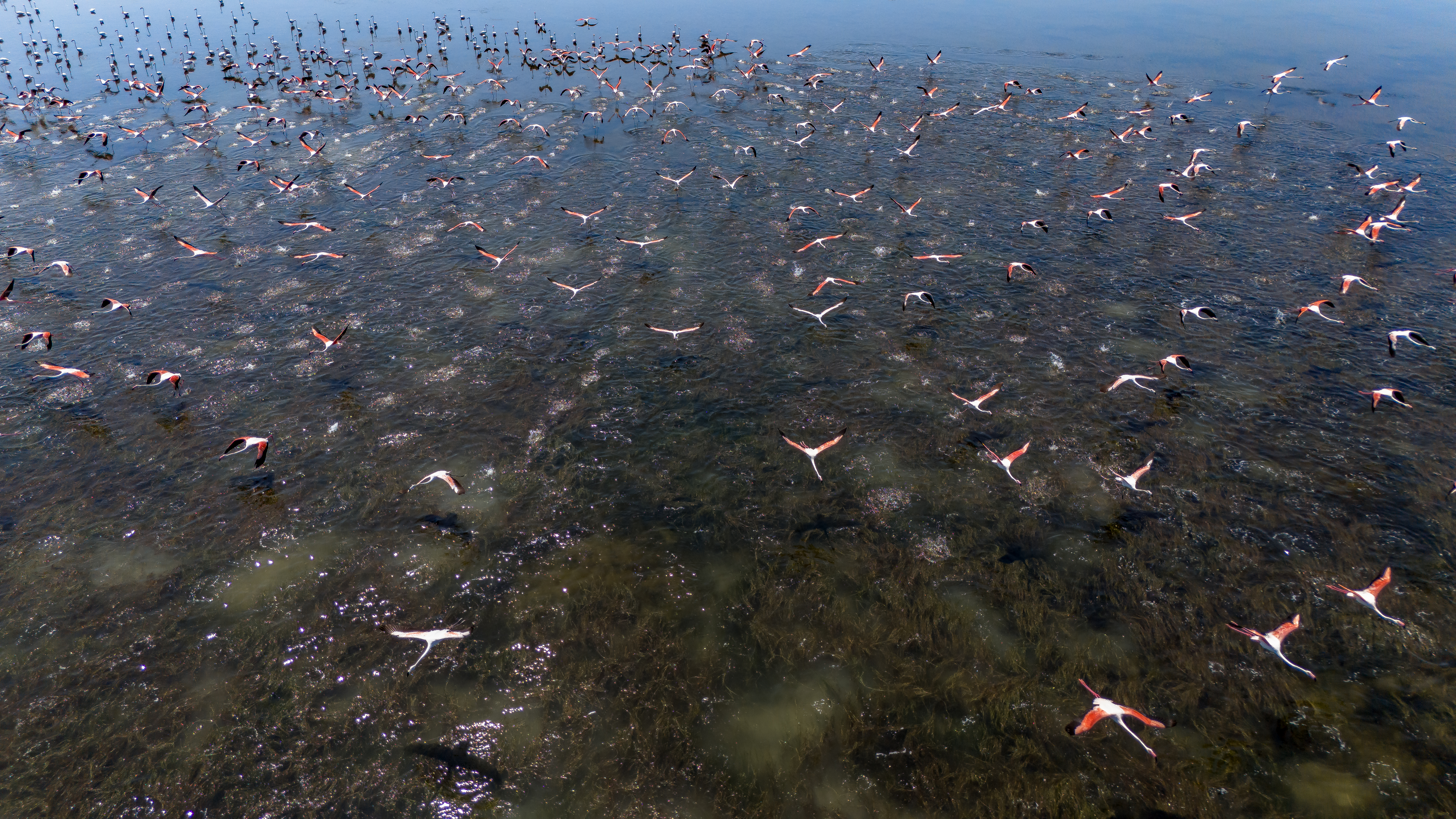
View of flamingos flying over the Narta Lagoon

The flamingo became a symbol of the protests, which were described by several media outlets as the "Flamingo Revolution". Greater flamingos (Phoenicopterus roseus) are among the species that inhabit the protected Vjosa–Narta wetland ecosystem. During demonstrations, protesters carried flamingo cutouts and inflatable flamingos.

Some protest imagery replaced the eagle on the flag of Albania with flamingos and changed the red background to blue, a reference to the sea and wetland ecosystem. BalkanWeb described the flamingo as a civic protest symbol that was not directly associated with any existing Albanian political party.

The Straw Hats' Jolly Roger flag from the manga series One Piece was also reported to have appeared at the protests. The flag has been used in other youth-led protest movements internationally as a symbol of resistance to authority. Some sources have described the demonstrations as Gen Z protests due to Generation Z's prominent role in their organization and symbolism.

== Demands ==
The movement's stated demands combined political, constitutional, economic and environmental objectives. The five-demand document was drafted by the Protest Coordinating Group following proposals received from citizens during more than three weeks of demonstrations. It was read publicly for the first time on 22 June by Dritan Goxhaj, a former Albanian army officer described by Albanian media as a former Kosovo Liberation Army fighter. The coordinating group subsequently sent the document in a formal letter to Western ambassadors and heads of diplomatic missions accredited in Albania. The letter was signed on behalf of the group by Entela Koja, Arben Kola, Megan Balaj, Edviol Kulluri, Luçjana Kokaj, Gentjan Progni, Gjon Ndoj, Etleva Merko, Everest Bardhi, Përparim Gjeka, Mevlan Mata, Ilir Xhemalaj and Marjen Rama.

1. The non-negotiable resignation of Prime Minister Edi Rama and the entire government cabinet.
2. The establishment of a non-partisan technical transitional government with a clearly defined 12-month mandate.
3. The drafting of a new constitution guaranteeing full equality of citizens before the law, to be approved through a national referendum. The proposed constitutional reform would include:
  1. Amendment of the Electoral Code.
  2. Amendment of legislation governing the financing of political parties and organizations.
  3. A lifetime limit of no more than two full or partial terms for any individual serving as prime minister.
4. The continued pursuit of the movement's initial economic and environmental demands, including:
  1. Repeal of the amendments to the law on protected areas.
  2. Repeal of the amendments to the law on cultural heritage.
  3. Repeal of the legislative package known as the "Mountain Package".
  4. Repeal of the status and legal framework governing strategic investments.
5. The establishment of a new social contract between citizens and the state, to be drafted through consultations with intellectuals, technical experts and non-partisan citizens proposed directly by participants in the protest square.

== Protests ==
=== February 2026: initial protests ===
On 2 February 2026, residents of Baks-Rrjoll in the Velipojë area began a renewed protest wave against the Blue Borgo tourism development after construction machinery returned to the site. Residents said that land claimed by local families was being used for the project while ownership disputes remained unresolved. By 4 February, Albanian media described the demonstrations as being in their third consecutive day, with clashes between residents and police and representatives of roughly 60 families calling for the works to stop.

The Rrjoll dispute centred on a resort project associated with businessman Bashkim Ulaj and his company Gener 2. The protests broadened beyond the construction site, including a demonstration outside SPAK and calls for investigation of alleged property-document irregularities.

The Rrjoll protests also led to criticism of the established opposition. Local coverage questioned the absence of Democratic Party representatives from the demonstrations, and one resident publicly criticized Sali Berisha for not supporting the protest against Ulaj's resort. Albanian media have also described Ulaj as a businessman or publisher close to the Berisha family; this relationship formed part of protesters' criticism of Berisha's position, although such descriptions do not establish that Berisha had a formal role in the Rrjoll development.

=== May 2026: Zvërnec and the national trigger ===
On 16 May, the first protest against the project was held at the Akërni construction site in the Pishë Poro–Narta area. Local residents and environmental activists marched to the fenced site, removed part of its entrance and entered the construction area, arguing that the works threatened a protected landscape and that information about the development had not been made public. The National Inspectorate for Territorial Protection said that the activity consisted of fencing and preparatory work for access roads on privately registered land and was covered by a development permit and an environmental-impact report.

On 23 May, local residents and environmental activists gathered near the Narta Lagoon to protest the barbed-wire fencing of Pishë Poro-Narta beach, part of the protected Vjosa–Narta landscape. According to Reporter.al, protesters carried banners defending the natural environment and opposing what they described as the seizure of local property by business interests linked to the government.

On 26 May, activists and supporters gathered outside the Ministry of Environment in Tirana, demanding an immediate halt to the works in Pishë Poro–Narta, publication of the relevant documentation and intervention by the responsible state institutions.

On 30 May, demonstrators gathered near the project site in Portonovo. During the protest, confrontations occurred between protesters and private security personnel present at the site. Videos and photographs published by Albanian activists and journalists showed physical altercations and the use of pepper spray, which reportedly affected police officers and Lëvizja Bashkë activist and journalist Loreta Koleci. Following the incident, Albanian authorities announced investigations into the conduct of those involved.

The Albanian Helsinki Committee later stated that, according to its monitoring, the protest had begun peacefully and escalated after a local resident participating in the demonstration was forcibly dragged inside the fenced construction area by civilians who were not part of the contracted Myrto private-security structure. The committee called for a full investigation into the use of force by unauthorized persons and into reports that pepper spray had affected both protesters and police officers.

On 31 May, following the violence at Zvërnec, the protests expanded substantially in Tirana and began their sustained daily phase. Demonstrators marched from the State Police Directorate to the Ministry of Interior and then to the prime minister's office, calling for accountability over the Zvërnec violence and using slogans including "Albania is not for sale" and "cancel the project".

=== June 2026 ===
On 1–2 June, daily demonstrations continued in Tirana against the planned resort project. Protesters gathered in Skanderbeg Square and marched toward the prime minister's office, opposing construction in protected areas, demanding transparency over the development contracts and increasingly calling for the resignation of Prime Minister Edi Rama. Organized groups refused Rama's offer to meet a 20-person delegation, choosing instead to continue public demonstrations.

From 1 June onward, the movement maintained a daily evening demonstration in Tirana, generally beginning with a gathering in Skanderbeg Square, followed by speeches outside the prime minister's office and a march through central streets. The demonstrations initially began at 18:00; from 17 June, the start time was moved to 19:00 because of high temperatures.

At the same time, the Albanian Coalition for the Family and Life held a separate March for Life from Skanderbeg Square to the Ministry of Health, opposing a ministry order concerning hormone treatment for transgender patients in the public health system and calling for its withdrawal pending broader consultation.

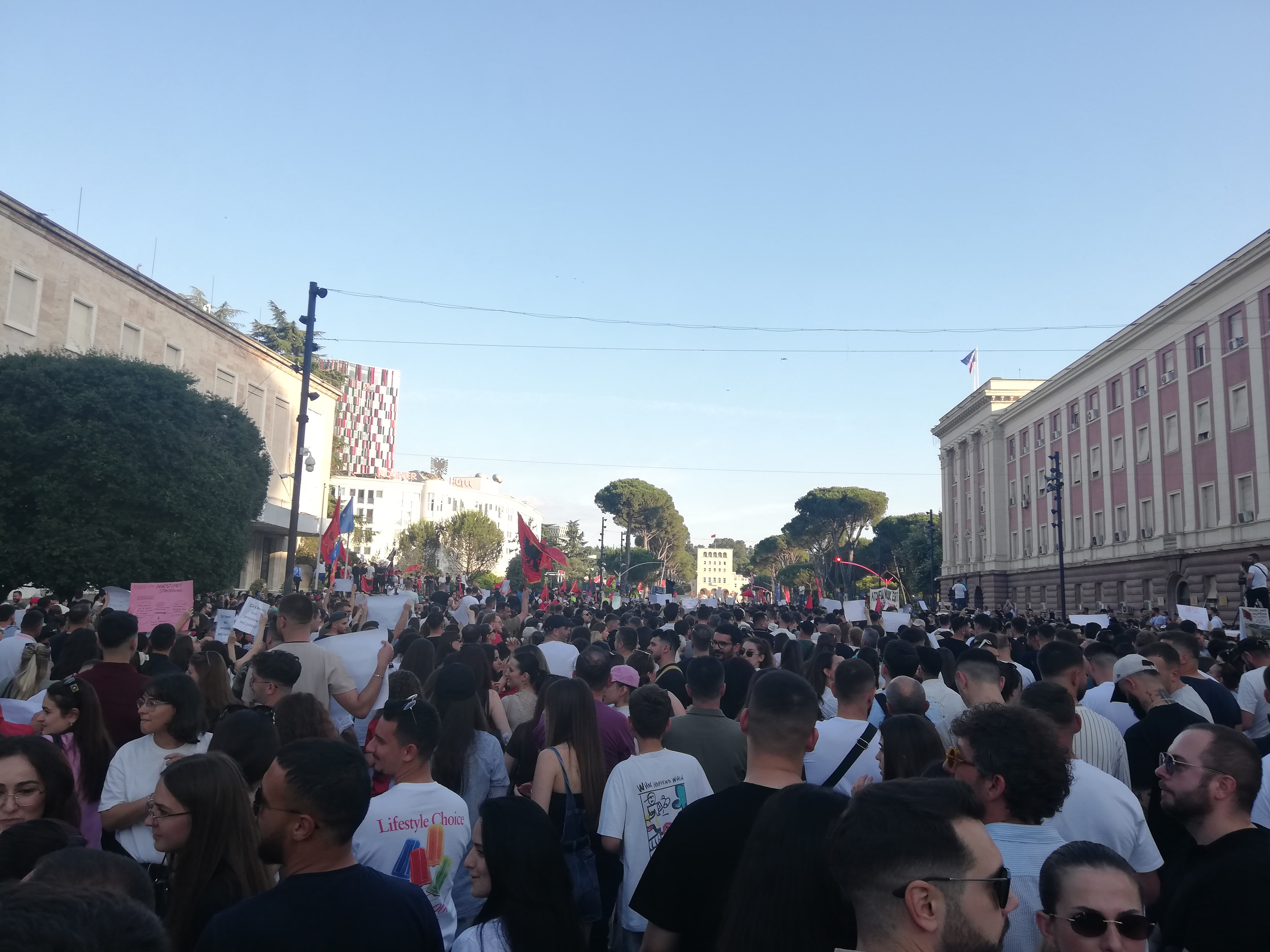
Protesters in Tirana on 2 June

On 3 June, the protests escalated in Tirana. Demonstrators demanded Rama's resignation, criticized opposition leader Sali Berisha and called for the repeal of changes to the law on protected areas. The Associated Press reported that demonstrators broke through a police cordon and that police used water cannon to disperse the crowd. Protesters also stopped outside the Democratic Party of Albania headquarters, criticizing the party's position on the project and Berisha's earlier support for it. A small number of anti-Israel messages appeared during the early demonstrations; international and regional sources described these as conspiracy narratives and not representative of the movement's main demands.

From 4-9 June, the Tirana demonstrations continued and the movement spread to other Albanian cities, including Korçë, Fier, Kukës, Vlorë, Elbasan, Durrës, Shkodër, Pogradec, Gjirokastër and Lezhë. On 6 June, a separate gathering was held at Dalan beach in the Zvërnec area, returning the demonstrations to the coast near the proposed development. On 8 June, demonstrators gathered below Rozafa Castle during Rama's visit to Shkodër, opposing the developments at both Zvërnec and Rrjoll. On 9 June, protesters marched through central Lezhë and raised broader concerns about living costs, unemployment and emigration, while smaller gatherings continued in Elbasan and Gjirokastër. Reuters and Al Jazeera reported that several thousand people continued to protest in Tirana while holding flamingo symbols and calling for the project to stop.

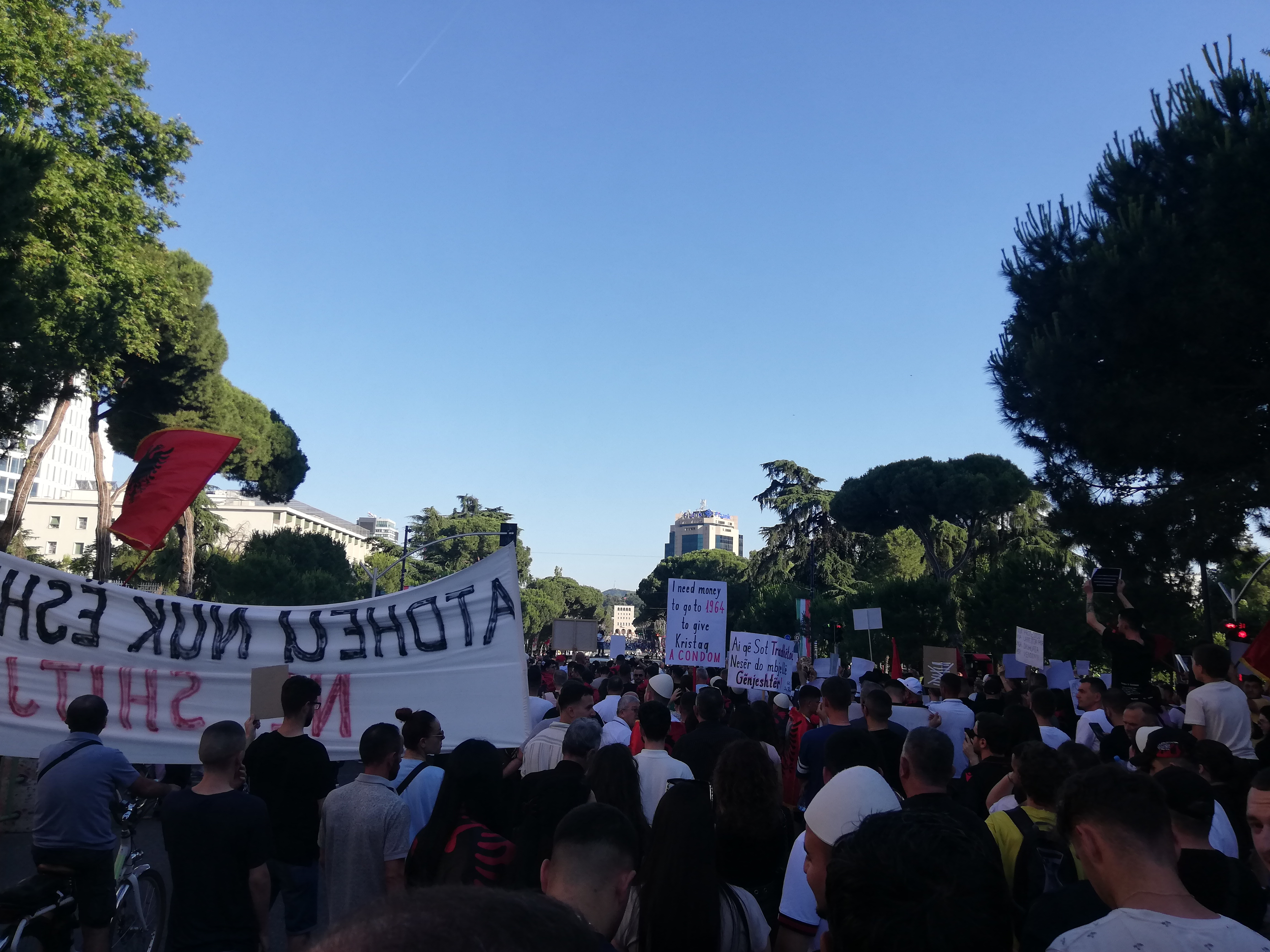
Protesters in Tirana on 7 June

On 8 June, tensions were reported inside the protest movement after members of the Youth Forum of the Democratic Party of Albania attempted to join the Tirana demonstration. Some protesters opposed their participation and accused the Democratic Party of trying to take over or divide the movement, while organizers later limited public speeches to selected representatives from fields such as science and education.

On 10 June, the protest in Tirana was organized as a larger nationwide gathering and coincided with the 148th anniversary of the League of Prizren. Hundreds of thousands of people participated in the protest. Protesters used the slogan "Prizren 1878, Tirana 2026", while media and commentators described the movement as having broadened from opposition to the Zvërnec project into a wider challenge to the political system, the main parties and the Rama government.

On 13 June, residents of Rrjoll protested against a separate resort construction project, broke through part of the fencing around the site and entered the construction area, with tensions reported between residents, police and private security. Later the same day, the Tirana protest became one of the largest gatherings of the movement, with strong participation from the Albanian diaspora. International media estimated the crowd at 100,000 to 200,000 participants, while protesters continued demanding Rama's resignation and action against corruption across the political class.

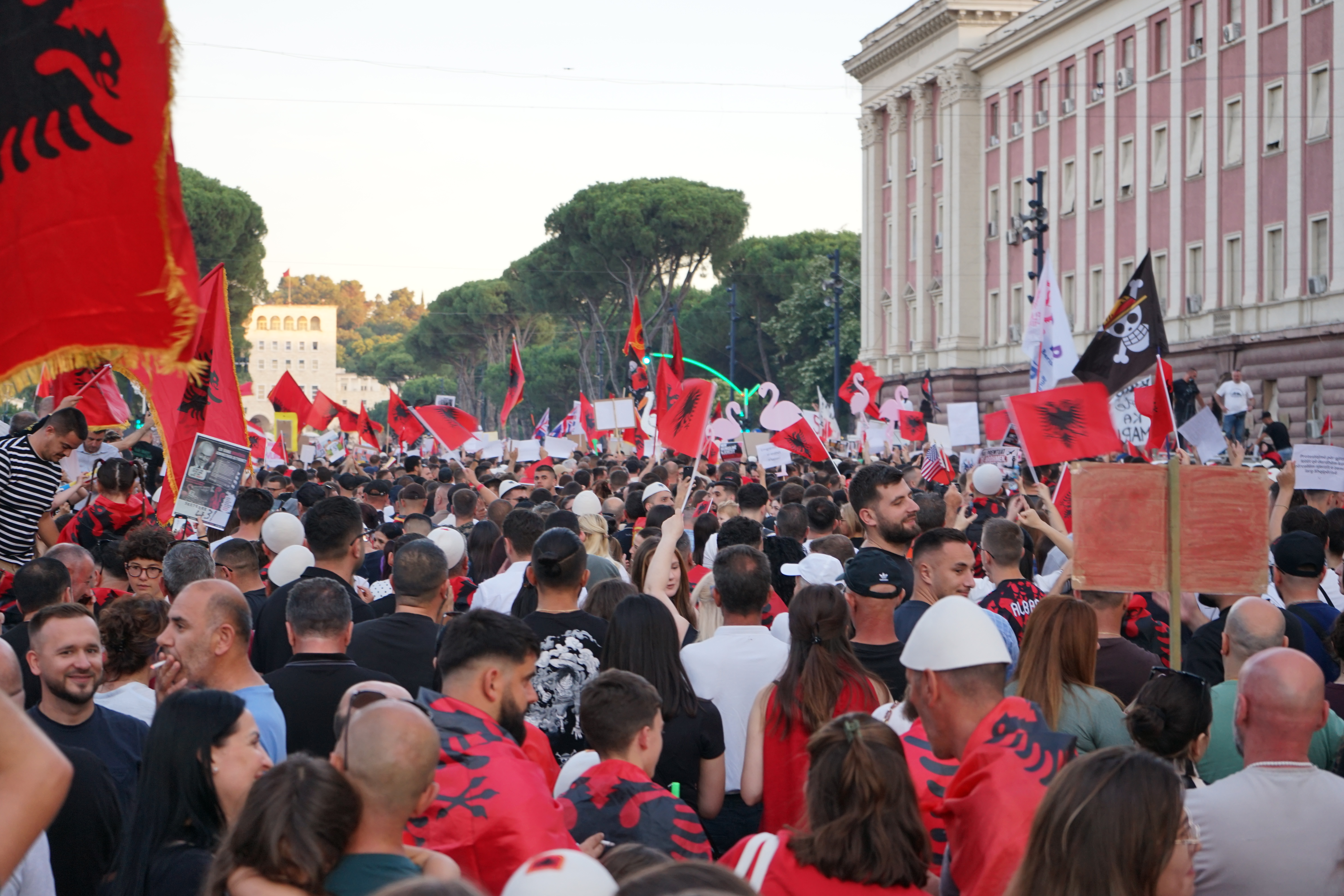
Protesters in Tirana on 13 June

On 14 June, protesters marched from Skanderbeg Square to the prime minister's office and later onto the Tirana–Durrës Highway, blocking the highway for several hours before heading toward the Rinas road and Tirana International Airport Nënë Tereza. Around 02:00 on 15 June, police units, including Shqiponjat and Rapid Intervention Forces (FNSH), stopped the march near the airport. Protesters sat on the Rinas road for about an hour and later returned toward Tirana, dispersing in the early morning.

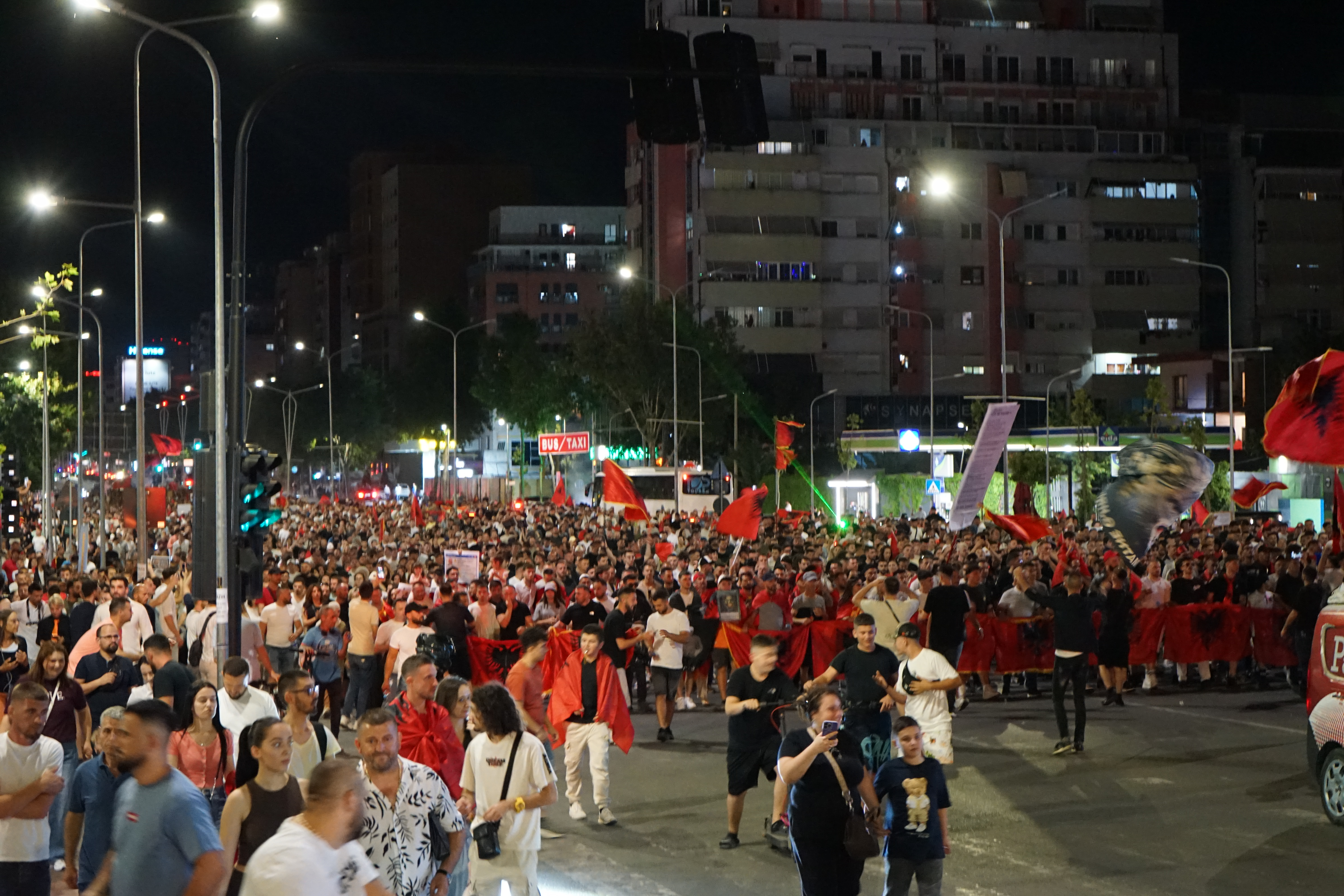
Protesters in Tirana on 14 June

Between 15 and 19 June, daily evening protests and marches continued in Tirana. Protesters repeatedly targeted both the government and the older opposition, while police later opened criminal proceedings against 19 people over the Rinas march and against 16 people after protesters entered the Fan Zone in Skanderbeg Square during World Cup broadcasts. On 18 June, protesters marched to the Parliament building during a plenary session, called on deputies to resign and confronted Socialist Party MP Ardit Bido, who was escorted away by police.

On 20 June, the protest became the largest demonstration of the movement to date. It was organized as a nationwide anti-government mobilization in Tirana, with participants arriving from across Albania and from the Albanian diaspora. The crowd filled much of Dëshmorët e Kombit Boulevard, while speakers presented the movement as a peaceful national civic revolt against corruption, state capture and the old political class. Albanian media estimates placed participation at more than 250,000 people.

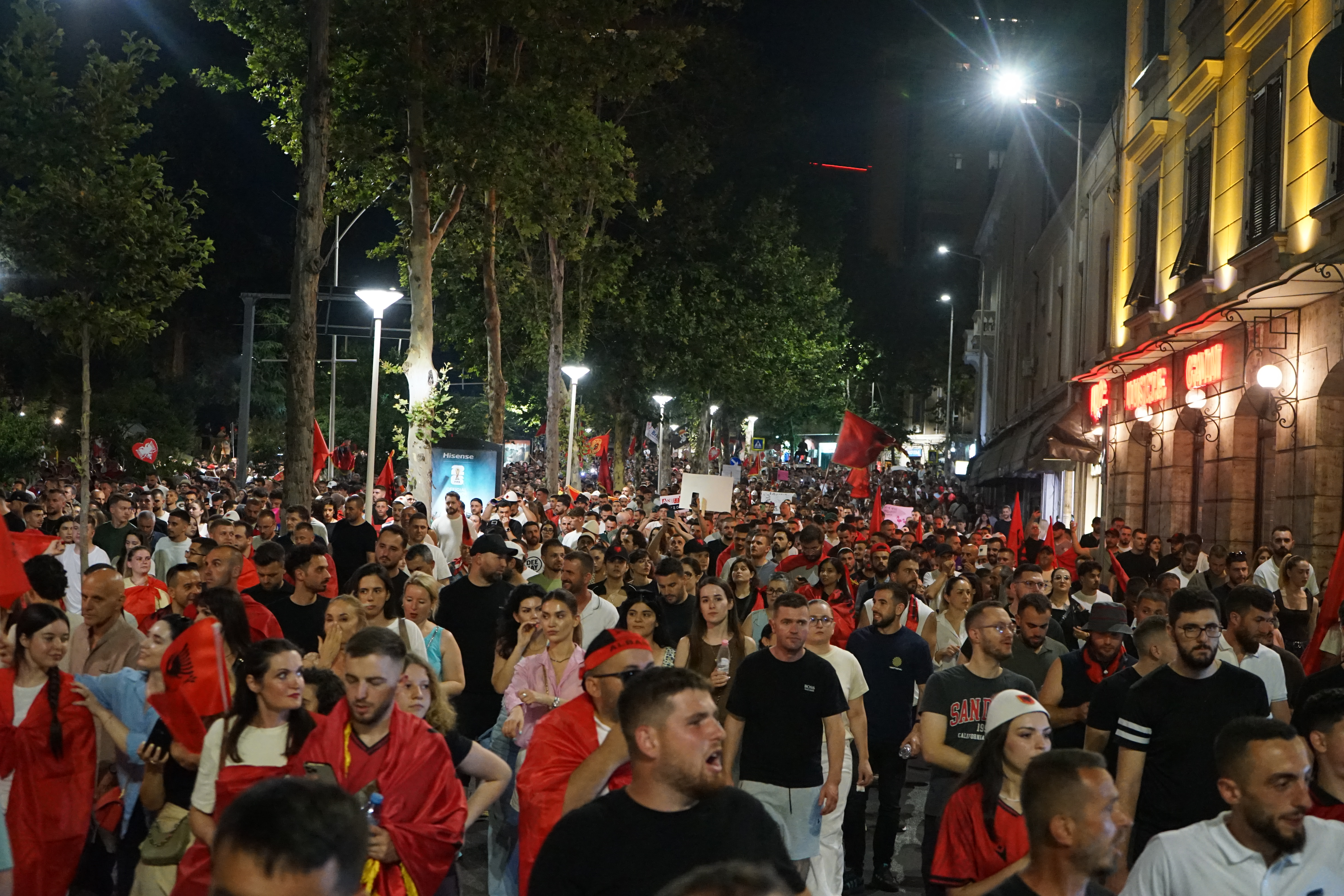
Protesters in Tirana on 21 June

The protest wave broadened to other civic and social issues from 21 to 23rd June. In Kakome, residents and emigrants protested over long-running property disputes and removed sections of fencing around disputed land; the protest was reported as peaceful. On 22 June, the protest coordinating group presented a five-point platform calling for Rama's resignation, a 12-month non-partisan technical government, constitutional and electoral reforms, term limits for the office of prime minister, repeal of disputed laws and development packages, and a new social contract. On 23 June, the Union of Trade Unions of Albania held a related protest in Tirana over wages, staffing levels, social dialogue, trade-union rights and the quality of public services.

On 25–26 June, protesters again read the five-point platform and sent an official letter to Western ambassadors and heads of mission accredited in Albania. The letter described the movement as peaceful and civic and asked diplomats to take the protesters' non-negotiable demands seriously. A small group of protesters also began spending the night near the prime minister's office, a practice that continued intermittently in the following days.

On 27 June, another nationwide Saturday gathering was held with significant diaspora participation. Italian MEP Ilaria Salis joined the protest and described the movement as an example of civic courage in Europe. On 28 June, the demonstrations entered their fifth week, and protesters announced a larger nationwide mobilization for 4 July.

On 29 June, the movement marked one month of daily demonstrations. Several European political representatives joined or addressed the rally, including MEPs Tineke Strik, Daniel Freund, Cristina Guarda, Jutta Paulus and Anna Strolenberg, while later coverage also reported speeches by Nicolae Ștefănuță, a vice-president of the European Parliament, and Vula Tsetsi, co-chair of the European Green Party. Their remarks focused on democracy, anti-corruption, environmental protection and Albania's European future.

On 30 June, protesters gathered outside the Parliament of Albania during a plenary session. Demonstrators accused the Parliament of failing to represent citizens and demanded the resignation of Rama and his government. The protest included symbolic actions against deputies and official vehicles, and tensions increased after eggs were thrown at Socialist officials and vehicles. Several protesters were escorted to police stations after physical confrontations with police. Opportunity Party leader Agron Shehaj and MP Erald Kapri went to the Tirana Police Directorate and later to police stations to seek information about those taken by police; according to Shehaj, six protesters had been escorted or detained. BalkanWeb later reported that the six had been released after several hours.

Later that evening, the regular protest resumed in Skanderbeg Square and outside the prime minister's office. Protesters again marched through Tirana, targeting both the government and the old opposition, and announced a gathering outside SPAK for the following day.

=== July 2026 ===
Throughout July, the regular demonstrations continued daily in Tirana, generally starting at Skanderbeg Square, proceeding to the prime minister's office and then through central streets.

On 1 July, protesters gathered outside SPAK and submitted material related to the book The Albanian Files, which they described as evidence of state capture, unlawful development in protected areas and conflicts of interest. Activist Sidorela Vatnikaj entered the building to submit the material, while lawyers connected to the protests said they were preparing a criminal complaint related to the issues raised by the publication. The regular evening protest continued in Tirana, where protesters again demanded Rama's resignation, as well as investigations into Rama and deputy prime minister Belinda Balluku.

On 2 July, protesters gathered outside the Parliament of Albania during a plenary session, in their most serious escalation up to that point. Police surrounded the Parliament area and deployed additional security measures, including an armoured vehicle and a water tanker, while protesters threw eggs and flour at Socialist Party deputies and vehicles and called on deputies to resign. The protest escalated after demonstrators attempted to remove part of the metal barrier and breached a police cordon. Police used tear gas, pepper spray and water cannon after protesters threw rocks, eggs, bottles and other objects.

After the clashes, 19 people received medical treatment, including 15 police officers and four protesters or citizens. More than 20 protesters were escorted or detained, while several lawyers alleged excessive force, irregular procedures and mistreatment in custody. Reports and videos also showed police entering a nearby café and removing several protesters, including activist Gent Progni, who later alleged from inside a cell that he had been beaten while handcuffed. Later that day, protesters gathered outside the prime minister's office and then marched to police station no. 3 on Mine Peza Street, demanding the release of detained protesters.

On 3 July, protesters gathered in Skanderbeg Square before moving toward the prime minister's office, police station no. 3 and the Tirana Prosecutor's Office, with Rama's resignation and the release of those detained after the 2 July clashes remaining central demands. Organizers presented the protest as a prelude to a larger nationwide mobilization announced for 4 July.

Protesters in Tirana on 4 July

On 4 July, a nationwide and diaspora mobilization was held in Tirana. Hundreds of thousands of people participated in the protest. Earlier in the day, heavy traffic and long queues were reported at border crossings, including at Morinë, where more than 11,000 citizens entered Albania within four hours. A Kosovo Border Management Center notice said queues had formed because Albanian authorities were registering people entering Albanian territory, while diaspora groups also entered through Muriqan and other crossings.

The 4 July protest began in Skanderbeg Square and continued along Dëshmorët e Kombit Boulevard toward the prime minister's office. Protesters carried national flags, placards and anti-government symbols, and continued demanding Rama's resignation, a technical government, investigations by SPAK and the release of protesters detained after the 2 July Parliament clashes. The protest also included symbolic actions tied to Rama's birthday, including a mock birthday cake and a symbolic coffin. A tall bust of Rama was also toppled with a rope, in an action that the Associated Press compared to the 1991 toppling of the statue of communist leader Enver Hoxha. After several hours outside the prime minister's office, protesters marched to police station no. 3 on Mine Peza Street. Tensions arose there after windows were broken at the building, and police used water to disperse the crowd.

On the same day, lawyer Gentian Serjani alleged that detained protester Niko Qarkaj had been beaten by police while being held in the security block near Mine Peza Street after suffering epileptic seizures. Serjani said Qarkaj had shown him bloodied clothes, had not received proper assistance during the seizures, and had been on a hunger strike since his detention. Qarkaj was later taken by ambulance from the security block to hospital, while his lawyer said the People's Advocate and the Albanian Helsinki Committee had been notified.

On 5 July, residents of Nikaj-Mërtur in Tropojë and environmental activists protested against a KESH project for the construction of three dams on the Mërtur River, arguing that the works lacked adequate consultation and threatened the area's natural and tourism value. The same day, the Tirana court reviewed security measures for 21 people detained after the 2 July Parliament clashes, placing two protesters, Everest Bardhi and Ervin Gega, under house arrest, ordering reporting obligations for 14 others and releasing five without a security measure.

During the same period, protesters also reacted to the government's decision to allocate 400 million lek (€4.2 million) from the state budget's reserve fund for a Kanye West concert near Tirana. The allocation was approved through a normative act on 6 July, using the constitutional procedure for urgent and necessary measures. Reuters reported that the decision added to public anger amid the protests, while Rama defended the funding as necessary to prevent the event's cancellation and argued that it would generate at least €100 million in revenue. At the 9 July protest, activists denounced the concert funding alongside police action over online reviews of businesses.

Opposition groups subsequently pursued legal challenges to the allocation. On 10 July, Lëvizja Shqipëria Bëhet submitted a request to the Constitutional Court seeking the annulment of the normative act. On 13 July, the parliamentary group of the Democratic Party filed a criminal complaint with SPAK against Rama and culture minister Blendi Gonxhja. The complaint alleged abuse of office and violation of equality in public procurement in connection with the allocation; the allegations had not been adjudicated.

On 11 July, another nationwide and diaspora mobilization was held in Tirana. Protesters gathered in Skanderbeg Square and marched toward the prime minister's office, while organizers said members of the Albanian diaspora would again join the demonstration. BalkanWeb reported that protesters continued to demand Rama's resignation and marched through several main streets of Tirana, with later drone footage showing tens of thousands of participants in the capital's streets.

On 13 July, lawyer and activist Altin Goxhaj also filed a criminal complaint with SPAK against State Police director Skënder Hita, alleging abuse of office and unlawful persecution in connection with police inquiries into negative online reviews of businesses; the allegations had not been adjudicated.

On 20 July, a protest was held outside the Parliament of Albania during a plenary sitting. Protesters gathered near the side and main entrances, where additional police units and metal barriers had been deployed, and repeated demands for Rama's resignation and investigations into Rama and Belinda Balluku. Some protesters carried eggs marked with the names of government officials and deputies and threw eggs at legislators' vehicles; MP Vangjel Dule was also targeted as he entered Parliament. A larger protest outside Parliament remained announced for 23 July, coinciding with the final plenary sitting before the summer recess.

On 21 July, residents of Prrenjas held a protest against a proposed territorial reform that they said would merge the municipality with Librazhd. Protesters argued that the change would weaken local self-government and the area's cultural and educational identity, and warned that demonstrations could escalate if the plan proceeded.

On 22 July, protesters gathered in Tirana. After speeches outside the prime minister's office, demonstrators marched through the city's main streets, repeated their demand for Rama's resignation and made a symbolic stop outside the Parliament of Albania. Protesters called for a further gathering outside Parliament on the morning of 23 July, during the final plenary sitting before the summer recess.

On 23 July, a protest was held outside the Parliament of Albania during the final plenary sitting before the summer recess. Protesters gathered around the approaches to the building, repeated demands for Rama's resignation and denounced Parliament as unrepresentative. Police deployed metal barriers, riot units and a water cannon. Tensions escalated when demonstrators rattled or attempted to cross the barriers and threw eggs and bottles toward police, lawmakers and official vehicles; police responded with water cannon, tear gas and pepper spray.

After the sitting ended, groups of protesters remained near Parliament and threw eggs at several ministers, Socialist Party deputies and official vehicles. Seventeen people received medical treatment at QSUT and the University Trauma Hospital, all of whom were reported to be outside life-threatening danger, while at least 11 people were taken to police stations. Despite the morning confrontation, the regular 19:00 demonstration proceeded as usual, beginning in Skanderbeg Square and continuing to the prime minister's office and through central Tirana.

From 24 to 26 July, the evening protests followed the movement's established route from Skanderbeg Square to the prime minister's office and through central Tirana, with demonstrators maintaining demands for Rama's resignation and broader political change. On 25 July, the march continued to police station no. 3, where protesters demanded the release of people detained following the 23 July Parliament protest. Organizers also announced a further demonstration outside Parliament on 27 July, a call repeated during the 26 July rally.

On 27 July, a protest began at 08:30 outside the Parliament of Albania during a plenary sitting. Police established a wider security perimeter, closed adjoining roads and positioned water-cannon vehicles near the building. Protesters moved between several approaches to Parliament and briefly blocked nearby streets before marching past the Ministry of Interior and along Elbasan Street and returning to the parliamentary area. Tensions arose when demonstrators attempted to cross a police cordon and threw eggs toward officers; police used pepper spray and detained five people, including coordinating-group member Arben Kola. One protester was taken to hospital after exposure to the spray. The demonstration later moved to police station no. 1 to demand the detainees' release; all five were subsequently released. When the sitting resumed in the afternoon, seven additional protesters were detained, and eggs were thrown at the vehicle of Socialist parliamentary-group leader Taulant Balla after he left the building.

On 30 July, residents of Poliçan protested against the Socialist Party's proposed territorial reform, which would remove Poliçan's status as a separate municipality. Demonstrators argued that the change would contribute to depopulation and demanded that the municipality be retained. Participants signed a petition and burned Socialist Party membership cards and a copy of the territorial-reform draft. Erion Zylyftari, the chair of the party's local branch, publicly announced his resignation during the protest, describing the proposal as unjust. The regular evening protest also continued in Tirana, where demonstrators marched through central streets, returned to Dëshmorët e Kombit Boulevard and repeated calls for Rama's resignation and criticism of the wider political class.

On 31 July, protests against the Socialist Party's proposed administrative-territorial map were held in Dimal, Divjakë, Klos and Prrenjas. In Dimal, residents gathered on the town's pedestrian street, opposed a proposed merger with Berat and signed a petition demanding the retention of separate municipal status, citing the municipality's population, agricultural economy, territorial extent and historical identity. Residents of Divjakë rejected a proposed merger with Lushnjë, while mayor Josif Gorrea said that he felt betrayed by the proposal. In Klos, residents opposed the municipality's proposed dissolution and merger with Mat, and municipal employees boycotted work for several hours; protesters also criticized the absence of broad public consultation. Residents of Prrenjas renewed their opposition to a proposed merger with Librazhd. The regular evening protest also continued in Tirana, beginning in Skanderbeg Square and proceeding to the prime minister's office before a march through central streets. Demonstrators maintained demands for Rama's resignation, a technical government and constitutional changes, while speakers expressed support for the municipalities opposing the territorial reform.

=== August 2026 ===
Protesters in Tirana on 1 August

Throughout August, the regular 19:00 demonstrations continued daily in Tirana on the same general route, with Rama's resignation remaining the principal demand.

On 3 August, residents and local-government representatives in Patos protested outside the municipal building against a proposal to dissolve the municipality and merge it with Fier. Demonstrators used the slogan "Hands off Patos", argued that the merger would weaken the city's identity and contribute to depopulation, and called for consultation with the local community before any change to its administrative status. Protesters also emphasized Patos's historical development around the oil industry. Mayor Fation Duro, a Socialist Party member, opposed the proposal, arguing that Patos ranked highly in the national Municipal Functionality Index and was the most efficient municipality in Fier County.

On 5 August, residents of Divjakë continued protesting against the proposed dissolution of the municipality under the government's territorial-reform plan. Demonstrators argued that a merger would reduce access to local services and adversely affect the area's economic and social life. They called for broader participation by residents and municipal employees, marched through the town and said that the demonstrations would continue until the proposal to dissolve the municipality was withdrawn.

On 7 August, residents of Memaliaj protested against a proposal to dissolve the municipality and merge it with Tepelenë. Demonstrators called for Memaliaj to retain its municipal status and local institutions, arguing that a merger would make public services less accessible, particularly for residents of outlying areas, and criticizing what they described as insufficient public consultation over the territorial reform. Protesters also emphasized the town's distinct identity and its historical association with mining, and said that demonstrations would continue against the proposed merger.

On 9 August, during the Tirana demonstration, a group of protesters marched from Dëshmorët e Kombit Boulevard to the nearby embassies of Serbia and Ukraine. The action followed Ukrainian president Volodymyr Zelenskyy's visit to Belgrade, where, alongside Serbian president Aleksandar Vučić, he reiterated Ukraine's non-recognition of Kosovo and stated that Kyiv's position on Kosovo's 2008 declaration of independence remained unchanged, while emphasizing respect for Serbia's territorial integrity. The remarks drew criticism in Kosovo, whose institutions had condemned Russia's full-scale invasion in 2022, declared support for Ukraine's sovereignty, and aligned with sanctions against Russia. Serbia, while condemning the invasion and supporting Ukraine's territorial integrity, had continued to refuse sanctions against Russia and maintained longstanding political and economic ties with Moscow. Protesters symbolically referred to the street as "Free Dardania" instead of the official "Free Ukraine", and chanted in support of the Kosovo Liberation Army.

On 10 August, residents of Mirakë, in Librazhd Municipality, protested over access restrictions they attributed to construction work on Corridor VIII. Residents said that road works had left seven villages in Librazhd Municipality and two in Elbasan Municipality with access only in the Elbasan–Librazhd direction, while the suspension of intercity transport services had further limited mobility for people without private vehicles. Protesters called for an immediate solution to restore access. The same day, residents of Orikum gathered outside the local administrative centre, calling for Orikum to be restored as a separate municipality rather than remain part of Vlorë Municipality. They also opposed the proposed new administrative-territorial reform and called for the views of the local community to be taken into account.

On 19 August, residents of Patos held a second protest against the proposed merger with Fier, warning that the change could reduce local services and lead to the closure or downsizing of municipal institutions.

=== September 2026 ===
Throughout September, daily protests and the nighttime 19:00 demonstrations in Tirana continue, with Rama’s resignation as the main demand. Around 7-8 September, the daily protests in Tirana reached the 100th day. Many protesters were detained due to violence against the police.

=== October 2026: Beginning of student protests ===
2026 Albanian student protests
- Protests in Tirana on 18 and 22 October 2026
- Date: 13 October 2026 – present (1 month and 9 days)
- Location: Albania, mostly in Tirana
- Caused by: Government corruption allegations; Unemployment; Living costs; Low quality of education; Concerns over election fraud
- Goals: Five demands: Resignation of Edi Rama and his government; Crackdown on corruption; Better education quality; Lower cost of living
- Methods: Demonstrations, boycotts, riots, arson, vandalism, chants
- Status: Ongoing

Parties
(Albania) Student protesters Supported by: Opportunity Party; Lëvizja Bashkë; Lëvizja Shqipëria Bëhet; Albanian Royal Court; Other minor parties	Government of Albania; Socialist Party of Albania; State Police; Shqiponjat; FNSH; RENEA (on 17 October 2026)

Lead figures
Decentralized Leadership	(Albania) Edi Rama Skënder Hita; (Albania) Taulant Balla

Casualties and losses
1,067 protestors arrested	200+ (WIA)

Student-led demonstrations in Albania escalated into violent clashes between protesters and police, beginning on 13 October 2026, when demonstrators gathered outside the Ministry of Education and threw stones and other objects at the building and police. Police forces responded with tear gas, rubber pellets and water cannons, while protesters also damaged other public and private property.

Prime Minister Edi Rama claimed that foreign actors were behind the protests, trying to prevent Albania’s membership in the EU.

==== 13 October ====
On 13 October 2026, a wave of student protests began in Albania. Protesters gathered in front of the Ministry of Education building in Tirana around 14:00, and the situation escalated when some protesters lit fires across the area. Police forces began to disperse the protesters, who returned to the protesting areas about an hour later. More tensions and clashes are reported, with the building being severely damaged. Many protesters stormed the Tirana Municipality building and Pazari i Ri areas, setting them on fire and clashing with the police forces.

==== 14 October ====
The Ministry of Interior and the Ministry of Finance were attacked and so was the prime minister's office. The Shqiponjat unit managed to disperse the crowd but other businesses were also burned.

About a thousand protestors set fire to a government building and at least two banks. Demonstrators chanted “resignation” and “police of crime”. Deputy Minister Albana Kociu have condemned the riots on Facebook.

==== 15 October ====
Edi Rama rejected calls to resign as protestors continued to clash with the police. Rama says that he is willing to talk about rising education costs but is unwilling to resign.

==== 16 October ====
On 16 October, the riots in Tirana became increasingly violent, and thousands faced off the police near the Ministry of Education. In the town of Lezhë, protestors threw stones at the police. Riots have also spread to other cities like Elbasan, Shkodër, and Korçë.

==== 17 October ====
Protesters swarmed Dëshmorët e Kombit Boulevard, forcing police units to defend the prime minister’s office with tear gas, water cannons and other equipment. In the evening, the situation escalated, with protesters burning key buildings in the Myslym Shyri area. RENEA forces were dispatched to counter the protesters.

Police forces in Tirana responded to the protestors by firing rubber bullets. Albania’s police chief Skender Hita has denied using them. 7 police officers have reportedly been suspended following the incident. Reports say at least 1,067 people have been arrested, with 388 being criminally prosecuted.

==== 18 October ====
Burning building set up on fire during the protest on 18 October.

The protests continued with protesters hurling cylinder shaped decor at police units. Figures say that around 295 people were injured, with 186 of them being police officers. Protesters in Rinia Park have loosened the park’s stones to use as ammunition against the police.

Edi Rama said that Albania has become one of the targets of a well-coordinated attack as response to the protests.

==== 19 October ====
Demonstrators used lasers and fireworks to counter the police. Police hid behind anti-riot vehicles.

Violent protests continued with protesters clashing with police forces. Protesters used fireworks and lasers against the police and blocked roads with burning dumpsters to slow them. Police marched behind anti-riot vehicles, shooting protesters with rubber bullets and water cannons.

==== 20 October ====
Edi Rama set up chairs outside the Prime Minister's Office labelled "dialogue". They symbolised that Edi Rama and his government were open for talks with the demonstrators. These chairs, were eventually destroyed by protesters in the following hours.

Police fired tear gas and used water cannons to disperse the protests during the day.

The Union of University Workers of Albania (SPUSH) held a solidarity march from the Polytechnic University of Tirana to the Prime Minister's Office in support of the protesting students. It also unanimously announced an indefinite teaching boycott at all public universities nationwide, beginning on 21 October.

==== 21 October ====
Boycotting of schools and universities took place, beginning on 21 October. The boycott would happen from 10:00 every day in front of the Central buildin of the Polytechnic University in Tirana.

Protesters continued clashes with the police throughout the day. They had helmets on to block blunt force weapons from the police.

==== 22 October ====
Minor sporadic protests took place on 22 October. The students and demonstrators made calls for nationwide protests to be held on Saturday, 24 October.

==== 23 October ====
Barricaded glass at the Ministry of Education during the protests.

Demonstrations continued throughout the day. 2 education unions stated their support for the demonstrators, and said that they would be joining the demonstrations on 24 October, the same day as the nationwide protests.

==== 24 October ====
On 24 October, nationwide protests took place. Around 2,000 police officers were deployed in response of the protests.

At approximately 14:00 demonstrators gathered in front of the Ministry of Education, and soon flooded the streets, but were swiftly dispersed by the police, causing them to split into groups. The demonstrators regrouped and around 17:00, the police force and the protesters clashed in Skanderbeg Square. Police used tear gas, rubber pellets and water cannons to deter the protesters. Demonstrators used fireworks and other makeshift weapons.

28-year-old Erjon Vishkulli, a member of the Tifozat Kuq e Zi fan group, was struck in the eye with a rubber bullet. Graphic videos of the aftermath surfaced online. He was rushed to hospital and had a surgery later that day, which ended up with his eye being removed.

==== 25 October ====
The Albanian government announced that it would be imposing fines of 500,000 lek (approximately $6,200 dollars) on demonstrators committing acts of violence, vandalism, looting and arson. Other penalties were also announced, including travel restrictions and detention of up to 72 hours.

By 16:00, the demonstrators were at the prime minister's building and many protesters set fire to chairs around the building that had been placed there by Edi Rama as a means of negotiating with the demonstrators.

==== 26 October ====
The clashes between protesters and police forces continued. Participants claimed that they would not back down until their demands were met. The student protesters clashed with the police in Tirana, who retaliated using rubber pellets and water cannons to disperse the protesters. The organizers called for a large protest at 14:00 in front of the Ministry of Education building. Rama defended the police forces and criticized the media for "glorifying" the protests.

==== 27 October ====
Protesters gathered around the Ministry of Education building. University teachers were reported at the protests, and demonstrators still refused to begin talks with the PM.

Police found around 1,900 fireworks that had been smuggled in and sold to protesters. The fireworks were confiscated, and a 51-year-old man who had sold them was arrested. He did not have a licence to sell them or documentation for their purchase.

==== 28-31 October ====
On 28 October, the government approved new legal measures aiming to contain the protest, giving more authority to the Police for intervening in gatherings and against individuals identifies as involved in acts of violence. The measures consisted of a government act amending the law on Assemblies, creating a special electronic registry for persons referred or under investigation for violence during public demonstrations.

Protests continued throughout 28 and 29 October. Demonstrators marched to several government institutions, condemning the PM and boycotting classes.

Loosened tiles on the road after protests.

On 31 October, the 19th consecutive day of protests, rallies were held in front of the ministry of education building while a demonstration organized by Democratic Party of Albania was ongoing at the same time. The rallies would escalate when demonstrators clashed with the police with Molotov cocktails, other pyrotechnics and stones. The police would respond with water cannon and tear gas to disperse the crowds.

=== November 2026: Continuation of the student protests ===
Since November 2026, student protests were still ongoing and had lasted for 28 days.

On 2 November, protests happened in the Polytechnic University of Tirana following students gathering and demonstrating in the Faculty of History and Philology, entering in lecture halls and urging students to boycott the classes. Many faculties within the universities were affected by the protests.

Albanian forces have fined 16 protesters 5,000 lek following demonstrations in Dëshmorët e Kombit Boulevard in Tirana on 2 November.

From 3 November, protests happened outside of the prime minister's office, with police forces being deployed on 4 November using tear gas to disperse the protesters. Albanian police have fined 31 protesters from the 4 November demonstrations, totalling to 83 fined protesters since October 2026.

On 7 November, protests started at 14:00, at the Ministry of Education. Demonstrators threw molotov cocktails and moved dumpsters using them as defence against water cannons. They also chanted slogans such as "Down with communism" and spray painted them in multiple places. 12 people were detained and 10 were fined following the protests.

On 8 November, intense confrontations between demonstrators and police forces continued, with 37 individuals being fined for obstructing traffic. These obstructions happened at Dëshmorët e Kombit Boulevard, and despite calls from police via loudspeakers, demonstrators continued to create chaos for traffic in the area.

On 21 November, it was reported that activist Greta Thunberg has joined in the protests in Albania.

== International protests ==
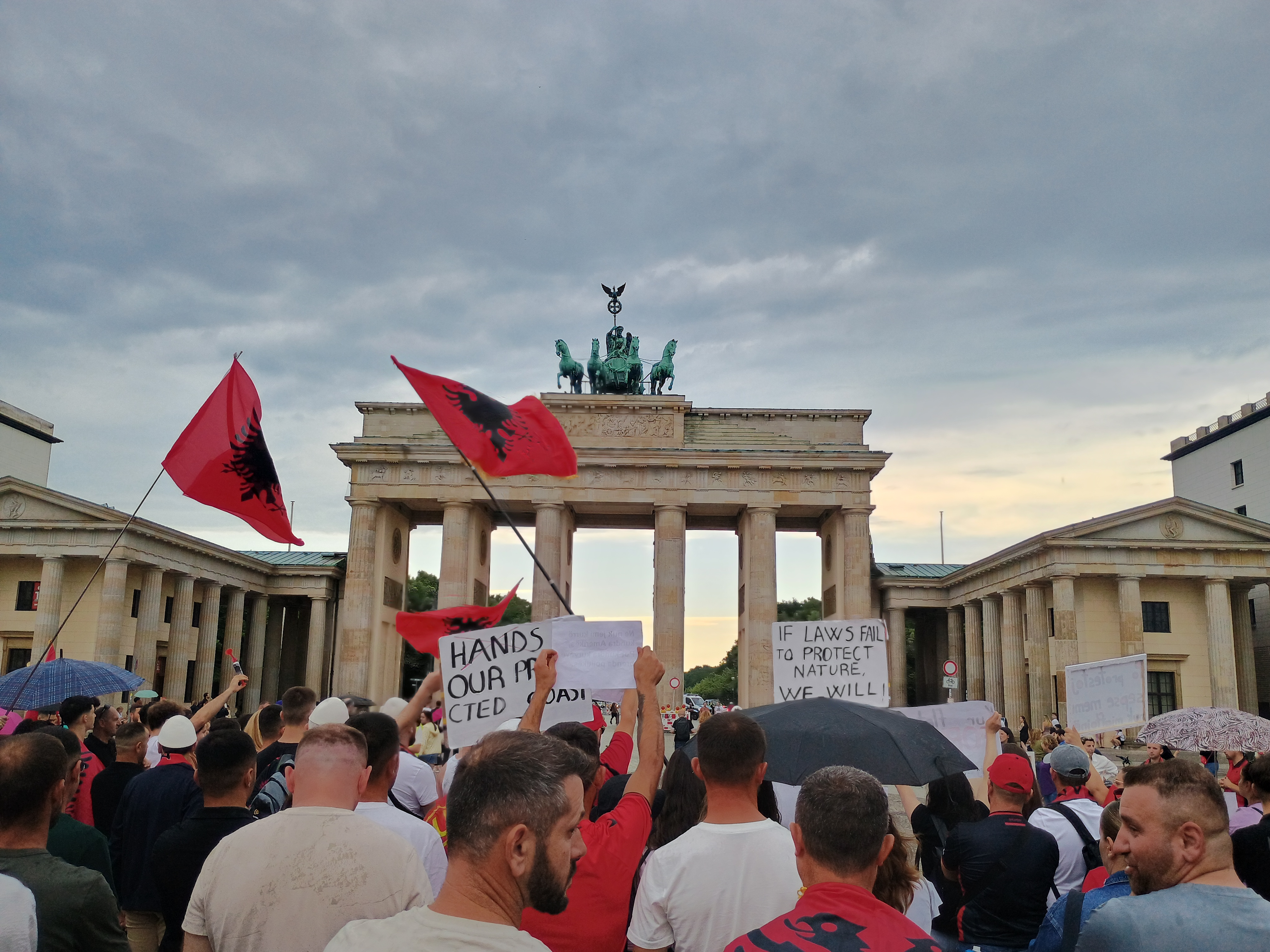
Rally by the Albanian diaspora in Berlin on 21 June

Several solidarity rallies were announced and later held among Albanian diaspora communities in Europe, North America and Australia, while additional protest calls circulated for other cities. Early international rallies and protest calls included Berlin, Munich and Stockholm on 5 June; London, Milan, Florence, New York City, Washington, D.C., and Toronto on 6 June; Brussels, Bologna and Skopje on 7 June; and a further New York gathering announced for 15 June.

On 7 June, diaspora protests were also held in several cities including London, Brussels, Hamburg, Milan, New York City and Bern, with participants opposing the government's handling of the planned developments and calling for greater transparency and accountability. Further simultaneous rallies were planned for 14 June in 17 cities across Europe and North America, including New York City, Chicago, Boston, Michigan, Toronto, Berlin, Munich, Cologne, Stuttgart, Athens, Genoa, Faenza, The Hague, Strasbourg, Vienna, Oslo, and Odense.

A civic movement involving a coordinated road trip of Albanian expatriates travelling from London to Tirana to join national protests occurred in June. Although the journey lasted a few days, the goal was to be in Tirana for the organized protests on 20 June. The convoy began voyaging with 45 automobiles from London. Later on, more automobiles joined the motorcade from Belgium, Germany, Austria, Hungary and other European countries, and then entered Albanian territory near Shkodër. After arriving in Tirana, the motorcade arrived in Laprakë, and then its participants marched on foot to the Prime Minister's office.

=== Europe ===
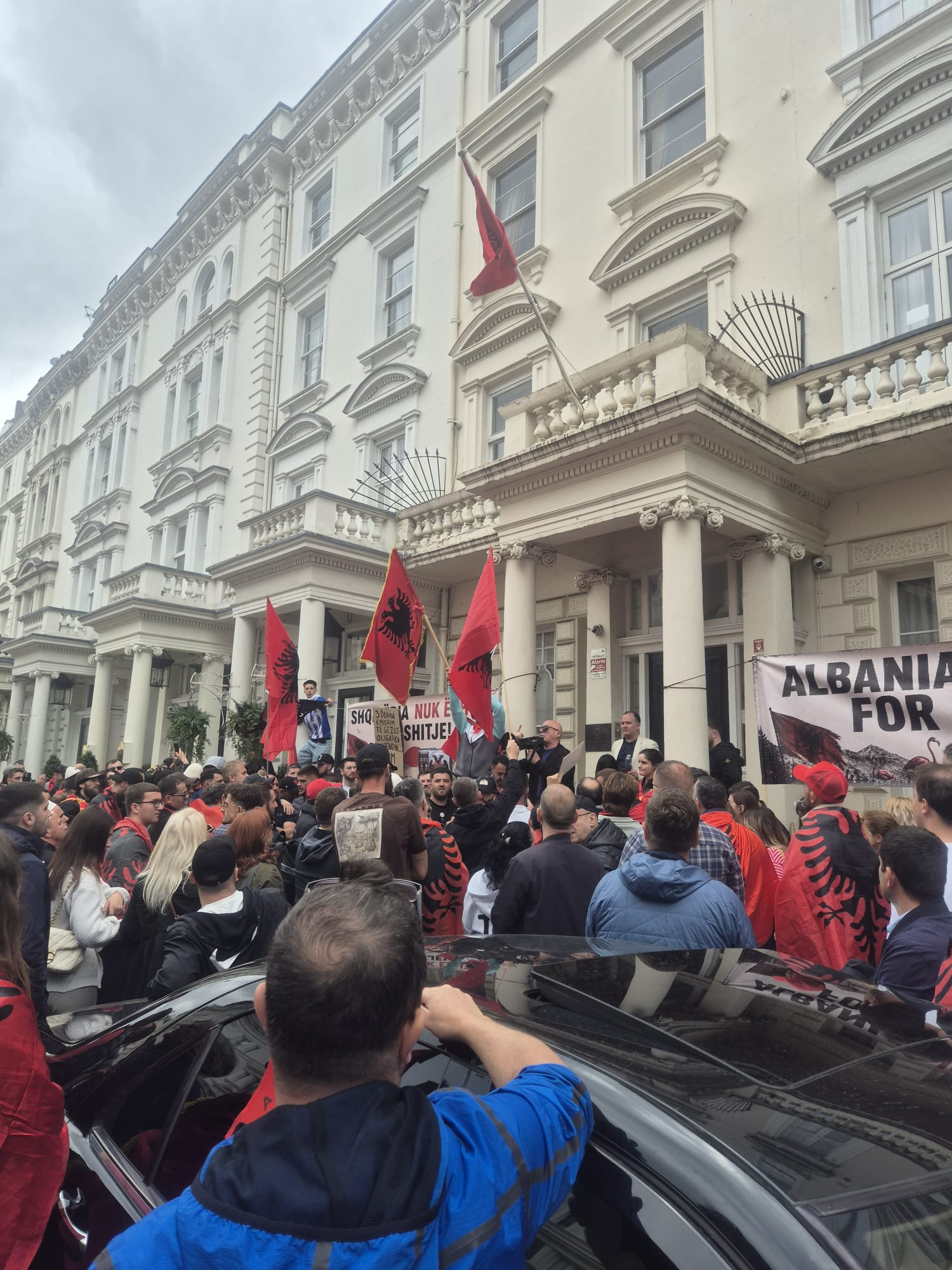
Albanian protesters outside of the Albanian embassy in London, 7 June 2026

On 6 June, Albanians in Vienna held a protest against the Albanian government, carrying placards such as "Albania is not for sale" and chanting for Rama to resign. On 7 June, people gathered near the headquarters of the European Union in Brussels in support of the protests in Albania, carrying Albanian flags and placards calling for environmental protection and transparency over the planned development. On 8 June, during a protest organized by Andrey Ralev in Sofia, demonstrators called upon the European Union to act immediately and side with the protesters in Albania. On 13 June, Albanians gathered in Lyon with flags and flamingo symbols in support of the protests in Albania.

On 5 June, several hundred demonstrators gathered near the Embassy of Albania in Berlin to protest against the project, while also raising concerns about pensions, working conditions, education, and government policies affecting young people. On the same day, another rally was held near the Albanian Consulate in Munich, with the call "For nature, for justice, for Albania". On 7 June, diaspora protests were also held in Hamburg, Stuttgart and Heidelberg. On 13 June, dozens of Albanians gathered in Nuremberg as part of the diaspora protests. On 14 June, Albanians held another protest in Munich alongside the demonstrations in Tirana, chanting "Rama in prison, Berisha in prison". On the same day, several hundred people participated in a demonstration in Cologne.

On 16 June, Rama was confronted by Albanian protesters in Berlin during his visit to the Annual Conference of the Eastern Committee. As he left the event, protesters chanted slogans including "Edi Rama, traitor, resign as soon as possible", "Shame", "Cancel the project" and "Cancel the law"; Rama waved at the protesters before entering his car.

On 1 July, Rama was again met by Albanian diaspora protesters in Germany, this time in Düsseldorf, where he had travelled for a meeting with Hendrik Wüst, the Minister-President of North Rhine-Westphalia. A group of Albanian protesters carrying national symbols gathered at the start of the meeting and called for Rama's resignation. BalkanWeb reported that the protesters also raised placards and slogans against laws which, according to them, favoured the privatization of public assets, linking the Düsseldorf protest with the wider demonstrations taking place in Tirana.

On 6 June, Albanian migrants and solidarity activists demonstrated in Syntagma Square, Athens, opposing the planned tourism development near the protected Vjosa–Narta wetlands and the Zvërnec coastline. Participants carried banners and flamingo symbols associated with the movement. On 13 June, people gathered in Dublin to protest against Rama's government and demand his resignation.

On 6 June, around 2,000 people gathered in Milan to join the protests, holding signs, singing national songs and shouting slogans against the Albanian government. On the same day, 450 people gathered in Florence for a similar protest. On 7 June, hundreds of Albanians gathered in Bologna, chanting slogans against Edi Rama and opposing the planned resort project. On 14 June, diaspora rallies continued in Italy. Genoa and Faenza were listed among the planned 14 June gatherings, while protests were also held in Rome and Pisa, where participants carried Albanian flags and placards and called for the resignation of the Albanian government.

On 4 June, activists and citizens gathered outside the Embassy of Albania in Pristina in solidarity with the protests in Albania. They opposed planned interventions in protected natural areas and criticized what they described as the privatization of public spaces. On 7 June, Albanians protested in The Hague against the Albanian government and the planned development in Zvërnec, using slogans including "Albania is not for sale". On 7 June, a solidarity protest was listed in Skopje, at Macedonia Square, as part of the international protest calendar connected with the movement.

On 5 June, protests were held in Stockholm with the call "Save Vjosa-Narta". On 13 June, the Albanian diaspora in Stockholm again protested, chanting "Rama resign" and "Rama in prison" and accusing the Albanian government of selling the country. On 7 June, people gathered in Bern as part of wider diaspora protests held in several European and North American cities. On 13 June, another protest was held outside the Embassy of Albania in Bern, with participants calling for Rama's resignation.

On 6 June, members of the Albanian diaspora gathered outside the Embassy of Albania in London to protest against the planned resort development and call for Rama's resignation. The protest continued the following day, when Albanians living in the United Kingdom gathered again outside the embassy with national flags and placards calling for environmental protection, transparency and Rama's resignation. On 13 June, Albanians in London again gathered with flamingo symbols and Albanian flags as part of the wider diaspora mobilization.

On Saturday, 3 October, many Albanian diaspora protested in Brussels, Belgium, from 16:00 to 19:00, outside the Europe Commission headquarters in Robert Schuman Roundabout.

In Frankfurt, Germany, demonstrations by the Albanian diaspora occurred following visits from Edi Rama's visit to Germany, on 3 November.

=== North America ===
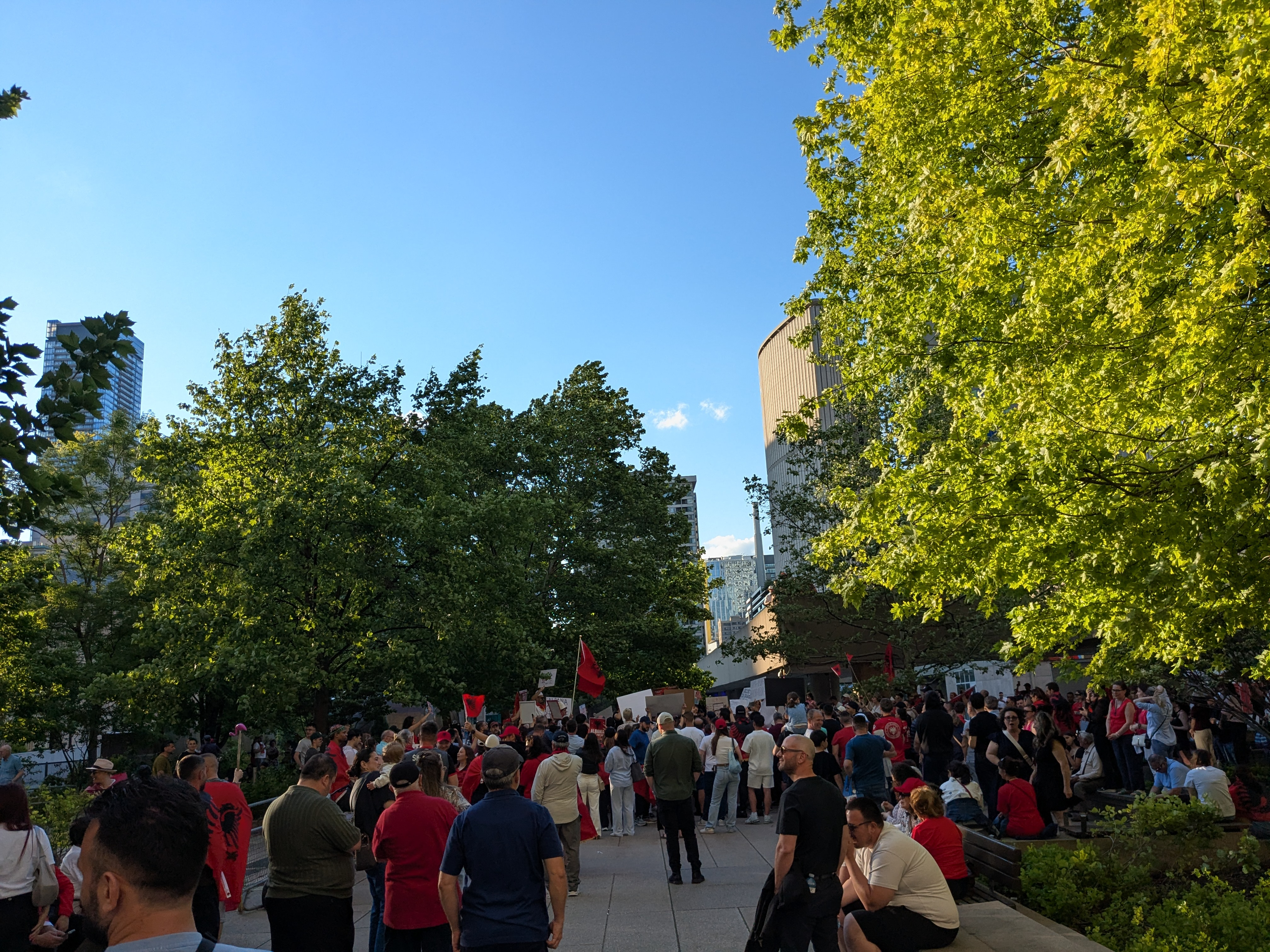
Rally by the Albanian diaspora in Toronto on 6 June

On 6 June, people in Toronto took part in the protests, wearing red and black clothing and carrying Albanian flags while calling for Prime Minister Edi Rama to resign. Toronto was also listed among the cities where further diaspora rallies were planned for 14 June.

On 6 June, an estimated 1,500 to 2,000 people gathered outside the Albanian Consulate in New York City in support of protecting the Vjosa-Narta wetlands and opposing the planned resort project. A second New York gathering was planned for 14 June. On the same day, members of the Albanian diaspora also gathered outside the Albanian Embassy in Washington, D.C., calling for the resignation of Rama and the government. On 28 June, a large protest predominantly comprising members of the Albanian diaspora took place in Waterbury, Connecticut.

On 12 July, Albanian Americans from several states gathered outside the United Nations headquarters in New York in support of the forty-third consecutive protest in Albania. The demonstrators repeated the movement's demands for the repeal of disputed laws, political and electoral reforms, a non-partisan transitional government and Rama's resignation.

=== Oceania ===
On 13 June, people gathered in Melbourne in support of the protests in Albania, calling for the resignation of Prime Minister Edi Rama and a change in government.

== Reactions ==
=== Government ===
==== Edi Rama ====
Prime Minister Edi Rama defended the planned development and rejected allegations that public property had been unlawfully transferred, saying that the land included in the project had been legally acquired by private owners. On 2 June, he rejected calls to cancel the project, telling SeeNews that there was "no chance" the investment would stop while he remained in office and presenting it as a major foreign investment for Albania's tourism sector. The Associated Press also quoted Rama as saying that Albania should not fear a project involving partners investing €4 billion.

Rama initially sought to minimize the size and significance of the demonstrations, saying that participation was far lower than reported and accusing international media and social networks of creating a "digital hysteria" around the issue. He also suggested that foreign media and outside interests were amplifying or exploiting the protests. In interviews and public statements, Rama described the demonstrations as part of a "hybrid war" used by enemies of Albania and Israel, specifically citing Iran, while Albanian media and commentators reported a sequence of official or pro-government narratives linking the protests to foreign actors including Greek, Serbian, Russian and Iranian interests. Esmail Baghaei, spokesperson for the Iranian Ministry of Foreign Affairs, denied the accusation, calling it a "laughable accusation" and a way to deflect public demands.

Rama's rhetoric toward the movement became increasingly confrontational as the protests continued. He described some participants as "ignorant", "delusional" and lacking logic, and later accused parts of the protest movement of online bullying, intimidation and a "fascist spirit" against those who did not join or support the demonstrations. He also argued that the protests were harming tourism and local economies and framed the movement as partly driven by social-media algorithms, describing the protest square as a "studio" used to produce content and "feed the algorithm".

In a 16 June interview with Vanity Fair Italia, Rama said that the transaction for the Zvërnec coastal site had been suspended until the lawful ownership of the land was clarified. He argued that criticism of the project was based on "half-truths", said that Sazan Island was not being sold but considered for a partnership, and stated that no final concrete project had yet been completed. In a 23 June interview with the Financial Times, he rejected accusations that he was a "Godfather" figure in Albania, defended the Kushner-linked investments as legitimate, denied that they were connected to money laundering, and said that coastal development plans would continue despite the protests.

Rama also personally attacked several figures associated with the movement. After former Kosovo Liberation Army fighter Dritan Goxhaj read the protest coordinating group's five-point platform, Rama described him as a "spokesman for Iranian interests" and later as a "half-Taliban, half-mythomaniac manipulator". Lapsi.al later described the response to Goxhaj as a broader effort by the governing camp to delegitimize the protest by shifting attention from its demands to the biography and views of the person who had read them publicly.

After the 2 July clashes outside Parliament, Rama said that everyone had the right to contest government decisions, but that "in a democracy the monopoly of force belongs to the state, not the individual". He distinguished between what he called peaceful "flamingos" and violent "crows and ravens", and referred to some protest participants as "paid servants" and "mercenaries" from Pristina and Tetova. In a later post, he wrote that what he called a "beautiful protest of citizenship, patriotism and purity" had given way to an old pattern of conflict, quarrels and violence.

In October 2026, following a resurgence of protests, Edi Rama set up chairs out of the government buildings with the inscription “Dialogue” as a means to negotiate with the demonstrators. It was destroyed shortly after by the protests.

==== Other Socialist Party and government figures ====
Political AI-generated video by Taulant Balla mocking the stance of the Democratic Party and Sali Berisha on the protests

Socialist Party parliamentary leader Taulant Balla accused Sali Berisha and the Democratic Party of opportunism, saying that they had changed position on the project only after the protests gained momentum. He also shared an AI-generated video of an owl turning into a flamingo, which he used as a metaphor for what he described as the opposition's attempt to appropriate the protests. Reporter.al later described a false claim that the investment was being relocated to Mykonos as political disinformation used to undermine the protests, and mentioned both Ardit Bido and Balla in connection with misleading narratives about the demonstrations.

Balla's rhetoric sharpened after the late-June and early-July confrontations. On 30 June, he described activist Gentjan Progni as a repeated lawbreaker and said a "criminal and terrorist gang" was using the protest for its own interests. After the 2 July clashes outside Parliament, he said the Socialist majority would not retreat because of what he called "social and political waste", while also distinguishing between "real protesters" and people he accused of violence.

Other Socialist figures adopted more nuanced positions. MP Erion Braçe said that the protests included genuine citizens, including some Socialists, and that the government should listen to their concerns. At the same time, he defended the Zvërnec project as an economic opportunity and argued that environmental, property and development interests should be balanced. Former Europe and foreign minister Elisa Spiropali called for a "new agreement for Albania" based on stronger institutions, democratic opposition, media freedom, accountability and limits on political power. On 16 July, she submitted a motion to the Socialist Party General Assembly seeking an internal debate on the proposal. The motion called for greater internal party democracy, a clearer separation between the state and party politics, and a public administration serving citizens rather than individual officeholders. Spiropali argued that civic mobilisation should not be treated as a threat or suppressed, but as an opportunity for reflection and institutional response, and said that the party should answer citizens with humility rather than arrogance.

==== Socialist Party dissenters and former officials ====
Several former Socialist officials publicly criticized Rama's response to the protests. Former foreign minister Arta Dade rejected an invitation to a Socialist Party anniversary event and a symbolic award from Rama, describing the gathering as a staged "anti-rally" and expressing support for young people protesting for dignity and social rights. Former socialist minister Ermelinda Meksi said that Rama focused on counting and downplaying protesters rather than addressing their concerns over transparency, corruption and consultation. Former foreign minister Ditmir Bushati described the demonstrations as "protests of dignity", warned that accusing protesters of serving foreign agendas was dangerous, and linked the movement to concerns about concentration of power and democratic accountability.

Marjana Koçeku, elected in 2025 from the Socialist Party's closed list in Shkodër, left the party's parliamentary group and announced that she would continue as an independent MP. She subsequently aligned herself with the protests, published an open letter calling on Rama to resign, and said the demonstrations reflected a deeper crisis of trust between citizens and political institutions. On 30 June, Koçeku said she was in the European Parliament at the invitation of several MEPs to discuss the protests, environmental issues, corruption and what she described as arbitrary government power. Former finance minister Arben Malaj also said that the protests reflected deeper governance problems and argued that Rama's resignation had become a realistic political outcome.

=== Democratic Party ===
The Democratic Party of Albania (PD), Albania's largest opposition party, had an initially cautious and contested position toward the protests. In the early days of the movement, demonstrators criticized both Rama and PD leader Sali Berisha, reflecting a wider anti-establishment mood and distrust of the old political class. On 1 June, Berisha condemned violence against protesters in Zvërnec while also stating that PD supported foreign investment and was not seeking to drive investors away from Albania.

As the demonstrations continued, Berisha moved toward more explicit support. By 7 June, Berisha "changed his mind" from conditional support for investment and demands for transparency to full support for protesters opposing the project. On 10 June, he instructed PD supporters to join the demonstrations without party symbols, saying that the movement was civic and youth-led and that the party had also sought support for the protests from the European People's Party.

The party's growing support remained controversial because the protest movement presented itself as civic and non-partisan. On 8 June, tensions occurred when members of the Youth Forum of the Democratic Party of Albania attempted to join the protest and some demonstrators accused party activists of trying to divide or appropriate the movement. In parliamentary debates, PD representatives increasingly defended the protesters' demands, including Rama's resignation, while government figures used the party's change of position to accuse Berisha and the opposition of opportunism.

On 7 July 2026, in an interview with Truth Times, opposition leader Sali Berisha described the demonstrations as "the most important movement of the last 35 years", comparing them to the movement that overthrew Albania's communist regime in the early 1990s. He said PD supported the protests but would not seek to lead them, called for Prime Minister Edi Rama's resignation and the formation of a non-partisan caretaker government, rejected the government's claims of foreign involvement in the demonstrations, and alleged that authorities had attempted to portray the protests as antisemitic while insisting the movement was "not, and is not, antisemitic".

PD also used a parliamentary boycott in support of the protesters' demands. On 18 June, its deputies boycotted the vote on a penal-amnesty bill after arguing that the protesters' demands should take precedence on Parliament's agenda. From 13 July, the parliamentary group began a broader boycott of plenary sittings, while continuing to participate in parliamentary committees. Berisha said the boycott would remain in place until amendments submitted by PD deputies in support of the protesters' five demands were brought before Parliament. The decision was contested within the party: MPs Jorida Tabaku, Ina Zhupa and Bujar Leskaj argued that absence from plenary sittings deprived the opposition and the protesters of an important public platform.

=== Minor opposition parties ===
The Opportunity Party was the largest minor opposition party represented in Parliament during the protests, with two MPs, Agron Shehaj and Erald Kapri, following the 2025 parliamentary election. The party supported the protest movement, with Shehaj publicly acknowledging its involvement in protests over tourism developments and property disputes from Theth to Nartë, including Zvërnec. Its representatives were also active in the related Rrjoll property and resort dispute, which became connected to the wider protest narrative over coastal development, private interests and property rights. During the Tirana phase of the protests, Shehaj and Kapri followed the situation of detained protesters, requested information from police authorities after the Parliament clashes and visited protesters held at police stations.

Both Opportunity Party MPs were also subjected to disciplinary exclusion from parliamentary proceedings during the protest period. On 18 June, Parliament speaker Niko Peleshi ordered Shehaj removed from the sitting after he repeatedly called on Rama to resign during the vote on the penal-amnesty bill. On 22 June, Parliament's ethics body imposed a further 30-day exclusion on Shehaj and a 20-day exclusion on Kapri, stating that the two had obstructed the 18 June sitting during their confrontation with Rama. The additional measure against Shehaj followed a separate 30-day suspension imposed over an earlier confrontation with finance minister Petrit Malaj, extending his consecutive exclusion from parliamentary work to 60 days.

Lëvizja Bashkë and its leaders Arlind Qori and Redi Muçi were also among the earliest political actors visibly associated with the protests, although the demonstrations were presented by organizers as civic rather than party-led. Qori and Muçi supported the protesters' demands, criticized both Rama and Berisha, and framed the movement as a broader rejection of the old political establishment.

Lëvizja Shqipëria Bëhet, led by Adriatik Lapaj, also became visible during the Tirana phase of the protests, while activists linked to the movement promoted protest-related mobilizations and diaspora solidarity actions. Media coverage of these parties emphasized both their growing visibility and the continued sensitivity among protesters over attempts by any party to dominate the movement.

=== President ===
On 24 June, President Bajram Begaj reacted publicly to the protests for the first time. Speaking during a ceremony marking the 100th anniversary of the creation of the Tirana Prefecture, Begaj said that citizens were peacefully expressing concerns and expectations in public and that the right to participate in public life was protected by the Constitution of Albania. He also said that this right had to be exercised in accordance with the Constitution and the law, and linked democratic consolidation to the joint commitment of citizens and institutions to the rule of law and the public interest.

=== Project developers ===
The project developer said that the development was being carried out in accordance with Albanian law and applicable planning procedures. Reuters quoted Asher Abehsera, chairman of Sazan Real Estate Development LLC, as saying that the developers' focus remained on "responsible stewardship, environmental enhancement, job creation, and creating long-term value for local communities". On 22 June, Affinity Partners, the investment firm led by Jared Kushner, denied that it was involved in the Zvërnec resort project, saying that the project was being developed by Sazan Real Estate Development LLC and that any American partners were acting in a personal capacity rather than on behalf of Affinity Partners.

=== State institutions and law enforcement ===
==== Albanian State Police ====
Following the 30 May incident in Zvërnec, the Albanian State Police announced investigations into the events at the protest site. The General Directorate of State Police suspended the Director of Police of Vlorë, saying that information initially released about the incident had been inaccurate; police also announced criminal proceedings against 15 protesters, while two private security employees were placed under investigation. On 1 June, State Police revoked the licences of the private security companies Myrto Security 1.3A and Major Security, citing violations connected to violence during the Zvërnec protest.

During the Tirana phase of the protests, police measures became a recurring source of confrontation. Police used barriers and cordons during several demonstrations, opened criminal proceedings after highway and Fan Zone incidents, and used force during the 2 July clashes outside Parliament, where the Associated Press reported that police used tear gas, pepper spray and water cannon after protesters threw rocks, eggs, bottles and other objects. Albanian outlets also reported mass detentions, police entry into a nearby café and allegations by lawyers that several detainees had been mistreated or arrested irregularly. On 4 July, lawyer Gentian Serjani alleged that detained protester Niko Qarkaj had been beaten while in custody after suffering epileptic seizures and later said that the People's Advocate and the Albanian Helsinki Committee had been notified.

On 3 July, the Albanian Helsinki Committee, after monitoring the 2 July protest outside Parliament, said that individual acts of violence did not justify disproportionate police force. It raised concern that tear gas had allegedly been used without a public warning or sufficient time for voluntary dispersal, and called for independent investigation into allegations of force against persons who had already been neutralised on the ground.

Top Channel later reported that two teams from the People's Advocate went to the hospital and the security block to verify allegations that Niko Qarkaj had been abused in custody and that his epileptic seizures had not been properly addressed.

On 9 July, State Police General Director Skënder Hita announced that cybercrime units were verifying an alleged coordinated online campaign involving more than 10,000 accounts that had posted negative reviews of hotels, restaurants and other tourism businesses. Lapsi.al linked the campaign to protest-related calls targeting businesses described as close to Rama or as having benefited from public property or other government advantages. Hita said affected businesses should file complaints and preserve electronic evidence, while police would refer materials to prosecutors if criminal elements were identified.

==== SPAK ====
On 2 June, the Special Structure against Corruption and Organized Crime (SPAK) announced a preliminary corruption investigation into how coastal land titles within the development zone had been processed and transferred to private entities. The Guardian later reported that SPAK had also launched an inquiry into controversial legislative changes adopted in 2024 regarding protected areas.

On 18 June, the Organized Crime and Corruption Reporting Project (OCCRP), together with its Albanian partner SHTEG, reported that court documents from a separate drug-trafficking investigation overlapped with SPAK's inquiry into land transactions connected to the planned resort. According to OCCRP, a Special Court order imposed a preventive seizure on a bank account holding more than €110 million linked to the sale of land between Artur Shehu and Albanian Land Development sh.a.; the report stated that court documents identified Shehu as a suspect in offences including money laundering and participation in an organized crime group, while also noting that the documents did not implicate Albanian Land Development in wrongdoing and that there was no evidence that Ivanka Trump, Jared Kushner or investors in the resort project had knowledge of SPAK's investigation or the allegations against Shehu.

On 11 July, Reuters reported that SPAK case files it had reviewed alleged that Shehu and associates had used forged land-ownership documents and laundered money from drug trafficking to acquire and transfer properties, including land later sold to Albania Land Development for the planned resort. Reuters reported that the sale funds, about €110 million, had been frozen in a notary account, and that no wrongdoing was alleged against Kushner, Sazan Real Estate Development, Albania Land Development or other project investors. A spokesperson for Sazan Real Estate Development said the company believed the land acquisitions had been conducted lawfully and that it would cooperate with any lawful process.

=== International response ===
==== European Union ====
The Delegation of the European Union to Albania requested information from Albanian authorities about developments in the area and emphasized the importance of environmental protection and conservation standards in the context of Albania's EU accession process. On 7 June, the European Commission warned that the proposed project could complicate Albania's EU accession process, stating that the country had to comply with EU environmental legislation, including Chapter 27, and reiterating concerns over recent changes to Albania's protected-areas and strategic-investments laws.

On 14 July, European Commissioner for Enlargement Marta Kos said that environmental safeguards applicable to the Zvërnec project formed part of Albania's EU accession criteria. Kos stated that, before the protests began, the Commission and Albanian authorities had agreed that the 2024 amendments affecting the laws on protected areas and strategic investments should be repealed as part of Albania's obligations under Chapter 27, and she urged the authorities to act as soon as possible. She also described protest as a component of democracy and called on the government to address citizens' concerns.

Rama responded that the Strategic Investments Law would be repealed because it had fulfilled its purpose and that the government was discussing replacement legislation with the European Commission based on EU standards. However, he rejected repealing the Protected Areas Law, describing it as one of the government's best laws and saying that it would instead be adapted to meet EU requirements.

Several MEPs and European political groups expressed support for the protesters' environmental and anti-corruption demands. German MEP Sebastian Everding addressed the issue in the European Parliament, declaring that "Albania is not for sale", while Dutch MEPs Tineke Strik and Anna Strolenberg called for stronger European attention to transparency, public resources, social needs and environmental safeguards. Italian MEP Ilaria Salis described the protests as a defence of popular sovereignty and later joined the demonstrations in Tirana, where she linked the movement to opposition against corruption, oligarchic privilege and clientelist development models.

The Greens–European Free Alliance group in the European Parliament expressed support for the protest movement and announced a mission to Albania from 29 June to 1 July led by Strik and including MEPs Cristina Guarda, Vicent Marzà, Daniel Freund, Jutta Paulus and Strolenberg. The group said the delegation would visit the Vjosa–Nartë Protected Landscape and meet local communities, environmental defenders and government representatives. Members of the mission later joined the 30th consecutive protest in Tirana and said that concerns raised by protesters would be brought to Brussels.

Other European party families also reacted. The European Democratic Party said that the protests had expanded from opposition to a contested real-estate project in a protected area into a wider demand for accountability and democratic renewal. Its secretary-general, MEP Sandro Gozi, said that the message of the protests had to be heard in both Tirana and Brussels and submitted a priority written question to the European Commission on Albania's obligations regarding the rule of law, transparency, environmental protection and peaceful protest. Syri TV also reported that findings from a European People's Party fact-finding mission had raised concerns about state capture, systemic corruption, organized-crime influence, money laundering, public procurement, infrastructure projects and Albania's media environment.

On 17 June, the European Parliament adopted its resolution on the 2025 Commission Report on Albania. The resolution stated that corruption remained a serious concern, called for the independence and resources of anti-corruption institutions such as SPAK to be protected, and expressed concern over Albania's strategic-investment and permitting frameworks in environmentally sensitive areas. It also called for the repeal of the 2024 amendments to the Law on Protected Areas, which Parliament said weakened environmental oversight and allowed large-scale tourism infrastructure inside protected areas.

==== United States ====
U.S. political figures, media outlets and commentators reacted to the protests largely because of the involvement of Jared Kushner and Ivanka Trump in the planned development. On 9 June, U.S. Senator Bernie Sanders wrote that more than 100,000 people in Albania had protested against what he called an environmentally destructive luxury resort planned by Kushner and his Qatari billionaire partners, describing the case as an example of "global oligarchy". Rama replied that Albania was "a country, not a line in an American political debate" and disputed the protest figures cited by Sanders.

On 12 June, Medea Benjamin, co-founder of CODEPINK and Global Exchange, published an article titled "Long Live Albania's Flamingo Revolution", describing the movement as a challenge to billionaire-led development, secretive government deals and corruption. Democracy Now! also reported on the protests under the headline "Albania Is Not For Sale", describing the demonstrations as protests against a Kushner-linked luxury resort and noting that participants were demanding Rama's resignation.

Conservative commentator Candace Owens criticized Ivanka Trump and Jared Kushner over the Albania project. The Daily Beast reported that Owens devoted a podcast segment to attacking the planned Sazan development and referred to the protests in Albania against the project. The Jewish Telegraphic Agency, republished by The Jerusalem Post, also reported that Owens wrote approvingly of Albania's protests on X, while presenting her remarks as part of a broader discussion of antisemitic conspiracy rhetoric around the margins of the protest debate.

On 27 June, U.S. Senator Jon Ossoff of Georgia referred to the project during a campaign event, presenting it as an example of the relationship between private interests and political power in the Trump family. According to Hashtag.al and Vox News, Ossoff said that after Trump's return to the White House, the Albanian government granted Kushner's company strategic-investor status, which he argued accelerated procedures for permits and approvals. He referred to the protests as the "Flamingo Revolution" and said ordinary Albanians did not agree with the deal.

On 3 July, Albanian media reported that U.S. Representative and Trump ally Joe Wilson of South Carolina had offered an amendment titled "Business in the Balkans" to Rules Committee Print 119–33. The amendment would require the United States Secretary of State, in coordination with the Director of National Intelligence, to submit a classified report to the appropriate congressional committees examining narcotrafficking in Albania, the role of the Government of Albania in facilitating such narcotrafficking, and political repression by the government.

==== Other countries ====
- Greece – The Greek Ministry of Foreign Affairs expressed concern over the events in Zvërnec, stating that a Greek citizen had been injured during a protest concerning residents' property rights. The ministry said that the Greek Embassy in Tirana had requested full clarification of the incident and accountability from Albanian authorities, while emphasizing rule of law, minority property rights and environmental protection in the context of Albania's alignment with the European acquis.
- Italy – The Greens and Left Alliance, through Angelo Bonelli, condemned Rama, accused him of selling Albania's natural patrimony to foreign investors and expressed solidarity with the protests.
- Israel – Israeli ambassador to Tirana Galit Peleg said the protest was legitimate but expressed concern that anti-Israeli slogans, messages and symbols used by some participants could fuel antisemitism. She said some banners reminded her of Germany in the 1930s.
- Kosovo – Former Vetëvendosje parliamentary candidate Hysamedin Ferraj joined the protests in Tirana, appearing alongside Arlind Qori of Lëvizja Bashkë. His participation followed earlier involvement by Vetëvendosje activists in protests opposing the project and calling for political change.
- Russia – On 3 July, the Russian Embassy in Albania reacted after Taulant Balla and minister Blendi Gonxhja alleged or suggested Russian involvement in the protests. The embassy said that claims about "Kremlin involvement" were baseless, stated that Russia followed a principle of non-interference in the internal affairs of foreign states, and called on Albanian politicians not to seek enemies "where they do not exist".

Graffiti in Paris in solidarity with the Protests in Tirana.

== Public and organisational support ==
=== Environmental and other organizations ===
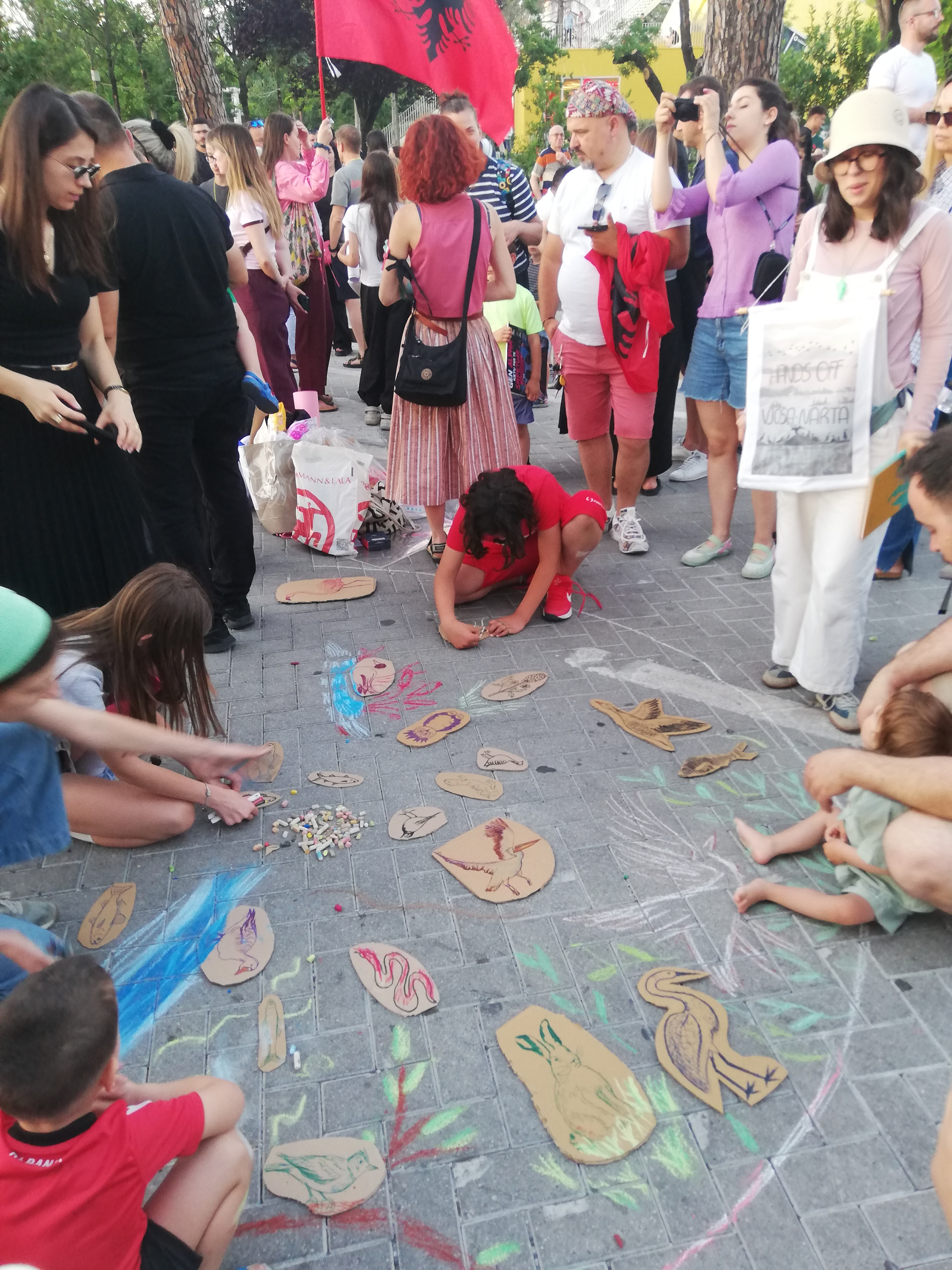
Protesters with depiction of various animals on Sazan on Tirana's Dëshmorët e Kombit Boulevard, 7 June

==== Environmental organizations ====
Environmental organizations opposed the project on the grounds that it threatened the Vjosa–Narta wetland ecosystem and protected coastal habitats. Eighteen environmental organisations announced a boycott of consultations with the Ministry of Tourism and Environment until the amendments to the Law on Protected Areas were withdrawn, rejecting participation in a process they said did not address the weakening of protected-area safeguards.

PPNEA-BirdLife Albania called for construction to halt, heavy machinery to be removed, fencing to be dismantled and damaged habitats to be restored before any consultation could begin. The World Wildlife Fund condemned the development activities in the area and called on the Albanian government to stop the works, comply with environmental legislation and respect international conservation commitments. EuroNatur argued that required environmental procedures had not been properly followed and that EU-linked nature protection standards, including Natura 2000 and the Emerald Network, had been ignored. Riverwatch has actively supported the movement by coordinating international advocacy campaigns and public petitions to resist commercial development within the protected delta area. The Climate Action Network also supported the protests and called for an immediate halt to construction, the restoration of full legal protections and stronger guarantees for public participation in environmental decision-making.

==== Academic and professional groups ====
The Union of University Employees of Albania (SPUSH) supported the protests, describing them as an expression of active citizenship and democratic engagement. The union linked the demonstrations to the protection of natural areas, public assets, transparency and citizen consultation, and called for academic expertise to be included in decisions on the environment, sustainable development and public property.

On 25 June, 260 academics, students and professors from different countries signed a public letter supporting the protests. The letter expressed solidarity with demands for environmental protection, democratic accountability and the rule of law, and said the movement had expanded beyond the environmental issue to include concerns over transparency, corruption, state capture and weak democratic institutions.

==== Civic and international advocacy groups ====
Several civic, political and international advocacy groups also expressed support for the protests. The European Democratic Party called on the Albanian government to listen to citizens and said that democratic participation, rule of law and environmental protection were central to the movement. The International Socialist League supported the protesters' demands and the right of local communities to decide over their land and natural resources. The Council of Albanian Ambassadors supported the protests and called for Rama to resign.

The Albanian national-team supporters' association Tifozat Kuq e Zi boycotted the friendly match against Luxembourg on 6 June and joined the protest outside the prime minister's office. Code Pink described the movement as a challenge to billionaires, corruption and environmental destruction. Maltese activist group Moviment Graffitti also issued a solidarity statement with Albanian citizens and environmental groups opposing construction in the Vjosa–Narta wetland.

=== Public figures ===
Public figures who publicly supported the protests include:

- Dua Lipa
- Robert Aliaj
- Eva Buzo
- Cristina Guarda
- Lorik Cana
- Elvira Dones
- Aurela Gaçe
- Ermonela Jaho
- Marjana Koçeku
- Jonida Maliqi
- Jutta Paulus
- Sonila Meço
- Bernie Sanders
- Joe Hoxha
- Shkodra Elektronike
- Alban Skënderaj
- Sebastian Everding
- Tayna
- Lea Ypi
- Robert Wilton
- Florjan Binaj
- Ilaria Salis
- Tineke Strik
- Anna Strolenberg
- Nicolae Ștefănuță
- Vula Tsetsi
- Bujar Asqeriu
- Dalina Buzi
- Ema Andrea
- Gala Dragot
- Mehdi Malkaj
- Olta Gixhari
- Alma Çupi
- Dea Mishel
- Fjoralba Ponari
- Erkand Qerimaj
- Livia Bunga
- Visjan Ukcenaj
- Fatos Lubonja
- Behar Gjoka
- Sindi Manushi
- Medea Benjamin
- Angelo Bonelli
- Jon Ossoff

=== Other reactions ===
The protests in Albania were also joined by foreign tourists, who expressed solidarity with the demonstrators. American singer Katy Perry drew attention on social media after posting a comment "Delulu island" under a video in which Ivanka Trump discussed a proposed tourism development project on Sazan Island. A photograph of protesters in Tirana during ongoing demonstrations was selected by The Guardian as one of its "photos of the day".

== See also ==
- 2025-2026 Albanian opposition protests
- 2022 Albanian protests
- 2019 Albanian opposition protests
- 2018–2019 student protests in Albania
- 2017 Albanian opposition protests
- 2011 Albanian opposition demonstrations
- 2026 European unrest
- 2026 French student protests
