= Aliaj (surname) =

Aliaj is an Albanian surname. Notable people with the surname include:

- Adrian Aliaj (born 1976), Albanian footballer
- Robert Aliaj (born 1960), Albanian visual artist and former singer
- Toni Aliaj (born 1999), Croatian footballer
