= Trade unions in Albania =

- National organization(s): BSPSh, KSSh
- Primary legislation: Article 14, Constitution (1991)

International Labour Organization
- Albania is a member of the ILO

Convention ratification
- Freedom of Association: 3 June 1957
- Right to Organise: 3 June 1957

Trade unions in Albania have had an unstable existence in recent decades, mirroring the regional political turbulence in Albania. Since the 1991 defeat of the Albanian Party of Labour (APL), independent trade unions have asserted themselves, with two main national trade union centres; the United Independent Albanian Trade Unions (BSPSh) and the Confederation of Trade Unions (KSSh).
