= Union of the Independent Trade Unions of Albania =

Albanian national confederation of unions

BSPSH
- Union of Independent Trade Unions of Albania
- Founded: 1991
- Headquarters: Tirana, Albania
- Location: Albania
- Members: 85,000
- Key people: Gezim Kalaja, president
- Affiliations: ITUC

The Union of the Independent Trade Unions of Albania (BSPSH) is a national confederation of trade unions in Albania. It was established in 1991 and held its first national conference in February, 1992. It has an estimated membership of 85,000.

It was originally led by Valer Xheka. After a tumultuous and violent transition, including charges of a political takeover by Azem Hajdari, in 1998 the Supreme Court of Albania recognized Xhevdet Lubani as the legitimate leader.
