= Confederation of Trade Unions (Albania) =

National trade union federation in Albania

KSSh
- Confederation of Trade Unions
- Headquarters: Tirana, Albania
- Location: Albania
- Members: 100,000 (est.)
- Key people: Kol Nikollaj, president
- Affiliations: ITUC
- Website: kssh.org

The Confederation of Trade Unions (KSSh) is a national trade union federation in Albania. It is a successor organization to the Trade Unions of Albania.

It was led by Kastriot Muco until November 2004 and has an estimated membership of 100,000. Actual president Kol Nikolli took over the lead of the institution after a narrow victory in the CTUA Congress elections on 24 November 2004. This was in many ways the first time that in a political organisation a change happened through democratic elections, where trade union delegates could for the first time vote for an alternative, represented by the most reformist trade union leader in Albania. It was considered to be a victory not only for the Albanian Trade Union Confederation - KSSH, but for all the Albanian trade union movement. Moreover, it was considered to be a challenge for the political parties in Albania, who so far (2007) have been unable to undergo such a process.
