= Toni Aliaj =

Croatian footballer

Personal information
- Date of birth: 6 January 1999 (age 27)
- Place of birth: Seraing, Belgium
- Position: Defender

Youth career
- –2012: Dinamo Zagreb
- 2012–2014: HAŠK
- 2014–2015: Hrvatski Dragovoljac
- 2015–2017: Lokomotiva
- 2017–2018: Lazio

Senior career*
| Years | Team | Apps | (Gls) |
| 2018–2021 | Tabor Sežana | 36 | (0) |
- * Club domestic league appearances and goals as of 28 May 2022

Toni Aliaj (born 6 January 1999) is a professional footballer who last played as a defender for Slovenian club Tabor Sežana. Born in Belgium and raised in Croatia, he is the son of Albanian football agent and former professional footballer Adrian Aliaj.

== Career ==
Aliaj developed through the youth systems of Dinamo Zagreb, HAŠK, Hrvatski Dragovoljac and Lokomotiva before spending the 2017–18 season with Italian club Lazio.

He began his senior career with Slovenian side Tabor Sežana, making 36 appearances between 2018 and 2021. Ahead of the second half of the 2019–20 season, Aliaj temporarily returned to Croatia due to heart-related problems.
