= PPNEA =

Environmental non-governmental organization in Albania

Protection and Preservation of Natural Environment in Albania
- Qendra për Ruajtjen dhe Mbrojtjen e Mjedisit Natyror në Shqipëri
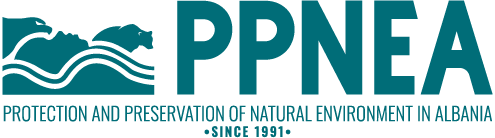
- Abbreviation: PPNEA
- Formation: 5 June 1991; 35 years ago
- Founder: Lekë Gjiknuri
- Founded at: Tirana, Albania
- Type: Non-governmental organization
- Purpose: Nature conservation, biodiversity protection, wildlife research and environmental advocacy
- Headquarters: Rruga Janos Hunyadi, Godina 32, Ap. 11, 1019 Tirana, Albania
- Region served: Albania
- Executive director: Aleksandër Trajçe
- Affiliations: BirdLife International, International Union for Conservation of Nature
- Revenue: €719,975 (2024)
- Website: ppnea.org

Protection and Preservation of Natural Environment in Albania (PPNEA; Albanian: Qendra për Ruajtjen dhe Mbrojtjen e Mjedisit Natyror në Shqipëri) is an Albanian environmental non-governmental organization based in Tirana. Established on 5 June 1991, it is described by PPNEA and international conservation organizations as the first environmental organization in Albania.

The organization works on the conservation of threatened species and habitats, wildlife and habitat research, environmental education, advocacy for nature conservation, and support for environmental civil society organizations in Albania. PPNEA is the Albanian partner of BirdLife International and a member of the International Union for Conservation of Nature.

== History ==
PPNEA was officially established on 5 June 1991 by a special decree of the Academy of Sciences of Albania, emerging during a period of political, social and economic transition in Albania, when environmental issues had limited priority in public policy.

PPNEA has described its early role as providing an independent civil-society voice for environmental protection in Albania. In later years it expanded its work into wildlife monitoring, protected-area advocacy, community engagement, policy advocacy and cooperation with national and international conservation institutions.

== Activities ==
PPNEA's work focuses on the conservation of threatened, rare and keystone species; protection of areas with high biodiversity value; scientific research on wildlife and habitats; environmental education and awareness-raising; advocacy for nature conservation; and institutional development of environmental civil society organizations. BirdLife International describes the organization as engaging in scientific research, community involvement, strategic partnerships and collaboration with decision-making institutions.

The organization has been involved in wildlife conservation projects, including work on the critically endangered Balkan lynx. PPNEA states that it has participated in the Balkan Lynx Recovery Programme since 2006, with the programme focusing on monitoring, protected-area management and habitat conservation in Albania and the wider region. PPNEA has also worked on protected areas and biodiversity conservation in landscapes such as Prespa National Park, Shebenik-Jabllanicë National Park, Korab-Koritnik Nature Park, the lower Vjosa valley and the Narta Lagoon.

== Conservation campaigns ==
According to PPNEA, some of its major conservation achievements include its contribution to the establishment of Prespa National Park in 1999, Shebenik-Jabllanicë National Park in 2008, and Korab-Koritnik Nature Park in 2011.

The organization has frequently linked its protected-area work to the conservation of the Balkan lynx and other threatened species. In 2024, PPNEA reported that the Balkan Lynx Recovery Programme had conducted camera-trapping surveys in the Polis–Gur i Zi–Valamara region and confirmed the presence of two Balkan lynx individuals. The organization also reported work on Mediterranean monk seal habitats, brown bear conservation, bird monitoring, ecological corridors, forest restoration, environmental education, and policy advocacy related to protected areas.

PPNEA has also campaigned on the protection of the Vjosa–Narta area, which it describes as one of Albania's most important wetland ecosystems. In its 2024 annual report, the organization stated that its work in the area included scientific monitoring, advocacy, public awareness, legal initiatives and habitat-restoration activities.

== Policy and advocacy ==
In 2024, PPNEA participated in the Civil Society and Think Tank Forum held alongside the 10th anniversary of the Berlin Process. The organization served as rapporteur for Working Group F, which focused on environmental protection and sustainable economic development, and contributed to policy recommendations on environmental rule of law, regional cooperation and sustainable economic practices in the Western Balkans.

== Affiliations ==
PPNEA is the Albanian partner of BirdLife International. It is also listed as a member of the International Union for Conservation of Nature, which describes PPNEA as a nationwide non-governmental environmental organization in Albania.

== Finances ==
In its 2024 annual report, PPNEA reported income of €688,555 from grant agreements and €31,420 from expertise contracts, for a combined reported income of €719,975. The same report listed €357,325 in staff costs and €363,140 for supplies and services for activities and projects.

== See also ==
- Environmental issues in Albania
- Biodiversity of Albania
- Balkan lynx
- BirdLife International
