= Robert Aliaj =

Albanian visual artist and former singer (born 1960)

Robert Aliaj Dragot
- Born: 18 February 1960 (age 66); Tirana, PR Albania
- Education: Jordan Misja Artistic Lyceum
- Occupations: Visual artist; Performer; Singer
- Spouse: Mimoza Dino
- Children: Krist Aliaj Dragot; Gala Dragot

Robert Aliaj Dragot (born 18 February 1960) is an Albanian visual artist and former singer. He has worked in painting, performance and music.

== Early life and education ==
Aliaj was born in Tirana. He studied painting at the Jordan Misja Artistic Lyceum.

Following the fall of communism in Albania, he emigrated first to Greece and later to Belgium.

== Career ==
During the 1980s and 1990s, Aliaj was active in music and painting. He later focused mainly on the visual arts.

He has also appeared in Albanian media as a commentator on cultural and social issues.

== Music ==
Aliaj participated in Albanian music festivals, including Festivali i Këngës.

In 2018, he took part in Kënga Magjike with the song "Ah ku më hodhi Zoti".

== Personal life ==
Aliaj is married to translator Mimoza Dino. They have two children, Gala Dragot and Krist Aliaj Dragot.
