= Ministry of Finances (Albania) =

Government ministry of Albania

- Ministria e Financave
- Logo of the ministry (2013–present)

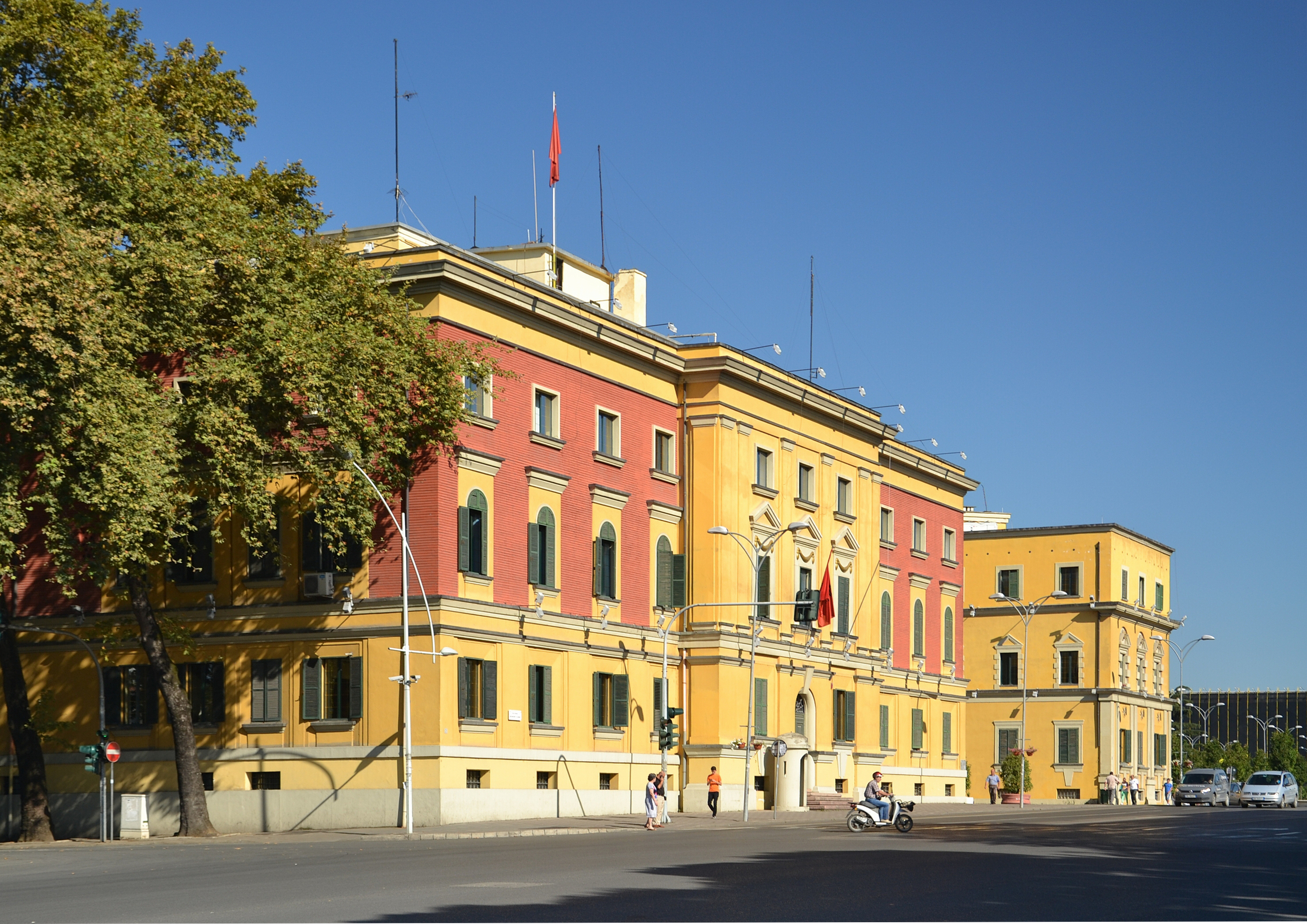
- Headquarters of the Ministry of Finances

Department overview
- Formed: 4 December 1912; 113 years ago
- Preceding Department: Ministry of Finances
- Jurisdiction: Council of Ministers
- Headquarters: Dëshmorët e Kombit Boulevard 3, 1001 Tirana, Albania
- Minister responsible: Petrit Malaj (PS)
- Website: financa.gov.al

The Ministry of Finances (Albanian: Ministria e Financave) is a department of the Albanian Government, responsible for designing and implementing fiscal policies, preparing and administering the state budget, managing public finances, and supervising the tax and customs system in Albania. The current Minister is Petrit Malaj, who has held this position since 2024 and was reconfirmed after the government reorganization in 2025.

== History ==
=== Early period ===
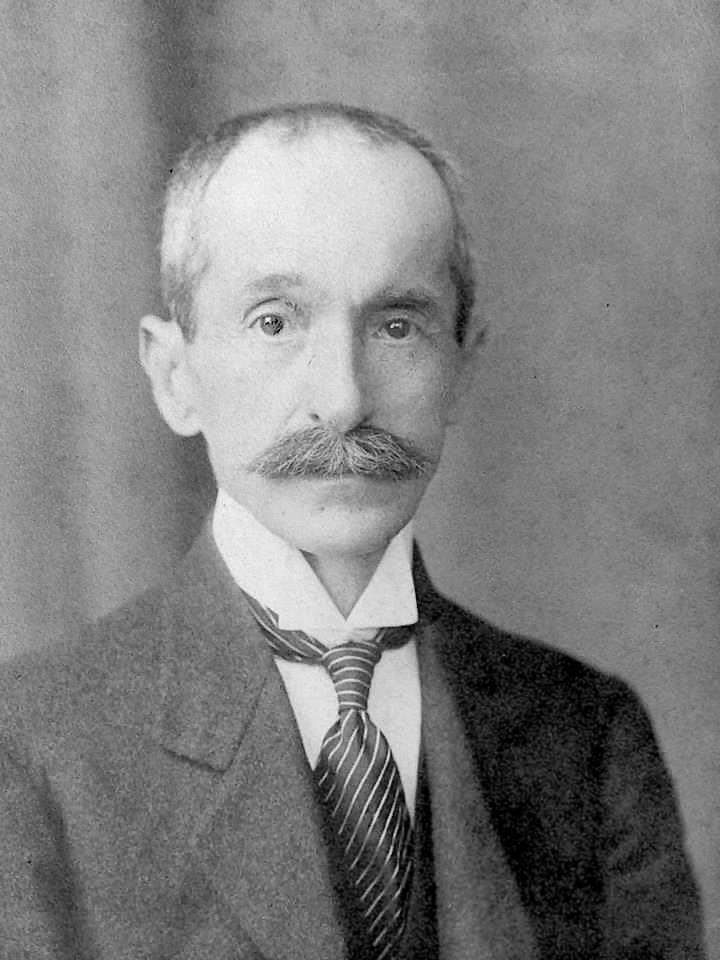
Abdi Toptani served as the first Minister of Finances (1912–1914)

It is one of the first departments created immediately after the independence of the Albania as part of the Provisional Government of Ismail Qemali formed on 5 December 1912. The first minister of Finance was appointed Abdi Toptani, where under his leadership were established the first financial institutions of the country, such as the establishment of the Bank of Albania on 4 October 1913, although this lasted for a few months. During the first government, the first fiscal laws were approved for customs tariffs, import and export taxes, etc.

With the start of the Second Balkan War and the separatist rebellions of Essad Pasha Toptani, the Great Powers offered the crown of Albania to Prince Wilhelm of Wied, which he accepted on 7 March 1914. In the governments formed by him, Gaqo Adhamidhi, and later Filip Noga were appointed Minister of Finance. Nothing significant in terms of finances happened, given the situation with the control in the territory and the rebellions of different areas during this period.

Only after the Congress of Lushnjë held from 28 to 31 January 1920 and after the mandate of the Delvina Government or as it is otherwise known National Government, the Ministry of Finances headquarters moved to Tirana. Ndoc Çoba was appointed Minister of Finances. During the following years, the so-called Financial Directorates were established in Shkodër, Durrës, Elbasan, Gjirokastër, Korçë, and Vlorë, as well as financial offices in other cities. Laws banning the export of gold, silver, and cereals also came into force. The Customs Directorate was also established and the collection of customs tariffs on goods began. Then the law on the minting of the first Albanian banknote. The merits for the financial reforms of these years have Ndoc Çoba, Ahmet Dakli, Kol Thaçi, as well as the first General Director of the Albanian Customs, Ahmet Boriçi.

=== Zog Presidency and the Second Albanian Kingdom ===
With the overthrow of Noli's government, Ahmet Zogu returned to power for the second time. On 25 January 1925, the Constitutional Assembly proclaimed the Republic of Albania, until then de jure continued to be the kingdom proclaimed in 1914 by the Great Powers. On 1 February 1925, Ahmet Zogu was elected President of Albania, being at the same time the head of the executive power. During this time, he restored stability in the country, as well as enabled the signing of important economic, political, and military agreements that strengthened the position of Albania.

At the beginning of 1925, a series of developments started for the Albanian economy, both positive and negative. Initiatives began to organize joint-stock companies in the field of industry, construction, transport. In the same year, the first Albanian currency, the Albanian Franga, was created. The introduction of foreign capital became the official policy of Zog's governments, which internally aimed to strengthen his power. He also used the granting of foreign capital concessions as a means of securing income for the regime, in the form of loans and rents, which was later thought of as a way out of the economic crisis.

Between 1925 and 1927 it is considered that 14 new companies were created, while in 1928, the number of enterprises reached 127. The domestic capital was 6 times larger than in 1927, making in this period partial stability of the economy was achieved.

The main feature of this period is the conclusion of agreements between the government of Tirana and Italian financial groups to invest in the country. Thus, in 1925 between the Albanian government of that time and the Italian financial group was signed the loan agreement of S.V.E.A where 96.4% of it was used by the Ministry of Public Works for road construction. This was done not only for the economic needs of the country but to create conditions for the penetration of foreign capital.

Trade was the main field of the Albanian economy. During this period the turnover of goods increased. Agricultural and livestock raw materials were mainly exported.

Many Italian, English, French and American companies began to be present in the Albanian economy through concession agreements or direct investments. Such as: SISMA (Societa Italiana Sfrutamento Miniere Albania); SEIA (Societa Electrica Italo-Albanese); ALBA (Azienda Lavori Boschi Albania); EIAA (Ente Italiano Attivita Agraria); SESA, which received the electricity concession in 7 cities in Albania; Anglo-Persian Oil Company; the American company Standard Oil Co.; Franco-Albanian kerosene union; German company INAG for forest use etc.

During the period 1925-1926, 23% of the territory of Albania was included in the concessions granted to foreign capital by the governments of Zog presidency. This gave a further impetus to the country's economy, which experienced some modest but still evident development in the period 1925-1928.

After the early elections on 25 August 1928, a change of form of government was proposed, the Statutory Commission proposed a change of form of the regime from a republic to a monarchy. On 1 September 1928, the Constituent Assembly proclaimed: Ahmet Zogu "King of the Albanians" under the name Zog I. At this time, the Basic Statute, the Civil Code, and the Commercial Code were adopted.

In 1929, the whole world would be gripped by the Great Depression caused by overproduction. Albania would not escape its effects either. It was exactly this year when the first signs of this crisis were seen, mainly in the monetary and financial system of the country, but they became more sensitive in 1930 and reached their peak in 1934-1935.

To mitigate the effects of the crisis of the continuous budget deficit and financial difficulties that were evidenced in many areas and sectors, many loans and credits were taken from Western countries, mostly from Italy. The bank reduced the amount of currency in circulation and deepened deflation. It artificially increased the value of the franc and which resulted in products' lower prices.

In the middle of 1935, Albania entered a phase of revival. The industry recovered. Zog created some fiscal facilities especially for the cement factory, which was exempt from taxes for three years.

=== Reorganization ===
Since the establishment of the institution, the Ministry of Finances has undergone several administrative changes to its organizational structure. When a new department was formed, it often merged with the ministry thus expanding its role, subsequently leading to the name of the ministry being changed. If that department later broke off as a separate ministry or was dissolved, the ministry reverted to its original name. (Note: The title "Substitutive" (gheg albanian: Zavëndësisht), often using the acronym "Zav.", references to the temporary exercise of duty by an official who was not formally appointed by the prime minister but occupied the interim role of the vacant minister. These officials are labeled in the list with an asterisk.)

- Ministry of Finances (1912–1939)
- Minister State Secretary of Finances (1939–1943)
- Ministry of Finances (1944–1992)
- Ministry of Finances and Economy (1992–1993)
- Ministry of Finances (1993–2017)
- Ministry of Finances and Economy (2017–2025)
- Ministry of Finances (2025 - present)

== Subordinate institutions ==
- General Directorate of Taxation
- General Directorate of Customs
- General Directorate for the Prevention of Money Laundering
- First Society of Financial Development
- Gambling Oversight Unit
- National Business Center
- Agency for the Administration of Confiscated Assets
- Credit Handling Agency
- General Directorate of Industrial Property
- Administrator of Borrowing Corporations
- Training Center for the Administration of Taxation and Customs

== Officeholders (1912–present) ==
No.	Name	Term in office
1	Abdi Toptani → Aziz Vrioni	4 December 1912	October 1913
2	Jorgji Çako	October 1913	22 January 1914
3	Gaqo Adhamidhi	14 March 1914	20 May 1914
4	Filip Noga	28 May 1914	3 September 1914
5	Nexhati Libohova	5 October 1914	27 May 1915
6	Haxhi Isuf Banka	27 May 1915	27 January 1916
*	Fejzi Alizoti (Note: Fejzi Alizoti served as a delegate from 1918 to 1920.)	25 December 1918	29 January 1920
7	Ndoc Çoba	30 January 1920	14 November 1920
8	Tef Curani	15 November 1920	16 October 1921
9	Ahmed Dakli → Kol Thaçi	16 October 1921	12 December 1921
10	Sulejman Starova	12 December 1921	24 December 1921
11	Kol Thaçi	24 December 1921	25 February 1924
12	Luigj Gurakuqi	3 March 1924	16 April 1924
13	Mufid Libohova	30 May 1924	10 June 1924
–	Luigj Gurakuqi	16 June 1924	24 December 1924
–	Mufid Libohova	6 January 1925	23 September 1925
–	Sulejman Starova	28 September 1925	10 February 1927
14	Fejzi Alizoti	12 February 1927	20 October 1927
–	Sulejman Starova	24 October 1927	10 May 1928
15	Milto Tutulani	11 May 1928	5 March 1930
–	Kol Thaçi	6 March 1930	11 April 1931
16	Lame Kareco	20 April 1931	7 December 1932
17	Abdurrahman Dibra	11 January 1933	16 October 1935
18	Rrok Gera	21 October 1935	7 November 1936
–	Kol Thaçi	9 November 1936	7 April 1939
*	Kosta Marku (Note: Kosta Marku served as member in charge in 1939.)	8 April	12 April 1939
–	Fejzi Alizoti	12 April 1939	5 April 1940
19	Kemal Vrioni	5 April 1940	3 December 1941
20	Shuk Gurakuqi	3 December 1941	4 January 1943
21	Loro Musani	18 January 1943	11 February 1943
22	Kosta Marku	12 February 1943	28 April 1943
23	Andon Beça	11 May 1943	10 September 1943
24	Sokrat Dodbiba	5 November 1943	16 June 1944
*	Ramadan Çitaku (Note: Ramadan Çitaku served as member in charge from May until October 1944.)	28 May 1944	23 October 1944
–	Rrok Gera	18 July 1944	28 August 1944
25	Et'hem Cara	6 September 1944	25 October 1944
26	Ramadan Çitaku	23 October 1944	6 February 1948
27	Kiço Ngjela	6 February 1948	21 November 1948
28	Abdyl Këllezi	23 November 1948	31 July 1953
29	Tuk Jakova	1 August 1953	19 July 1954
–	Abdyl Këllezi	20 July 1954	3 June 1956
30	Aleks Verli	4 June 1956	28 October 1974
31	Lefter Goga	28 October 1974	11 November 1976
32	Haki Toska	12 November 1976	18 December 1981
33	Qirjako Mihali	15 January 1982	16 February 1984
34	Niko Gjyzari	16 February 1984	19 February 1987
35	Andrea Nako	20 February 1987	22 December 1990
36	Qemal Disha	22 December 1990	10 May 1991
37	Anastas Angjeli	11 May 1991	4 June 1991
38	Genc Ruli	11 June 1991	6 December 1991
39	Robert Çeku	18 December 1991	13 April 1992
–	Genc Ruli	13 April 1992	23 November 1993
40	Piro Dishnica	9 November 1943	3 December 1994
41	Dylber Vrioni	4 December 1994	10 July 1996
42	Ridvan Bode	11 July 1996	1 March 1997
43	Arben Malaj	11 March 1997	28 September 1998
–	Anastas Angjeli	2 October 1998	29 January 2002
44	Kastriot Islami	22 February 2002	29 December 2003
–	Arben Malaj	29 December 2003	10 September 2005
–	Ridvan Bode	11 September 2005	15 September 2013
45	Shkëlqim Cani	15 September 2013	17 February 2016
46	Arben Ahmetaj	26 February 2016	22 May 2017
47	Helga Vukaj	22 May 2017	13 September 2017
–	Arben Ahmetaj	13 September 2017	5 January 2019
48	Anila Denaj	17 January 2019	18 September 2021
49	Delina Ibrahimaj	18 September 2021	9 September 2023
50	Ervin Mete	9 September 2023	30 July 2024
51	Petrit Malaj	30 July 2024	Incumbent

== See also ==
- Taxation in Albania
- List of banks in Albania

== Sources ==
- Dervishi, Kastriot (2005), Historia e shtetit shqiptar 1912–2005: organizimi shtetëror, jeta politike, ngjarjet kryesore, të gjithë ligjvënësit, ministrat dhe kryetarët e shtetit shqiptar në historinë 93-vjeçare të tij (in Albanian), Shtëpia Botuese "55", OCLC 123286739
- Dervishi, Kastriot (2012), Kryeministrat dhe ministrat e shtetit shqiptar në 100 vjet (in Albanian), Tiranë: Shtëpia Botuese "55", ISBN 978-99943-56-22-5
- "Official Gazette of the Republic of Albania". Center of Official Publications (in Albanian).
- Krasniqi, Afrim (2009), Sistemet Politike në Shqipëri 1912-2009 (in Albanian), Tiranë: UFO Press, ISBN 978-99956-19-36-7
- Lampe, John R; Jackson, Marvin R (1982), Balkan economic history, 1550-1950: from imperial borderlands to developing nations, Bloomington: Indiana University Press, ISBN 978-0-253-30368-4, OCLC 7553792
