= Ermal Hasimja =

Albanian academic and educational administrator (born 1975)

- Born: Ermal Hasimja; 8 September 1975 (age 50); Tirana, PR Albania
- Education: University of Tirana; Paris VIII University; London School of Economics
- Occupations: Academic, lecturer, educational administrator
- Years active: 2001–present

Ermal Hasimja (born 8 September 1975) is an Albanian academic, lecturer and educational administrator. He currently serves as the administrator of the private high school "Ernest Koliqi" in Tirana, Albania.

== Early life and education ==
Hasimja was born in Tirana on September 8, 1975. He completed his undergraduate studies in journalism at the University of Tirana from 1994 to 1998. He later attended Paris VIII University in France, where he earned his bachelor's, master's, and doctoral degrees in political science between 1998 and 2006. In 2008, he conducted postdoctoral research at the London School of Economics in the United Kingdom, focusing on political representation.

== Career ==
In the early stages of his career, Hasimja worked with international organizations in Kosovo, managing projects related to public administration and local governance. From 2002 to 2004, he served as director of the Public Administration and Local Government Program at the Kosovo Foundation for Open Society and as manager of Radio Plus in Pristina.

In 2005, he became a member of the Policy Orientation Committee (KOP) of the Democratic Party of Albania and served as a public relations adviser to the Prime Minister. After concluding this role, he returned to academia and became involved in educational initiatives.

Between 2005 and 2010, Hasimja taught at the University of Tirana, where he also headed the Department of Political Science. He later served as vice-rector of the European University of Tirana, an institution where he was among the founding members. Since 2011, he has been the administrator of the private high school “Ernest Koliqi” in Tirana.

He has also lectured at New York University and at the Political School of the Council of Europe in Tirana and Pristina.

== Political activity ==
In the 2017 parliamentary elections, Hasimja ran as a candidate for parliament in the Tirana district, representing the political movement Challenge for Albania (Sfida për Shqipërinë).

In October 2025, he announced his independent candidacy for mayor of Tirana, following his proposal by Agron Shehaj, leader of the Opportunity Party (Partia Mundësia), ahead of the partial local elections scheduled for November 9, 2025.

On 7 October 2025, Hasimja announced that he was withdrawing from the mayoral race, stating that since Florjan Binaj had received support from several opposition political parties, he would no longer continue as an independent candidate. He said he would support Binaj in the upcoming election campaign.

== Publications ==
- E shkuar e pakryer (“Unfinished Past”), 2024.
