= Economy of the Kingdom of Albania (1928–1939) =

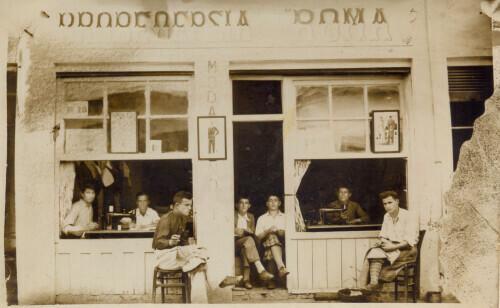
- View of a tailor shop, 1934
- Location: The Kingdom of Albania (1928-1939)
- Period: Interwar Period (1928–1939)

After the First World War, Albania was in a meagre state, suffering from lack of proper investment into public infrastructure and next to no industrial enterprises that were profitable to the Albanian state. With Albania not having a sufficient industrial base, it had a big trade deficit which was sought to be solved with protectionism, with foreign workers being banned in March of 1925, exports of meat and poultry being banned in the same month and export of corn, barley, and wheat being banned in May of 1929, to name some examples.

King Zog also utilized concessions, with one of the first laws being passed after Ahmet Zog returned to Albania being a coal concession to the Anglo-Persian Oil Company (February 1925), being followed by the creation of the Albanian National Bank where the Italian financial group owned 26% of the capital. The introduction of foreign capital became the official policy of Zog government, and in this year the first Albanian currency (Albanian gold franc) was created.

== Background ==
After the Congress of Lushnjë, which convened in January 1920, Albania fully gained national sovereignty, creating favorable political circumstances for the progress of the economy in general. As early as 1921, when the signs of stabilization of the internal situation and the external position of Albania appeared, the Albanian bourgeoisie, although weak economically and politically, wanted to expand in various fields, primarily in that of trade and industry. The efforts and initiatives of the Albanian bourgeoisie to set their own capitals in motion were seen in several major cities.

The Ministers of Finance of those years such as Ndoc Çoba, Kol Thaçi, Luigj Gurakuqi, Mufit Libohova, Sulejman Starova, Milto Tutulani, Aqif Dibra created the first Directorate of Albanian Customs. In 1920-1921, import taxes were increased and export taxes were reduced and canceled in order to protect domestic production, but also for fiscal purposes. In this period, laws and ordinances were issued to ban the export of gold, silver, brass and grain. The first customs law came out in 1922 and in this year the first Albanian customs tariff was created. Also, the first laws were issued for the regulation of state revenues.

At the end of 1922, the National Congress of Merchants was held, in which the need to increase capital, especially in industry, was raised. The first factories were established in important cities. In Durrës, where a cigarette factory and a flour factory were built; in Shkodër, where an alcohol and cigarette factory was built; in Vlora, the alcohol factory and an anonymous joint-stock company dealing with loading and unloading in the seaport of the city were established, also a factory dealing with match paper was established.

In 1922, the number of industrial enterprises reached 85, up from 34 in 1912. These included: 35 motorized flour mills, 11 oil factories, soap, tannery, cloth factories, 8 printing houses, etc. But these factories were small and low-yielding units. Most of them had an average of 2-5 workers each and only the greenhouse mine in Selenica, Vlora, which was the largest industrial center of the country, had about 500 workers.

In this period, there is also an increase in the interest of foreign capital for the Albanian economy and natural resources, especially for oil, bitumen, iron, copper, forests, etc. In Albania, at this time there were 50-100 million gold francs monetized.

According to the data, the amount of foreign trade liabilities was equal to 64,574 gold francs. Export in five years (total figure) was about 30% of imports.

Imports were detected in more than two-thirds. In this period, import per capita was calculated at 22.1 gold francs, while export at 6.5 gold francs.

Characteristic of this period is that investments in public works increased only with private capital investments without any contribution from the state. An average of 1 million gold francs per year was invested in this field by the local bourgeoisie. Hard work was set for 10 days a year, but the rich were given the opportunity to repay it with money. It is worth noting that in the school year 1921-1922, the technical school was opened in Tirana, which produced the first Albanian construction technicians.

For the first time during these years, air transport appeared in our country. Albania was the only country in Europe that introduced air transport service before rail transport. The first air transport service was established in November 1924, during the administration of Fan S. Noli. The Albanian government granted the air transport concession to the German company "Adria Aero Lloyd". Later, it was taken over by the Italian company "Ala-Littoria", which held it until 1943. With the air transport service, the capital was connected with a number of cities in the country and abroad.

== The return of Zog and the Republic of Albania (1925-1928) ==
In 1926, after the Organizational Law of the National Bank of Albania came into effect and that of the currency regulation (both on July 12, 1925), the monetary issue found a definitive solution, the use of foreign currency in official transactions was completely excluded. State. Thus, the National Bank, as the issuer with the exclusive privilege of issuing the State currency - did not fail to fulfill its burden and for the first time in the month of January 1926, the 20 and 5 gold franc banknotes were put into circulation, all as well as the metal coins of 100 gold francs. In those years they were put into circulation: in the month of February; a metal coin of 1/2 lek (equivalent to fr. gold 0.10); in the month of March a metal coin of 1 lek (equivalent to fr, gold 0.20); in the month of April banknotes of 100 fr. gold; and in the month of August, a nickel coin of 1/4 lek (equivalent to fr. gold 0.05).

During this time, 14 new enterprises were created. Their initial capital was 7.6 million gold francs, about 28% more than the capital of the enterprises of the period '21-'24. Trade was the main field of the Albanian economy. During this period, the turnover of goods increased.

In 1928, the number of enterprises reached 127. Domestic capital was 6 times larger than in 1927.

In this period, partial stability of the economy was achieved.

== The Kingdom of Albania (1928-1939) ==
In 1928, the Basic Statute, the Civil Code, the Commercial Code, etc. were approved. Laws were passed on agrarian reform, the abolition of ferexia, etc. The Islamic law was removed and replaced with the Civil Code based on the Swiss one, as Mustafa Kemal Atatürk had done with Turkey. King Zog promoted the world constructions in the country, the increase of well-being, the development of trade, the balancing of trade balances, the education of the new generation, the preparation of intelligence in Western universities, etc.

In 1929, the whole world would be gripped by the Great Depression caused by overproduction. Not even Albania would escape its effects. It was precisely this year when the first signs of this crisis were seen, mainly in the monetary and financial system of the country, but they became more sensitive in 1930. Its peak reached in 1934-'35.

Industry was almost completely paralyzed and many enterprises producing alcohol, building materials, tobacco and cigarettes, flour and flour, leather and shoes, etc., were paralyzed or bankrupt. The crisis deeply affected the entire credit system. At this time, as a result of the continuous budget deficit and financial difficulties that were evident in many areas and sectors of the country, from the various Albanian governments and King Zog I, many loans and credits were taken from Western countries, but in the vast majority from Italy.

In 1931, Albanian agriculture was affected by a great drought, which caused serious consequences in the bread supply of the population. In 1932, about 33% more wheat and corn was imported as a result of this situation.

In the middle of the 1930's, Albania entered a phase of revitalization. The industry recovered. Zog created some fiscal relief especially for the cement factory, which was exempted from taxes for three years.

Beyond the lack of domestic production, the printing industry was significantly affected by the crisis caused by the price difference between domestic and imported products. Imported flour was cheaper.

The government's attempt to boost domestic production by imposing a tax on cereal imports backfired. After overcoming the challenge that initially created the domestic production crisis, companies were engulfed by another crisis, that of competition coming from foreign overproduction. Many factories and mills were forced to close or work intermittently, further aggravating the bread supply situation of the population. Under these conditions, many flour factory owners joined creating cartels, but that lasted a short time. Like the alcohol companies in 1930, the flour companies merged in 1932 into two cartels.

In December 1935, the Albanian government submitted to Parliament a draft law that provided for measures to limit the import of certain goods.

The draft law essentially provided for some protectionist measures to protect the domestic industry and curb the outflow of money abroad. On the list of measures was the restriction of the import of cement, the ban on the import of motor vehicles and the ban on the import of ready-made clothing. In the justifying report of the initiative drawn up by the Ministry of National Economy, it was written that: "the need to control, direct and in some cases limit the import of certain goods is very clear and it seems to us that it does not even need an explanation". However, in its explanations, the ministry led at that time by Dhimitër Beratti explains that the restriction of cement import was required due to the fact that the country already had a factory in Shkodër for its production, "Portland Cement".

While the discussions were taking place, the cement factory had suspended its activity and the shareholders had asked for more guarantees to continue the operation, an element that is pointed out during the discussions and which seems to make the approval of this initiative more necessary.

However, in that meeting, the voting could not be carried out due to the absence of the majority of members. The final approval of the initiative was made a few days later, at the meeting of February 3, 1936, where the article on the restriction of the import of cement is amended by adding as an element the right of the government to intervene in the ceilings of the cement trading price, with in order for this measure not to have a negative impact, increasing the price for the population.

During the period '36-'38 the revival of the economy was noticed. Trade reached 32.7 million gold francs, with an increase of 65%. Export increased by 61.5%, while import by 67.3%. Exports in 1938 represented 66.3% of the level of 1928. During the period 1936-1938, the state budget grew.

The period of the Albanian kingdom was characterized by the increase in the number of capitalist enterprises in the field of world affairs, and in 1939 there were 36 enterprises of the construction industry. During the 10-year period 1929-1939, 850 km of main roads, 456 km of rural roads, 4,062 small bridges of 10,250 ml and 76 large bridges of 2,050 ml were built. The most important highways were Shkodër-Pukë, Ura e Matit-Peshkopi, Krujë-Burrel, Tirana-Elbasan, Lushnjë-Mbrostar.

Several concrete bridges were built. In 1938, the value of investments reached the figure of 150 million lek (lek at 1961 prices). On the eve of the fascist invasion, Albania had 300 trucks, 20 buses, 200 cars and vans.

During 1938, 95,000 tons of goods were transported, equal to 1 million tons per kilometer. In this same period, the total turnover of goods in the retail trade reached 3,900,000,000 old ALL (at 1947 prices).

The construction of the Port of Durrës began. Works were carried out on retaining works, irrigation canals, etc., which were interrupted by the beginning of the Second World War 1939-1944.
