= Fletorja Zyrtare =

Albanian government journal

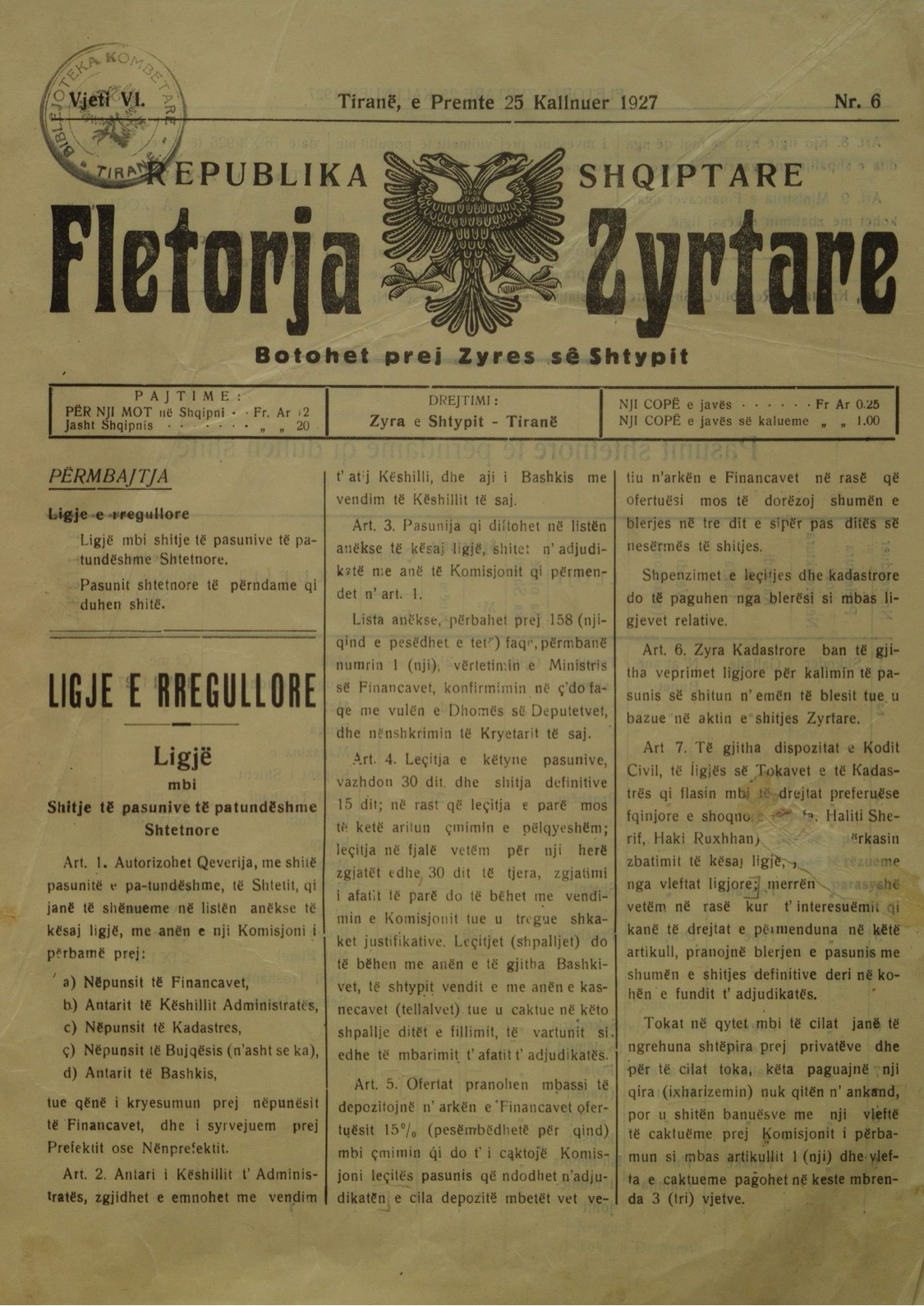
- Cover page of Fletorja Zyrtare in 1927
- Type: Government gazette
- Format: Digital
- Founder: Teki Selenica
- Publisher: Shtypshkronja "Nikaj"; Official Publishing Center
- Editor-in-chief: Mihal Sherko (1922–1932); Halil Maçi (1932–1936); Zef Dajçi (1936–1944)
- Founded: 30 July 1922; 104 years ago
- Language: Albanian
- Headquarters: Tirana, Albania
- Website: qbz.gov.al

Fletorja Zyrtare is the official government journal of the Republic of Albania. Published in a bulletin format, the journal is under the editorial oversight of the Official Publishing Center (Albanian: Qendra e Botimeve Zyrtare – QBZ) which is the only institution in the country authorized for its publication. It contains all administrative and legal acts of the state pursuant to articles 78 and 83 of the constitution.

== History ==
On March 29, 1922, Teki Selenica, a high-level government official who later drafted and organized the first legally sanctioned population census in Albania, published the first issue of his biweekly newspaper "Dit 'e re". On July 30 of that year, the 24th issue of the paper transformed into an official journal titled "Fletorja Zyrtare", which began to publish important administrative and legal acts of the state.

The journal was published in collaboration with Mihal Sherko, who later founded the Albanian Telegraphic Agency and his close associate Halil Maçi, the former first secretary of the Press Office at the Ministry of Foreign Affairs in the Kotta II Government. It was printed by "Shtypshkronja Nikaj", based in Shkodër, the same publishing company responsible for the printing of the book of Qarkore. On December 21, 1944, the journal changed its name to Gazeta Zyrtare (Official Gazette) and was under the control of the Ministry of Press, Propaganda and Popular Culture.

Fletorja Zyrtare reverted to its original name in February 1992, at the proposal of journalist and literary editor Pandeli Koçi.
