= List of Albanian politicians =

This is a list of Albanian office holders.

- Monarchs
- Heads of State
- Prime Ministers
- Foreign Ministers
- Finance Ministers
- Mayors
