= Canonical Basis of the High Council =

First constitution of the Albanian State

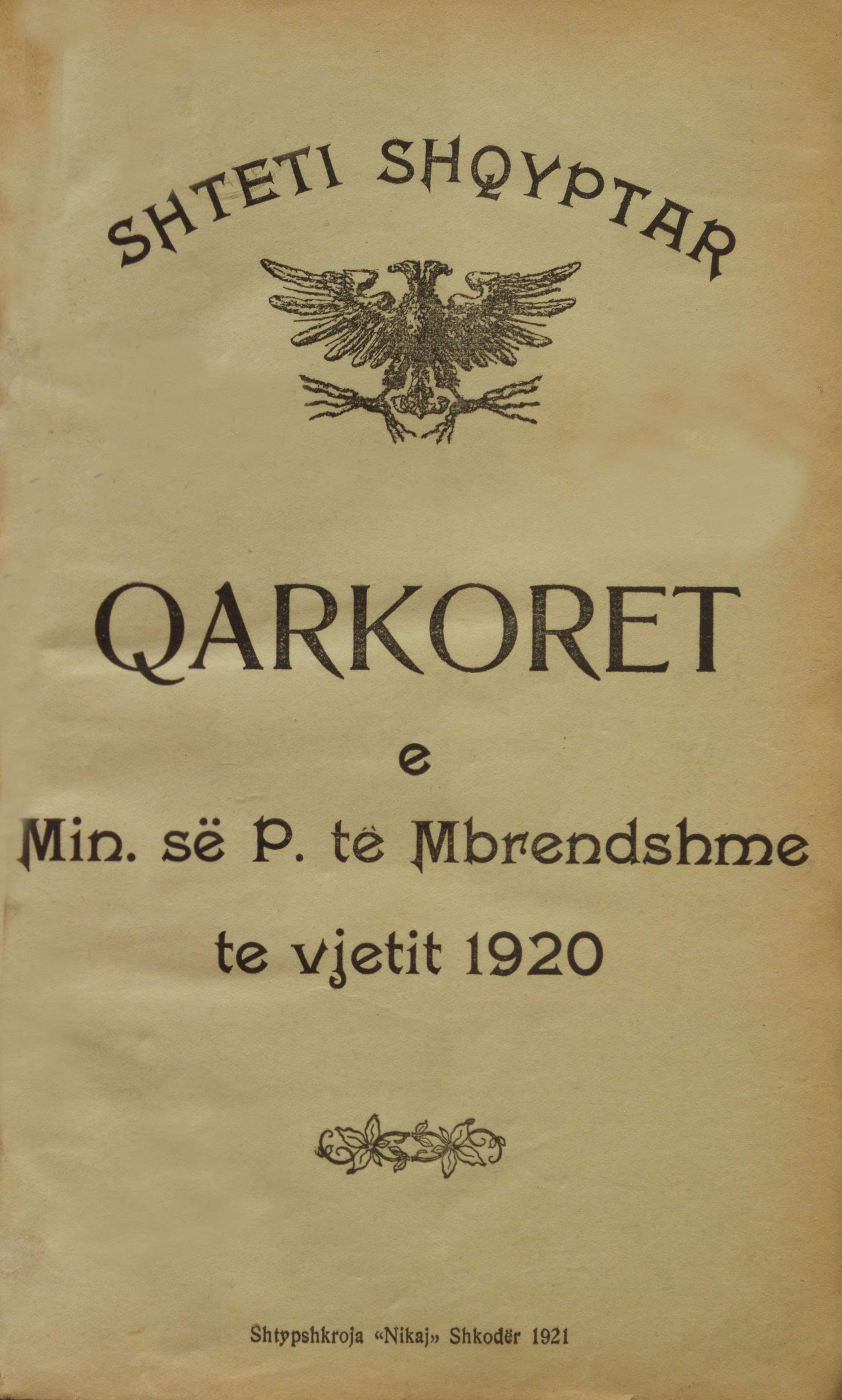
- The document of the Canonical Basis was published in 1920 by a qarkore of the Ministry of Internal Affairs.

Overview
- Original title: Bazet e Kanunores së Këshillës së Naltë
- Jurisdiction: Principality of Albania
- Date effective: 31 January 1920
- System: Constitutional monarchy
- Head of state: High Council: Luigj Bumçi; Aqif Pasha Elbasani; Abdi Toptani; Mihal Turtulli
- Executive: High Council, Senate, Cabinet
- Location: National Library
- Commissioned by: Congress of Lushnje
- Supersedes: Organic Statute of Albania

The Canonical Basis of the High Council (Albanian: Bazet e Kanunores së Këshillës së Naltë), often referred to as the "Statute of Lushnje", was the first constitution of the Albanian State, drafted and approved by national representation. It followed the Organic Statute of Albania, previously drawn up and imposed by the International Commission of Control. The statute upheld the monarchy as the official form of regime and appointed as the de facto head of state a collegial body of four members known as the High Council.

== History ==
In January 1920, a national congress convened in Lushnje that gathered representatives from all regions of Albania with the main purpose of restoring the country's territorial integrity. The congress opposed any type of foreign mandate or protectorate over Albania, subsequently repealing the Organic Statute which had been imposed by the Great Powers six years prior. In the aftermath that followed, a new document was enacted titled the "Canonical Basis of the High Council", which identified the National Assembly as the primary governing body. The assembly served as the basis for the election of a High Council, which in turn had the authority to appoint the Senate and the Cabinet (Government).

== Constitution ==
The original print in Albanian used a type of a transitional gheg dialect that read like a very basic monologue. It was published with noticeable grammatical errors and lacking flow in-between sentences.

Canonical Basis of the High Council

- I. The High Council is obliged to approve (test) any proposal that will be presented by the Cabinet and verified by the Senate.
- II. It has the authority in time of ministerial crisis to choose a Prime Minister for the formation of the new Cabinet which will come into force when approved by the Senate.
- III. If the elected Chairman of the Cabinet is rejected by the Senate in three consecutive sessions, the High Council is forced to convene a national meeting.
- IV. The High Council does not have the authority to dissolve the Senate and if there are disagreements between its members, the national meeting overthrows the High Council and dissolves the Senate.
- V. If one of the members of the High Council resigns, the other three continue in office. If two resign, the Senate will elect two others.
- VI. With the arrival of the King on the High throne, the subordinates recognize themselves as overthrown. After this decision was proposed by the Vice-President in consent that the voting of the candidates for the High Council be done openly, it was approved by all.

Mr. Iljas Bej Vrioni, the Delegate of Berat, proposes to the High Council Mr. Emzot Bumçi, Aqif P. Elbasani, Abdi B. Toptani and Dr. Turtulli, who are approved with a common voice and clapping hands. It was decided that Mr. Emzot Bumçi and Dr. Turtulli would remain in Paris and the other two were to oversee the work of the High Council. After the election of the High Council, the Vice-President proposes for the Cabinet to be elected at once. Having exchanged many opinions on the number of Ministers, it was decided by majority of the votes that there should be 6 (six). The Vice-President suggests the proposal of the members of the Cabinet be spoken. Mr. Bektash Cakrani, Delegate of Mallakastër, rises up and proposes the following:

- – Mr. Sylejman Bej Delvina
- – Iljas Vrioni
- – Ahmet Zogolli
- – Sotir Peci
- – Ndoc Çoba
- – Mehmet Konica

Since Mr. Iljas Bej Vrioni did not accept his nomination for personal reasons, Mr. Hoxha Kadri was proposed in his place and was confirmed. Following the election of the Cabinet, Mr. Kosturi, Delegate of Kolonjë, proposes that the oath be given before the Congress. The Vice-President, in response, agrees that it would be better for the High Council to submit the oath before the Congress and subsequently the Cabinet was approved by all members of the High Council. The Chairman of the Assembly of the High Council, Aqif Elbasani, asked that the Delegates also swear an oath to the High Council, which was accepted and the oaths were given according to the formulas that followed.

== See also ==
- Constitution of Albania
- High Council of Regency
