= Sulejman Starova =

Sulejman Starova may refer to:

- Sulejman Starova (footballer)
- Sulejman Starova (politician)
