= Kapri =

Kapri may refer to

Given, fictional or stage name

- Kapri (singer), Canadian singer
- Kapri Bibbs, former American football running back
- Kapri, list of Power Rangers Ninja Storm characters

Surname

- Bhuwan Chandra Kapri, Indian politician
- Bill Kahan Kapri, legal name of the American rapper Kodak Black
- Erald Kapri, Albanian journalist and politician
- Vinod Kapri, Indian filmmaker
