= High Council of Regency =

Political collegial body during two periods of Albanian history

- Këshilli i Naltë i Regjencës
- Flag used inside the headquarters of the High Council of Regency
- Formation: 30 January 1920; 24 October 1943
- Dissolved: 31 January 1921; 25 October 1944
- Type: council
- Purpose: to serve as a provisional caretaker government
- Headquarters: Sheshi "Fan Noli" 7
- Location: Tirana, Principality of Albania

The High Council of Regency (Albanian: Këshilli i Naltë i Regjencës) was a political collegial body that served as the de facto head of state of Albania in two separate time periods:

- The High Regency Council of the Principality of Albania from January 30, 1920 until January 31, 1925
- The High Regency Council of the Albanian Kingdom from October 24, 1943 until October 25, 1944

During the first period, the High Council acted on behalf of Prince Wilhelm of Wied, who despite having fled the country on 3 September 1914, was still considered legally the head of the Albanian State until 31 January 1925, when Ahmet Zogu declared Albania a republic.

During the second period, the High Council exercised the duties of the head of state and government when, after the capitulation of Italy, Albania was re-proclaimed independent and the 1928 constitution was re-recognized.

== Principality of Albania ==
The Congress of Lushnjë reaffirmed the monarchy as the form of the regime but until the quandary created by the prince's departure was to be resolved, the regency decided in the establishment of a temporary governing power named the "High Council", consisting of representatives from the four main religions of the country.

The Canonincal Basis of Lushnje defined the functions of the High Council which was obliged by law to approve every project proposals that were to be presented by the government and confirmed by the Senate (legislative body). The council had the authority, in case of a political crisis within the government, to choose a prime minister for the formation of a new cabinet. It could recall a meeting of the legislature when the prime minister was not confirmed in 3 consecutive voting sessions by the Senate. The council had no authority to dissolve the Senate, even if there were born disagreements between senators. The national assembly could terminate the council's tenure and dissolve the Senate. In the event of the resignation of one councilor, three other councilors carried on with their duties. When two councilors were absent, the Senate would elect two others. Elected members of the council swore their oath of office in the following way:

"I pledge in the name of the Divine, giving the Albanian faith (besa) and the word of honor before the assembly of the nation, that I will serve the people and the Albanian state with worthiness. I want to protect the laws and the full independence of the sacred fatherland".

=== Members ===
No.	Portrait	Name	Term in office		Government
Principality of Albania (1921–1925)
1		Aqif Pashë Biçakçiu (1860–1926)	31 January 1920	22 December 1921	Delvina ↓ Vrioni I, Vrioni II, Sacred Union, Koculi, Prishtina, Kosturi
1		Aqif Pashë Biçakçiu (1860–1926)	1 year, 10 months and 22 days		Delvina ↓ Vrioni I, Vrioni II, Sacred Union, Koculi, Prishtina, Kosturi
2		Luigj Bumçi (1872–1945)	31 January 1920	22 December 1921	Delvina ↓ Vrioni I, Vrioni II, Sacred Union, Koculi, Prishtina, Kosturi
2		Luigj Bumçi (1872–1945)	1 year, 10 months and 22 days		Delvina ↓ Vrioni I, Vrioni II, Sacred Union, Koculi, Prishtina, Kosturi
3		Mihal Turtulli (1856–1935)	31 January 1920	22 December 1921	Delvina ↓ Vrioni I, Vrioni II, Sacred Union, Koculi, Prishtina, Kosturi
3		Mihal Turtulli (1856–1935)	1 year, 10 months and 22 days		Delvina ↓ Vrioni I, Vrioni II, Sacred Union, Koculi, Prishtina, Kosturi
4		Abdi Toptani (1864–1942)	31 January 1920	25 May 1921	Delvina ↓ Vrioni I, Vrioni II, Sacred Union, Koculi, Prishtina, Kosturi
4		Abdi Toptani (1864–1942)	1 year, 3 months and 25 days		Delvina ↓ Vrioni I, Vrioni II, Sacred Union, Koculi, Prishtina, Kosturi
5		Omer Vrioni (1839–1928)	22 December 1921	2 December 1922	Kosturi ↓ Ypi
5		Omer Vrioni (1839–1928)	11 months and 10 days		Kosturi ↓ Ypi
6		Ndoc Pistulli (1860–1926)	22 December 1921	2 December 1922	Kosturi ↓ Ypi
6		Ndoc Pistulli (1860–1926)	11 months and 10 days		Kosturi ↓ Ypi
7		Refik Toptani (1870–1937)	22 December 1921	31 January 1925	Kosturi ↓ Ypi, Zogu I, Vërlaci I, Vrioni III, Noli, Zogu II
7		Refik Toptani (1870–1937)	3 years, 1 month and 9 days		Kosturi ↓ Ypi, Zogu I, Vërlaci I, Vrioni III, Noli, Zogu II
8		Sotir Peci (1873–1932)	22 December 1921	31 January 1925	Kosturi ↓ Ypi, Zogu I, Vërlaci I, Vrioni III, Noli, Zogu II
8		Sotir Peci (1873–1932)	3 years, 1 month and 9 days		Kosturi ↓ Ypi, Zogu I, Vërlaci I, Vrioni III, Noli, Zogu II
9		Xhafer Ypi (1880–1940)	2 December 1922	31 January 1925	Zogu I ↓ Vërlaci I, Vrioni III, Noli, Zogu II
9		Xhafer Ypi (1880–1940)	2 years, 1 month and 29 days		Zogu I ↓ Vërlaci I, Vrioni III, Noli, Zogu II
10		Gjon Çoba (1874–1943)	2 December 1922	24 May 1924	Zogu I ↓ Vërlaci I
10		Gjon Çoba (1874–1943)	1 year, 5 months and 22 days		Zogu I ↓ Vërlaci I

From 2 July 1924 until 24 December 1924, Fan Noli was acting head of the High Council.

== Albanian Kingdom (1943–1944) ==
The High Council of Regency was formed by a special parliament law on 21 October 1943, as a temporary collegial body that replaced the King for as long as he was not physically present in the country. The council had the rights of the head of state and was in charge of the General Command of the Armed Forces, the appointment of employees at the top ladder of state institutions, the decreeing of laws, treaties, etc. The council had no executive powers to declare war without the approval of the Parliament, except only in instances of self-defence by an invading foreign enemy. The post of the chairman of the council rotated for a period of 3 months but only Mehdi Frashëri fully exercised this duty. Other attributes were exercised according to the Statute of 1 December 1928.

On 25 October 1943, the National Assembly elected as members of the council: Mehdi Frashëri, Lef Nosi, Fuad Dibra and father Anton Harapi. The latter was present in all the meetings held, but took the oath on 13 January 1944, after having received the Pope's permission at the beginning of December 1943.

=== Members ===
No.	Portrait	Name	Term in office		Government
Albanian Kingdom (1943–1944)
1		Mehdi Frashëri (1872–1963)	24 October 1943	25 October 1944	Interim Executive Committee ↓ Mitrovica, Dine, Biçaku
1		Mehdi Frashëri (1872–1963)	1 year and 1 day		Interim Executive Committee ↓ Mitrovica, Dine, Biçaku
2		Lef Nosi (1877–1946)	24 October 1943	25 October 1944	Interim Executive Committee ↓ Mitrovica, Dine, Biçaku
2		Lef Nosi (1877–1946)	1 year and 1 day		Interim Executive Committee ↓ Mitrovica, Dine, Biçaku
3		Fuad Dibra (1886–1944)	24 October 1943	25 October 1944	Interim Executive Committee ↓ Mitrovica, Dine, Biçaku
3		Fuad Dibra (1886–1944)	1 year and 1 day		Interim Executive Committee ↓ Mitrovica, Dine, Biçaku
4		Anton Harapi (1888–1946)	13 January 1944	25 October 1944	Mitrovica ↓ Dine, Biçaku
4		Anton Harapi (1888–1946)	9 months and 12 days		Mitrovica ↓ Dine, Biçaku
4		Cafo Beg Ulqini (1893–1977)	22 July 1944	25 October 1944	Biçaku
4		Cafo Beg Ulqini (1893–1977)	1 year and 1 day		Biçaku

== See also ==
- History of Albania
