= Cafo Beg Ulqini =

Albanian politician (1893–1977)

Mustafa Alibegu OSK
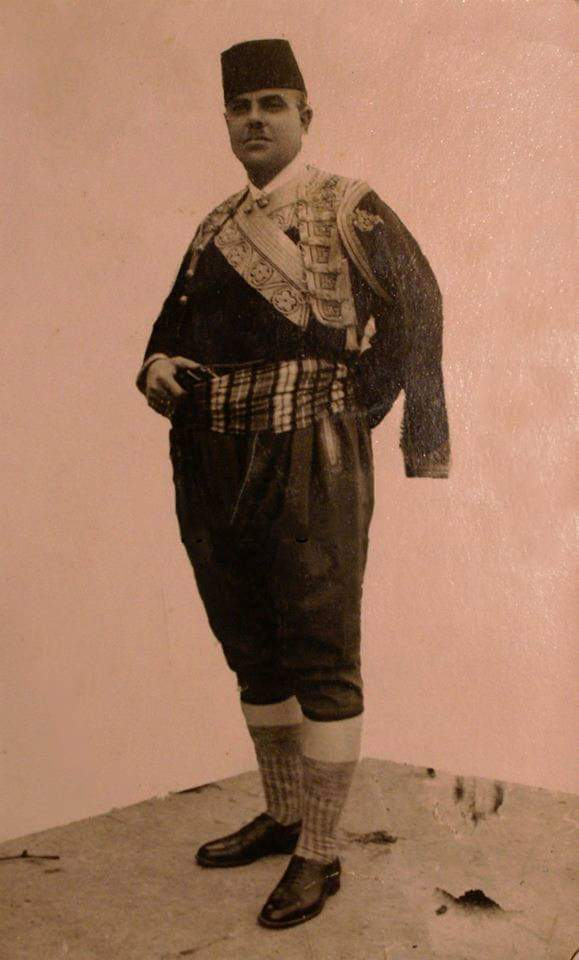
- Image of Cafo Beg Ulqini

Member of the High Regency Council of the Albanian Kingdom (1943–44)
- In office July 10, 1944 – October 25, 1944

Mayor of Ulcinj
- In office August 26, 1923 – 1943

President of the Ulqini Municipality in the Albanian Kingdom (1939-43)
- In office 1941–1943

Personal details
- Born: c. 1893 Ulcinj, Principality of Montenegro
- Died: December 25, 1977 Shkodër, Albania
- Occupation: Mayor of Ulqin, Member of the Second League of Prizren, Member of the High Council of Regency of the Albanian Kingdom
- Awards: Knight of the Order of Skanderbeg

Mustafa Osman Alibegu, OSK, (1893, Ulqin – December 25, 1977, Shkodër) known as Cafo Beg Ulqini, was a soldier, nationalist and politician. He served as the first Albanian mayor of Ulcinj for two decades, and deputy of Ulcinj in the Albanian Parliament. He was appointed as member of the High Council of Regency in 1944. On April 16, 2016, he was posthumously recognized by Albanian President, Bujar Nishani, with the title "Knight of the Order of Skanderbeg.

== Biography ==
Cafo Beg Ulqini (1893 – December 24, 1977) was an Albanian politician and activist born into the noble Alibegu family in the city of Ulcinj. His family's lineage, which can be traced back over 350 years, moved from Durres to Shkodra and eventually settled in Ulcinj in the 1690s.

Originating from ancient Illyrian roots, the Ulqinaks were renowned sailors and, at times, pirates who terrorized the Adriatic, earning the moniker "Dulcignotes" in Italian documents during the Golden Age of Albanian piracy from the 16th to the 18th centuries. Ulcinj's strategic location atop a coastal mountain made it a key node for controlling maritime trade routes.

During his early years, Cafo showed great skill in sailing. The First World War brought significant changes to the region, with the Austro-Hungarian occupation of Montenegro in 1916 leading to the occupation of Ulcinj, which had been under Montenegrin control since 1880. This occupation was welcomed by the Albanians who had suffered under Slavic rule. However, with the end of the war and the establishment of the Serbo-Croatian-Slovenian Kingdom in 1918, the situation for Albanians outside their homeland became dire, marked by persecution, exile, and ethnic cleansing.

In response to these challenges, Cafo Beg Ulqini, serving as a sailor in the Yugoslav fleet, advocated for Albanian rights and joined the People's Radical Party in 1922. He proposed that the Mayor of Ulcinj should be Albanian, a suggestion met with resistance from Montenegrin nationalists. Undeterred, Cafo Beg Ulqini became the Mayor of Ulcinj on August 26, 1923, making history as the first Albanian to lead the municipality. He served in this capacity for 20 years, focusing on the development of agriculture, livestock, trade, and tourism. However, Yugoslav policies remained discriminatory towards the Albanian population, particularly in education.

Despite these challenges, Cafo Bej Ulqini was elected as a member of the Presidency of the Islamic Municipality of Yugoslavia, a position he held until 1938. By 1927, Ulcinj had a population of 3,704 inhabitants, predominantly Albanian.

The outbreak of the Second World War brought further turmoil to the Balkans. While Yugoslavia was handed over to Hitler in April 1941, Albania was annexed by the Kingdom of Italy. During this time, Cafo successfully brought Ulcinj to the Albanian state, raising the Albanian flag for the first time on June 14, 1941.

Cafo was elected a member of the High Council of Regency of the Albanian Kingdom in 1944. As Regent of the Kingdom, throughout these tumultuous years, Cafo Beg Ulqini tirelessly worked to protect borders, national interests, and persecuted individuals, like Jews who fled persecution from the occupying Nazi forces.

Following the communist takeover on November 29, 1944, Cafo and his family lived in exile in Shkodra, while his brother Hodo Beg Ulqini, was executed by Yugoslav Partisans in Montenegro in 1948. Cafo Beg Ulqini died on December 24, 1977, at the age of 84, and was buried in Shkodra. His legacy as a champion of Albanian rights and a defender of his homeland continues to be celebrated in Albania.

== Honours ==
- Order of Skanderbeg (Albania, 26 April 2016) – decorated by President of Albania Bujar Nishani: Knight of the Order of Skanderbeg
