= European University of Tirana =

Private university in Tirana, Albania

Coordinates: 41°20′31.7″N 19°50′43.0″E

- Universiteti Europian i Tiranës
- Motto: Maiora Premunt
- Motto in English: Gjëra të mëdha na presin
- Type: Private
- Established: September 20, 2006
- Rector: Prof. Dr. Drita Kruja
- Students: 25,000
- Undergraduates: 7,500
- Postgraduates: 7,500
- Doctoral students: 750
- Location: Tirana, Albania
- Campus: Urban (three buildings)
- Colours
- Website: uet.edu.al

The European University of Tirana (Albanian: Universiteti Europian I Tiranës, UET) is an accredited private university in Tirana, Albania. It was established in 2006 by four PhD students (at the time): Adri Nurellari, Blendi Kajsiu, Ermal Hasimja, and Henri Çili, in collaboration with business manager Laert Duraj and journalist Robert Rakipllari.

UET was licensed by the Albanian Ministry of Education & Sciences on 20 September 2006 following the decision of the Council of Ministers Nr. 636/2006 and is fully accredited by the Quality Assurance Agency of Higher Education.

== Academics ==
The European University of Tirana (UET) awards Bachelor Degrees which usually take 3 years to be completed. It also offers Professional Masters, which last 1-1.5 years, and Scientific Masters, which last for 2 years. In 2011, the University acquired the right to award Doctorate Degrees in Social, Economic and Judicial Sciences.

Webometrics Ranking of World Universities, ranked UET as the 7th top Higher Education Institution in the nation.

== Organisation ==
=== Undergraduate ===
UET has three Faculties:

Faculty of Law:

- Department of General Law

Faculty of Social Sciences and Communication:

- Department of Political Science
- Department of International Relations
- Department of Public Relations
- Department of Design
- Department of Sociology & Social Anthropology
- Department of Psychology

Faculty of Economics and Information Technology:

- Department of Finance Banking
- Department of Business Management
- Department of Information Economics (Business Management)
- Department of Information Economics (Finance Banking)

=== Professional Master ===
The European University of Tirana offers about 24 Professional Masters and Master of Science programs in these fields of study: Economics, Finance, Corporate Governance, Management, Marketing, Information Economics, Public Law, International Law, Business Law, Private Law, Communication Sciences, Political Sciences, International Relations, Sociology & Social Anthropology, Psychology and Science Education. Currently there are 7 new programs of study in the process of being licensed.

Faculty of Law

- Justice

Faculty of Economics and Information Technology

- Finance
- Corporate Governing
- Marketing
- Business Management
- Applied Informatics

Faculty of Social Sciences and Education

- Public Relations
- Political Sciences
- International Relations - Diplomacy
- Teaching
- School Psychology

=== Science Master ===
The European University of Tirana offers about 24 Professional Master’s and Master of Science programs in these fields of study: Economics, Finance, Management, Marketing, Information Economics, Public Law, International Law, Business Law, Private Law, Science Communication, Political Sciences, International Relations, Sociology & Social Anthropology, Psychology and Science Education. Currently there are 7 new programs of study in the process of being licensed.

Faculty of Law

- Private and Business Law
- Criminal Law
- Public and International Law

Faculty of Economics and Information Technology

- Finance Banking
- Business Administration
- Economic Informatics

Faculty of Social Sciences and Education

- Communication – Public Relations
- Political Sciences
- International Relations
- Sociology – Social Anthropology
- Psychology
- Education Sciences

== International Collaboration ==
The European University of Tirana encourages international cooperation and the transfer of lecturers and students between partner institutions. It also has study abroad programs for one semester or one academic year with partner Universities, including Aston University, in Birmingham, UK. The two Universities intend to further their cooperation by offering joint Doctorates in the near future. UET has also signed cooperation agreements with Panthéon-Assas University, France; the University of Bari, Italy; Bar-Ilan University, Israel; the University of Montenegro, Montenegro; South East European University, Macedonia; the University of Marseille, France; and the University of Santiago, Chile.

In May 2010 EUT became a member of the Interuniversity Centre for Research and Cooperation with Eastern and South Eastern Europe (CIRCEOS), in Bari, Italy.

== See also ==
- List of universities in Albania
- List of colleges and universities
- List of colleges and universities by country
