= Gjergj Kastrioti Skënderbeu Decoration =

Albanian high honorary state decoration

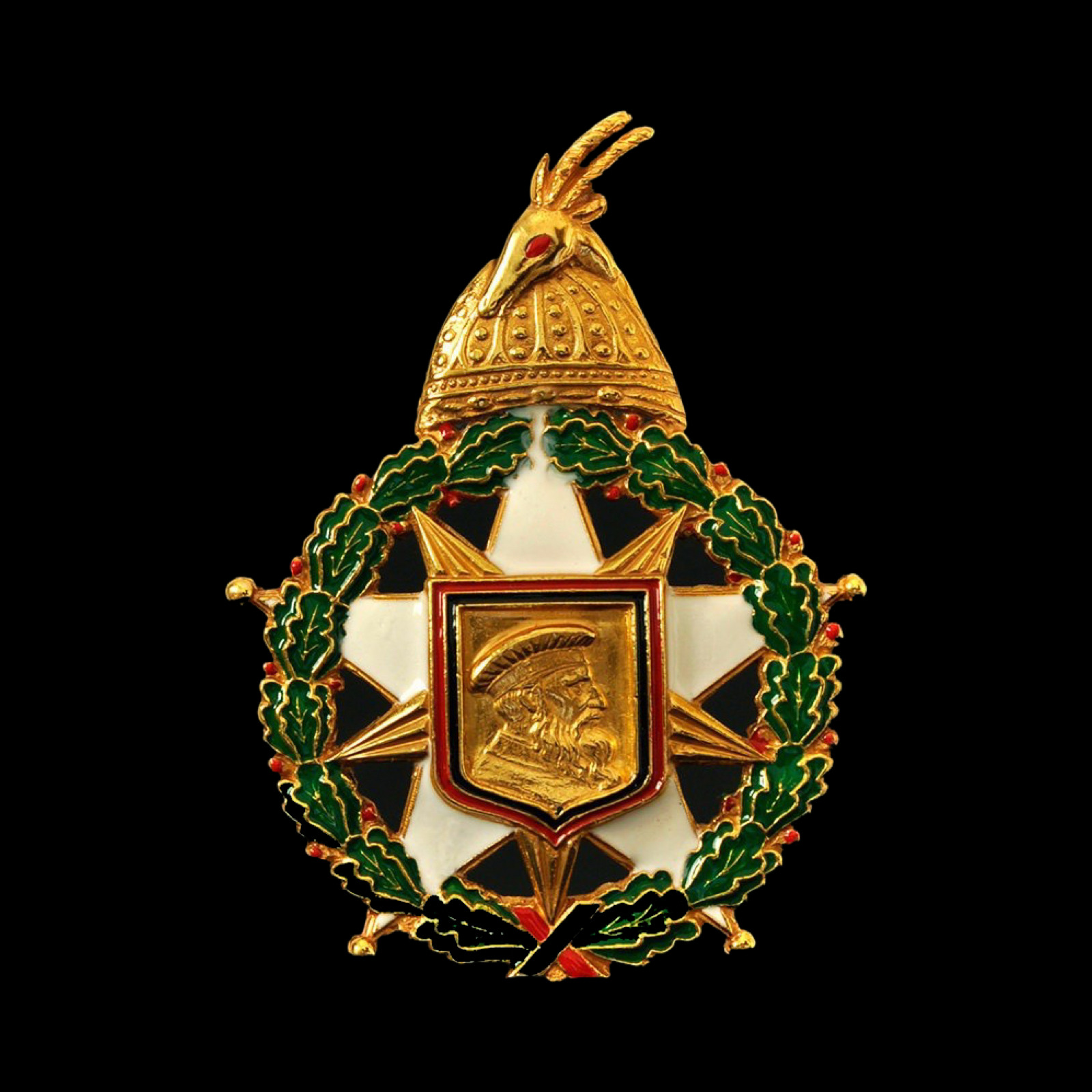

Awarded by the President of Albania
- Type: State decoration
- Eligibility: Albanians, foreign nationals
- Awarded for: Important contributions or specific heroic acts for the defense, strengthening and advancement of the Republic of Albania
- Status: Currently constituted
- Head: President of Albania

The Gjergj Kastrioti Skënderbeu Decoration (Albanian: Dekorata "Gjergj Kastrioti Skënderbeu") is a high honorary state decoration that is currently awarded to Albanian and foreign citizens in Albania, that have made an important contribution to the defence, reinforcement and development of the Republic of Albania.

The name refers to Skanderbeg, who is the national hero of the Albanian people. The Decoration is granted by the President of Albania. It should not be confused with the royal Order of Skanderbeg, which is a dynastic order bestowed by the Albanian royal family.

== Recipients ==
Some recipients to date include:

- Sabah Al-Ahmad Al-Jaber Al-Sabah, Emir of Kuwait (decorated on 27 May 2012) for his financial contribution to the reconstruction of the Skanderbeg Square.
- Anthony Bailey, Irish interfaith campaigner.
- Laura Boldrini, President of the Chamber of Deputies of Italy.
- Henry Brooke, retired British Court of Appeal judge.
- Rudolf Decker (politician, former Member of the Landtag of Baden-Württemberg, and Chair of the Vereinigung für Grundwerte und Völkerverständigung ["Foundation for Basic Values and International Understanding"] (awarded by President Bujar Nishani in June 2017).
- Rosemary DiCarlo, American diplomat.
- Yuli Edelstein, Israeli politician.
- Sabri Godo, writer, screenwriter, politician (posthumously decorated by President of Albania Bujar Nishani on 12 December 2012).
- Azem Hajdari, assassinated Albanian politician (decorated posthumously by proposal of President Bamir Topi on 10 September 2008).
- Sabri Hamiti (decorated on 10 May 2010) for the irreplaceable contribution to modern Albanian thought and for the role played in facing the historical challenges that the Albanian people faced in the late 20th century.
- Ramush Haradinaj, former Prime Minister of Kosovo.
- Hamad bin Khalifa Al Thani, Emir of Qatar (decorated by President Bamir Topi on 18 October 2011).
- Jonathan M. Moore, U.S. Diplomat, (awarded by President Bujar Nishani 28 November 2014)
- Fatos Nano, former Prime Minister of Albania (decorated by proposal of President Alfred Moisiu).
- Giorgio Napolitano, President of the Republic of Italy (2014).
- Doris Pack, German politician, President of EPP Women and former Member of the European Parliament 1989–2014.
- Colin Powell, retired US General, former Secretary of State (decorated on 1 May 2003 by proposal of President Alfred Moisiu).
- Fatmir Sejdiu, President of Kosovo (decorated by President Bamir Topi on 3 November 2008).
- Ismail Serageldin, Vice President of the World Bank (1992–2000), Emeritus Librarian of the Bibliotheca Alexandrina.
- Michael Spindelegger, Minister of Foreign Affairs of Austria (2008–2013)
- Aleksandar Stipčević, Croatian-Albanian historian and archaeologist.
- Cafo Beg Ulqini, former Mayor of Ulqin, Leader of Second League of Prizren (decorated by proposal of President Bujar Nishani in April 2016).
- Abdullah bin Zayed Al Nahyan, UAE Foreign Minister (decorated by President of Albania Bujar Nishani on 14 March 2014).
- Xhevahir Spahiu (decorated February 2020) for his contribution to the national culture.
- RAI Kalabria (decorated 21 October 2023): for their significant contribution to preserving the Arbëreshë culture and language.

== See also ==
- Orders, decorations and medals of Albania
