= Agron Shehaj =

Albanian politician and entrepreneur

Agron Shehaj MP
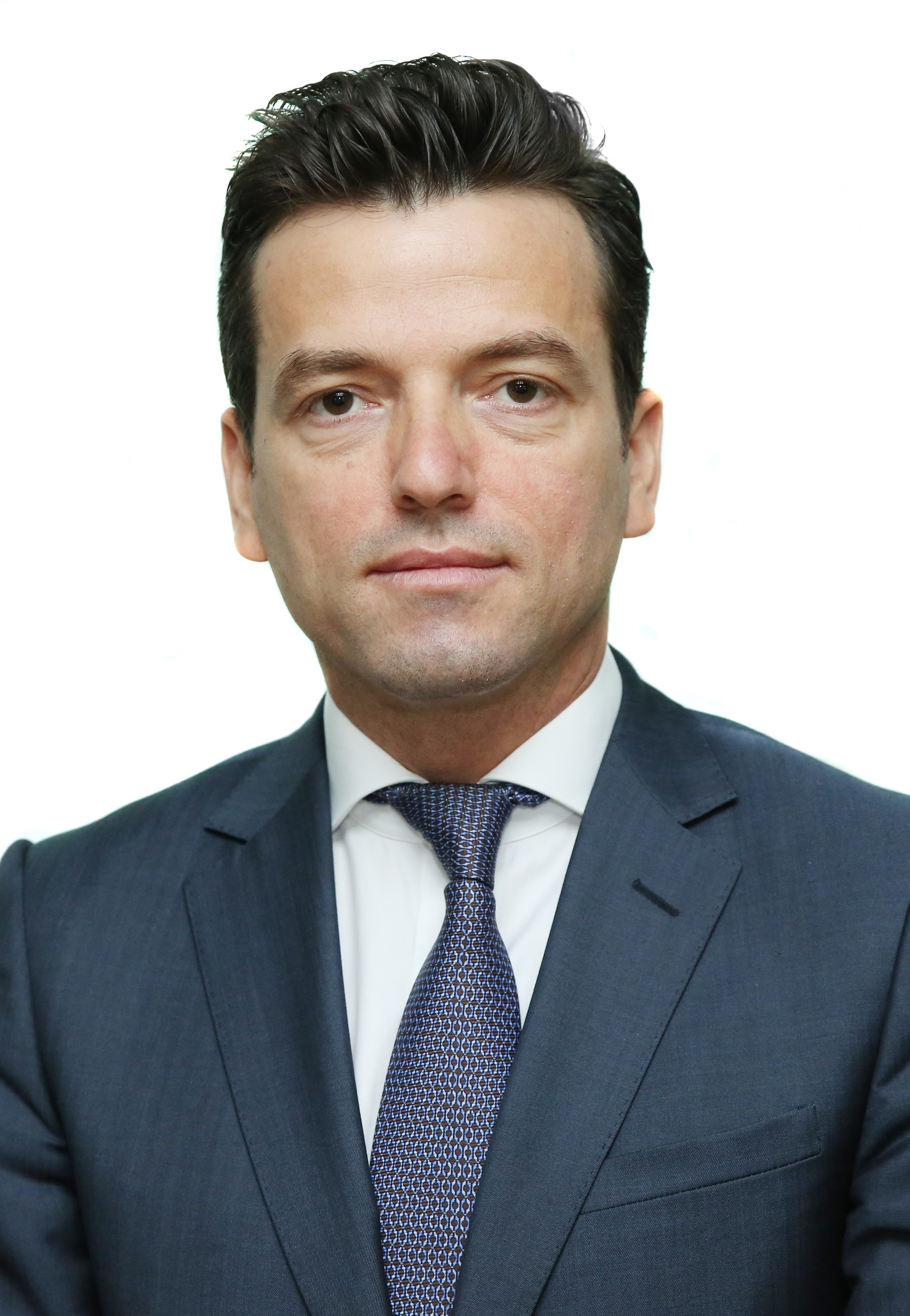
- Shehaj in 2017

Member of the Albanian Parliament
- Incumbent
- Assumed office 10 September 2021
- Constituency: Tirana County
- In office 9 September 2017 – 20 September 2019
- Constituency: Vlorë County

Leader of the Opportunity Party
- Incumbent
- Assumed office 1 June 2024

Personal details
- Born: 8 December 1977 (age 48) Vlorë, Albania
- Party: Opportunity Party
- Other political affiliations: Democratic Party (2017–2022), Independent (2022–2024)
- Education: University of Florence

Agron Shehaj (born 8 December 1977) is an Albanian entrepreneur and politician. A former MP for Democratic Party of Albania, Shehaj is the founder, leader and currently a MP for Partia Mundësia in the Albanian Parliament.

== Background ==
Agron Shehaj was born in the coastal city of Vlorë, southern Albania. He emigrated to Italy with his family in 1991. There, he completed his high school education in Bolzano and later enrolled to study economics in Florence. In 2005, he decided to return to Albania and quickly climbed the ladder of success in the field of the telemarketing business. He manages the "Sestante Holding" group of companies that operate extensively throughout Europe and North America, while being one of the largest employers in the Albanian market.

Shehaj co-founded the "Lumo Skëndo Institute of Historical Studies" along with historian Uran Butka. His Kujto.al digital archive is an initiative of the "Foundation for the Remembrance of the Victims of Communism in Albania". In Tirana, he is the main sponsor of youth football club Spartak.

== Political activity ==
Shehaj started his involvement in politics in 2017 as leader of the Democratic Party list in Vlorë. His political activism has mainly stood out in denouncing corrupt tenders, protecting the historic National Theater building and supporting people in need. He is married and has 3 children. Agron Shehaj stated he was no longer part of the Democratic Party of Albania, citing that the party won't be able to win in the upcoming elections as result of the split. He later stated that he would remain as an independent deputy in parliament and not join any group.

On 1 June 2024, he founded Opportunity Party (Partia Mundësia).

In the Albanian parliamentary elections of 2025, Partia Mundësia secured 2 MP seats, one by Agron Shehaj and the other by Erald Kapri.
