= Genc Ruli =

Albanian politician (born 1958)

Minister of Finance
- In office July 1991 – December 1991

Minister of Finance and Economy
- In office March 1992 – November 1993

Minister of Economy, Trade and Energy
- In office September 2005 – September 2009

Minister of Agriculture, Food and Consumer Protection
- In office September 2009 – September 2013

Personal details
- Party: Democratic Party of Albania
- Education: University of Tirana
- Occupation: politician
- Profession: Professor of Finance and Accounting

Genc Ruli (born April 11, 1958) is an Albanian academic, a founding member of the Albanian Democratic Party a former politician who served as finance minister in the first governments after the fall of communism in the country and a former member of Parliament.

Ruli holds a degree in economics and law from the University of Tirana. From 1983 to 2005 he taught Finance and Accounting at the Faculty of Economics at the University of Tirana. Ruli resigned from his position as finance minister on 9 November 1993, following allegations of corruption. as a result of a conflict with the president of Albania at that time, Mr. Sali Berisha. Further on, he became minister in two of Berisha's governments, from 2005 to 2013.

In 1997, Ruli established alongside Artan Hoxha the "Institute of Contemporary Studies", one of the most important think tanks in Albania. Ruli has been engaged in many national and international activities, with well-known organizations and institutions. He has hold various positions, such as chairman of the supervisory board of the Insurance Institute (INSIG); chairman of the Parliamentary Commission of Economy and Finance; EBRD Governor for Albania; member and vice president of the Albanian Olympic Committee etc. Ruli has written several publications in the areas of economics and public policies.
