= Albanian Copyright Office =

Zyra Shqiptare për të Drejtat e Autorit
- Official logo

Copyright office overview
- Jurisdiction: Albania
- Headquarters: Tirana
- Copyright office executive: Evien Dako, Director
- Website: www.zshda.gov.al

The Albanian Copyright Office (ZSHDA) (Albanian: Zyra Shqiptare për të Drejtat e Autorit) is a state-run public entity under the supervision of the Ministry of Culture (Albania).

ZSHDA carries out its activities in support of and in implementation of the Constitution, the Albanian copyright law and other related rights in other applicable legal and sub legal acts, as well as in other international conventions and agreements where the Republic of Albania participates in.

It is tasked to oversee and monitor the respected and protected rights and all related rights of subjects, legal persons, private or public, authors of literary, artistic and scientific works, etc.

The office examines and registers any application for copyright and rights registration from the applicant, author or title of copyright in a work. It deposits all submissions, registrations, and copyright changes which are kept as electronic documents recorded in the database that is managed by the Copyright Register.
