= Copyright law of Albania =

Copyright Law: 2016, Albania

Law No. 35/2016 "On the Rights of the Author and Other Rights Related to" was approved by the Albanian Parliament on 31 March 2016. The purpose of the law is to guarantee the protection of the author's copyrights and other related rights.

== Summary ==
The subject matter of copyrighted work shall be any original intellectual creation in the literary, artistic and scientific domain, having an individual character, irrespective of the manner and form of its expression, its type, value or purpose, unless otherwise provided for in this law.

Works of Copyright subjected to protection shall be in particular:

I. works of speech expressed through literary and journalistic texts, lectures, religious sermons (written or oral works, and computer programs);
II. dramatic works
III. musical works with or without words;
IV. choreographic works and works of pantomime;
V. audiovisual works including cinematographic works and other works of visual arts, and works created in a manner similar to cinematographic creation; radio works;
VI. works of fine arts in the field of painting, sculpture, and graphics, monumental decorative arts, irrespective of the material/component they are made of, and other visual art works
VII. works of architecture, including drawings, plans, sketches of small scale and graphic creations in architectural projects;
VIII. photographic works and works produced by a process similar to photography;
IX. works of applied art except for those of industrial design that are under the law of industrial property;
X. cartographic works; three-dimensional presentation, illustrations, charts, maps and drawings in the field of topography, geography and of science in general;
XI. presentations of a scientific or technical nature whether stated orally or in writing such as presentations, monographs, deductions, dissertations, studies, university lectures, textbooks, scientific projects and documents, drawings, plans, sketches, tables, etc.

The protections of the author's rights are specifically mentioned in Article 58 of the Constitution of Albania

== See also ==
- Albanian Copyright Office
- General Directorate of Industrial Property
