= Opportunity Party (Albania) =

Opportunity Party Partia Mundësia
- Abbreviation: MUNDËSIA
- Leader: Agron Shehaj
- Founder: Agron Shehaj
- Founded: 1 June 2024
- Split from: Democratic Party of Albania
- Ideology: Conservatism; Economic liberalism; Pro-Europeanism
- Political position: Centre-right to right-wing
- Colours: Blue; Orange
- National Assembly: 2 / 140
- Municipality: 0 / 61

Party flag
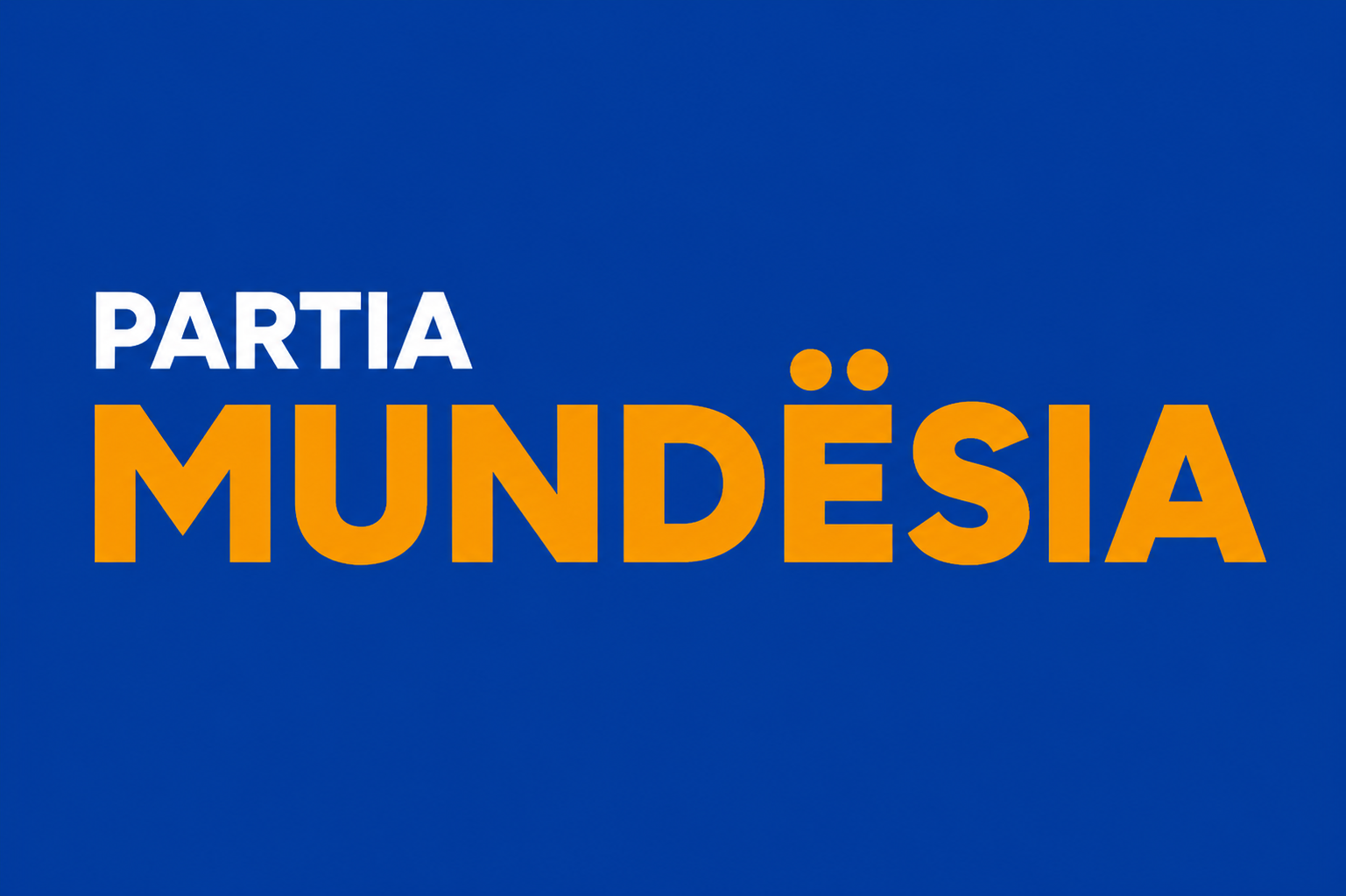

Website
- mundesia.al

The Opportunity Party (Albanian: Partia Mundësia, MUNDËSIA) is a centre-right political party in Albania. Its leader is Agron Shehaj.

In the 2025 general elections, the party secured 2 parliamentary seats, one with Agron Shehaj, and the other with Erald Kapri.

== History ==
Agron Shehaj, a former member of the Berisha's faction in the Democratic Party, left the party and announced on 1 June 2024 the establishment of a new political subject in Albania called Opportunity Party (Partia Mundësia).

The inauguration of the party took place at the Palace of Congresses in Tirana, where Shehaj expressed the party's vision of rejuvenating hope among Albanians and positioning itself as a European-style political force actively engaged in grassroots activities.

In his address, Shehaj underscored the party's commitment to providing a fresh start for all citizens. He further emphasized that this nascent political movement represents a departure from the political landscape of the past three decades in Albania, offering a distinct alternative to traditional paradigms.

== Ideology and Platform ==
The MUNDËSIA's political positions have been described as centre-right to right-wing, fiscally conservative, and moderate conservative. The positions are considered similar to the Democratic Party of Albania, but with more neoliberal policies.

=== Economic Policies ===
The party advocates for a replacement of the current progressive income tax with a 8% flat tax rate. The party aims to cut the administration costs by 1 billion euros in year. According to the party, this would be achieved through reduction of bureaucracy, strict spending checks and an end to employment favoritism. They believe that through the spending review, Albania would be able to have a flat tax and increase investments in healthcare and education sectors by 500 million euros. The party wants a removal of state control checks in new enterprises in their first 3 years, a breakdown of monopolies and automatization of customs with artificial intelligence. The party also proposes a cancellation of abusive concessions and public-private partnerships. The party aims to freeze fiscal policies for 10 years and proposes the adaptation of the euro as national currency. Further economic reforms by the party are implementation of AI for planning permissions. During the 2025 Albanian parliamentary election campaign, Shehaj proposed an 80% budget cut for Albania’s national television RTSH, citing low viewership and high maintenance costs.

== Election results ==
=== Parliamentary elections ===
Election	Leader	Votes	%	Seats	+/–	Government
2025	Agron Shehaj	48,995	3.05	2 / 140	New	Opposition

== See also ==
- List of political parties in Albania
