= Mitrovica Government =

Government of Albania during the German occupation (1943–1944)

- 34th Government of Albania
- November 1943–June 1944
- Date formed: 5 November 1943
- Date dissolved: 16 June 1944

People and organisations
- Head of State: High Regency Council
- Prime Minister: Rexhep Mitrovica
- No. of ministers: 11

History
- Predecessor: Interim Executive Committee
- Successor: Dine Government

The Mitrovica Government (Albanian: Qeveria e Rexhep Mitrovicës) was the 34th ruling government of Albania, in office from 5 November 1943 to 16 June 1944, during the period of German occupation of Albania in World War II. It was headed by Rexhep Mitrovica, a nationalist politician and intellectual from Kosovo.

The government was formed following the collapse of Italian control in Albania and operated under German military presence. While formally independent, its authority was limited by wartime conditions and the influence of occupying forces. The Mitrovica Government sought to maintain internal order, oppose communist resistance, and preserve Albanian territorial integrity, particularly regarding Kosovo, which had been incorporated into Albania during the war.

Political instability, increasing partisan activity, and internal disagreements weakened the cabinet. Rexhep Mitrovica resigned in June 1944 due to health issues and political pressure, leading to the formation of a successor government under Fiqiri Dine and later Ibrahim Biçakçiu.

== Cabinet ==
Mitrovica Government
Rexhep Mitrovica – Prime Minister; acting Minister of Popular Culture and Foreign Affairs
Xhaferr Deva – Minister of Internal Affairs
Mehmet Konica / Bahri Omari – Minister of Foreign Affairs
Musa Gjylbegu – Minister of Public Works
Eqerem Çabej / Koço Muka – Minister of Education
Ago Agaj – Minister of National Economy
Sokrat Dodbiba – Minister of Finance
Rrok Kolaj – Minister of Justice; acting Minister of Education
Kolë Tramara – Minister of Popular Culture
Vehbi Frashëri – Deputy Minister of Foreign Affairs
Qazim Bllaca – Deputy Minister of National Economy

== See also ==
- Politics of Albania
- World War II in Albania
- German occupation of Albania
- Rexhep Mitrovica
- High Regency Council (Albania)
