= General Directorate of Taxation (Albania) =

Government agency of Albania

- Drejtoria e Përgjithshme e Tatimeve
- General Directorate of Taxation

Revenue agency overview
- Jurisdiction: Albania
- Headquarters: Tirana
- Revenue agency executive: Ilir Binaj
- Website: www.tatime.gov.al

The General Directorate of Taxation (DPT; Albanian: Drejtoria e Përgjithshme e Tatimeve) is a revenue collection agency of the Albanian Government.

Its function is to collect tax revenues, uniformly applying tax legislation to finance the Albanian state budget. To achieve these goals, the Directorate assists taxpayers with services so they can fulfill their own tax obligations under the applicable legislation.

The administration is tasked to monitor, evaluate and penalize any conduct by the taxpayer who does not enforce or deliberately misappropriate the fulfillment of their legal obligations.

== See also ==
- Taxation in Albania
