= General Directorate of Industrial Property (Albania) =

Government agency of Albania

- Drejtoria e Përgjithshme e Pronësisë Industriale
- Official logo

Patents agency overview
- Jurisdiction: Albania
- Headquarters: Tirana
- Patents agency executive: Ledina Beqiraj Agalliu, Director General
- Website: dppi.gov.al

The General Directorate of Industrial Property (DPPI; Albanian: Drejtoria e Përgjithshme e Pronësisë Industriale) is a public agency of the Albanian national government. It is in the Ministry of Economic Development, Tourism, Trade and Enterprise. The activity of this institution is regulated by Law 9947 dated. 07/07/2008 "On Industrial Property". This institution grants protections for objects of Industrial Property: Inventions and usage patterns, Industrial design, Commercial and Service Marks, etc.

== See also ==
- Copyright law of Albania
- Driving licence in Albania
