= Official Publishing Center (Albania) =

- Qendra e Botimeve Zyrtare

Publication agency overview
- Formed: 30 June 1999; 27 years ago
- Jurisdiction: Ministry of Justice
- Headquarters: Tirana, Albania
- Website: qbz.gov.al

The Official Publishing Center (Albanian: Qendra e Botimeve Zyrtare – QBZ) is an institution of the Albanian government under the direct supervision of the Ministry of Justice. It is responsible for publishing the Official Journal, the Bulletin of Official News and for updating and maintaining the Electronic Archive of Acts and other publications, pursuant to the law "On the organization and functioning of the Official Publishing Center".

QBZ is responsible for the publication of acts, printed publications of updated codes and summaries of legislation (by topic), the safekeeping and non-publication of data, laws and other acts, until they are published in the official journal or the official announcement bulletin.
