= Ndoc Çoba =

Albanian economist, publicist and politician

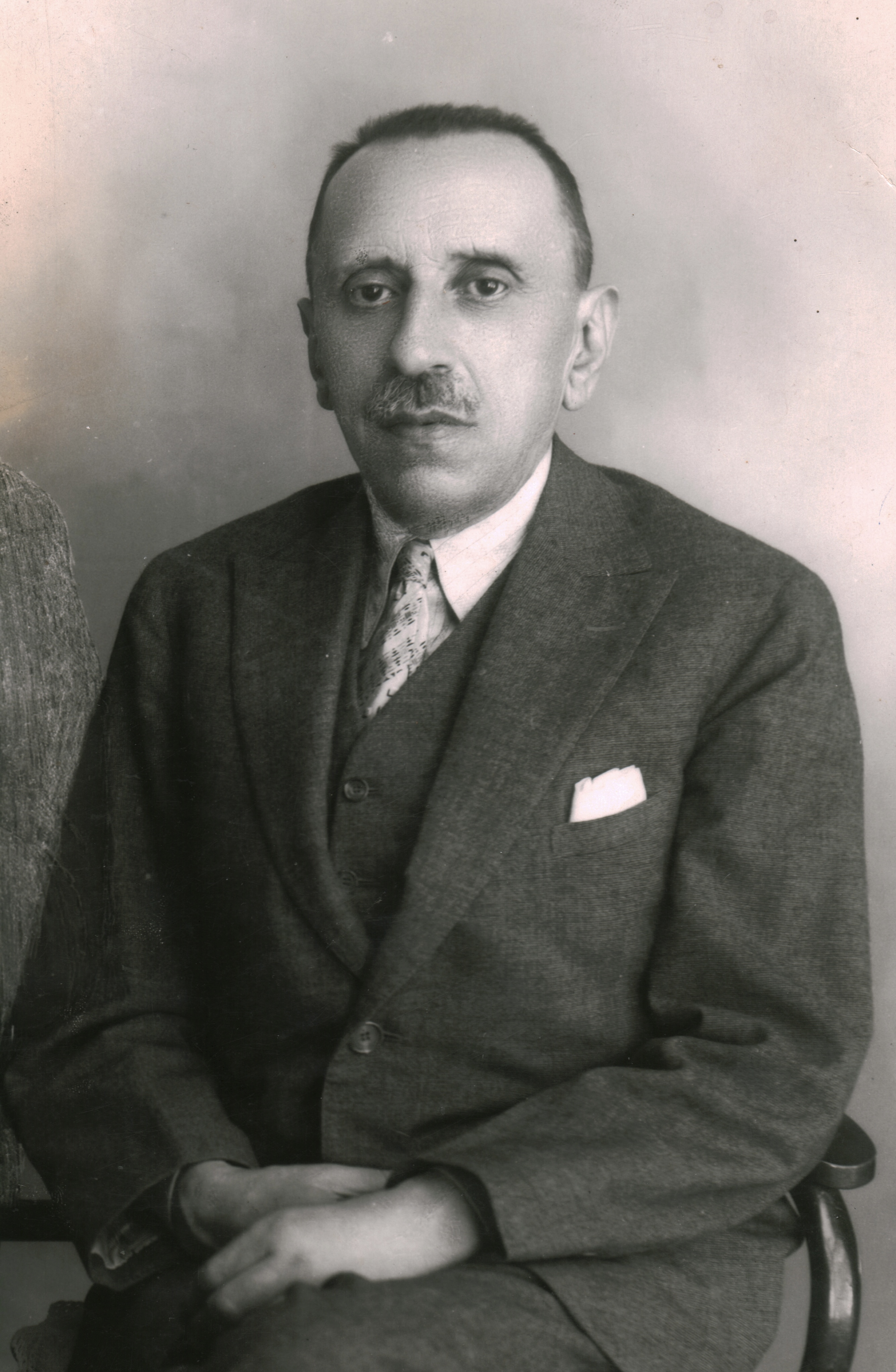

7th Finance Minister of Albania
- In office 30 January 1920 – 14 November 1920
- Preceded by: Fejzi Alizoti
- Succeeded by: Tef Curani

Personal details
- Born: July 27, 1870 Shkodër, Ottoman Albania
- Died: March 6, 1945 (aged 74)

Ndoc Çoba (27 July 1870 – 6 March 1945) was an Albanian economist, publicist and politician who served as Minister of Finances in the Delvina Government.

== Biography ==
Ndoc Çoba was born on July 27, 1870, in Shkodër, Albania then Ottoman Empire. After completing his high school education at the Saverian College in his hometown, he attended the Faculty of Economics in Venice where he met his future wife, Shaqe Shiroka. By 1908, he was a member of the "Gjuha Shqipe" club which was founded by Kel Marubi. In 1913, he was named director of customs in Shkodër. From 1914 to 1915 he served as a member of the commission for the administration of Shkodër. Çoba participated at the Congress of Durrës in 1918 and that of Lushnjë in 1920. Shortly after, he joined the cabinet of Sulejman Delvina as Minister of Finances. From August 27, 1937, until June 24, 1939, he served as mayor of Shkodër Municipality. He was elected meeting chairman of the Peza Conference on September 16, 1942. Two months later, Çoba was captured by fascist authorities and interned to the island of Ventotene. Following the Italian capitulation in the war, he returned to Albania and became actively involved in the Legality Movement which was formed after the meeting that took place on November 21, 1943, in Herr, outside Tirana. In January 1945, he was arrested by the communists and charged as a Nazi collaborator. He died on March 6, 1945, after three months of torture.
