= Erald Kapri =

Albanian politician (born 1987)

Member of the Albanian Parliament
- Incumbent
- Assumed office 12 September 2025

Personal details
- Born: May 14, 1987 (age 39) Pogradec, PR Albania
- Party: Opportunity Party
- Education: University of Westminster; University of Tirana

Erald Kapri is an Albanian journalist, professor and politician who was elected as an MP for Opportunity Party the 2025 Albanian parliamentary elections.
