= Taxation in Albania =

In Albania, taxes are levied by both national and local governments. Most important revenue sources, include the income tax, social security, corporate tax and the value added tax, which are all applied on the national level. The Albanian Taxation Office is the revenue service of Albania.

As of 2014, income tax is progressive, with three brackets.

Monthly income	Tax rate
In between 0 L and 30000 L	0%
In between 30000 L and 150000 L	13%
In excess of 150000 L	23%

Earlier, Albania had a flat tax of 10%, which was implemented in 2008. Value-Added Tax is levied at two different rates of 20% as standard rate, and 10% on medicinal products.

Social security and health insurance contributions are paid on employment, civil and management income. Contributions is paid on a monthly income, from a minimum of 22,000 to a maximum amount of 95,130. The employees contribution is 9.5% while the employer pays 15%. Health insurance is levied at 1.7% for both employee and employer. The self-employed pay 23% for social security and 7% for health insurance.

Corporate tax in Albania is levied at a flat rate of 15%. Businesses with a turnover of less than 8 million is exempt from corporate tax. A business is tax resident when the company has been incorporated in Albania or has a permanent establishment or the management and control is exercised in Albania.
