= Qarkore =

Albanian government statement

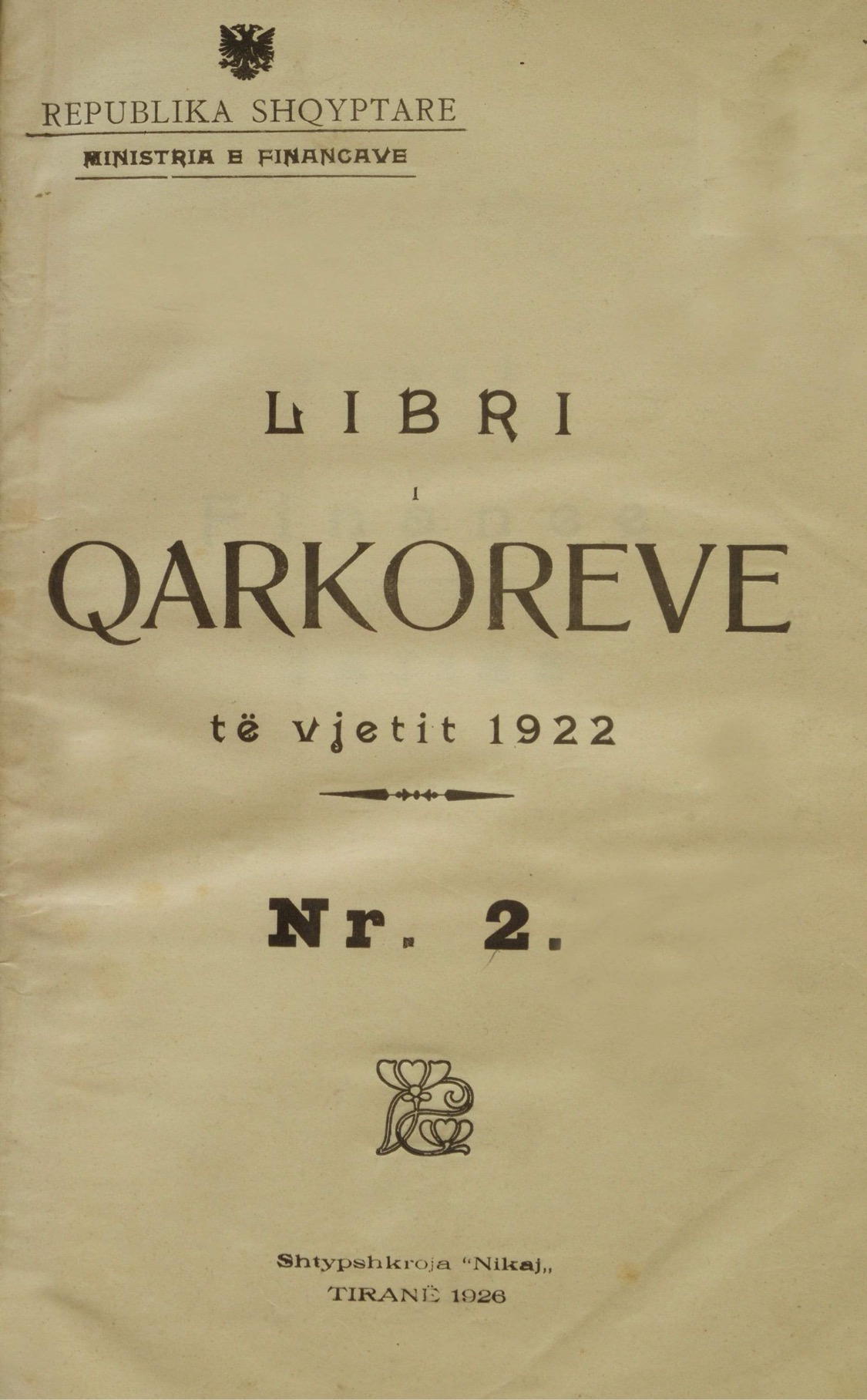
- The book of Qarkore dating from 1922
- Created: 1920
- Location: Albania
- Commissioned by: Council of Ministers
- Author: Departament Press Office
- Signatories: Government official
- Media type: Print, Digital
- Subject: Administrative
- Purpose: To convey orders and instructions to lower-level government officials on how to handle sensitive data and other state information.

Qarkore (lit. 'Circular') was an official state document of the Albanian government, used in the form of a directive by a higher government official or entity containing an important order, instruction or notification and sent equally to all lower entities and subordinates. The qarkore was seen as a necessary means of communication between all levels of government when ethics in the usage of state information, official order and proper bureaucracy were lacking.

== Design layout ==
The earliest cover letters of a qarkore showed on the left side of the header the country's official name, the department responsible for sending it and the registered number. On the right side is printed the location and date. Slightly below it, we see the word "Qarkore" followed by the receiving subordinate underlined.

The letter is split into two parts. The top part contains detailed instructions, displaying the occupation and name of the official writing it.

The bottom part, which is separated by a line strike, displays the name of the subordinate, number, location and date partially in roman numerals. It further expands the above given instructions and is finalized with the official seal and signature of the lower-level official receiving it.

Qarkores are still in use today in Albania. Government institutions refer to them as urdhër (order) and udhëzim (instruction). In their original name, qarkores are used mostly by religious and non-profit organizations. In neighbouring Kosovo, a similar document called Qarkore Informative (lit. Informative Circular) is used to instruct and inform the administration and other public institutions.
