= Sulejman Starova (politician) =

Albanian economist

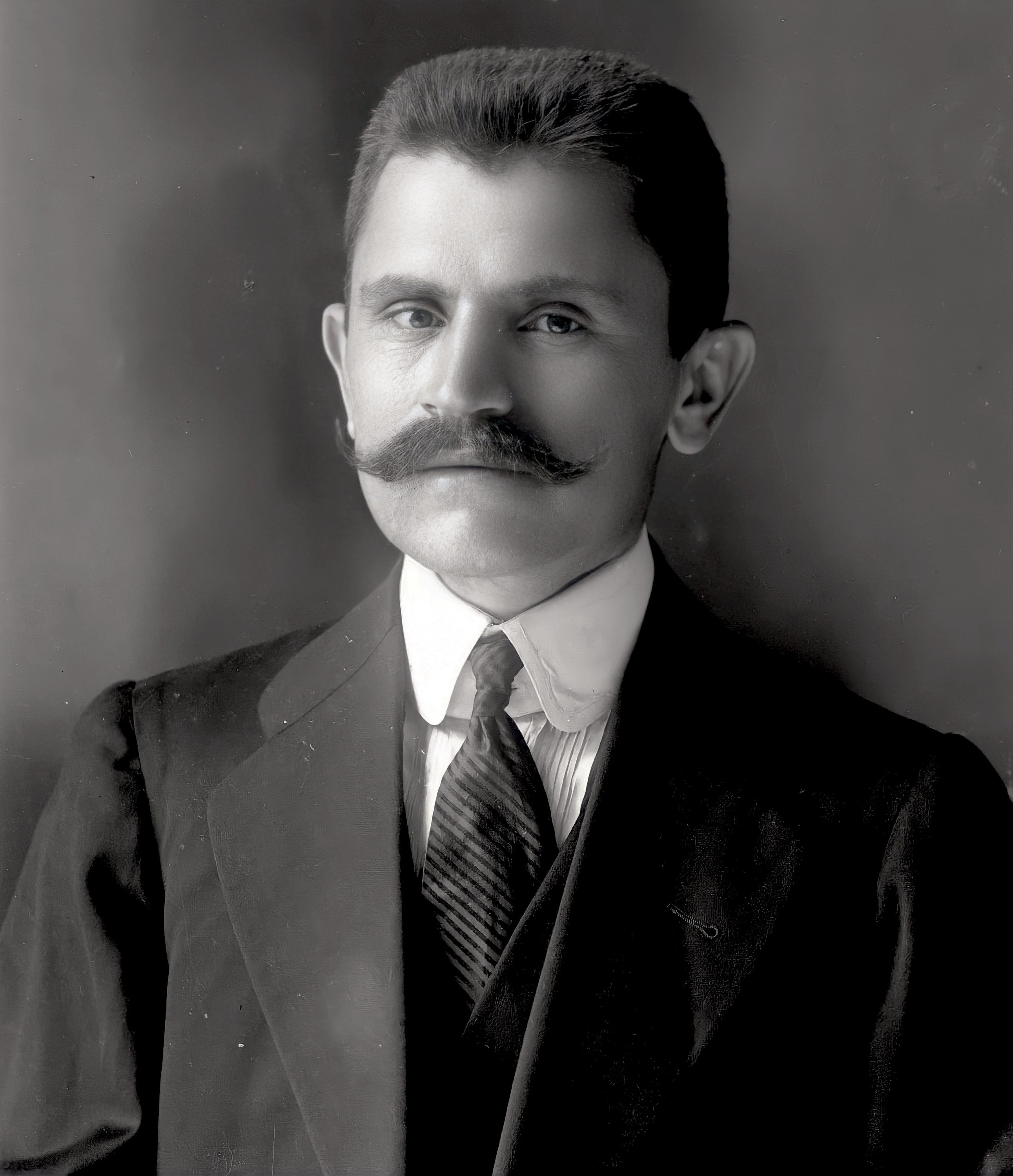

10th Finance Minister of Albania
- In office 12 December 1921 – 24 December 1921
- Preceded by: Ahmed Dakli
- Succeeded by: Kol thaçi
- In office 28 September 1925 – 10 February 1927
- Preceded by: Mufid Libohova
- Succeeded by: Fejzi Alizoti
- In office 24 October 1927 – 10 May 1928
- Preceded by: Fejzi Alizoti
- Succeeded by: Milto Tutulani

Personal details
- Born: 1874 Starovë, Pogradec, Ottoman Albania
- Died: 1 July 1934 (aged 59–60) Korçë, Albanian Kingdom

Sulejman Starova (Starovë, 1874 – Korçë, 1 July 1934) was an Albanian financier and politician who served as Minister of Finances on three separate terms during the 1920s. For his contribution to the national cause, he was awarded posthumously the title "Honorary Citizen" of the local municipality of Buçimas.

== Biography ==
Sulejman Starova was born in the village of Starovë, present-day Pogradec municipality. He received his early education in his hometown and in Bitola, later transferring to Istanbul where he would complete his higher studies in finance. Here he worked as a banker until the end of 1912. With the mediation of the French legation, he managed to return home to Albania.

From 1913 to 1920 he worked as a finance officer in the Albanian administration. In 1920 he was employed as an advisor at the Ministry of Finances and the following year was given the portfolio of Minister of Finances in the transitional government of Idhomen Kosturi.

In December 1923 he ran as a deputy representing the Prefecture of Korçë in the Albanian Parliament and was re-elected again in 1925 and 1928. During this time, he was reappointed Minister of Finances in the Republican governments unofficially led by justice minister Milto Tutulani from 28 September 1925 to 10 February 1927 and substitutive justice minister Ilias Vrioni from 24 October 1927 to 10 May 1928.

Sulejman Starova died on July 1, 1934, from tuberculosis.
