= Fejzi Alizoti =

Interim prime minister of Albania (1874–1945)

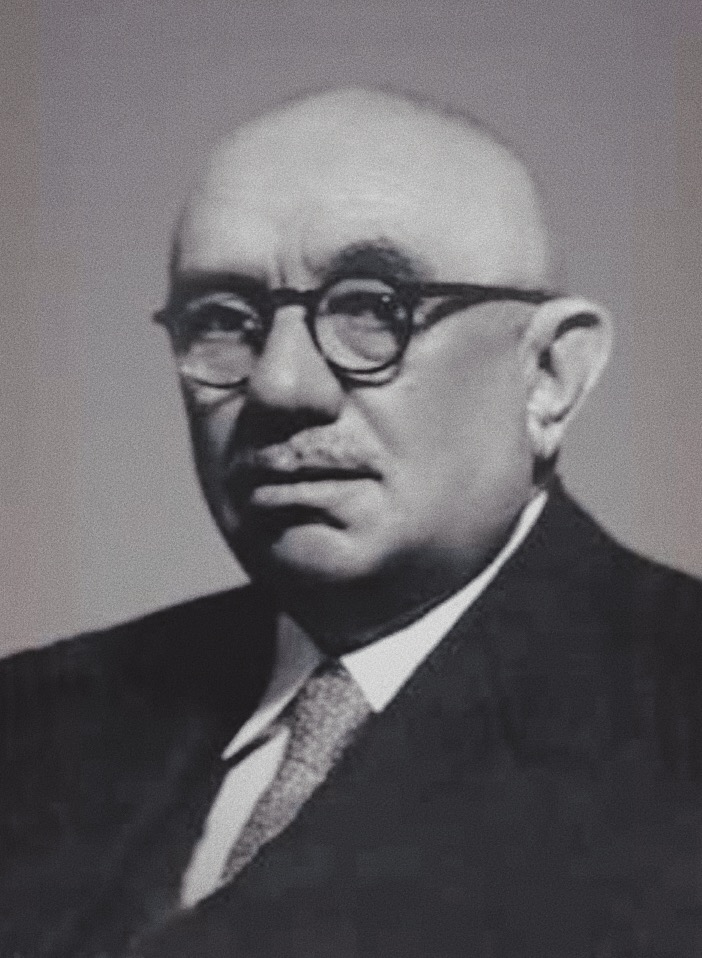
- Alizoti, 1920s

Chairman of the Central Administration
- In office January 1916 – October 1918
- Preceded by: Ismail Kemal (as head of state)
- Succeeded by: Turhan Përmeti

Personal details
- Born: September 22, 1874^{[a]} Gjirokastër, Ottoman Empire (modern Albania)
- Died: April 14, 1945 (aged 70) near Tirana, Albania
- Cause of death: Execution
- Spouse: Ismihan Koka Alizoti
- Relations: Alizot Pasha (Great Grandfather)
- Children: Hasan Alizoti (Son); Fitret Alizoti Pashallari (Daughter); Belkiz Alizoti Mborja (Daughter); Safet Alizoti (Daughter); Riza Alizoti (Son)
- Parent: Hasan Bey Alizoti (Father)
- Profession: Politician, economist, administrative clerk

Fejzi Bey Alizoti (22 September 1874,^{[a]} Gjirokastër – 14 April 1945, Tirana) was an Albanian politician who served as the chairman of the central administration of Albania from January 1916 to October 1918. He was the first interim prime minister of Albania.

== Life ==
Alizoti was born in Gjirokastër, back then Ottoman Empire in a powerful family. His great-grandfather was Alizot Pasha who had ruled for a very short time (1787) the Vilayet of Yannina after the death of Ahmet Kurt Pasha. His father Hasan Bey Alizoti was a local bey. At the age of 8, Alizoti was sent to study in Ioannina. After that he finished the Classic Gymnasium of Salonika in 1890 and return to Gjirokastër. After that he left for Istanbul, where he studied at Mekteb-i Mülkiye economics and civic administration. After the graduation he was sent in Syria where he worked as part of the Ottoman administration for 3 years. After succeeding the first assignment he was appointed Prefect of Homs in the Tripoli Eyalet, and later in the Bilecik province. In 1906 he wrote to the High Porte asking to be transferred somewhere in the Albanian areas. With the intervention of some friends of him in the capital, he was transferred as Prefect of Korçë. After the Young Turk Revolution and the new constitution he was sent Prefect in Prizren, Vilayet of Kosovo until March 1910 when the unrest in Albanian Vilayets would increase following with the Albanian rebellions. Alizoti was recalled to Istanbul and sent to Romania for a specialization course. After 6 months he returned and started as Administrator of Urfa in Asia Minor, and after that as Governor of Al-Khums in Western Libya.

According to Elsie, the Italians arrested him during the Italo-Turkish War for Libya and interned in a camp in Italy. There he would become one of the greatest Italophiles in Albanian history staying a loyal supporter of Italian interests. According to Albanian sources, he was recalled from the Ottoman authorities and sent as Administrator in the Dodecanese islands. After that, with the start of the Albanian Revolt of 1912, the Ottoman authorities sent him together with Abdyl Ypi as a best-fit "mediator" to calm down the Albanian rebels of the Labëria region who had already gathered an Assembly in Cepo, near Gjirokastër, and aligned their demands with the rebels in the north. The attempts were unsuccessful even though Ypi and Alizoti managed to organize a meeting with rebel leaders in Tepelenë on August 18. Ismail Kemal wrote to Alizoti and asked to join him in Vlorë after the Declaration of Independence.

For a short time in 1914 Alizoti was the 2nd Prime Minister under the auspices of the International Commission of Control. Under Prince Wied he served as secretary-general of the Ministry of the Interior, and Prefect of Shkodra, investigating Albanian officers who were suspected to have taken part in the Islamic Revolt. He strongly opposed Essad Toptani and his parallel government in Durrës. During World War I he worked with Austrian occupation forces as Financial Director of the Civilian Administration Council set up by August Ritter von Kral (1869–1953).

Alizoti was Minister of Finances of Albania in 1918–1920. He was one of the prominent members of the Congress of Durrës. Later in 1920 he would take an opponent stance towards the Congress of Lushnjë, which replaced the pro-Italian government of Durrës with a new one, establishing the territorial sovereignty of Albania. According to Sejfi Vllamasi's (1883–1975) memories, Alizoti, together with Mustafa Merlika-Kruja, Myfit Libohova, and Sami Bey Vrioni would try to prohibit the delegates for joining the Lushnje event. Ahmet Zogu would call him a "traitor" for that. After the attempts failed, Alizoti escaped shortly to Corfu avoiding any reaction from the congress supporters.

During the June Revolution of 1924 he supported Ahmet Zogu, who needed him because of his good relations with the Italians. After Zogu's rise in power Alizoti took part in various negotiations between Albania and Italy, always siding with Italy to the detriment of Albanian interests, to the extent that he was called the "kavass of the Italians". From February to October 1927 he was Minister of Finance and shortly substituting his ally and friend Iliaz Vrioni. He played a major role in the proclamation of the Albanian Monarchy in 1928. Alizoti proposed that Zog was called not only "King of Albania" but "King of the Albanians" including so even the Albanian population outside the borders. During the Italian occupation he served again as Minister of Finances in Shefqet Vërlaci's government from April 12, 1939, to 1940.

== Death and legacy ==
Arrested on April 14, 1945, by the Communists, under direct orders from the Communist regime's Special Court, he was sentenced to death by a firing squad. His family would be persecuted. During the Communist era, he would be recalled as "traitor, collaborationist, feudal, corrupt, and Italian agent".

His son Riza Alizoti (1915–1947) was arrested and accused of being a spy and a saboteur of the petroleum fields of Kuçovë with a group of other engineers known as "Saboteurs group" (Albanian: Grupi i sabotatorëve). He was executed on 10 October 1947 by hanging.

A special reference would be made during the Communist era to one Alizoti's famous sayings regarding higher education ("...there is intellectual overproduction in Albania"), considering that 80-85% of the Albanians were illiterate.

== See also ==
- History of Albania

== Notes and references ==
Notes

a.	Albanian sources place the year of birth as 1868 or 1876, while Elsie 1874 or 1876. Mostly 1874 is more probable since Albanian sources accept as well that he finished high school in 1890.

Political offices
Preceded by Ismail Kemal	Interim Prime Minister of Albania; January 22, 1914–March 7, 1914	Succeeded by Turhan Përmeti
