= All-Albanian Congress =

1912 meeting creating the Albanian Provisional Government

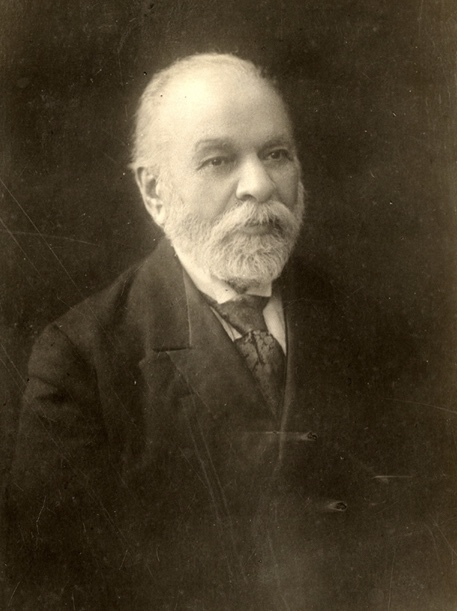
Ismail Kemal, the prime initiator of the Congress.

The All-Albanian Congress (Albanian: Kongresi Gjithë Shqipëtar) was held in Vlorë (then Ottoman Empire, today Republic of Albania) on November 28, 1912. The Congress's participants constituted the Assembly of Vlorë which established Albanian Provisional Government and elected Ismail Kemal as its president.

== Background ==
The success of the Albanian Revolt of 1912 sent a strong signal to the neighboring countries that the Ottoman Empire was weak. The Kingdom of Serbia opposed the plan for an Albanian Vilayet, preferring a partition of the European territory of the Ottoman Empire among the four Balkan allies. Balkan allies planned the partition of the European territory of the Ottoman Empire among them and in the meantime the conquered territory was agreed to have status of the Condominium.

The combined armies of the Balkan allies overcame the numerically inferior and strategically disadvantaged Ottoman armies, and achieved rapid success. As a result of their success, almost all remaining European territories of the Ottoman Empire were captured by Balkan allies, which destroyed the plans for Albanian autonomy and independence. About two weeks before the congress was held, Albanian leaders appealed to Franz Joseph, Emperor of Austria-Hungary, explaining the difficult situation in their country divided into four vilayets occupied by Balkan allies. Austria-Hungary and Italy strongly opposed the arrival of Serbian army on the Adriatic Sea because they perceived it as treat to their domination of the Adriatic and feared that a Serbian port on the Adriatic could become a Russian base.

== The sitting of the congress ==
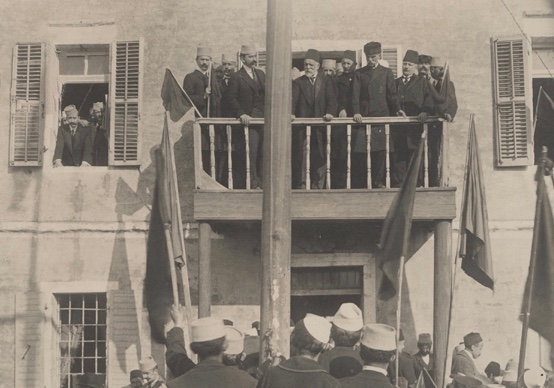
Ismail Kemal and his cabinet during the celebration of the first anniversary of independence in Vlorë on 28 November 1913.

When Ismail Kemal came to Albania on the third week of November 1912, he discussed the future of the Albanian people with the participants present at the congress. Although there was consensus for complete independence, there was also approval for continued friendly relations with the Ottoman Empire. Therefore, they sent telegrams to the Ottoman Western army, the Vardar army and to Ioannina fortress pledging continued support for the war against the Christian states.

On November 28, 1912, the congress' first sitting was held in the house of Xhemil bey in Vlorë. Kemal invited Albanians from all four vilayets (Kosovo, Scutari, Monastir and Janina) within the projected Albanian Vilayet to attend the congress. At the beginning of the session, Ismail Kemal took the floor and, referring to the threats to the rights Albanians had gained through successful revolts since 1908, proclaimed to the delegates that they should do anything necessary to save Albania.

=== Present participants of the congress ===
After Kemal's speech they began by reviewing delegates' credentials. The delegates were as follows:

- Berat: Ilias Vrioni, Hajredin Cakrani, Xhelal Koprëncka, Babë Dud Karbunara, Dhimitër Tutulani, Sami Vrioni (still awaited);
- Dibër: Vehbi Dibra, Sherif Langu;
- Durrës: Abaz Çelkupa, Mustafa Hanxhiu, Jahja Ballhysa, Nikoll Kaçorri;
- Elbasan: Lef Nosi, Shefqet Dajiu, Qemal Karaosmani, Dervish Biçaku; Mid'hat Frashëri;
- Gjirokastër (by telegram): Elmas Boçe, Veli Harçi, Azis Efendi Gjirokastra
- Pejë (Gjakovë, Plavë and Guci): Rexhep Mitrovica, Bedri Pejani and Salih Gjuka
- Krujë: Abdi Toptani, Mustafa Merlika-Kruja
- Lushnjë: Qemal Mullaj, Ferid Vokopola, Nebi Sefa;
- Ohër and Strugë: Zyhdi Ohri, Myrteza Ali Struga and Nuri Sojliu
- Shijak: Xhemal Deliallisi, Ymer Deliallisi, Ibrahim Efendiu;
- Tirana: Abdi Toptani, Murad Toptani;
- Vlorë: Ismail Kemal, Zihni Abaz Kanina, Aristidh Ruçi, Qazim Kokoshi, Jani Minga, Eqrem Vlora;
- Albanian colony of Bucharest: Dhimitër Zografi, Dhimitër Mborja, Dhimitër Beratti and Dhimitër Ilo

=== Missing participants of the congress ===
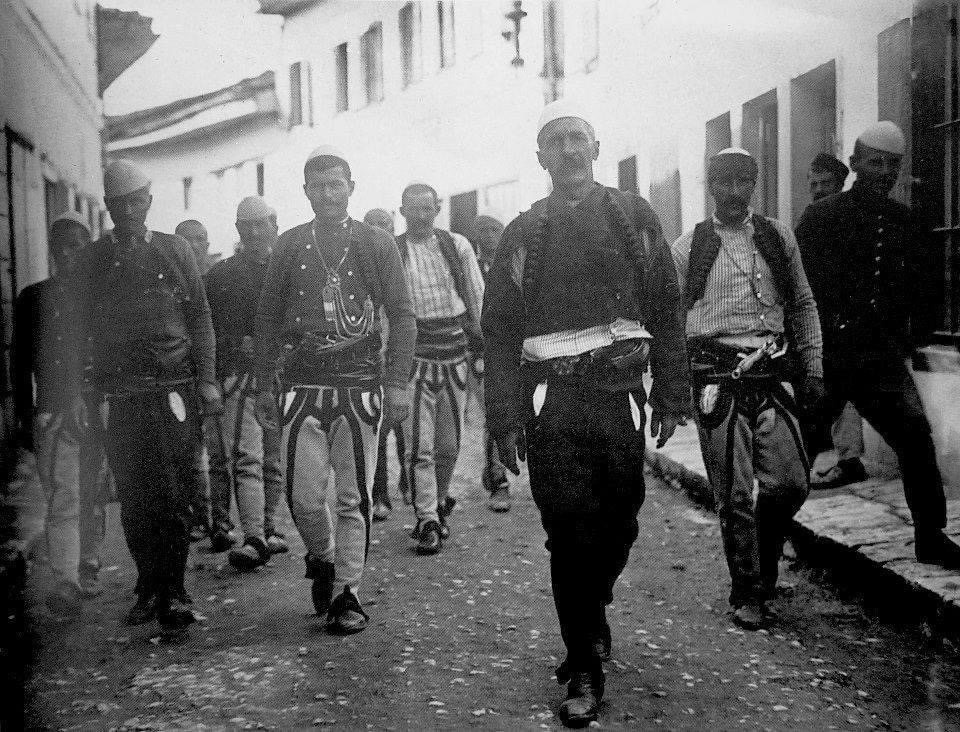
Isa Boletini and his men from Kosovo Vilayet in the streets of Vlorë after the Independence was already proclaimed.

Albanians from several provinces had not yet reached Vlora when it was decided to start the first session of the congress. Ismail Kemal refused to wait for Isa Boletini and other Albanians from Kosovo Vilayet and hastily made the Albanian declaration of independence. The southern elite wanted to prevent Boletini's plans to assert himself as a key political figure and used him to suit their military needs.

Since Korça, Shkodra, Përmet, Ohrid and Struga were surrounded by the armies that prevented some Albanians from those provinces to come to Vlorë, other Albanians from those towns were recognised as representatives of those towns. Their names are:

- Korça: Pandeli Cale, Thanas Floqi, Spiridon Ilo,
- Shkodra: Luigj Gurakuqi
- Përmet: Veli Këlcyra, Mid'hat Frashëri;
- Ohrid and Struga: Hamdi Ohri and Mustafa Baruti

Rest of the missing participants of the congress that were late to attend its session and were not replaced by other Albanians are:

- Çamëria: Veli Gërra, Jakup Veseli, Rexhep Demi, Azis Tahir Ajdonati;
- Delvina: Avni Bey Delvina;
- Gramsh-Tomorricë: Ismail Qemali Gramshi (not to be confused with Ismail bej Qemal Vlora);
- Janina: Kristo Meksi, Aristidh Ruçi;
- Kosova, Gjakova, Plav-Gusinje: Mehmet Pashë Deralla, Isa Boletini, Riza Bey Gjakova, Ajdin Draga, Dervish Ipeku, Zenel Begolli, Qerim Begolli;
- Peqin: Mahmud Efendi Kaziu;
- Pogradeci: Hajdar Blloshmi;
- Skrapar: Xhelal Koprëncka; Hajredin Cakrani;
- Tepelene: Fehim Mezhgorani;

== Constitution of the Assembly of Vlorë ==
After the documents were checked, Ismail Kemal again took the floor and held a speech stating that he believes that the only way to prevent the division of the territory of the Albanian Vilayet between the Balkan allies is to separate it from the Ottoman Empire. Kemal's proposal was unanimously accepted and it was decided to constitute the Assembly of Vlorë (Albanian: Kuvendi i Vlorës) and to sign the declaration of independence of Albania. By signing the declaration of Albanian independence the present deputies of the Assembly of Vlorë rejected the autonomy granted by the Ottoman Empire to the Albanian Vilayet, projected a couple of months earlier. The consensus was made for the complete independence.

The sitting was then suspended and members of newly constituted National Assembly went to the house of Ismail Kemal and raised the flag of Skanderbeg on the balcony of his house, in front of the gathered people.

== Aftermath ==
The members of the newly constituted National Assembly returned from the balcony of Kemal's house and started the sitting of Assembly. They established the Provisional Government of Albania with Ismail Kemal as President who was given the mandate to establish the Cabinet on the session of the Assembly of Vlorë held on December 4, 1912.

== See also ==
- Albanian Revolt of 1912
- Albanian Vilayet
- First Balkan War
- Assembly of Vlorë
