= List of Albanians in North Macedonia =

This is a list of Albanians in North Macedonia that includes both Macedonian people of Albanian descent and Albanian immigrants that have resided in Macedonia. The list is sorted by the fields or occupations in which the notable individual has maintained the most influence.

For inclusion in this list, each individual must have a Wikipedia article and show that they are Albanian and have lived in Macedonia.

== History, politics and military ==
=== Middle ages ===
- Arianiti family – Albanian noble family, lord of Debar
- Gropa family – Albanian noble family, lord of Ohrid
- Kastrioti family – Albanian noble family, lord of Kastrioti
- Moisi Golemi – Albanian nobleman and a commander of the League of Lezhë

=== Ottoman period ===
- Ahmed Izzet Pasha – Grand Vizier
- Arabacı Ali Pasha – Ottoman grand vizier from 1691 to 1692
- Konda Bimbaša – mercenary
- George Ghica – Prince of Moldavia and Wallachia
- Köprülü Mehmed Pasha – Grand Vizier. Founder of the Köprülü political dynasty of the Ottoman Empire
- Mehmet Akif Pasha – Albanian-Ottoman statesman and governor of the Ottoman Empire
- Ohrili Hüseyin Pasha – Grand Vizier
- Patrona Halil – was the instigator of a mob uprising in 1730 which replaced Sultan Ahmed III with Mahmud I and ended the Tulip period

=== Albanian Renaissance ===
- Ali Shefqet Shkupi – lieutenant colonel, First Chief of Supreme Staff of the Albanian Army.
- Cen Elezi - Albanian nationalist figure and guerrilla fighter
- Cen Leka – revolutionary and nationalist. fought in the Albanian Revolt of 1844
- Dervish Cara – revolutionary and nationalist. A leader in the Albanian Revolt of 1844
- Elez Isufi – Albanian nationalist figure and guerrilla fighter
- Zyhdi Ohri - lawyer. One of the signatories of the Albanian Declaration of Independence
- Hamdi Ohri - politician, One of the delegates of the Albanian Declaration of Independence
- Mustafa Baruti – politician, One of the signatories of the Albanian Declaration of Independence
- Mehmet Pashë Dërralla – military general, One of the delegates of the Albanian Declaration of Independence
- Dervish Hima – publisher, One of the signatories of the Albanian Declaration of Independence
- Nuri Sojliu – politician, One of the signatories of the Albanian Declaration of Independence
- Tajar Tetova – military commander and activist of the Albanian national awakening

=== Young Turk Revolution & Turkish War of Independence ===
- Ahmed Niyazi Bey – politician, Adjutant Major, revolutionary and an instigator of the Young Turk Revolution (1908)
- Eyüp Sabri Akgöl – Ottoman-Albanian revolutionary and one of the leaders of the Young Turk Revolution
- Hayrullah Fişek – General in the Ottoman army, Undersecretary of State, Ministry of National Defence
- Kâzım Özalp – Turkish military officer, politician, and one of the leading figures in the Turkish War of Independence.

=== Post Albanian Independence to the end of World War II ===
- Gajur Deralla – World War II collaborator of Balli Kombëtar
- Hafëz Jusuf Azemi – World War II collaborator of Balli Kombëtar
- Mefail Shehu – World War II collaborator of Balli Kombëtar
- Nexhmije Hoxha – First Lady of Communist Albania
- Rexhep Jusufi – World War II collaborator of Balli Kombëtar
- Sulë Hotla – World War II collaborator of Balli Kombëtar
- Xhem Hasa – World War II collaborator of Balli Kombëtar

=== Break up of Yugoslavia ===
- Agim Krasniqi – Albanian National Army commander
- Alajdin Demiri – mayor, activist in the Unrest in Gostivar and Tetovo (1997)
- Nazmi Sulejmani - commander of the NLA.
- Arbën Xhaferi – politician, Albanian rights activist
- Gëzim Ostreni – military general, commanded the KLA and NLA. Recipient of The Presidential Medal of Merits (Kosovo)
- Ismet Jashari – KLA soldier and recipient of the Hero of Kosovo
- Jakup Asipi – military commander, commanded the 114th Brigade of the NLA
- Nevzat Halili – Albanian rights activist and organiser of the Republic of Ilirida movement
- Talat Xhaferi – Parliamentary speaker of the Republic of Macedonia, former commander of the 116th Brigade of the NLA
- Xhezair Shaqiri – KLA and NLA commander

=== Modern period ===
- Ali Ahmeti – politician, leader of the Democratic Union for Integration
- Blerim Reka – politician, Minister of European Integration of Kosovo in North Macedonia
- Branko Manoilovski – politician of Albanian Orthodox descent
- Bujar Osmani – politician, Minister of Foreign Affairs of North Macedonia
- Fatmir Besimi – politician, Minister of Finance of North Macedonia
- Lazar Elenovski – politician, Minister of Defence of Macedonia
- Menduh Thaçi – Leader of the Democratic Party of Albanians
- Ogerta Manastirliu – Minister of Health and Social Care of Albania
- Zana Ramadani – German politician and feminist activist

== Science and academia ==
- Bajazid Doda – Albanian ethnographic writer and photographer
- Ferid Murad – Medical Researcher, Recipient of the 1998 Nobel Prize in Physiology or Medicine.
- Gjergj Qiriazi – writer, One of the founders of the Albanian printing press Bashkimi i Kombit
- Ibrahim Temo – doctor, One of the founders of the Society for the Publication of Albanian Writings
- Mehmet Gega – educator, and Albanian rights activist in Yugoslavia
- Myrteza Ali Struga doctor, One of the signatories of the Albanian Declaration of Independence
- Parashqevi Qiriazi – educator. Chairwoman of the Congress of Manastir
- Petro Janura – Personality of the Albanian language, literature, and folklore in Yugoslavia
- Sehadete Mekuli – physician and Albanian rights activist in Yugoslavia
- Sevasti Qiriazi – educator, Pioneer of Albanian female education
- Tajar Zavalani – Albanian historian, publicist, and writer

== Arts and entertainment ==
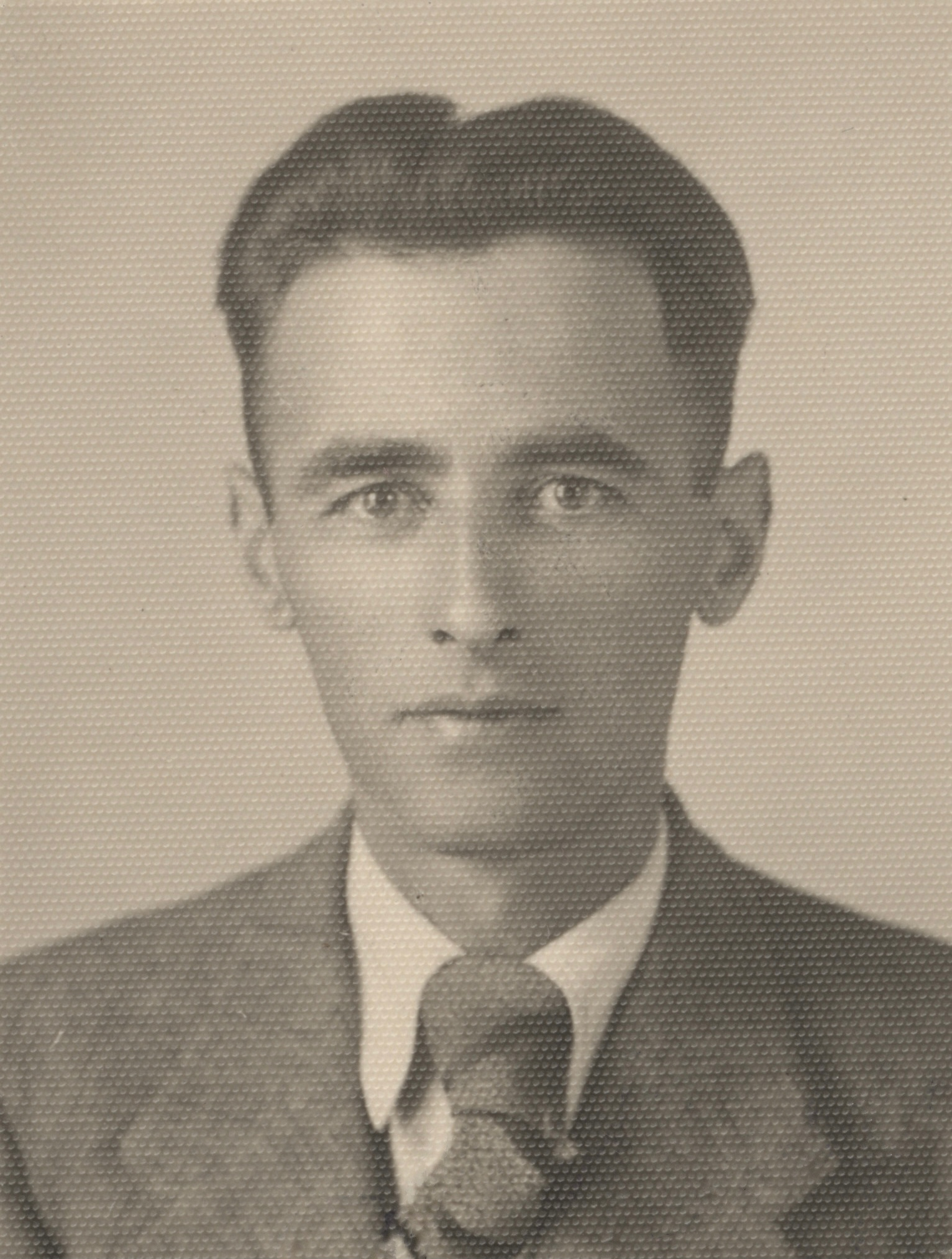
Abdurrahim Buza was a celebrated 20th century painter.

- Abdurrahim Buza – painter
- Adrian Gaxha – singer, Participant in the 2008 Eurovision Song Contest
- Arif Şentürk – folk music singer
- Avni Qahili – journalist
- Bardhi – rapper
- Bebe Rexha - singer, songwriter
- Blerim Destani – actor

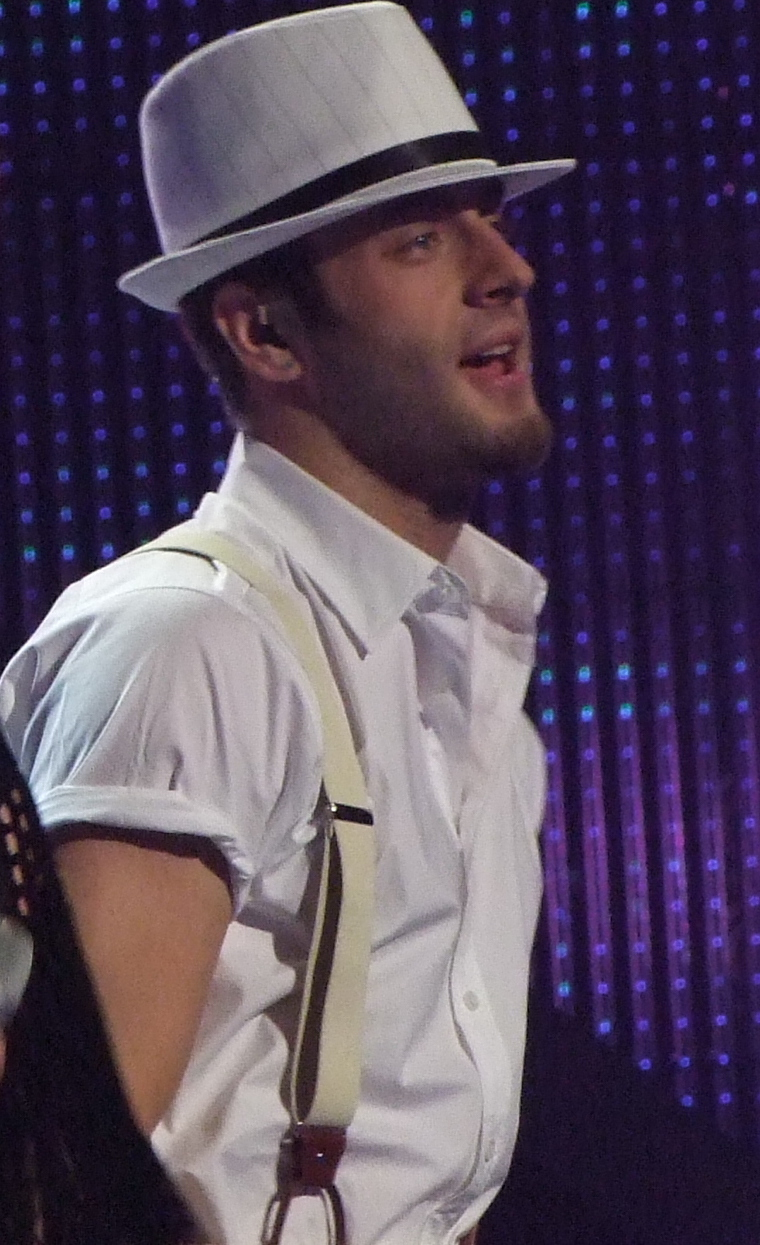
Adrian Gaxha represented Macedonia at the Eurovision Song Contest 2008.

- Can Yaman - Turkish actor and model
- Candan Erçetin - singer-songwriter
- Çiljeta – Albanian pop singer and model
- Elita 5 – rock music group
- Kanita – singer
- Lindon Berisha – singer, songwriter
- Lorenc Antoni – composer, conductor, and ethnomusicologist
- Mateja Matevski – poet,
- Melis Sezen - Turkish actress and model
- Mimoza Veliu – photographer
- Omer Kaleshi – Painter
- René Redzepi – Danish chef and co-owner of the three-Michelin star restaurant Noma
- Rıza Tevfik Bölükbaşı – Turkish philosopher, poet, politician of liberal signature and a community leader
- Sabri Berkel – Painter
- Sabri Kalkandelen – poet, chief of the Istanbul Imperial Library
- Shkëlzen Baftiari – pianist
- Shpat Kasapi – singer
- Tolgahan Sayışman – actor and model
- Tony Dovolani – professional ballroom dancer and instructor
- Tuna – singer
- Venera Lumani – singer
- Zagorka Shuke (née Kanefçe born 14 July 1914 – 17 January 2000) was an Albanian film, stage and theater actress, best known for her performance in the 1972 film"Kapedani". She was born in Ohrid

== Sports ==
=== Footballers ===
Note: Only players that have been capped at international level

- Admir Mehmedi – footballer, Switzerland national team
- Afrodita Salihi – footballer, North Macedonia national team
- Agim Ibraimi – footballer, North Macedonia national team
- Agon Elezi – footballer, North Macedonia national team
- Ardian Cuculi – footballer, North Macedonia national team
- Ardon Jashari – footballer, Switzerland national team
- Arijan Ademi – footballer, North Macedonia national team
- Armend Alimi – footballer, Macedonia national team
- Artim Šakiri – footballer, Macedonia national team
- Bajram Fetai – footballer, Macedonia national team
- Berat Sadik – footballer, Finland national team
- Besart Abdurahimi – footballer, Macedonia national team
- Besart Ibraimi – footballer, North Macedonia national team
- Besir Demiri – footballer, Macedonia national team
- Blerim Džemaili – footballer, Switzerland national team
- Enis Bardhi – footballer, North Macedonia national team
- Enis Fazlagikj – footballer, North Macedonia national team
- Ertan Demiri – footballer, Macedonia national team
- Ezgjan Alioski – footballer, North Macedonia national team
- Ferhan Hasani – footballer, North Macedonia national team
- Gentjana Rochi – footballer, North Macedonia national team
- Hakan Şükür – footballer, Turkey national team
- Hava Mustafa – footballer, North Macedonia national team
- Ilir Elmazovski – footballer, Macedonia national team
- Jasir Asani – footballer, Albania national team
- Leonard Zuta – footballer, Macedonia national team
- Lindon Selahi – footballer, Albania national team
- Muhamed Demiri – footballer, Macedonia national team
- Muzafer Ejupi – footballer, Macedonia national team
- Naser Aliji – footballer, Albania national team
- Nedim Bajrami – footballer, Albania national team
- Nijaz Lena – footballer, Macedonia national team
- Pajtim Kasami – footballer, Switzerland national team
- Riza Durmisi – footballer, Denmark national team
- Sedat Berisha – footballer, Macedonia national team
- Shkodran Mustafi – footballer, Germany national team
- Taulant Seferi – footballer, Albania national team
- Valon Ahmedi – footballer, Albania national team
- Valon Ethemi – footballer, North Macedonia national team
- Visar Musliu – footballer, North Macedonia national team
- Xhelil Abdulla – footballer, Macedonia national team
- Zekirija Ramadani – footballer, Macedonia national team

=== Martial arts ===
- Abdula Memedi – wrestler, Competed in the 1980 Summer Olympics
- Arbresha Rexhepi – judoka, Competed in the 2020 Summer Olympic
- Enver Idrizi – karateka, Silver medalist in the 1994 World Championships
- Mirdi Limani – kickboxer, WKA World Championship
- Nuri Seferi – boxer, Former WBO European Cruiserweight Champion
- Safer Sali – wrestler, Competed in the 1972 Summer Olympics
- Sefer Seferi – boxer
- Shaban Sejdiu – wrestler, Olympic and World Championship medalist
- Shaban Tërstena – wrestler. Olympic gold medalist and World Championship medalist

=== Others ===
- Dardan Dehari – alpine ski racer
- Drita Islami – hurdler, Competed in the 2016 Summer Olympic
- Lirim Zendeli – formula 2 racer
- Mirjeta Bajramoska – handballer

== Religion ==
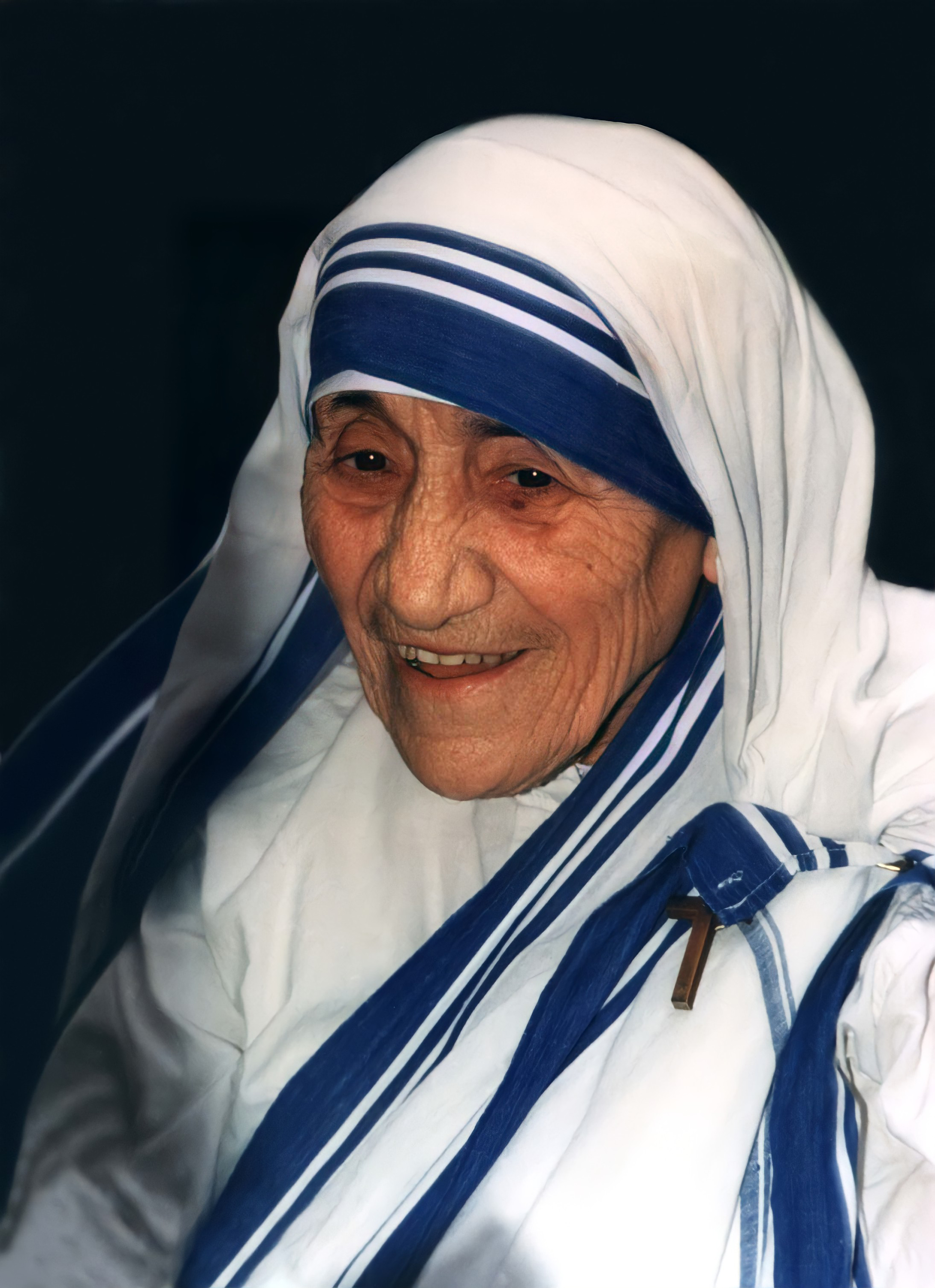
Mother Teresa was a catholic nun and saint, known for her work to helping the poor.

- Gjerasim Qiriazi – educator. The founder of the Protestant Church of Albania which opened on 15 October 1891.
- Mother Teresa – nun. Recipient of the 1979 Nobel Peace Prize
- Mustafa Ruhi Efendi – religious (Naqshbandi) and political leader. President of the Central Committee of the League of Prizren
- Sherif Langu – imam, One of the delegates of the Albanian Declaration of Independence
- Vehbi Dibra – politician and theologist. One of the signatories of the Albanian Declaration of Independence and the first Grand Mufti of Albania
