= Elderly Assembly =

The Elderly Assembly (Albanian: Pleqënia) was a senate of Albania which independence was declared on 28 November 1912 in Vlorë (then Ottoman Empire, today Republic of Albania). The senate was established on the 4 December 1912 by the Assembly of Vlorë. It was composed of 18 members of the assembly and had advisory role to the government of Albania.

All provinces of the independent Albania were represented by its members in the senate:

- Kosovo: Salih Gjuka, Bedri Pejani, Hajdin bej Draga,
- Monastir: Vehbi Dibra
- Shkodër: Hajredin bej Cakrani, Shefqet bej Daiu, Dervish Biçaku, Xhelal bej Koprencka, Mustafa Merlika-Kruja, Murat bej Toptani,
- Janina: Babë Dud Karbunara, Veli Këlcyra, Kristo Meksi, Eqerem bej Vlora, Ilias Bey Vrioni, Sami Bey Vrioni,
- Albanian colony of Bucharest: Dhimitër Zografi, Dhimitër Berati
