= Abaz Çelkupa =

Albanian politician

Abaz Dilaver Çelkupa or Abaz Efendi Çelkupa (Durrës 1850–1926 Durrës) was an Albanian politician and one of the delegates and signatories of the Albanian Declaration of Independence in 1912. He was among the key activists of the Albanian National Awakening.

== Career ==
=== Early life and Ottoman service ===
Born in the city of Durrës in the Sanjak of Scutari, and educated as a youth in the city's kuttab, Çelkupa spent a number of years working within the Ottoman administration of the city and also served as the treasurer at the port's customs.

=== Albanian independence activist ===
Alongside other Albanian patriots from and working in Durrës, including Dom Nikollë Kaçorri, Neki Libohova, Sotir Veveçka, and Jahja Ballhysa, Çelkupa participated in and even helped in founding political societies concerned with pushing the usage of the Albanian language across schools in Ottoman Albania, as well as other efforts opposing the oppressive Young Turk administration and seeking to further Albanian interests. Examples of those societies being Vllaznia (founded in 1907) and Bashkimi (founded in 1909), in which Abaz held a senior key position. While he clearly advocated for the teaching of Albanian in schools, it seems as if he believed that the Albanian language should be written in the Arabic script, as writing in the Latin script would go against the iman and practices of Islam. Abaz Çelkupa also maintained relations and communications with the Albanian diaspora, particularly with the politicized diaspora in Bucharest, Romania, which had been publishing the Drita magazine series, one of the first magazines in Albanian. Çelkupa aided in organizing and supporting the various anti-Ottoman uprisings (e.g. the revolts of 1910 and 1912) that took place across central and northern Albania, such as those in Kurbin, Kruja and Mati. In August 1912, Abaz and a few other patriots met with Zef Harapi, accompanied by a few Albanian beys and 100 highlanders from Malësia, near Shënavlash to discuss the liberation of Durrës. In the same year he accompanied Ismail Qemali and the other activists to Vlora as a representative for Durrës at the All-Albanian Congress, where the Albanian state was finally declared independent, signing his name on the declaration as Abas Dilaver. With the withdrawal of Serb forces from Durrës in the following year he, alongside Kristaq Rama, Dom Nikollë Kaçorri, Seid Kërtusha, and Ismail Myderrizi, were sent as delegates from Durrës to Kruja in order to negotiate with Essad Pasha Toptani. However, the delegates left following their discovery that Toptani had plans to secede from Independent Albania and form his own state, the Republic of Central Albania, which would maintain close relations with the Ottoman government in Istanbul and the powers of the Balkan League (particularly the Kingdom of Serbia).

=== Exile ===
As a result of his opposition to Toptani and the defeat of Prince Wilhelm of Wied by the pro-Ottoman Albanian rebels under Haxhi Qamili, Çelkupa and his family were forced to flee Durrës where their house and riches were plundered. They temporarily settled in Ulcinj, Montenegro, and eventually relocated to Shkodër where Abaz was able to reach out to other patriots such as Luigj Gurakuqi. From Shkodër he settled in Kruja. Çelkupa would eventually return and die in his birthplace.

== Multilingualism ==
On top of his native Albanian, Çelkupa was fluent in Italian and French, and was also most likely proficient in both Ottoman Turkish and Arabic as a result of his history working in the Ottoman administration and education in the Islamic schooling system.
