= Albanian Declaration of Independence =

Declaration of independence of Albania from the Ottoman Empire in 1912

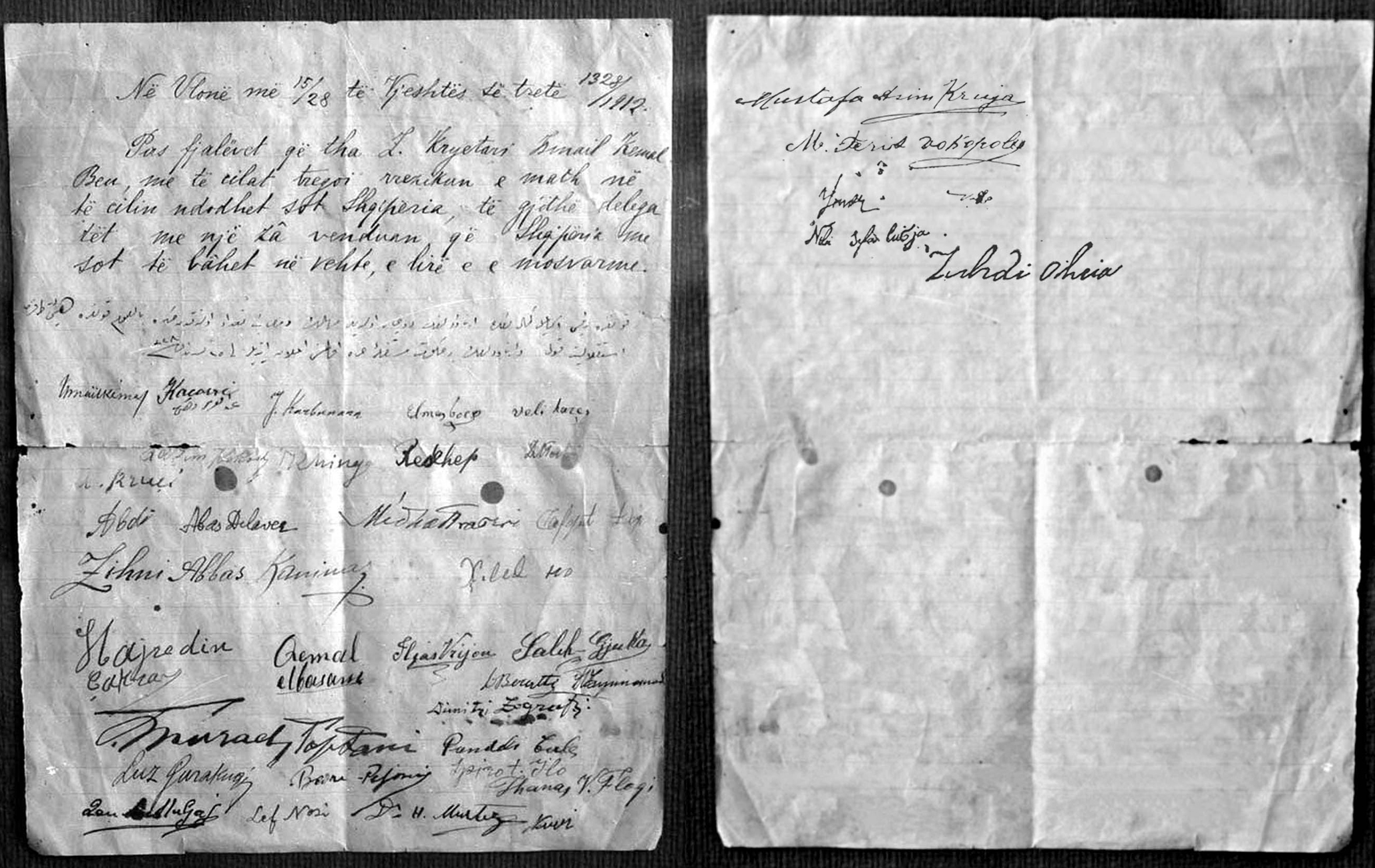
- Photomontage of the original document of the Declaration of Independence
- Created: 28 November 1912
- Ratified: 28 November 1912
- Location: Vlorë, Albania
- Author(s): Ismail Qemali, Luigj Gurakuqi
- Signatories: 40
- Purpose: Independence from Ottoman Empire

The Albanian Declaration of Independence (Albanian: Deklarata e Pavarësisë) was the declaration of independence of Albania from the Ottoman Empire. Independent Albania was proclaimed in Vlorë on 28 November 1912. Six days later the Assembly of Vlorë formed the Provisional Government of Albania which was led by Ismail Qemali and the Council of Elders (Pleqnia).

The success of the Albanian Revolt of 1912 sent a strong signal to the neighboring countries that the Ottoman Empire was weak. The Kingdom of Serbia opposed the plan for an Albanian Vilayet, preferring a partition of the European territory of the Ottoman Empire among the four Balkan allies. Balkan allies planned the partition of the European territory of the Ottoman Empire among them and in the meantime the territory conquered during First Balkan War was agreed to have status of the Condominium. That was the reason for Qemali to organize an All-Albanian Congress in Vlorë.

== Independence ==
=== Declaration ===
The Assembly of 40 delegates meeting in southern Albania in the city of Vlorë on 28 November 1912, declared Albania an independent country. On 4 December 1912 they set up a provisional government. The complete text of the declaration, composed in Albanian, partially in Gheg, Tosk and Ottoman Turkish, was:

In Vlorë on 15/28 of the third Autumn 1328/1912. After the words spoken by Mr. Chairman Ismail Kemal Bey, in which he told of the great danger Albania is in today, all the delegates with one voice decided that Albania today is to be on its own, free and independent.

=== Signatories ===
Below is the list of the forty signatories as published by newspaper Perlindja e Shqipëniës. The original act of the Declaration of Independence was written on a single piece of letter. On the front page, there are a total of 34 recognizable signatures and on the back page are found 6 more signatures.

1. Ismail Qemali
  (Ismaïl Kemal)
2. Nikoll Kaçorri
  (Kaçorri)
3. Vehbi Dibra Agolli
  (Ottoman writing)
4. Jorgji Karbunara
  (J. Karbunara)
5. Elmas Boçe
  (Elmas Boce)
6. Veli Harçi
  (Veli Harçi)
7. Qazim Kokoshi
  (Qazim Kokoshi)
8. Jani Minga
  (J K Minga)
9. Rexhep Mitrovica
  (Rexhep)
10. Dhimitër Tutulani
  (Indistinguishable)
11. Aristidh Ruçi
  (A. Rruçi)
12. Abdi Toptani
  (Abdi)
13. Abaz Dilaver Çelkupa
  (Abas Dilaver)
14. Mid'hat Frashëri
  (Midhat Frashëri)
15. Shefqet Dajiu
  (Sefqit Daji)
16. Zihni Abaz Kanina
  (Zihni Abbas Kanina)
17. Xhelal Koprëncka
  (Xelal Ko)
18. Hajredin Cakrani
  (Hajredin Çakran)
19. Qemal Karaosmani
  (Qemal Elbasani)
20. Ilias Vrioni
  (Iljas Vrijon)
21. Salih Gjuka
  (Salih Gjuka)
22. Dhimitër Beratti
  (D Beratti)
23. Dhimitër Mborja
  (Dh Emmanuel)
24. Dhimitër Zografi
  (Dimitri Zografi)
25. Murad Toptani
  (Murad Toptani)
26. Pandeli Cale
  (Pandeli Cale)
27. Luigj Gurakuqi
  (Luz Gurakuqi)
28. Bedri Pejani
  (Bedri Pejani)
29. Spiridon Ilo
  (Spiro T. Ÿlo)
30. Thanas Floqi
  (Thanas V. Floqi)
31. Qemal Mullaj
  (Indistinguishable)
32. Lef Nosi
  (Lef Nosi)
33. Myrteza Ali Struga
  (D. H. Murtezi)
34. Nuri Sojliu
  (Nuri)
35. Mustafa Merlika-Kruja
  (Mustafa Asim Kruja)
36. Ferid Vokopola
  (M. Ferid Vokopola)
37. Ymer Deliallisi
  (Ymer)
38. Xhemal Deliallisi
  (Cemmalyyddin bey)
39. Nebi Sefa
  (Nebi Sefa Lusja)
40. Zyhdi Ohri
  (Zuhdi Ohria)

=== Assembly of Vlorë ===
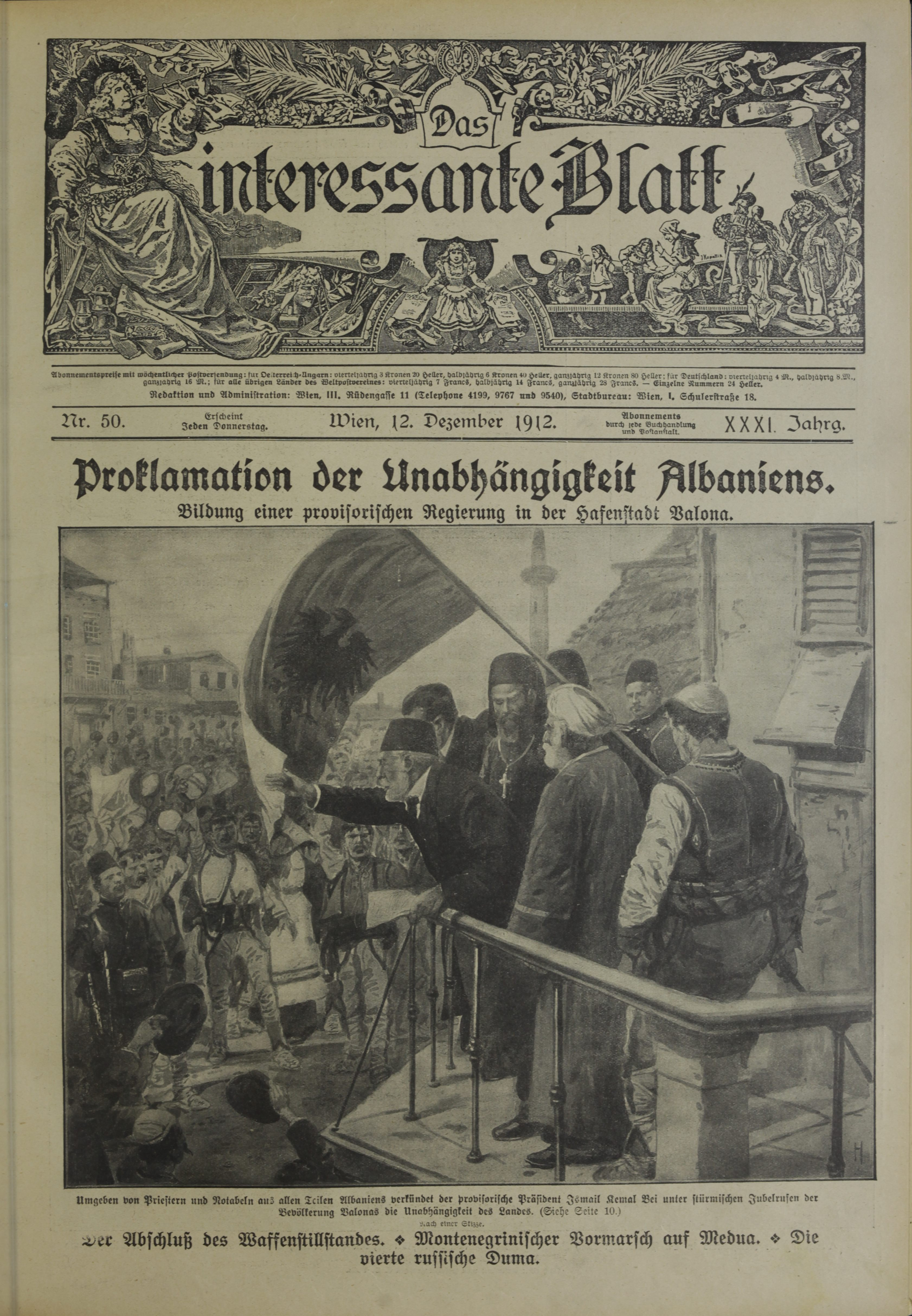
The day of the Proclamation of Albanian Independence illustrated on the front page of the Austro-Hungarian newspaper Das Interessante Blatt published on 12 December 1912.

Under these circumstances, delegates from all over Albania were gathered in the Assembly of Vlorë (Albanian: Kuvendi i Vlorës). Ismail Kemal returned to Albania with Austro-Hungarian support and, at the head of a swiftly convened national assembly, declared Albanian independence in the town of Vlora on 28 November 1912. The declaration was more theoretical than practical because Vlora was the only town in the whole country under the delegates' control―yet it proved to be effective in the vacuum of power. Though Albanian independence was recognised de facto on 17 December 1912 at the London Conference of Ambassadors, it was not until 29 July 1913, after the second Balkan War and the solving of the delicate problem of Shkodra, that the international community agreed to recognise Albania as a neutral, sovereign and hereditary principality. The newspaper Përlindja of Vlora described it as follows:

The National Assembly, composed of delegates from all over Albania and convening here in Vlora, opened today at four in the afternoon at the house of Xhemil bey. Ismail Kemal bey, as the prime initiator of the gathering, took the floor and explained to the delegates the purpose of the assembly, that is, that they all must strive to do what is necessary to save Albania from the great perils it is now facing.

The chairman, Ismail Kemal Bey, then took the floor and, in an ardent, fluid and reasonable speech, stated that although they had always been faithful to the Ottoman Empire, the Albanians had never forgotten their own language and nationality, the best proof of this being the endeavours and uprisings that had taken place from time to time, in particular over the last four years, to preserve their rights and customs. The Ottoman Government had never taken their interests into consideration and had never been willing to recompense the Albanians for the great services they had rendered. It had recently shown some interest in coming to an understanding with our people, but had not given proof of good faith and had not taken all the steps needed to appease and satisfy the Albanians. War had recently broken out with four countries in the Balkans that were seeking change and rights for their peoples, united by their ethnicity and religion.

Later, these countries put aside their initial objective and, as the war was going well for them, they agreed to divide the Empire up among themselves, including Albania. Realizing that the Turkish army had been defeated and that the Empire would not survive, the Albanians, who had played a greater role in the fighting than the soldiers, hastened to take requisite steps in their own interests as owners of the country. For this reason, Ismail Kemal bey departed for Istanbul and, having come to an understanding with the Albanians of Bucharest, too, set off for Vienna, where he reached an agreement with the Great Powers that had vital interests in the Balkans. As there was no more hope of saving Albania by means of arms, the only road to salvation was to separate Albania from Turkey. Ismail Kemal bey promoted this idea and objective, that was well received by all the Great Powers, in particular by Austria and Italy. It was only Russia that remained somewhat hostile to the idea because of the Slavs, but it did not deny the existence of Albania and an Albanian people. To realise this objective, he invited all Albanians to gather in Vlora and was delighted today to see that his call had not been in vain, and that delegates had been sent from all parts of Albania to reflect together on ways to save the Fatherland. According to Ismail Kemal Bey, the most urgent measures that the Albanian nation must take today are these: that Albania be independent under a provisional government; that a council of elders be elected to assist and supervise the government; and that a commission be sent to Europe to defend Albanian interests among the Great Powers.

The delegates unanimously agreed with the words of Ismail Kemal bey and resolved that Albania, as of today, should be on her own, free and independent under a provisional government.

The meeting was adjourned until the following day and the delegates went out and greeted the flag that was raised at five thirty in the afternoon.

The second session of the Assembly of Vlorë was held on 4 December 1912. During that members of the assembly founded the first government of Independent Albania on 4 December 1912, which was led by Ismail Kemal. The government established also a 'Council of Elders' (Pleqësia), which would help the government to its duties. In addition, the Assembly of Vlorë decided that it would agree to any decision of the Great Powers for the system of government in Albania and that the provisional government would cease to exist after the recognition of independence of the country and the nomination of the monarch.

The same day, Kemal waved the national flag of Albania, from the balcony of the Assembly of Vlorë, in the presence of hundreds of Albanians.

== Delegates ==
This is a complete list of the 79 registered delegates by region:

79 Delegates
Berat — Sami Vrioni, Ilias Vrioni, Dhimitër Tutulani, Babë Dud Karbunara
Çamëri — Veli Gërra, Jakup Veseli, Rexhep Demi, Azis Tahir Ajdonati
Delvinë — Avni Delvina
Dibër — Vehbi Dibra, Sherif Langu
Durrës — Abaz Çelkupa, Mustafa Hanxhiu, Jahja Ballhysa, Nikoll Kaçorri
Elbasan — Lef Nosi, Shefqet Dajiu, Qemal Karaosmani, Dervish Biçaku
Gramsh — Ismail Qemali Gramshi
Gjirokastër — Azis Efendi Gjirokastra, Elmas Boçe, Veli Harçi,
Mufid Libohova, Petro Poga, Jani Papadhopulli, Hysen Hoxha
Janinë — Kristo Meksi, Aristidh Ruçi
Korçë — Pandeli Cale, Thanas Floqi, Spiridon Ilo
(the initial appointed delegates were Mihal Grameno, Menduh Zavalani, Stavro Karoli, Estref Vërleni that couldn't reach on time due to the Ottoman blockade of communication)
Kosovo, Dukagjin, Plavë-Guci — Rexhep Mitrovica, Bedri Pejani, Salih Gjuka, Mid'hat Frashëri, Isa Boletini, Riza Gjakova, Ajdin Draga, Dervish Ipeku, Zenel Begolli, Qerim Begolli
Krujë — Mustafa Merlika-Kruja
Lushnjë — Qemal Mullaj, Ferid Vokopola, Nebi Sefa
Mallakastër — Hajredin Cakrani
Mat — Ahmet Zogolli, Riza Zogolli, Kurt Agë Kadiu
Ohër, Strugë — Zyhdi Ohri, Myrteza Ali Struga, Nuri Sojliu,
Hamdi Ohri, Mustafa Baruti, Dervish Hima
Peqin — Mahmud Efendi Kaziu
Përmet — Veli Këlcyra, Syreja Vlora
Pogradec — Hajdar Blloshmi
Skrapar — Xhelal Koprëncka
Shijak — Xhemal Deliallisi, Ymer Deliallisi, Ibrahim Efendiu
Shkodër — Luigj Gurakuqi
Tepelenë — Fehim Mezhgorani
Tetovo — Mehmet Pashë Deralla
Tirana — Abdi Toptani, Murad Toptani
Vlorë — Ismail Kemal, Zihni Abaz Kanina, Zyhdi Vlora,
Qazim Kokoshi, Jani Minga, Eqrem Vlora
Colony of Bucharest — Dhimitër Zografi, Dhimitër Mborja, Dhimitër Beratti, Dhimitër Ilo

== Recognition of independence ==
=== Diplomatic efforts ===
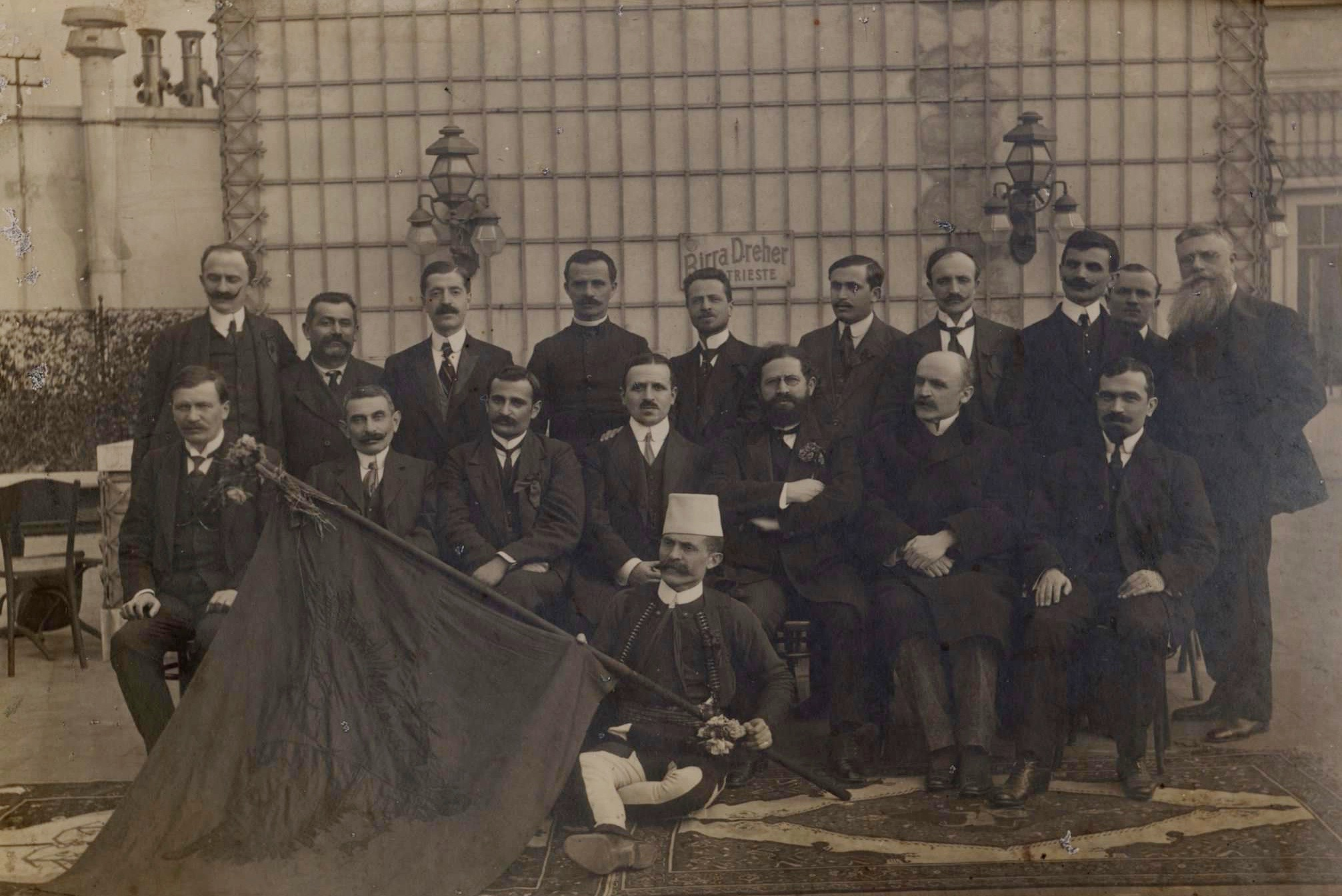
Main delegates of the Congress of Trieste (1913)

Just as the overseas communities of Albanians had stimulated the patriotic fervor which gradually led to the independence of their homeland, so at this critical juncture they once again demonstrated their solidarity. On 1 March 1913, they convened an Albanian Congress of Trieste, Austria. There were 119 representatives in all, coming from the United States, Romania, Bulgaria, Turkey, Egypt, Italy, and of course from the new state itself. Bishop Fan Noli of Boston was one of the featured speakers.

The congress recognized the provisional government of Ismail Qemal, pledged its faithful support, discussed the ethnic boundaries of the new state and sent strong resolutions to the European capitals and to the London Conference of Ambassadors then in session, appealing for their recognition of Albanian independence and for the lifting of the Greek blockade.

=== Treaty of London and recognition of independence ===
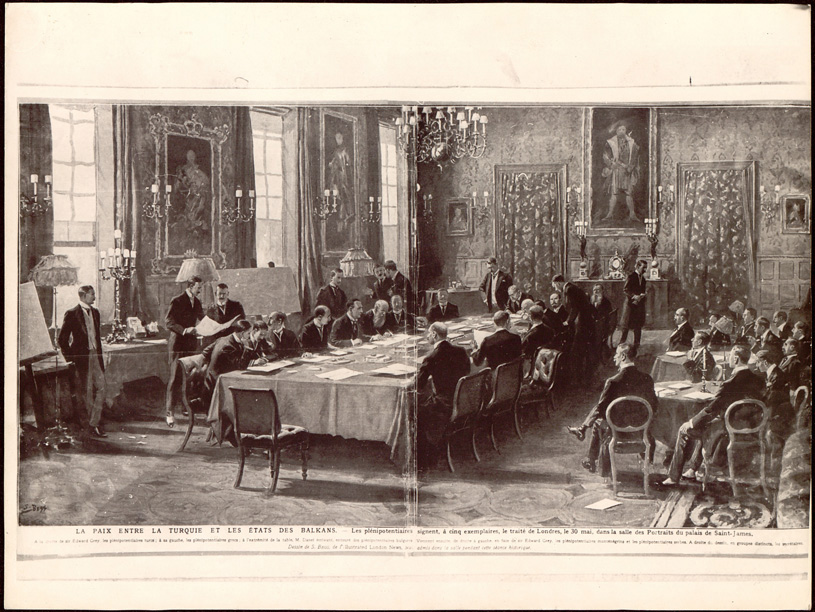
Signing of the Peace Treaty on 30 May 1913

In December 1912 the Great Powers met in London to deal with territorial adjustments arising out of the conclusion of the First Balkan War.

After months of wrangling and compromise under the constant threat of a general war, the conference announced its formal decisions on 17 May 1913. The question of Albanian independence that had prompted the Conference of Ambassadors at London came up for discussion at their first session. According to article II of the treaty, the six ambassadors decided that Albania would be recognized as an autonomous state under the sovereignty of the Ottoman sultan.

After the breakout of the Balkan Wars, on 29 July, the ambassadors decided to recognize the total independence and sovereignty of Albania. They provided that it be governed by a European prince to be elected by the powers. Albanian neutrality would be jointly guaranteed by the six great powers. They also appointed an International Commission of Control for Albania, to be composed of one representative from each of the six powers and one Albanian. This commission would supervise the Albanian government's organization, finances and administration for a 10-year period. Dutch officers would organize the gendarmerie.

Austria-Hungary was a major supporter of Albanian independence and saw it as a way to cut off the interests of Kingdom of Serbia.

Soon after the Declaration of Independence, Albania was occupied by the Balkan League member states (Serbia, Montenegro, and Greece). The Occupation of Albania (1912–1913) took place during the Balkan Wars.

== Commemoration in Albanian banknotes ==
The facade of the building where the independence was proclaimed is depicted on the reverses of the Albanian 200 lekë banknote of 1992–1996, and of the 500 lekë banknote issued since 1996.

== See also ==
- History of Albania
- League of Prizren
- Kimza Government
- Provisional Government of Albania
- Kosovan Declaration of Independence

== Sources ==
- Albanian Academy of Science. History of Albanian People. Tirana: Botimet Toena, 2007. ISBN 978-99943-1-269-6.
- Robert Elsie. The Declaration of Albanian Independence
- Lef Nosi. Dokumenta historike për t'i shërbye historiës tone kombëtare. Tirana: Instituti i Historisë, 2007. ISBN 978-99956-10-04-3. (in Albanian)
- Edith Pierpont Stickney, Southern Albania 1912–1923
