= Baruti =

Baruti is a surname. Notable people with the surname include:

- Barly Baruti (born 1959), Congolese cartoonist
- Gilbert Baruti (born 1992), Botswanan footballer
- Mustafa Baruti, 19th-century Albanian politician
