= Vlora of Albania =

Vlora of Albania may refer to:

- Zyhdi Efendi Vlora, signatory of Albanian Declaration of Independence
- Syrja Vlora, signatory of Albanian Declaration of Independence
- Husband of Helen Margaret Kelly
