= Jani Minga =

Albanian teacher and politician (1872–1947)

Jani Kostandin Minga
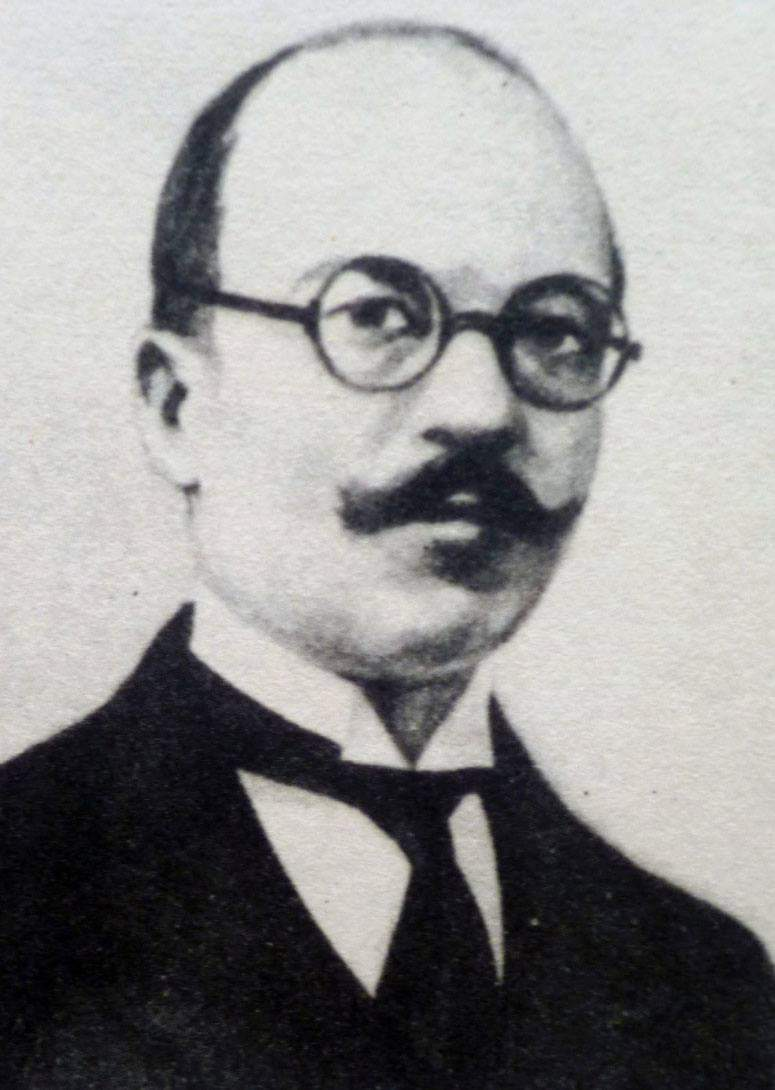
- Born: 1 August 1872; Shënpjetër, Fier, Ottoman Empire (modern Albania)
- Died: 7 May 1947 (aged 74); Vlorë, Albania
- Occupation: Teacher
- Known for: Albanian Declaration of Independence; Vlora War
- Children: Pirro Minga (Son), Mërkur Minga (Son)
- Parents: Konstandin Minga (father); Ana Minga (mother)

Jani Minga (1 August 1872 – 7 May 1947) was a patriot Albanian teacher and a notable follower of the National Renaissance of Albania. He was one of the signatories of Albanian Declaration of Independence.

== Life ==
Minga was born in Shënpjetër village, today's Fier, Albania, on August 1, 1872. His father Konstandin was an activist for education in Albanian, while his mother Ana was a descendant of Topia family of Berat. He finished the elementary school in Berat, and the high school in Qestorat, having Koto Hoxhi as a teacher. He studied and graduated later for Philology in the University of Athens. Minga knew Old and New Greek, Latin, Italian, and French.

After finishing the studies he moved to Vlorë. Minga took part in every congress on the Albanian that took place before the declaration of independence, most notably the Congress of Monastir, where the Albanian alphabet was established. He initiated the association "Labëria" in 1889 and opened the first Albanian-language school in Kanina. Minga wrote some early scholarly books on Albanian.

His patriotic activity would culminate with the participation and signature on the Albanian Declaration of Independence on 28 November 1912 as delegate of Vlora region, and participation in the Vlora War as member of a voluntary unit from the villages of Seman area near Fier. He held the victory speech in "Pavarësia" square in Vlora. Minga held also a solemn speech together with Qazim Kokoshi during the funeral of Ismail Qemali on 1919.

Minga had two sons, Pirro and Mërkur. The first one refused to join the Albanian Fascist Party though serving as an interpreter for the Germans during World War II, being arrested and sent to a concentration camp, never returning. The other one lost his life in a construction accident. Depressed from the loss of his sons, Minga retired from his activities and died on May 7, 1947.

== Legacy ==
Minga is awarded "Mësues i Popullit" (English: People's Teacher), and Honorary Citizen of Vlora.

Several schools in Albania bear his name.

In the film Nentori I dyte, Jani Minga is portrayed by the actor Agim Shuka.

== Sources ==
"History of Albanian People" Albanian Academy of Science. ISBN 99927-1-623-1
