= Zyhdi Ohri =

Albanian patriot, politician, and lawyer

- Born: 1870 February 26; Ohrid, North Macedonia, then Ottoman Empire
- Died: 1931 December 16; Diyarbakır, Turkey
- Other name: Zyhdi bey Ohri

Zyhdi Ohri (1870 – 1931), also known as Zuhdi bey Ohri, was a 19th-century Albanian patriot, politician, and lawyer. He was a representative of Ohrid and Struga in the Assembly of Vlora held on November 28, 1912, and one of the 40 signatories of the Albanian Declaration of Independence.

== Biography ==
=== Early life ===
Zyhdi Ohri was born in Ohrid, Manastir Vilayet of Ottoman Empire, today's North Macedonia. He completed the elementary school in one of the Ottoman schools in his home town. He studied jurisprudence at the University of Istanbul, where he then graduated as a lawyer. In the summer of 1897, Zyhdi Ohri returns to his homeland.

=== Patriotic and political activity ===
After returning from Istanbul, his nationalist ideologies began to emerge when, together with other prominent Albanian nationalists, such as Hamdi Ohri and Murad Sojliu, began organizing the peoples of the Ohrid, Strugë, and Velešta regions by forming cheta also preventing conscription by the Ottoman army.

As an Albanian nationalist, he participated in the League of Peja (1899-1900). He was member of the Secret Committee for the Liberation of Albania based in Monastir, and had his own cheta (guerrilla group) active during 1911-1912. In November 1912 he represented Ohrid (Albanian: Ohri) in Vlore during the Albanian Declaration of Independence. He was one of the signatories, signing as "Zuhdi Ohri". He was appointed as counselor of the Head of Senate, position held by Vehbi Dibra.
In 1920, he participated in the Congress of Lushnje.
