= Jani Papadhopulli =

Albanian politician

Jani Papadhopulli (1874–1939), also known as Jan Papadopulli, was one of the delegates of the Albanian Declaration of Independence, who was later elected as deputy of the Albanian parliament in 1923-1924, representing Gjirokastër District.

Papadhopulli was a member of the Greek minority from the village Koshovicë, in Dropull. A merchant by profession, he was a delegate of Gjirokaster in the Albanian Orthodox Congress of 1922, where the autocephaly of the Albanian church was declared.

== Sources ==
- "History of Albanian People" Albanian Academy of Science.ISBN 9992716231
