= Jorgji Çako =

Albanian lawyer and politician

Minister of Finances
- In office 1913–1914

Personal details
- Born: c. 1848 Sheper, Zagori, (then Ottoman Empire)
- Died: June 12, 1934 (aged 85–86) Vlorë, Albanian Kingdom

Jorgji Çako (c. 1848–12 June 1934), also known as Gjergj Çako, was an Albanian lawyer and politician who served as Minister of Finances in the first provisional government of Ismail Qemali.

== Life ==
Jorgji Çako was born around 1848 in the village of Sheper, Zagori, Ottoman Empire. There is very little information known about his life. He graduated from the Faculty of Law at the University of Athens and later moved to Istanbul where he served as a lawyer of a railway company. In 1912, he returned to Albania and settled in the coastal town of Vlorë. Shortly thereafter he became acquainted with Ismail Kemal and joined his newly formed provisional government as Minister of Finances, a post he held from 1913–1914. He also served as Deputy Minister of Finances from 1925–1928. Çako died in Vlorë on June 12, 1934.
