= Dhimitër Mborja =

Albanian politician and businessman

Dhimitër Emanoil (Mborja)
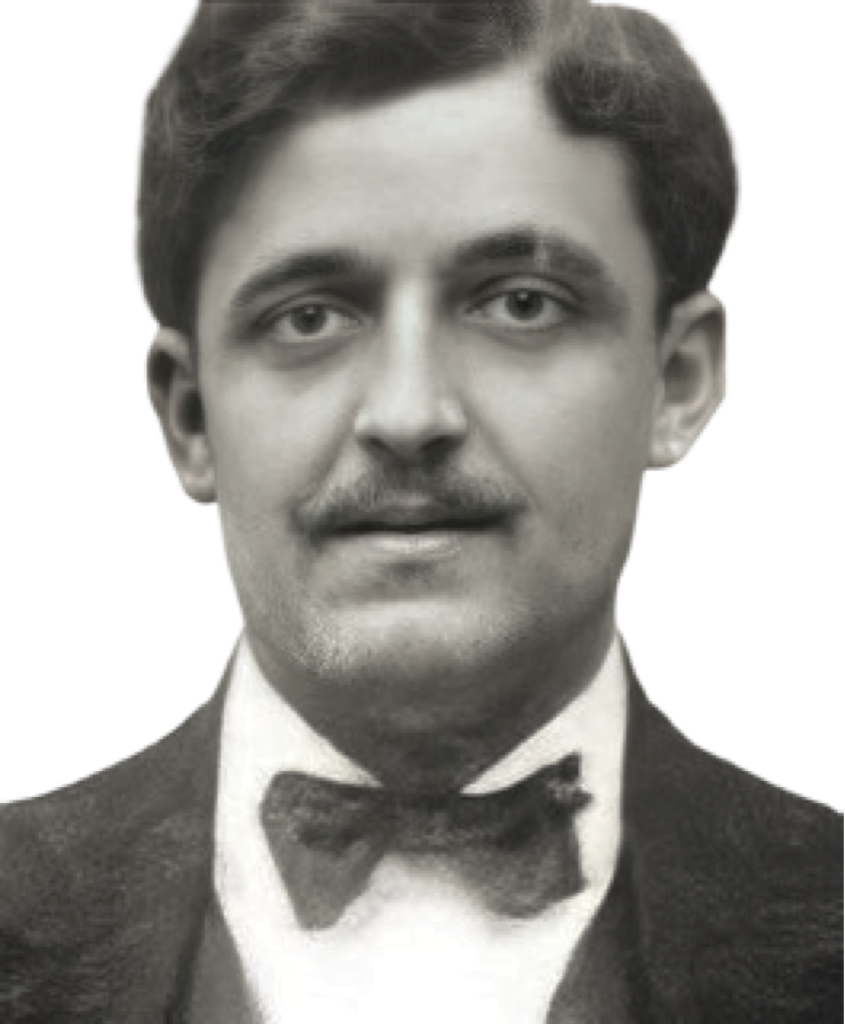
- Born: Dhimitër Emanoil; 1884; Mborje, Manastir Vilayet, Ottoman Empire
- Died: 1945 (aged 60–61); Bucharest, Romania
- Other names: Dhimitër Emanoili; Dhimitër Mborja; Dimitri Emanuel; Dimitri Mola
- Citizenship: Ottoman, Romanian
- Occupations: Entrepreneur, merchant
- Known for: Albanian Declaration of Independence; Albanian Colony of Bucharest; Albanian Congress of Trieste

Dhimitër Mborja Emanoili (1884–1945) was an Albanian politician, businessman and benefactor. He was one of the signatories of the Albanian Declaration of Independence as a representative of the Albanian community of Romania.

== Life ==
Dhimitër Mborja was born in Mborje, modern Korçë District (then part of the Manastir Vilayet of the Ottoman Empire) in 1884. At the age of sixteen, with his father, Viskë and his brothers emigrated to Bucharest. Their house in Mborje was donated in order to house the Albanian-language school of the village. In 1908 he joined the Dituria association of Korçë. Mborja emigrated to Bucharest where his name appears as the owner of a "Carpati" club and the leader of the Albanian community there. On November 5, 1912, he was elected by the Albanian community of Bucharest to become a representative of the Albanians of Romania in the assembly of Vlorë, where he signed the Albanian Declaration of Independence as "D. Emanuel".
His brother, Pandeli was an adjutant of Ismail Qemali during that period, while his younger brother, Nuç served under Themistokli Gërmenji. Mborja also donated 1,000 gold napoleons to the ministry of finances of the provisional government.
Mborja was a delegate of the Bucharest colony at the Albanian Congress of Trieste in 1913.
In 1915 he was elected a councillor of the Albanian Orthodox Community of Bucharest organization, which also operated an Albanian-language school in the city. In 1919-21 he donated his mansion in Korçë to house the Albanian National Lyceum. A supporter of Fan Noli, he participated in the 1924 June Revolution that overthrew Ahmet Zogu's regime. After Zogu's return, he was self-exiled. Mborja died in 1945 in Bucharest.

On November 27, 1992 he was posthumously awarded the "Medal for Patriotic Activity" (Albanian: Medalje Për Veprimtari Patriotike), which was received by his descendants in Korçë.

== See also ==
Other delegates of the Albanian community of Romania:

- Dhimitër Zografi
- Dhimitër Ilo
- Dhimitër Beratti
- Spiridon Ilo
