= Zihni Abaz Kanina =

Albanian diplomat and politician

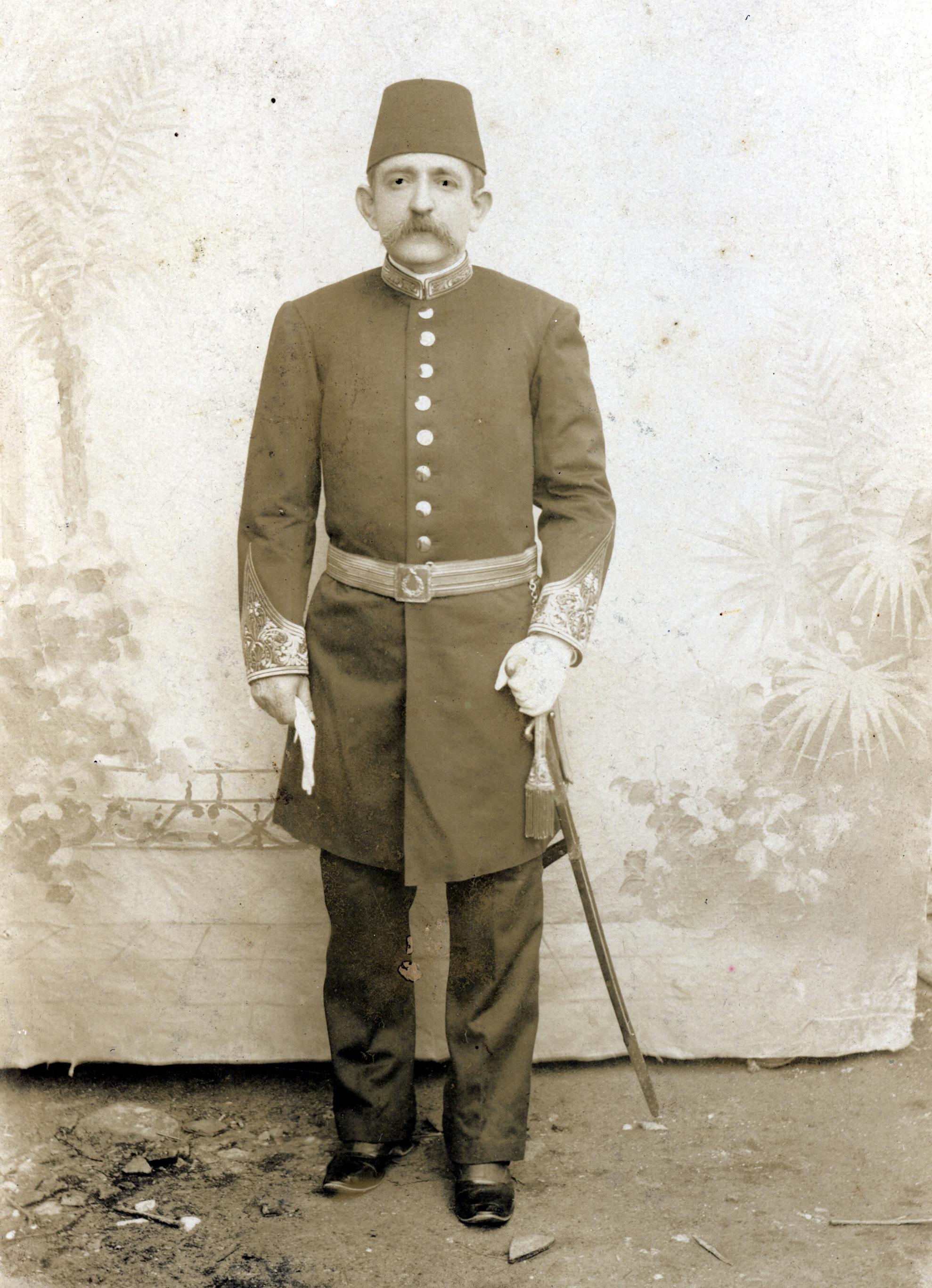
Abaz Kanina

Zihni Abas Kanina Hamzaraj (18 January 1885 in Kanina, Ottoman Empire – 1959 in Tirana, Albania) was a prominent Albanian diplomat and politician. He was one of the signatories of Albanian Declaration of Independence. He was born in a notable Albanian family in Kanina, near Vlora, and was active during the National Renaissance of Albania. After the declaration of independence, he was Director General in the Ministry of Foreign Affairs in the Provisional Government of Albania, a post he would regain during the Kingdom of Ahmet Zogu. During the Second World War he worked as a teacher of the Albanian language in his hometown, becoming a prominent activist of Balli Kombetar against occupants and communist forces. After the war, the established communist regime jailed him in 1951 on political motives and he died in 1959 in the jail of Tirana.
