= Veli Harçi =

Albanian politician

Veli Harçi (Gjirokastër 1850 – 1914), also known as Veli Harxhi, was one of the signatories of the Albanian Declaration of Independence.
