= Ibrahim Efendiu =

Albanian politician

Ibrahim Efendiu (1850, Shijak, Sanjak of Scutari, Ottoman Empire - 1930, Shijak, Albania), also known as Ali Shahin, was a 19th-century Albanian politician. He was one of the delegates of the Albanian Declaration of Independence.
