= Zyhdi Vlora =

Zyhdi Efendi Vlora was one of the signatories of the Albanian Declaration of Independence.
