= Mustafa Hanxhiu =

Albanian politician

Mustafa Hanxhiu (1840 in Tirana – 1915 in Istanbul) or Mustafa Ali Ibrahimi was a 19th-century Albanian politician. He was one of the delegates of the Albanian Declaration of Independence, where he represented Durrës.
