= Dervish Biçaku =

Albanian politician and activist involved in the Albanian National Awakening

Dervish Biçaku Bey
- Born: 1874; Elbasan, Manastir Vilayet, Ottoman Empire
- Died: 1952 (aged 77–78); Lebanon
- Education: High school in Istanbul
- Occupation(s): Landowner, politician, activist
- Known for: Signatory of the Albanian Declaration of Independence; Chairman of the Congress of Elbasan
- Parents: Jusuf Bey Biçaku (father); Hedije Zogolli (mother)
- Relatives: King Zog I (cousin)

Dervish Biçaku also known as Dervish Bej Biçakçiu (1874–1952) was an Albanian landowner, and one of the delegates of Albanian Declaration of Independence.

He was born in Elbasan, today's Albania in a landowners family, with around 2100 hectares of land in Elbasan and Lushnje areas. His father was Jusuf Bey Biçaku, and his mother was Hedije Zogolli, aunt of Ahmet Zogolli, known as the future Albanian King Zog I. He finished high school in Istanbul. He was one of the organizers of the Congress of Elbasan in 1909, one of the sponsors, and was elected its chairman. Dervish Bey Biçaku was one of the financiers of the Normal School of Elbasan. In 1912, he was a delegate of Peqin in the Assembly of Vlorë, which declared the independence of the four Albanian vilayets from the Ottoman Empire. He was appointed by the future prime-minister Ismail Kemal as future Minister of Finance, but unexpectedly he expressed disagreement with Kemal's line of government and jumped to Essad Toptanii's side.

At the end of WWII, right before the LANC forces took control in Albania, he settled in Lebanon, where he died in 1952.
