= Ismail Qemali Gramshi =

Albanian delegate

Ismail Qemali Gramshi was one of the delegates of the Albanian Declaration of Independence in 1912, representing Gramsh and Tomorrica regions.
