= Avni Bey Delvina =

Albanian politician

Avni bej Delvina was one of the delegates of the Albanian Declaration of Independence.
