= Hajredin Cakrani =

Albanian politician

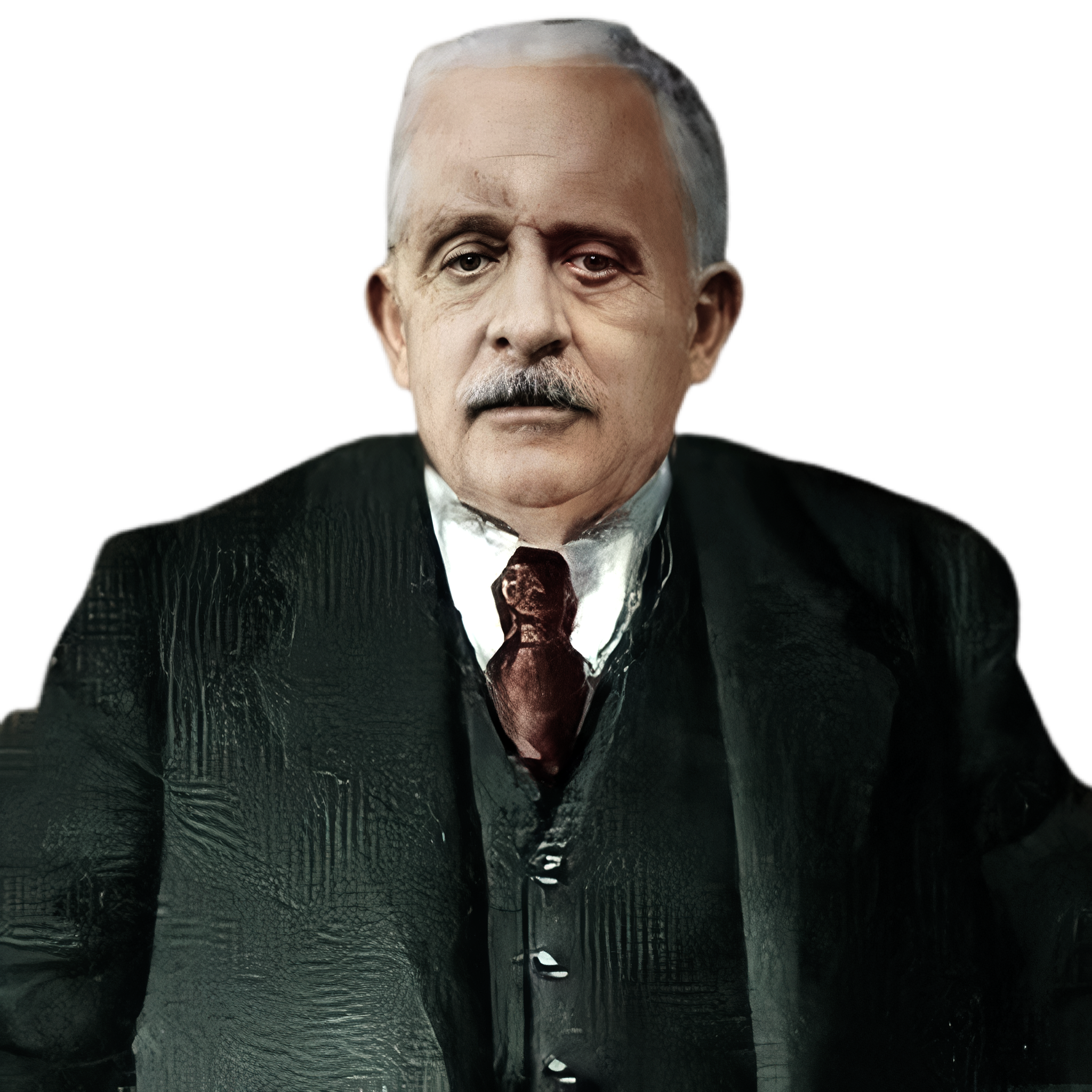
Hajredin Cakrani

Hajredin Cakrani (1860 – 1940) was a 19th-century Albanian politician. He was one of the signatories of the Albanian Declaration of Independence and a member of the senate of the Independent Albania.

== Charity work ==
The Cakrani Family and humanitarian aid after 1920

This is from the diary of a member of a prominent family, Hajredin Bey Cakrani, who was based in Cakran, Fier, South of Albania. He was one of three brothers called Bektash, Hajredin and Sulo Bey. They formed The Cakrani Foundation which was active in Albania from 1920. Initially, The Cakrani Foundation provided humanitarian aid for refugees affected by the Spanish Flu, the Balkan Wars and World War One. Later, it supported poor children through offering scholarships during King Zog’s reign, and saved all Jewish refugees who lived in Berat after the German occupation of Albania in September 1943. The family helped refugees from Kosovo between the year 1932-1935 after King Zog had sent most of them to settle in Fier, around the Seman river. All Albanian-Kosovars who now live in that part of Albania are the descendants of the Kosovar refugees of the year 1932-1935. The Cakrani Foundation tried to aid The Perugia Division, which numbered 8,000 in total after the Italian capitulation in September 1943. They rescued 500 of them and hid them in Mallakaster, where with the family’s help they built a camp, which also functioned as a hospital. Kujtim Cakrani a leading officer of Balli Kombetar, managed to hide all the Jewish families in Lushnja and Mallakaster. To stop people denouncing the Jews, Kadri Cakrani gave a roof to all of the families who they found in Berat. The level of humanitarian aid offered by this one family to people who needed it in Albania from 1914-1944 is extraordinary. All the help offered and given came from their own pockets. This family had to stop their help to the ones who were most in need in early 1945, following the persecution of the family by the communists. Today, The Cakrani Foundation has been renewed since 2000. It offers similar help to the original foundation to the ones that need it most. This foundation is run by the lawyer Kujtim Cakrani, who is a descendant of the original Cakrani family.

== Spanish flu aid relief ==
Here is a quote taken from the Hajredin Bej’s diary, a book published in Albanian by the historian Kastriot Bimo, stating: “We returned back home and saw refugees on the way which possibly are as a result of the flu and the victims of the Greeks, who have burnt down their villages, and 50-100 souls are dying every day, which is not a inconsiderable loss of life. We have been told that this flu is spread across Europe, and it’s killing people en masse. Refugees, we have been told, have come via Vlora and from both sides of Vjosa river. This is the last we needed at this time for our nation. I can easily call this a tragedy. We didn’t wait for the summer, but got together with all the local notables and appealed to everyone to collect things for the refugees, like clothes, food and money, and we as brothers to get this done, decided to give this responsibility to our ladies. Also, we have instructed our servants to help with this”. According to Marigo Posio’s chronicle of the times, the contribution of the Cakrani brothers, Hajredin, Sule and Bektash Bey, and their family to the refugees they were able to help was fourteen cows, 120 sheep, 200 Francs in money and clothes.
