= Mahmud Efendi Kaziu =

Albanian politician

Mahmud Efendi Kaziu was one of the delegates of the Albanian Declaration of Independence, where he represented Peqin, his hometown.
