= Hajdar Blloshmi =

Albanian politician (1844–1936)

- Born: 24 April 1844; Bërzeshtë, Librazhd, Albania (then Ottoman Empire)
- Died: 9 December 1936 (aged 92); Bërzeshtë, Librazhd, Albania
- Children: Salahydin Blloshmi
- Parent: Hysen Blloshmi (father)

Hajdar Hysen Blloshmi (24 April 1844 – 9 December 1936) was one of the delegates of Albanian Declaration of Independence Andy a deputy of Pogradec in the Albanian parliament. His son, Salahydin was a member of the constitutional court of Albania and a deputy of the Albanian parliament in 1925–8.

Blloshmi was born in Bërzeshtë, Librazhd District, Ottoman Empire, in the present-day municipality of Prrenjas.
