= Azis Tahir Ajdonati =

Albanian politician

Azis Tahir Ajdonati, born in Paramythia was a leading figure in the Albanian movement of Independence and one of the delegates of the Albanian Declaration of Independence, representing the region of Çamëria.
