= Qemal Mullaj =

Albanian politician

Qemal bej Mullai (1882 - 1966) was a 20th-century Albanian politician. He was one of the signatories of the Albanian Declaration of Independence.
