= Zagorka Shuke =

- Born: Zagorka Kanefçe; 17 January 1914; Ohrid, Kingdom of Serbia (modern North Macedonia)
- Died: 17 January 2000 (age 85); Pogradec, Albania
- Occupation: Actress
- Years active: 1970–1980

Zagorka Shuke (née Kanefçe born 14 July 1914 – 17 January 2000) was an Albanian film, stage and theater actress, best known for her performance in the 1972 film Kapedani.

== Biography ==
Zagorka Shuke (Kanefçe) was born in the city of Ohrid, Kingdom of Serbia in present-day North Macedonia, on 14 July 1914 and died on 17 January 2000 in the city of Pogradec, Albania. Zagorka left Ohrid at the age of 14 with her family and settled in the city of Pogradec. Her father was a professional fisherman and comes to the city of Pogradec to give his experience in this profession and this happened in 1926. Once settled in Pogradec, Zagorka distinguished herself in the arts and attended a girls school in Tirana after which she returned to Pogradec where to continue her artistic endeavours. Zagorka was the first woman to participate in the Amateur theatre of the city, playing many roles with Piro Xeci, Pandi Angjeli, Pasko Ziko, Kopi Ambon, etc. In 1962, with the creation of the Professional Variety, she became a professional actress. Zagorka also took part in Albanian films such as "Kapedani", playing the wife of uncle Sulo, "Mengjese lufte", "Rrugicat qe kerkonin diell", " Zonja nga qyteti", "Dita e pare e emerimit". Zagorka Shuke has been honored by the municipal council of the city of Pogradec with the title "Pride of the City".
