= Azis Efendi Gjirokastra =

Albanian politician

Azis Efendi Gjirokastra was one of the delegates of the Albanian Declaration of Independence.

== Sources ==
- History of Albanian People. Albanian Academy of Science. 2002. ISBN 978-99927-1-623-6.
