= Nebi Sefa =

Albanian politician

Nebi Sefa (1861 in Lushnjë, Ottoman Empire – 2 November 1942) was a 19th-century Albanian politician. He was one of the signatories of the Albanian Declaration of Independence. His descendant is Fatjon Sefa (born 23 July 1984) an Albanian professional footballer who played as a forward for Lushnja in the Albanian Superliga.
