= Jakup Veseli =

Jakup Veseli (aka Vejsel Margëllëçi) was a leading figure in the Albanian independence movement one of the delegates of Albanian Declaration of Independence, representing the region of Chameria.

He was born in Margariti, (Albanian: Margëlliç), modern-day Greece, then Ottoman Empire.
