= Elmas Boçe =

Albanian educator and diplomat

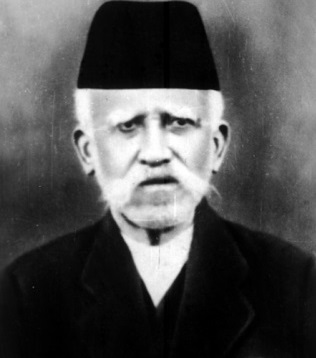
- Born: 1852; Gjirokastër, Ottoman Empire (modern day Albania)
- Died: 10 October 1925 (aged 72–73); Metan, Lushnjë, Albania
- Family: Boçe

Elmas Boçe (1852 – 10 October 1925) was an Albanian educator and a signatory of the Albanian Declaration of Independence.

== Life ==
Born in Gjirokastër in 1852 he studied in Zosimea and later in Istanbul, capital of the Ottoman Empire. A member of the Gjirokastër branch of the League of Prizren, he also funded one of the Albanian-language schools of the city Lirija. In 1911 he took part in the Assembly of Cepo and in 1912 was signatory of the Albanian Declaration of Independence.

He died on October 10, 1925, and rests in the village of Metan in Lushnjë.
