= Nikoll Kaçorri =

Albanian politician

Dom Nikoll Kaçorri
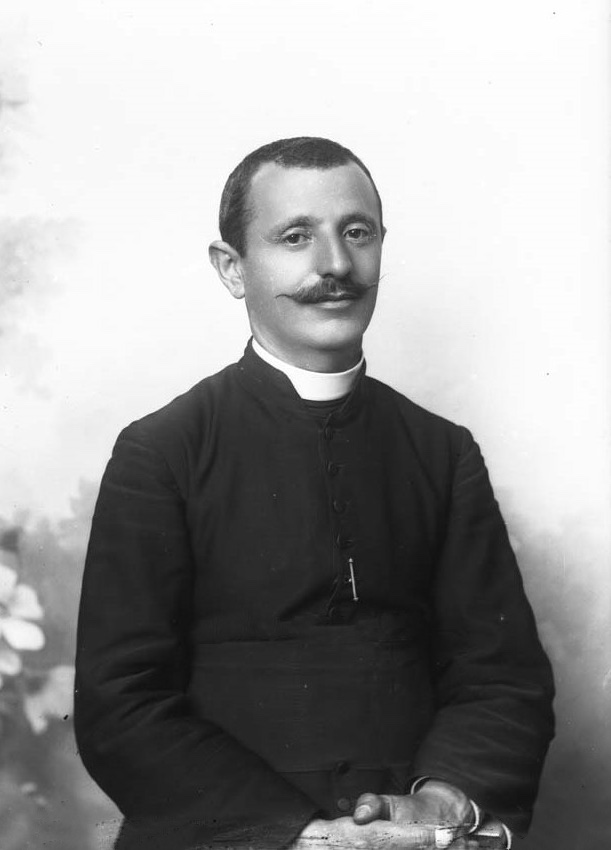
- Nikoll Kaçorri photographed by Pietro Marubi

1st Deputy Prime Minister of Albania
- In office 4 December 1912 – 30 March 1913
- Prime Minister: Ismail Qemali
- Succeeded by: Prenk Bib Doda

Personal details
- Born: 21 February 1862 Krej, Lurë, Ottoman Empire (today Albania)
- Died: 29 May 1917 (aged 55) Vienna, Austro-Hungarian Empire
- Known for: Religious and political activity

Dom Nikoll Kaçorri (21 February 1862 – 29 May 1917), was a prominent figure of the National Renaissance of Albania. A signatory of the Albanian Declaration of Independence, Dom Kaçorri served as Deputy Prime Minister of the Provisional Government of Albania, after the independence.

== Life ==
He was born in 1862 in the village of Krejë, Lurë (now in Dibër municipality). He trained for the priesthood in Troshan near Lezhë and studied theology in Italy, being ordained as a Catholic priest. On his return to Albania in 1895, he began work as a parish priest in Durrës. In the early years of the twentieth century, Kaçorri was increasingly involved in the nationalist movement, and was one of the organisers of an armed uprising in Kurbin, Krujë and Mirditë in 1905–07. In 1906, as a man of the cloth, he was made protonotary apostolic, and later in life bore the ecclesiastical title of vice general. In 1907, Kaçorri was a member of the nationalist Vllaznia (Brotherhood) society in Durrës and co-founded the Bashkimi (Unity) society in 1909. In November 1908, he took part in the Congress of Manastir, which was held to decide on an Albanian alphabet. In 1910, during an uprising in Kurbin in which he was involved, he was arrested by the Ottoman authorities for sedition and was sentenced four years in prison, though the sentence was soon reduced to 13 months.

In November 1912 Kaçorri voluntarily accompanied Ismail Qemali on his way to Albania and was present at the declaration of Albanian independence in Vlorë, as a representative of Durrës. There, he was made deputy prime minister in the first provisional government, but resigned in March 1913 after marked difference with Qemali. Kaçorri left Albania at the end of the 1913, and met Prince Wied in Berlin in January 1914. On 28 February 1914, he was in Vienna with an Albanian deputation that was received by the Austrian emperor at Schönbrunn Palace. He was to spend the rest of his life in Vienna. In April 1917, though increasingly ravaged by cancer, he took part in another Albanian deputation to pay homage to the emperor in Vienna, but died a month later at the Fürth sanatorium. He was buried on 2 June 1917 at the Vienna Central Cemetery. Nikollë Kaçorri's remains were repatriated from Vienna to Tirana almost a century later, on 9 February 2011.

== See also ==
- Signatories of Albanian Declaration of Independence
- Provisional Government of Albania
