= Qazim Kokoshi =

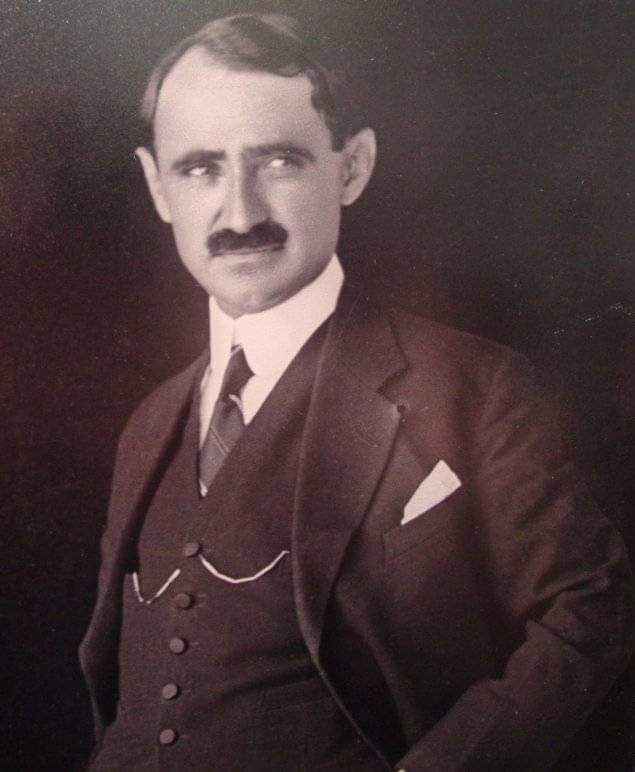
Qazim Kokoshi

Qazim Kokoshi (12 September 1882 - October 1947) was one of the signatories of the Albanian Declaration of Independence.
