= Vehbi Dibra =

Albanian mufti, theologian and publicist

Grand Mufti Vehbi Dibra
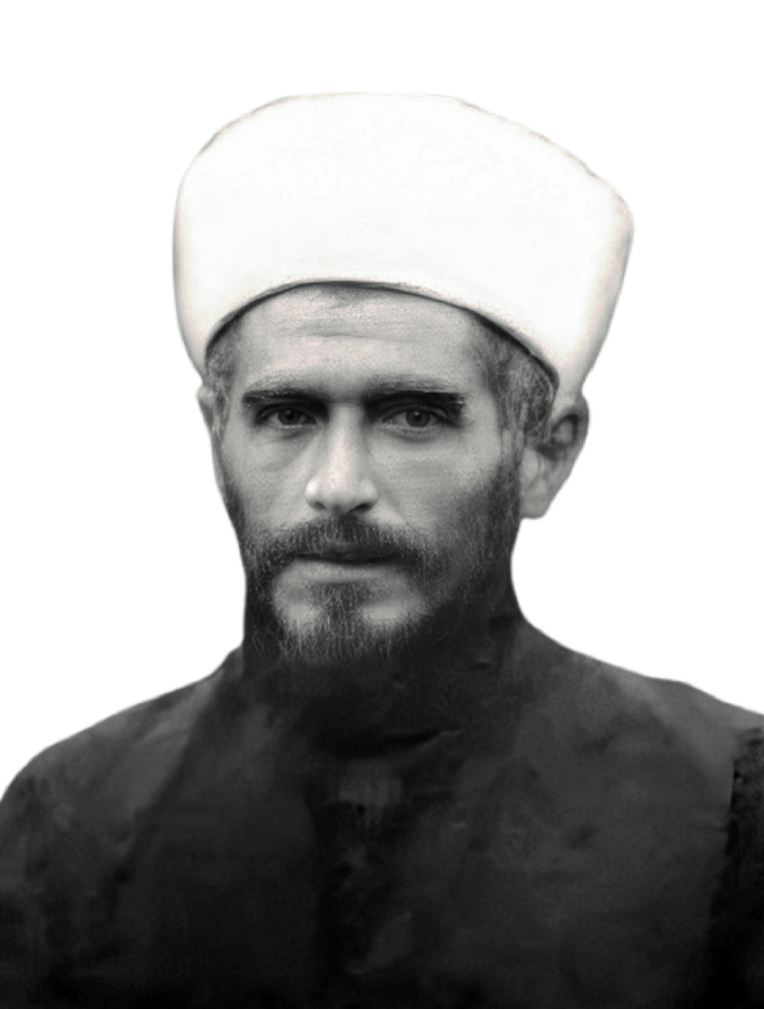

Personal life
- Born: 12 March 1867 Dibra, Ottoman Empire (modern-day Debar, North Macedonia)
- Died: 24 March 1937 (aged 70) Tirana, Albania
- Children: Ahmet, Hatixhe, Muhamet, Mereme, Asije and Edip Agolli
- Parent: Ahmet (Effendi) Agolli

Religious life
- Religion: Islam
- Denomination: Sunni
- Jurisprudence: Hanafi
- Creed: Maturidi

Muslim leader
- Post: Head of the Muslim Community of Albania
- Period in office: 1923–1929
- Successor: Behexhet Shapati

Abdyl Aziz Vehbi Dibra Agolli (12 March 1867 – 24 March 1937) was an Albanian Islamic scholar and politician. He served as the first grand mufti of the Muslim Community of Albania.

He was a delegate of Dibër at the Albanian Declaration of Independence. He was elected as chairman of the Elderly Assembly, the precursor to what is today the Parliament of Albania and the first Grand Mufti of the Muslim Community of Albania from 1920 to 1929. Vehbi Dibra will also be remembered as the main organizer of the Congress of Dibra.

== Life ==
Vehbi Agolli was born in the city of Dibra on 12 March 1867 to Ahmet Effendi Agolli, mufti of Upper Debre. He studied Islamic theology, law and philosophy and was appointed mufti of Dibër. In 1909, he was elected chairman of the Congress of Dibër, a precursor assembly of the Albanian Revolt of 1910. In November 1912, he participated as a delegate of Dibër in the Assembly of Vlorë, in which the independence of Albania was declared and a national congress was formed. The deputies of the national congress also elected eighteen delegates of the assembly to form the Albanian Senate, of which Vehbi Dibra was the first chairman.

In order to favourably influence the part of the Sunni community that based its view towards the declaration of independence of Albania on the clergy, he presented a fatwā and saluted the declaration as God's gift. A member of the reformist faction of the Sunni community of Albania, in 1920 he was elected to head it as Grand Mufti. During his tenure which lasted until 1929, the waqf properties were documented and registered, the administration was centralized and the religious services reached normalization. Dibra also began the publication of the weekly journal Zani i Naltë and introduced the use of Albanian in religious ceremonies.
