= Myrteza Ali Struga =

Albanian politician

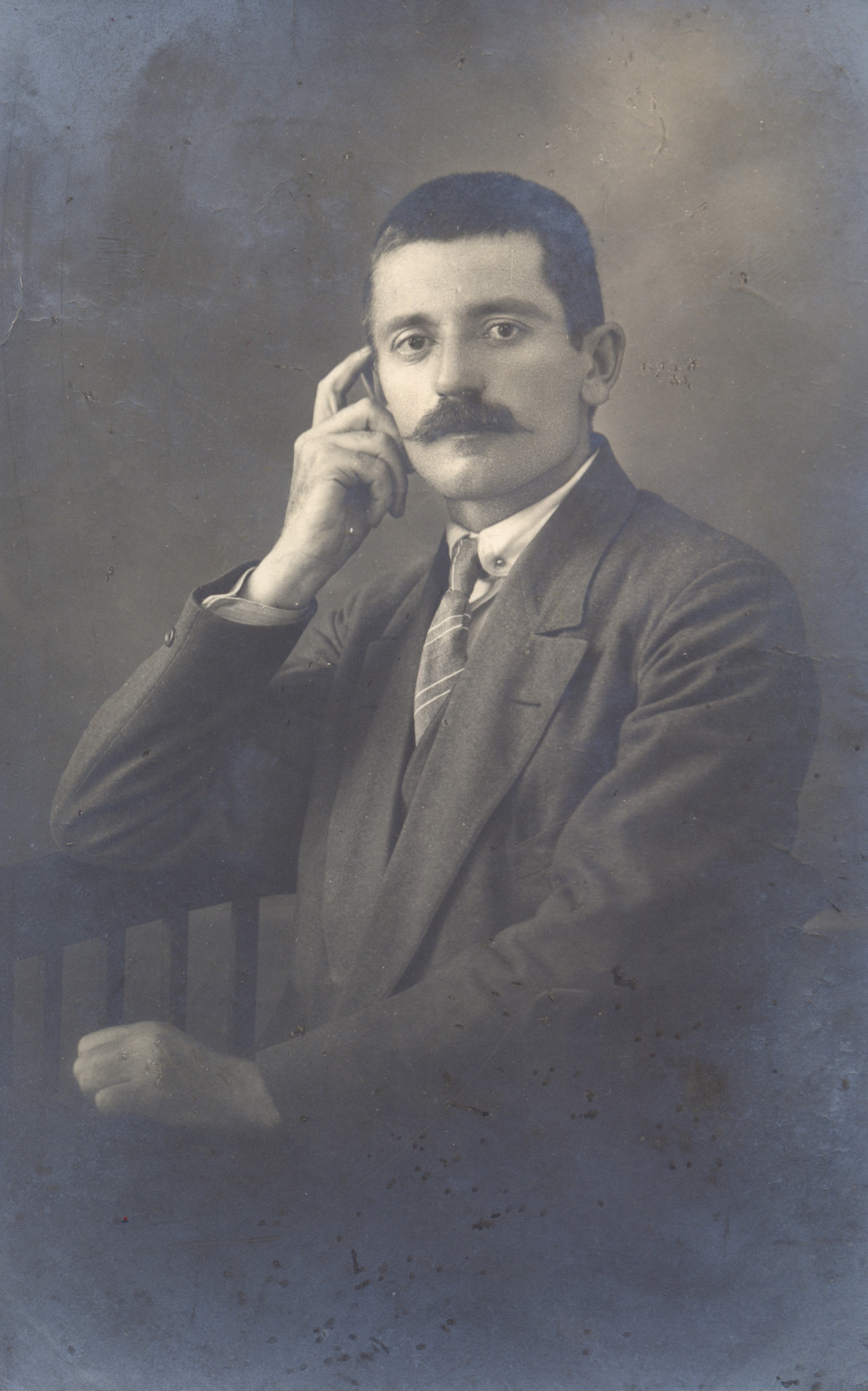
Myrteza Ali Struga

Myrteza Ali Struga (1878–1937) was an Albanian politician and medical doctor. He was one of the signatories of the Albanian Declaration of Independence.

For his contribution he was awarded Honor of Nation Order (Nder I kombit) by the Albanian president.
