= Dhimitër Ilo =

Signatory of the Albanian Declaration of Independence

Dhimitër Ilo (8 March 1862 – 1947) was an Albanian patriot from Korçë, then in the Ottoman Empire. He was a delegate from the Albanian community of Romania during the Albanian Declaration of Independence.
