= Assembly of Vlorë =

1912 Albanian assembly

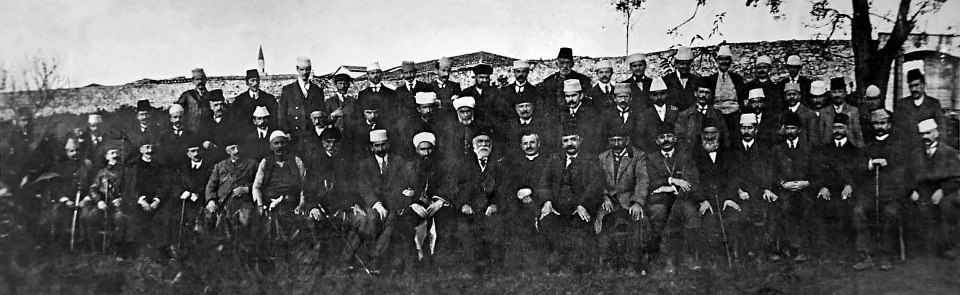
Members of the Assembly of Vlorë photographed in November 1912 or at 1st anniversary in November 1913

The Assembly of Vlorë (Albanian: Kuvendi i Vlorës) was an Albanian assembly constituted during the All-Albanian Congress in Vlorë, on November 28, 1912.

== Background ==
The All-Albanian Congress or Albanian National Congress or Albanian Independence Congress was a congress held in Vlorë (then Ottoman Empire, today Republic of Albania) on November 28, 1912. At the beginning of the session, Ismail Qemali took the floor and, referring to the threatened Albanian rights resulting from the Albanian revolts of the previous four years, explained to the participants of the congress that they should do whatever was necessary to save Albania. After his speech they began by checking the documents.

== The sessions of the Assembly of Vlorë ==
=== The constitution session of the Assembly of Vlorë ===
After the documents were checked, Ismail Qemali again took the floor and gave a speech stating that he believed that the only way to prevent division of the territory of the Albanian Vilayet between the Balkan allies was to separate it from the Ottoman Empire. Qemali's proposal was unanimously accepted and it was decided to sign the declaration of independence of Albania in the name of the constituted Assembly of Vlorë (Albanian: Kuvendi i Vlorës). By the declaration of Albanian independence the Assembly of Vlorë rejected the autonomy granted by the Ottoman Empire to the Albanian Vilayet, projected a couple of months earlier. The consensus was for complete independence.

The sitting was then suspended and members of the newly constituted National Assembly went to the house of Ismail Qemali, who raised the flag of Skanderbeg on the balcony of his house, in front of the gathered people.

=== The session held on December 4, 1912 ===
The second session of the Assembly of Vlorë was held on December 4, 1912. During that session members of the assembly established the Provisional Government of Albania. It was a government that consisted of ten members, led by Ismail Qemali until his resignation on January 22, 1914. The Assembly established the Senate (Albanian: Pleqësi) with an advisory role to the government, consisting of 18 members of the Assembly.

== See also ==
- Albanian Revolt of 1912
- Albanian Vilayet
- First Balkan War
- All-Albanian Congress
- Provisional Government of Albania
