= Nuri Sojliu =

Albanian politician

Nuri Sojliu (1870–1940) was an Albanian politician. He was one of the signatories of the Albanian Declaration of Independence.
