= Shefqet Dajiu =

Albanian politician

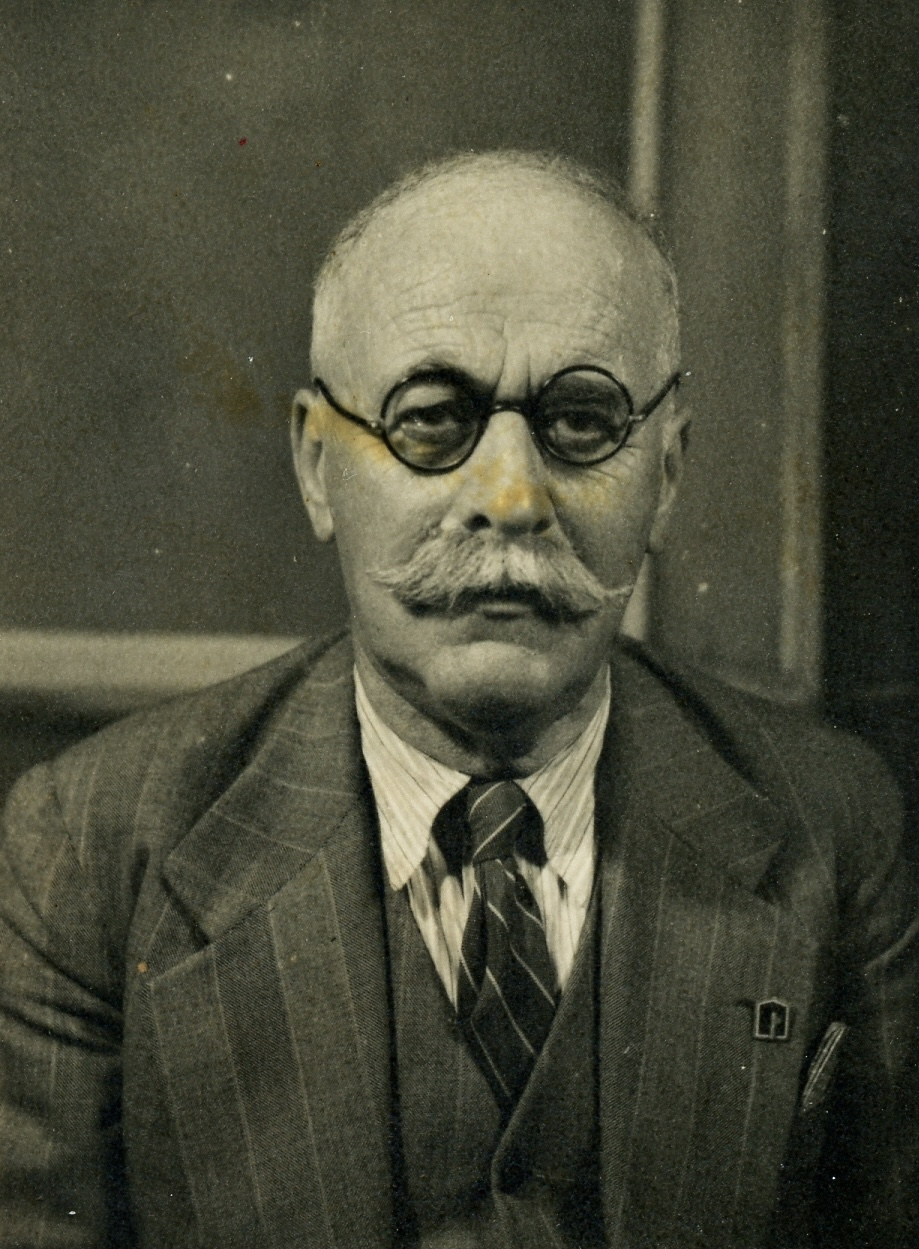
Shefqet Dajiu

Shefqet bej Dajiu was one of the signatories of the Albanian Declaration of Independence in 1912. He was the second secretary of the Congress of Vlora, when independence was declared. He was later named as prefect of Fieri, a post he held until the First World War. During the next years he did not take part in politics, and was shown again during World War II, this time as a collaborator of the Axis. He was killed in 1946, by the communist regime, for his collaborative activity.
