= Xhelal Koprëncka =

Albanian politician

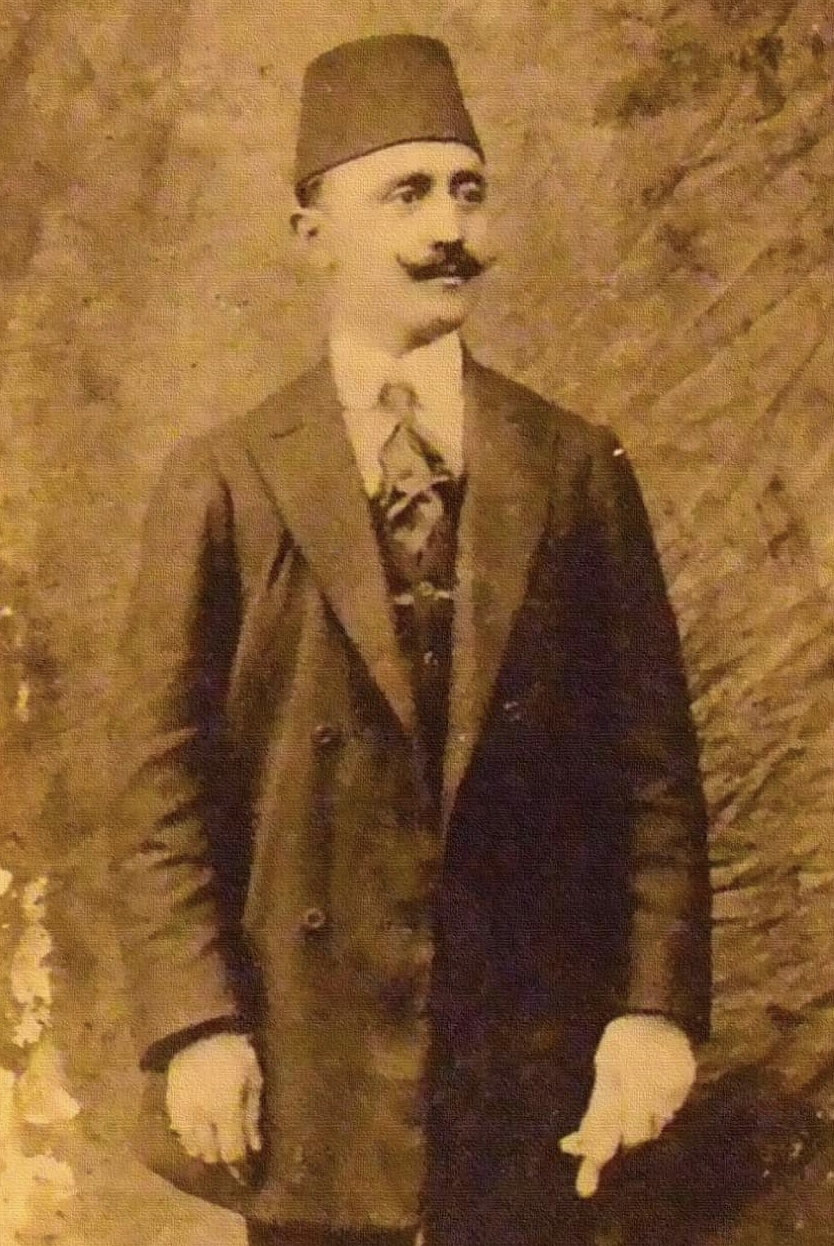
Xhelal Bey Koprencka

Xhelal Bey Koprëncka (1876 – 21 October 1919) was an Albanian politician. He was one of the signatories of the Albanian Declaration of Independence. He was from Çorovodë originally which is located within Skrapar, southern Albania. He spoke with the Tosk dialect of the Albanian language.
