= Mustafa Baruti =

Albanian politician

Mustafa Baruti was a 19th-century Albanian politician. He was one of the delegates of the Albanian Declaration of Independence.
