= Provisional Government of Albania =

First government of Albania from 1912 to 1914

Provisional Government
- 1st Government of Albania
- 1912–1914
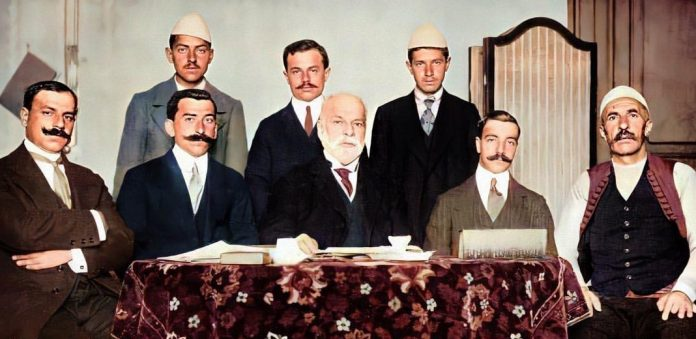
- Photograph taken in Rome, Italy (clockwise from top to bottom): Adem Boletini, Dhimitër Beratti, Mustafa Boletini; Et'hem bey Vlora, Luigj Gurakuqi, Ismail Qemali, Qazim bey Vlora, Isa Boletini
- Date formed: 4 December 1912
- Date dissolved: 22 January 1914

People and organisations
- Prime Minister: Ismail Qemali
- Deputy Prime Minister: Nikoll Kaçorri; Prenk Bib Doda
- No. of ministers: 9

History
- Election: Assembly of Vlorë
- Successor: International Control Commission

The Provisional Government of Albania (Albanian: Qeveria e Përkohshme e Shqipërisë), also called the Qemali Government, was the first government of Albania, created by the Assembly of Vlorë on 4 December 1912. It was a paternal government, led by Ismail Qemali, until his resignation on 22 January 1914, followed by the International Control Commission until the proclamation of the Principality of Albania.

== Qemali Government Cabinet ==
Qemali Government
Ismail Qemali – Prime Minister, Minister of Foreign Affairs (Note: The full mandate of a cabinet is considered as such from the moment the prime minister swears the oath of office until the day of their resignation.)
Nikoll Kaçorri – Deputy Prime Minister (until 30 March 1913; replaced by Prenk Bib Doda who took office on 25 December 1913) (Note: The title "Substitutive" (gheg albanian: Zavëndësisht), often using the acronym "Zav.", references to the temporary exercise of duty by an official who was not formally appointed by the prime minister but occupied the interim role of the vacant minister.)
Mufid Libohova – Minister of Internal Affairs (until July 1913; replaced by Esad Toptani who served until September 1913; replaced by Hasan Prishtina who served from September - 20 November 1913; replaced by Fejzi Alizoti)
Abdi Toptani – Minister of Finances (Aziz Vrioni served concurrently until October 1913; replaced by Jorgji Çako)
Mid'hat Frashëri – Minister of Public Works (until 30 March 1913; replaced by Pandeli Cale)
Mehmet Deralla – Minister of War (until 25 December 1913; replaced by Fejzi Alizoti)
Luigj Gurakuqi – Minister of Education
Pandeli Cale – Minister of Agriculture (until 15 September 1913; replaced by Hasan Prishtina who served until 10 October 1913; replaced by Qemal Karaosmani who served from November 1913)
Lef Nosi – Minister of Post-Telegraphs
Petro Poga – Minister of Justice (Note: The ministers are listed by rank of importance.)
