= Balkan League =

1912 anti-Ottoman military alliance

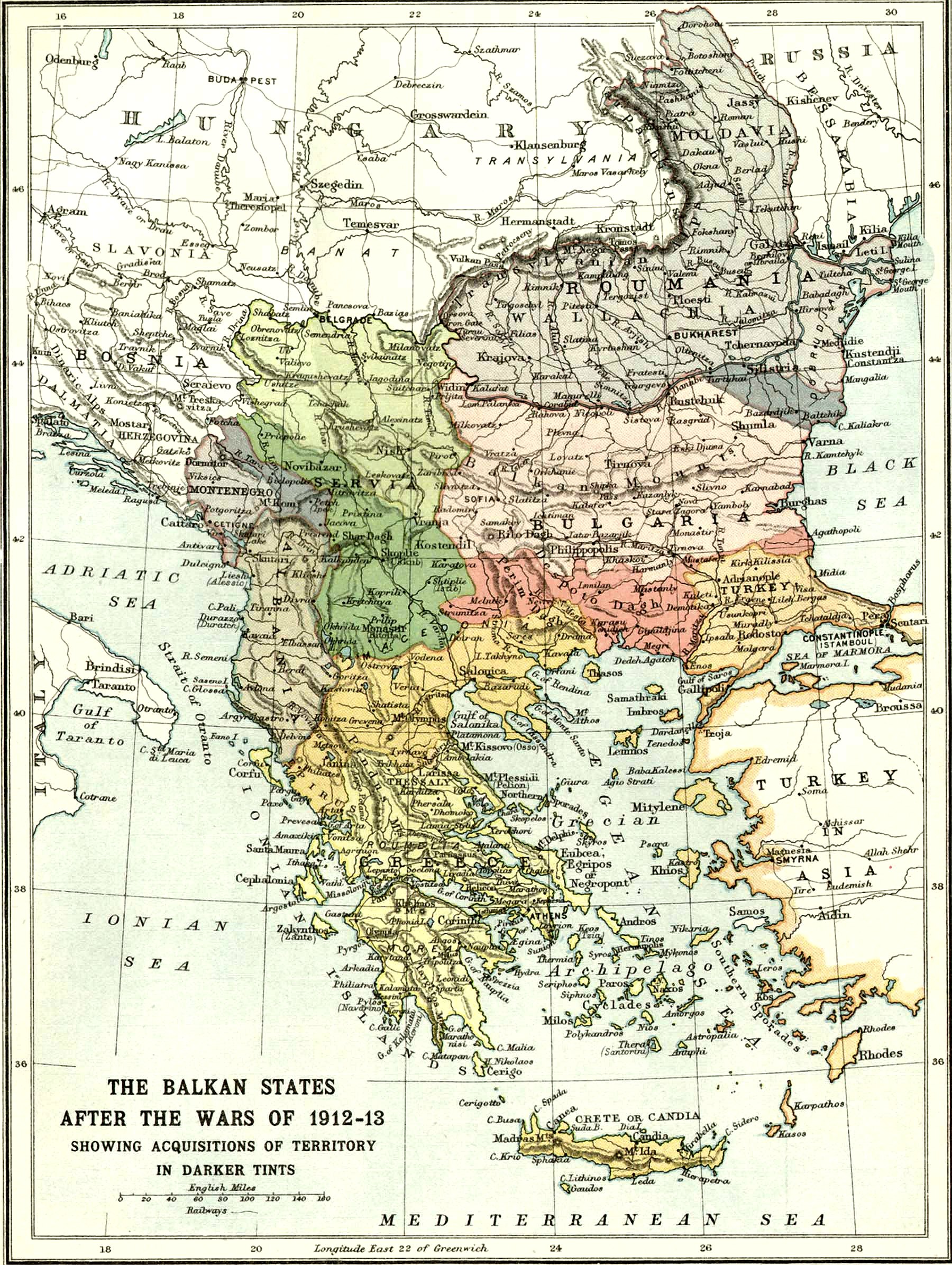
Map showing the borders of the Balkan states before and after both Balkan Wars.

The Balkan League was a quadruple alliance spearheaded by Eleftherios Venizelos and formed through a series of bilateral treaties concluded in 1912 between the Eastern Orthodox kingdoms of Greece, Bulgaria, Serbia and Montenegro, and directed against the Ottoman Empire, which still controlled much of Southeastern Europe.

The Balkans had been in a state of turmoil since the early 1900s, with years of guerrilla warfare in Macedonia followed by the Young Turk Revolution, the protracted Bosnian Crisis, and several Albanian Uprisings. The outbreak of the Italo-Turkish War in 1911 had further weakened the Ottomans and emboldened the Balkan states. Under Russian influence, Serbia and Bulgaria settled their differences and signed an alliance, which was originally directed against Austria-Hungary, on 13 March 1912, but by adding a secret chapter to it essentially redirected the alliance against the Ottoman Empire. Serbia then signed a mutual alliance with Montenegro, and Bulgaria did the same with Greece.

The League was victorious in the First Balkan War which broke out in October 1912, where it successfully seized control of almost all European Ottoman territories. After the victory, however, unresolved prior differences between the allies re-emerged over the division of the spoils, particularly Macedonia, leading to the effective break-up of the League, and soon after, on 16 June 1913, Bulgaria attacked her erstwhile allies, beginning the Second Balkan War.

== Background ==
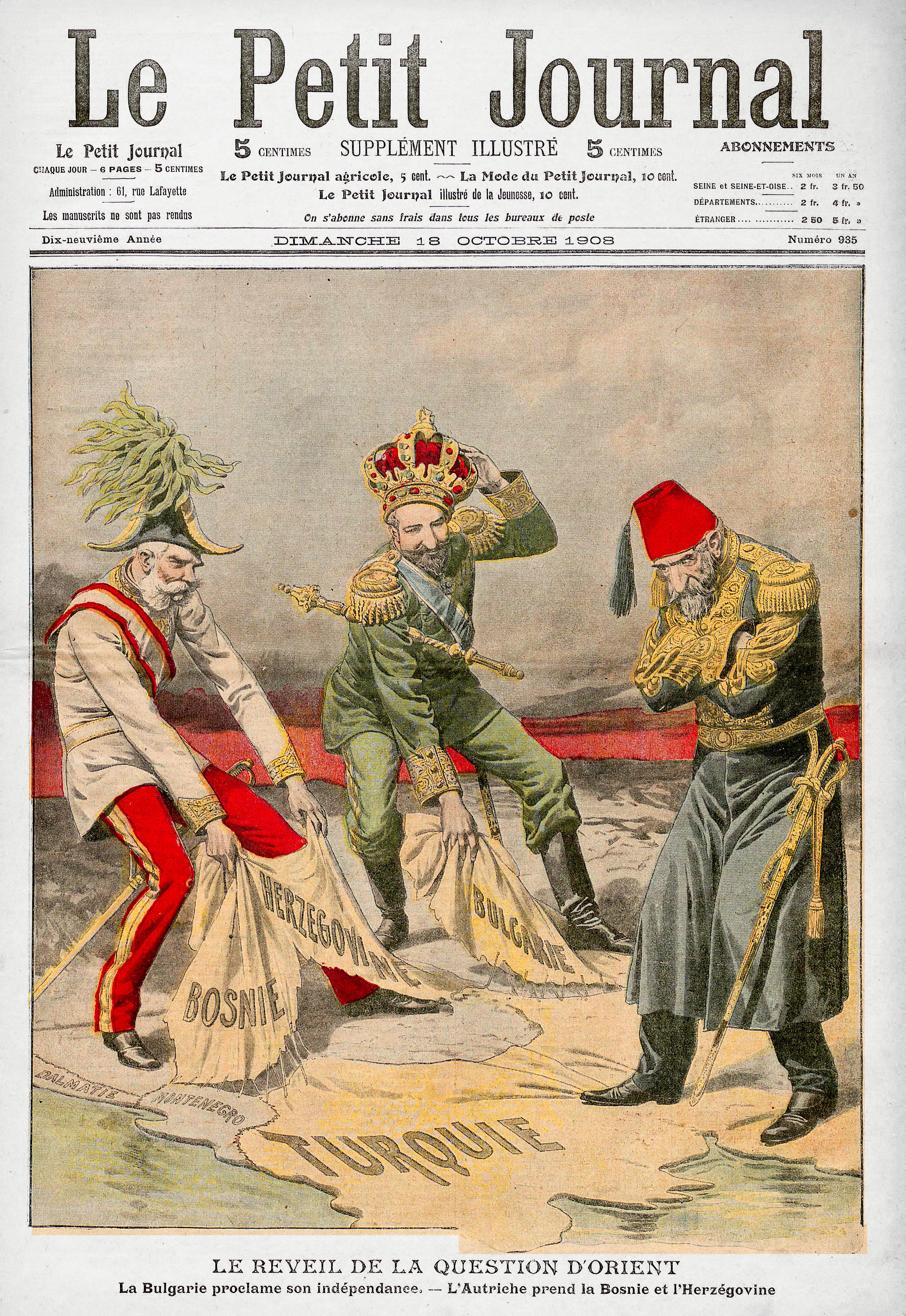
The Bosnian Crisis of 1908 altered the balance of power in the Balkans and precipitated events that would lead to the formation of the Balkan League. Cover of the French periodical Le Petit Journal.

After the Crimean War (1853–1856), Russia realised that the other Great Powers would spare no effort to prevent it from gaining access to the Mediterranean. In consequence, it started engineering an ambitious plan for indirect expansion through the creation of friendly and closely allied states under Russian patronage in the Balkan Peninsula. Instrumental to the policy was the emerging Panslavic movement, which henceforth formed the basis of Russian foreign policy up until the end of the tsarist regime in 1917. Working in this direction, following the victorious Russo-Turkish War of 1877–1878, Russia managed to establish an autonomous Bulgarian state. Similarly, after saving Serbia from annihilation at the Ottoman' hands in 1876, Russia forced the Ottomans to accept a full independence and expanded Serbia two years later.

However, although both states acknowledged Russian patronage and protection, their conflicted national aspirations soon led to a series of hostile actions before and after the short war between them. With the antagonism of the European powers mounting, and smarting from her humiliation by the Austrians at the Bosnian Crisis, Russia sought to gain the upper hand by creating a Russophile "Slavic block" in the Balkans directed against Austria-Hungary and the Ottomans. Consequently, Russian diplomacy began pressuring the two countries, Serbia and Bulgaria, to reach a compromise and to form an alliance.

Apart from the Russian pressure upon Bulgaria and Serbia, another issue that triggered the formation of the League was the Albanian Uprising of 1911. The timetable of the negotiations between Serbia and Bulgaria indicates that progress paralleled the success of the Albanian revolt. In May 1912 the Albanians succeeded in taking Skopje and continued towards Monastir, forcing the Ottomans to recognise the autonomy of Albania in June 1912. That was considered catastrophic for Serbia; after its hopes of expansion to the north were thwarted by the Austro-Hungarian annexation of Bosnia and Herzegovina in October 1908, Serbia now found the last direction of possible expansion, the south, also closing by the creation of an Albanian Vilayet. The Serbs now wanted to stop the establishment of the Albanian state. On the other hand, Bulgaria used the Serbian anxiety to force Serbia to agree to significant concessions in regard to Vardar Macedonia.

Thus, the final agreement between the two countries stipulated that in the event of a victorious war against the Ottomans, Bulgaria would receive all of Macedonia south of the Kriva Palanka–Ohrid line. Serbia's expansion was to be to the north of this line, including Kosovo, and west to the Adriatic coast, a territory including the northern half of modern Albania, giving Serbia access to the sea. In essence, Serbia was forced to exchange Macedonia for Albania, an issue that would play a key role in the eventual dissolution of the League in the spring of 1913, when the Great Powers insisted upon the creation of the Albanian state and denied Serbia its territorial gains in that direction.

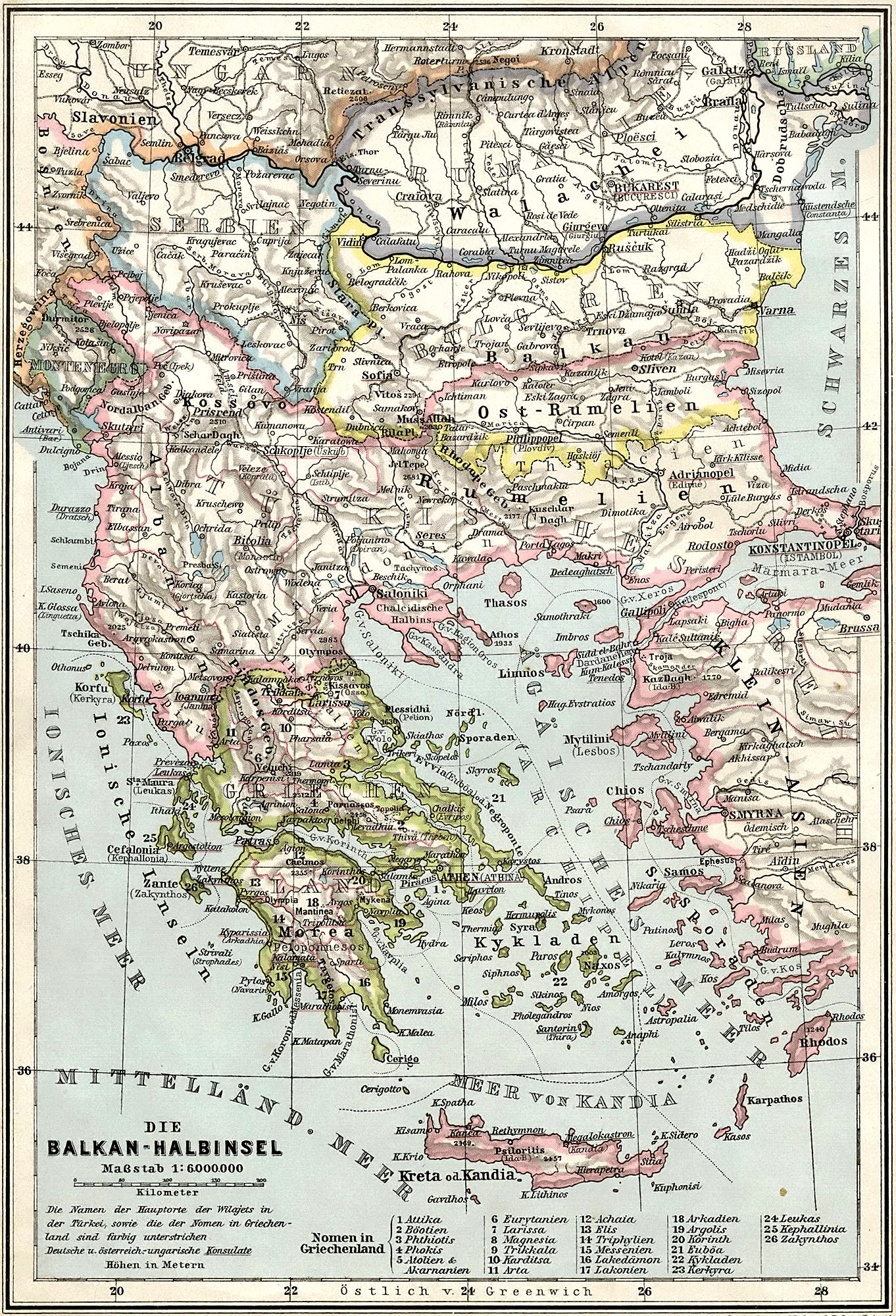
The Balkans at the time of the formation of the Balkan League, before the Balkan Wars.

Bulgaria, on its part, had held a long-term policy regarding the Ottomans since regaining independence during the Russo-Turkish War. After the successful coup d'état for the incorporation of Eastern Rumelia, Bulgaria had orchestrated a methodical scenario of indirect expansion through the creation, in the multi-ethnic Ottoman-held Macedonia (for many centuries an administrative rather than a nationalistic name), of a united, liberating and revolutionary organization, the IMRO, allegedly without national color. IMRO's rhetoric claimed to be speaking generally for liberation on behalf of the "Macedonian People" and declared its anti-chauvinism. In fact, it was a Bulgarian-backed organization created with the secret agenda of facilitating the incorporation of Thrace (Eastern and Western) and Macedonia (Aegean and the Vardar) into a new autonomous state, as an intermediate step before unification with Bulgaria could take place in the same way as with Eastern Rumelia.

After initial success, Serbia and especially Greece realized the true purpose of IMRO and consequently, a vicious guerrilla war, the so-called Macedonian Struggle broke out between Bulgarian and Greek-backed armed groups within Ottoman Macedonia. The conflict ended only when the Young Turks movement came to power, promising reforms and equality of all Ottoman subjects regardless of religion or nationality. Bulgaria then turned to the more direct method of expansion through winning a war, building a large army for that purpose, and started to see itself as the "Prussia of the Balkans". However, even so, it was clear that Bulgaria could not win a war against the Ottomans alone, and an alliance was necessary. By signing the military appendix to the original agreement Bulgaria aimed to use the Serbian army to seize most of Macedonia while concentrating her own army for the operations against Thrace with its major cities of Adrianople and Constantinople.

In Greece, army officers had revolted in August 1909 and secured the appointment of a progressive government under Eleftherios Venizelos, which they hoped would resolve the Cretan issue in Greece's favour and reverse their defeat of 1897 at the hands of the Ottomans. In the discussions that led Greece to join the League, Bulgaria refused to commit to any agreement on the distribution of territorial gains unlike the deal with Serbia over Vardar Macedonia. The reason was Bulgaria's diplomatic policy of pushing Serbia into an agreement limiting its access to Macedonia and at the same time refusing any such agreement with Greece. Having low regard for the Greek Army's military effectiveness, the Bulgarian leadership estimated that according to the military plans, their limited forces that had been deployed to the Macedonian theatre would be able to occupy the larger part of the region and the important port city of Thessaloniki before the Greeks.

The entry of Greece to the League, however, was essential for the allies since Greece, alone among the Balkan states in possessing a major fleet, could preclude the mass transfer of Ottoman reinforcements from Asia directly into Europe by sea. As the Greek ambassador to Sofia had put it during the negotiations that led to Greece's entry in the League, "Greece can provide 600,000 men for the war effort. 200,000 men in the field, and the fleet will be able to stop 400,000 men being landed by Turkey between Salonika and Gallipoli."

Montenegro, a relatively small country but a close ally of Serbia, was considered a second-class participant. It took the invitation to the insistence of Serbia more as a favour since it had limited local aspirations over the Sanjak and city of Shkodër, both in northern Albania.

Another fact that helped the formation of the League was the evident inefficiency of the Ottoman Army. The Ottomans were at war with Italy for a year (29 September 1911 to 18 October 1912) over Libya after Italy had launched an invasion of Tripolitania. Although the Italians made little progress and Ottoman resistance, aided by the Libyans, proved stiffer than expected, the war exhausted the Ottoman state. In addition, the Italian occupation of the Greek-inhabited Dodecanese Islands served as a warning for Greece of the consequences of staying out of a future war against the Ottomans.

== Reaction of Great Powers ==
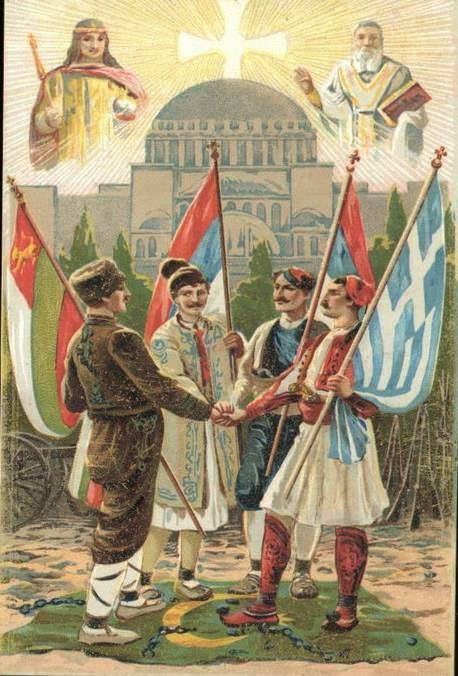
Military alliance poster, 1912.

These developments did not go unnoticed by the Great Powers, but although there was an official consensus between the European Powers over the territorial integrity of the Ottoman Empire, which led to a stern warning to the Balkan states, each of them unofficially took a different diplomatic approach because of their conflicting interests in the area. As a result, any possible preventative effect of the common official warning was canceled by the mixed unofficial signals, and failed to prevent the outbreak of hostilities:

- Russia was a prime mover in the establishment of the League and saw it as an essential tool in case of a future war against Russia's rival, the Austro-Hungarian Empire. However, it was unaware of the Bulgarian plans over Thrace and Constantinople, territories in which Russia had long-held ambitions and over which it had just secured a secret agreement of expansion from its allies France and Britain, as a reward in participating in the upcoming First World War against the Central Powers.
- France, not feeling ready for a war against Germany in 1912, took a totally negative position against the League and firmly informed its ally Russia that it would not take part in a potential conflict between Russia and Austria-Hungary if it resulted from the actions of the Balkan League. The French, however, failed to achieve British participation in a common intervention to stop the upcoming Balkan conflict.
- The British Empire, although officially a staunch supporter of the Ottoman Empire's integrity, took secret diplomatic steps encouraging the Greek entry into the League to counteract Russian influence. At the same time, it encouraged the Bulgarian aspirations over Thrace and preferred it to be Bulgarian than Russian, despite the assurances that Britain had given to the Russians in regard of their expansion there.
- Austria-Hungary, struggling for an exit from the Adriatic and seeking ways for expansion in the south at the expense of the Ottoman Empire, was totally opposed to any other nation's expansion in the area. At the same time, Austria-Hungary had its own internal problems with the significant Slavic populations that campaigned against the German–Hungarian control of the multinational state. Serbia, whose aspirations in the direction of Bosnia were no secret, was considered an enemy and the main tool of Russian machinations that were behind the agitation of Austria's Slavic subjects.
- Germany, already heavily involved in the internal Ottoman politics, officially opposed a war against the Ottomans, but in its effort to win Bulgaria for the Central Powers and seeing the inevitability of Ottoman disintegration, it was playing with the idea to replace the Balkan positions of the Ottomans with a friendly Greater Bulgaria in its San Stefano borders, an idea that was based on the German origin of the Bulgarian king and his anti-Russian sentiments.

For the Balkan League, the opportunity was too good to be missed, as the Ottoman Empire was weak and riddled with internal strife. The allied governments intensified their military and diplomatic preparations. During the last days of September, the Balkan states and the Ottoman Empire mobilized their armies. The first state to declare war was Montenegro, on October 8, 1912, starting the First Balkan War. The other three states, after issuing an ultimatum to the Porte on October 13, declared war on Turkey on October 17.

== Aftermath ==
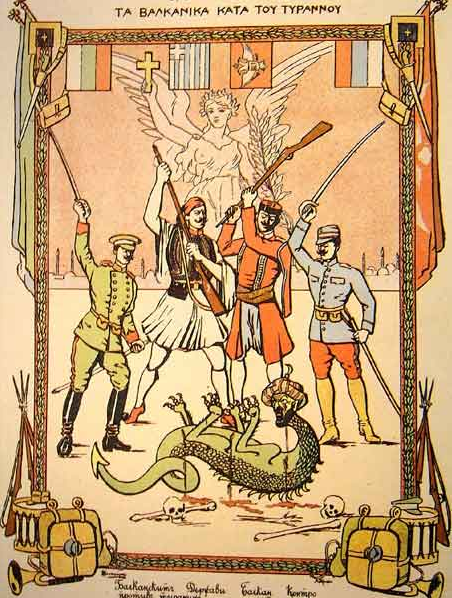
Poster of the Balkan League during the Balkan Wars reading: "The Balkan (States) against the tyrant"

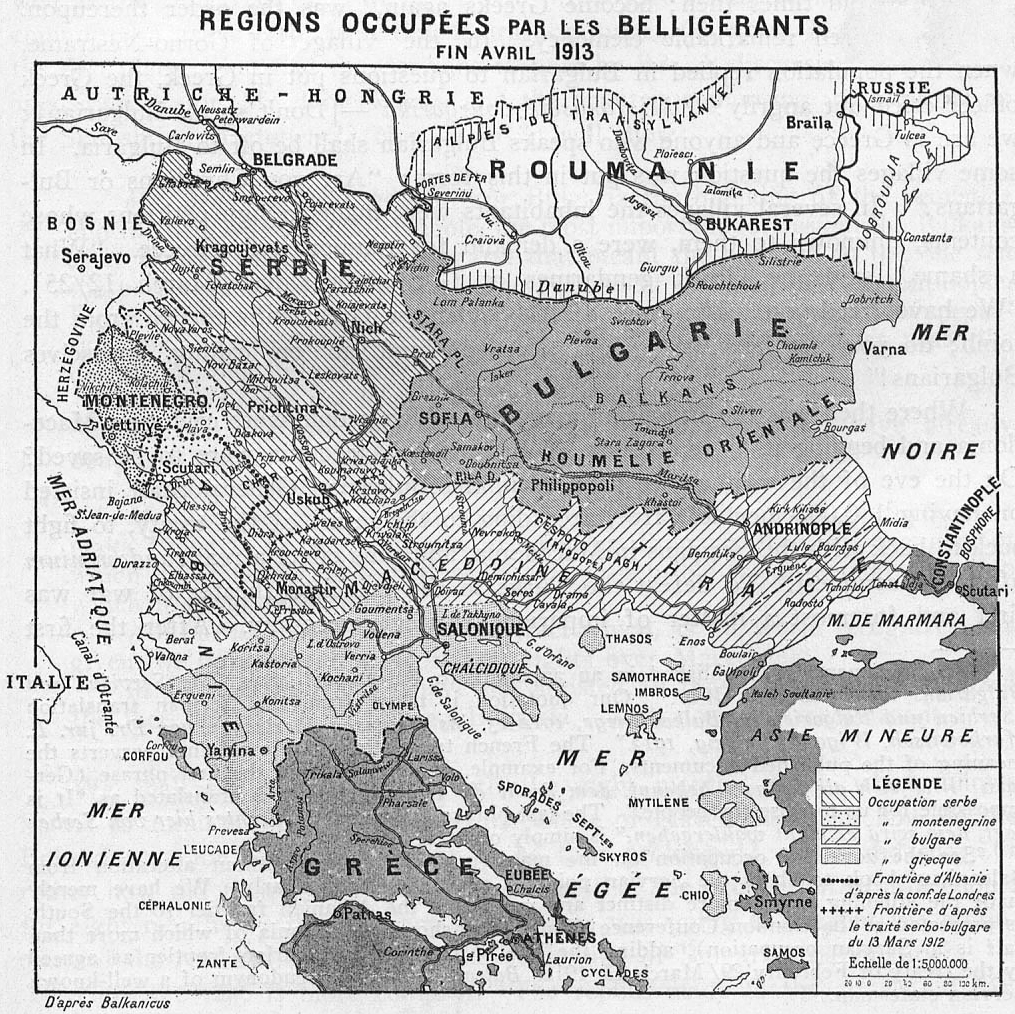
The territorial gains of the Balkan states after the First Balkan War and the line of expansion according to the prewar secret agreement between Serbia and Bulgaria

In the resulting war, the combined Balkan armies effectively destroyed Ottoman power in Europe in a series of victories. However, the League's triumph was short-lived. The antagonisms between the Balkan states still persisted, and after the successful conclusion of the First Balkan War, they resurfaced, especially over the partition of Macedonia. Mounting tensions effectively tore the League apart, and the Second Balkan War broke out when Bulgaria, confident of a quick victory, attacked its former allies Serbia and Greece. The Serbian and Greek armies repulsed the Bulgarian offensive and counterattacked, penetrating into Bulgaria.

The Ottoman Empire and the Kingdom of Romania took advantage of the situation and invaded Bulgaria too. The subsequent peace left Bulgaria with gains in territory but led to the loss of Eastern Thrace to the Ottomans and most of Macedonia to the Greeks. Defeat turned Bulgaria into its participation in the First World War on the side of the Central Powers since its Balkan enemies (Serbia, Greece, and Romania) were involved in the war on the side of the Entente.

During the war, King George I of Greece was assassinated in Thessaloniki by Alexandros Schinas. That generated a shift in the Greek foreign policy from clearly pro-Entente to neutrality, since the new king, Constantine I, unlike his father and his popular prime minister, Eleftherios Venizelos, was pro-German and tried to keep the country neutral in the upcoming world war. With the outbreak of war and the Entente's intervention in Macedonia, the conflict between king and the prime minister steadily deteriorated. That eventually led to the National Schism, which greatly contributed to the loss of the next war against Kemalist Turkey in Asia Minor, and dominated Greek politics for over a half of a century.

The outcome of the Balkan Wars caused a permanent break-up of the Russo-Bulgarian alliance and left Serbia and Montenegro as the only allies of Russia in the critical region.

== Notes ==
1. Bulgarian: Балкански съюз/Balkanski sŭyuz, Greek: Βαλκανική Συμμαχία/Balkaniki Symmachia, Serbian: Балкански савез/Balkanski savez
