= Ivanaj (surname) =

Ivanaj is an Albanian surname. Notable people with the surname include:

- Kreshnik Ivanaj (born 1982), Albanian football player
- Mirash Ivanaj (1891–1953), Albanian politician, minister and school director
- Nikolla bey Ivanaj (1879–1951), Albanian publisher and writer
