= Kolea =

Kolea may refer to:

- Koléa, Algeria
- Koléa District, Tipaza Province, Algeria
- The Hawaiian name (kōlea) for the Pacific golden plover
- The Hawaiian species of the plant genus Myrsine (also kōlea)

== People ==
- Sotir Kolea (1872–1945), Albanian folklorist
