= Filip Noga =

Albanian politician (d. 1917)

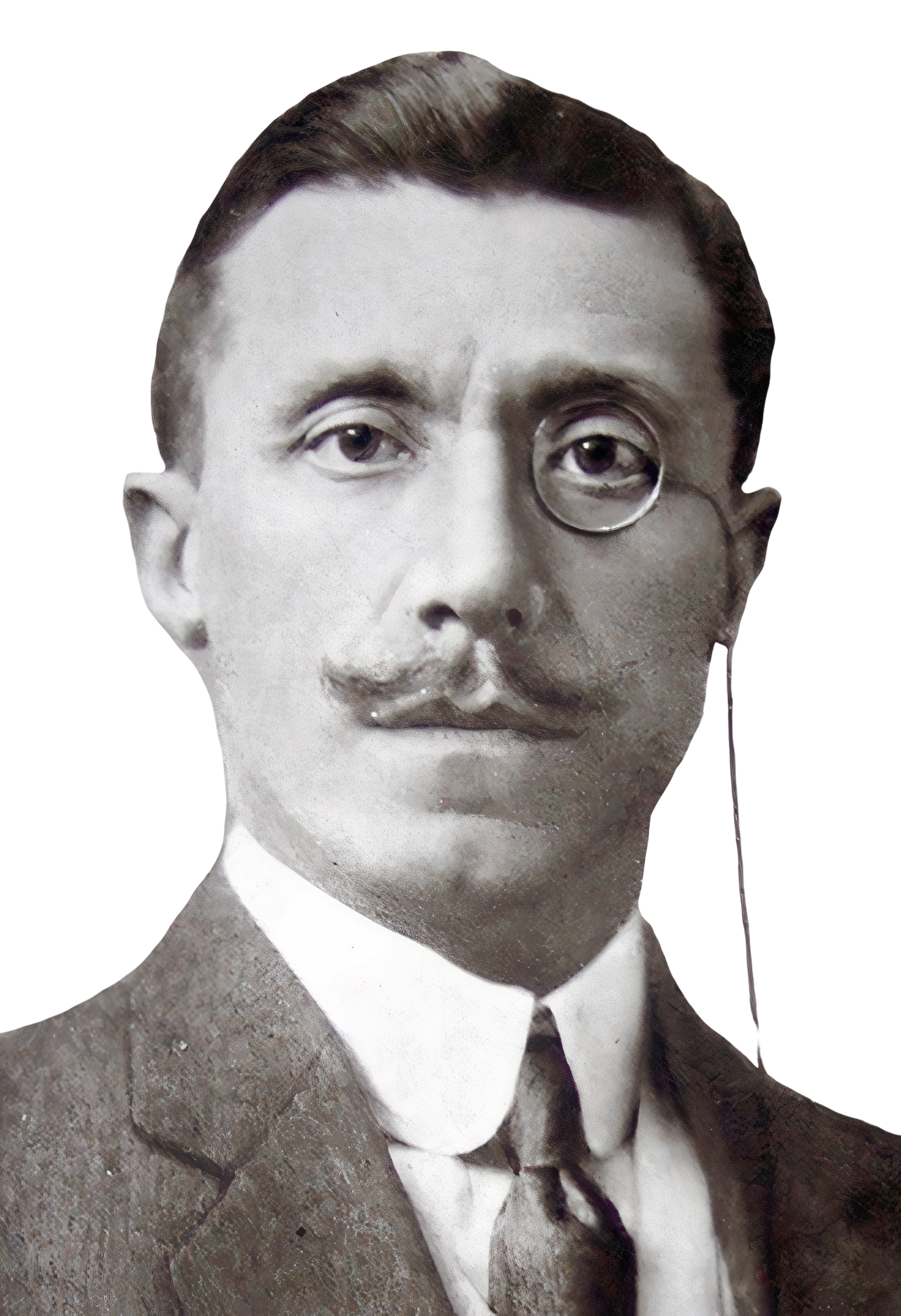
- Born: 1867; Shirokë, Vilayet of Scutari, Ottoman Albania
- Died: April 1917 (aged 49–50); Raguza, Austria-Hungary
- Other names: Philippe Nogga
- Occupation: Economist
- Known for: Albanian delegation at the Treaty of London

Filip Noga (Shiroka, 1867 or 1868 – Raguza, April 1917) was an Albanian politician, and Minister of Finance of the country for four months in 1914. He is also known as Philippe Nogga.

== Biography ==
He was born to a North Albanian Catholic family. He studied at a commercial secondary school in Wien from 1888 to 1890. He got a job in Istanbul in the financial sector. There he was involved with the Albanian patriotic circles. At the same time he wrote publications and he was the local representative of the French publishing house Liberté.

Following the Independent Albania's declaration, in November 1912, he moved back to his original country. Together with Mehmet Konica, Sotir Kolea, and Rasih Dino he was the fourth member of the Albanian delegation at the singing of Treaty of London, which shows the end of the First Balkan War, returning to Albanian in August 1913 to report to the Provisional Government. From 20 May to 3 September he was the Minister of Finance in Turhan Përmeti's Cabinet. Aubrey Herbert who traveled with him described him as a "linguist and musician". At the outbreak of World War I he moved to Wien. He died during a trip to Dubrovnik.

== Sources ==
- Saplár-Degovics Krisztián: Az albán nemzettéválás kezdetei (1878–1913): A Rilindja és az államalapítás korszaka. Budapest: ELTE BTK Történelemtudományok Doktori Iskola. 2010. 313., 316. o. ISBN 978-963-284-176-2
