= Black Society for Salvation =

Former Albanian nationalist group

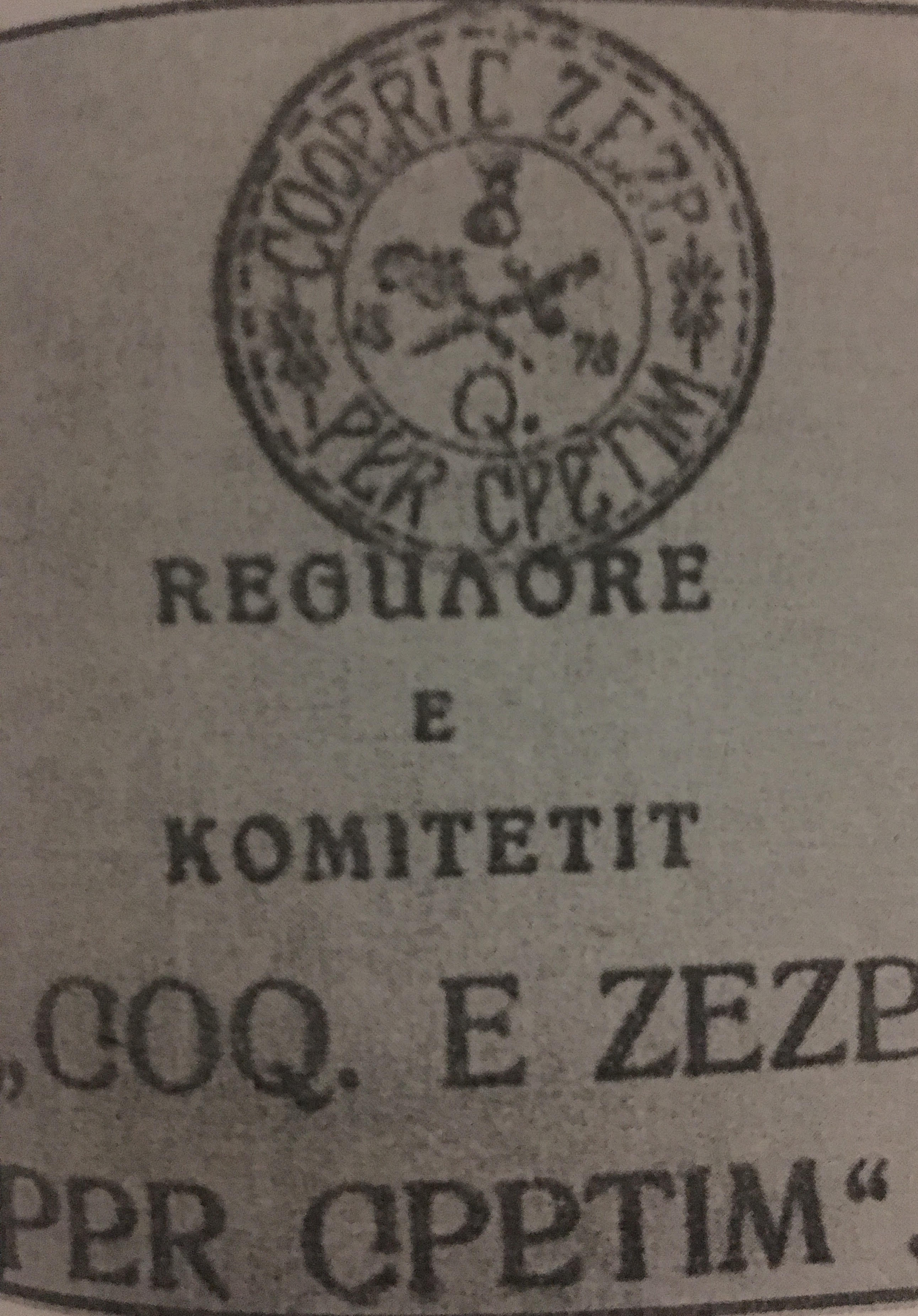

The Black Society for Salvation (Albanian: Shoqëria e zezë për shpëtim) was a secret Albanian nationalist society established in 1909. Its main task was to organize uprisings in southern Albania and Macedonia struggling for the unification of the four Ottoman vilayets with the substantial Albanian population (Kosovo Vilayet, Scutari Vilayet, Monastir Vilayet and Janina Vilayet) into one autonomous political unit with its own government and parliament. The members of the society considered the armed rebellions as legitimate means for achieving their aims.

== History ==
According to Nebi Dervishi, the society somehow dates back to 1878 in Istanbul. Dervishi explained that its seal contains a gun and dagger, with the name of the society on top, and number 18 and 78 (left and right), showing a connection with the League of Prizren period. The society got reorganized and got its real structure in 1909 in Monastir (today's Bitola in North Macedonia), in the same building which hosted the Alphabet Congress. Monastir was a cradle of irredentist movements, not only Albanian ones. The main contributor was Themistokli Gërmenji. The later, had several trips to visit the Albanian colonies, and found great support especially in the colonies of Sofia and Bucharest. Other main members of this were Thoma Avrami, Nikolla Ivanaj, and Pandeli Cale. The statute of the society (Albanian: Rregullore) was printed in a local print shop owned by the Qiriazi (Kyrias) family, and had 47 articles. The society established branches throughout the vilayets, in Korçë, Yannina, Gjirokastër, Vlorë, Filat, Delvinë, Përmet, Elbasan, Tirana, Ohër, Strugë, Dibër, Shkup, Shkodër, as well as in diaspora. The branches used a similar seal, without the letter "Q" that was present in the Monastir's one for distincting the "headquarters" (Albanian: Qendra). The intended name from the beginning was the "Black Hand" (Albanian: Dora e Zezë), in resonance with other secret societies that carried similar name in Europe, but was shifted later for avoiding misunderstandings regarding the society's programme and activity. A correspondence of Fan Noli to one of the founders, Nikolla Ivanaj, shows Noli's disagreement with these naming convention which sounded to him like the Mano Nera. Despite the efforts of Ivanaj for changing the name to "National Organization of Albania" (Albanian: Organizacionit Kombëtar të Shqipërisë), the name did not change due to objections from the branches.

The society had a secret character which conformed with that of the other secret societies throughout the world. Membership was allowed only to highly trusted persons. Only the initials were used instead of the real names. This makes its structure, membership, and activities more difficult to be study.

== Albanian revolts in 1911 and 1912 ==
The Albanian revolts in the period before the First Balkan War were organized mostly in the territory of the Kosovo vilayet. Isa Boletini, one of the leaders of the Albanian insurgents in Kosovo vilayet, wrote a proclamation on March 23, 1911 to the Albanians in the south to join the Albanians from the Kosovo vilayet in their uprising. He sent his emissaries on April 15, 1911 to pass his proclamation to the southern insurgents. One of the main tasks of Black Society for Salvation was to organize uprisings in the southern territories. The members of the society organized a meeting in Kolonjë. The meeting was attended by the emissaries from the Kosovo vilayet who brought the proclamation of Isa Boletini. The leaders of the society decided in that meeting to organize groups of armed rebels and to launch the uprising in the south in early June 1911. The society managed to establish committees in several towns including Korçë, Elbasan, Debar and Ohrid, but it failed to maintain control over them because each committee acted on its own direction.

During 1911 the Ottoman representatives managed to deal with the leaders of Albanian rebels separately, because they were not united and lacked central control. The Ottoman Empire first managed to pacify the northern Albanian malësorë (highlanders) from Scutari Vilayet reaching a compromise during a meeting in Podgorica. In order to resolve the problems in the south, the Ottoman representatives invited Albanian southern leaders to a meeting on August 18, 1911. They promised to meet most of their demands, like general amnesty, the opening of Albanian language schools, and the restriction that military service was to be performed only in the territory of the vilayets with substantial Albanian population. Other demands included requiring administrative officers to learn the Albanian language, and that the possession of weapons would be permitted.

When the Albanian revolt broke out in 1912 the Black Society for Salvation issued a proclamation to the Albanians from the south of Albania and the Monastir inviting them to participate in the revolt.

== First Balkan War ==
When the First Balkan War broke out, some members of the society met in Skopje on October 14, 1912, and composed the declaration which was delivered to the consuls of the Great Powers on October 16. With this declaration they informed the Great Powers that Albanians were going to go against the Balkan allies not to protect the Ottoman Empire, but to protect territorial integrity of the Albanian vilayet. They decided to send emissaries to malësorë in northern Albania, to organise the resistance in the whole region and to call for an Albanian national assembly. However, the fighting during the war prevented the emissaries from completing their tasks.

The Society's branch in Skopje also organized an unsuccessful assembly to declare the unification of the four vilayets on October 14, 1912. Ismail Qemali–who authored Albania's Declaration of Independence a month and a half later–realised that the fate of Albania would be decided in Vienna.

== See also ==
- Albanian National Awakening
- Albanian Vilayet
- Secret society
