= Albanian Congress of Trieste =

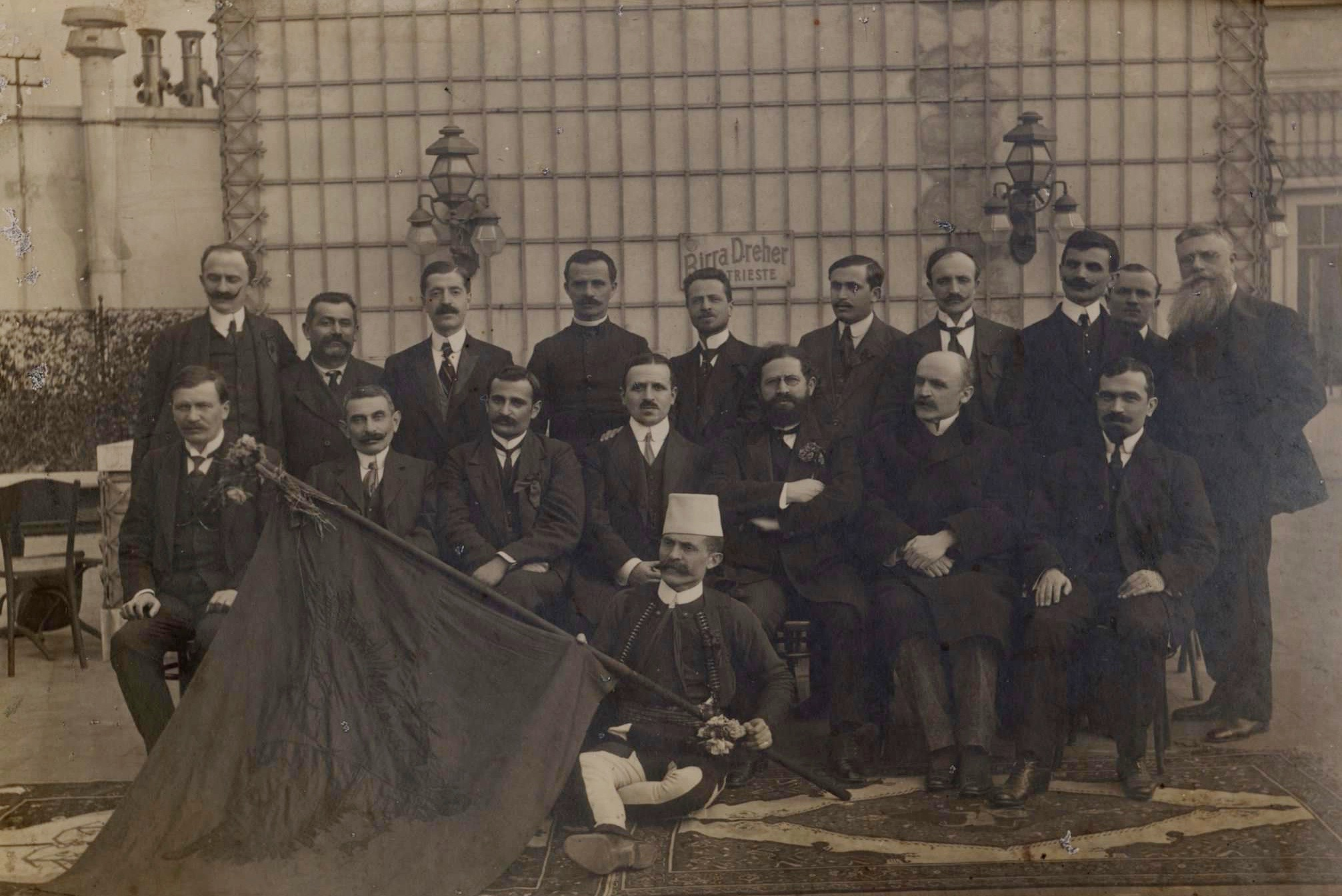
Main delegates of the congress

The Albanian Congress of Trieste (Albanian: Kongresi Shqiptar i Triestës) was a congress of Albanians held in Trieste, Austria-Hungary in the period between 27 February – 6 March 1913, organized by Faik Konica and Sotir Kolea with strong support from the Austrian authorities.

== Developments ==
The Provisional Government of Albania sent Kristo Meksi as its emissary to the Albanian Congress of Trieste. Baron Franz Nopcsa who participated in the work of the congress, published his notes on the congress that became of particular historical interest. The participants of the congress included Fan Noli, Albert Ghica, Baron Juan Pedro Aladro Kastriota, Nikolla Ivanaj, Giuseppe Schirò, and Terenzio Tocci. All Albanian colonies sent their delegates, they came from US, Romania, Bulgaria, Egypt, Italy, and Trieste. The Arbëreshë community also was present, bringing with Marchese D'Auletta and his sons. Hil Mosi was elected Chairman of the Congress, Faik Konitza and Dervish Hima as vice-chairmen, Fazil Toptani and Pandeli Evangjeli as secretaries. Marchese d'Auletta, one of the main candidates for the Albanian throne, was elected "Honorary President" of the congress.

The situation of the Aromanians in Albania was also discussed. In particular, the Aromanians demanded the establishment of an autonomous canton within Albania. It had also been proposed in the simultaneous London Conference of 1912–1913 that all lands inhabited by the Aromanians in the Balkans be given to Albania to protect them from Greek and Serbian assimilation. However, this did not happen, and the Aromanians were not given an autonomous canton in Albania as they did not live in compact areas within this unenlarged Albanian state.

== Candidates ==
The congress recognized the provisional government set up by Ismail Qemal bey Vlora and discussed the various candidates for the vacant throne. candidates were considered from various royal and noble families. Among the candidates being discussed at the time were Ferdinand François Bourbon Orléans-Montpensier of France, Albert Ghica of Romania, Wilhelm Karl, Duke of Urach from Württemberg, the Egyptian prince Ahmed Fuad, whose family had Albanian ties through his ancestor Muhammad Ali, and the Spanish nobleman Juan Pedro Aladro Kastriota, who through his paternal grandmother, claimed descent from the House of Kastrioti, thereby making him a descendant of the Albanian general and national hero Skanderbeg. Baron Nopzsa also proposed himself for the throne. Austria-Hungary promoted the congress, in particular to ensure the selection of a prince of its choice. Other candidates suggested included Prince Vittorio Emanuele, Count of Turin and cousin of King Victor Emmanuel III, Prince Arthur of Connaught and Prince Peter of Montenegro, youngest son of King Nikola.

== List of delegates ==
- Fazil Pasha Toptani
- Fuat Bey Toptani
- Haki Bey Qafzezi
- Izet Bey Ohri
- Mazhar Bey Toptani
- Ndrek Kiçi
- Nush Serreqi
- Don Pjetër Tusha
- Ahmet Gjyli
- Kolec Deda
- Çinto Çoba
- Luvigj Kodheli
- Mark Kakarriqi
- Zef Shantoja
- Filip Pema
- Stefan Ashiku
- Dervish Hima
- Zef Schiro
- Frano Chinigo
- Frano Muzaqi
- Luvigj Jakova
- Terenzio Tocci
- Frano G.Kastrioti
- Epaminonda Ballamaçi
- Marchese d’Auletta
- Kol Serreqi
- Pjetër Maurea
- At Foti Ballamaçi
- At Fan Noli
- Dr. Shunda
- Zef Kurti
- Pashko Muzhani
- Nush Proka
- Gasper Shkreli
- Jak Koçi
- Faik Be Konica
- Dimitri Shadima
- Moise Chinigo
- Filip Kraja
- Nikolla Ivanaj
- Lek Kiri
- Gjergj Shllaku
- Gjek Shestani
- Filip Matoja
- Mark Shestani
- Gjergj Zubçaj
- Jak Mrkuci
- Ferrara Gaetano
- Ferrara Giovanni
- Vasil Diamandi
- Engell Todri
- Jusuf Maliqi
- Tossun Halil
- Zef Kraja
- Jaja Aga Jakova
- Pjetër Giadri
- Ndoc Simoni
- Dr.Kristo Batazo
- Nyzhet Bey Vrioni
- Ferhat Bey Draga
- Pjetër Kakarriqi
- A.Bey Gjilani
- Ahmet Bey Pizrendi
- Islam Dibra
- Albert Ghica
- Doher Paço
- Ndrek Luka
- Shaqir Mustafa
- Mehmet Luli
- Shan Koleka
- Filip Bushati
- Ndoc Dema
- Hysen Draçini
- Gjon Hila
- Sotir Kolea
- Tom Stamolla
- Stefan Kaçulini
- Jak Vukaj
- Pal Gjergji
- Zef Marshani
- Cin Pema
- Pjetër Marashi
- Kol Vukaj
- Zef Gjergjaj
- Ndoc Marashi
- Orazio Iriani
- Anselmo Lorecchio
- Bajram Doklani
- Nicolla Paço
- Sokrat Shkreli
- Hysen Rahmi
- Qerim Be Begolli
- Ibrahim Kabaski
- Riza Voshtini
- Abdullah Struga
- Ali Shefqet Beu
- Pul Mashi
- Dimitri Ilo
- Mihal Lehova
- Filip Peciu
- Hil Mosi
- Spartaco Camarda
- Aleksi Dreneva
- Pjetër Koxhamani
- Spiro Arapi
- Filip Gjeka
- Thanas Kandili
- Pandeli Evangjeli
- Nikolla Candzu
- Vasil Dogani
- Filip Zadrima
- Stef Curani
- Loro Ashiku
- Hamdi Be Ohri
- Idriz Banushi
- Nush Paruca
- Dimitri Mola
- Pashko Spathari
- Hysen Avni
- Lonida Losi
- Kristo Meksi
- Baron Franz Nopcsa

== Decisions ==
The program of the congress had four points:

1. Preparing the request to be sent to the Great Powers for recognition of the political and economical independence of the Albania
2. Treaty of friendship and support of the Aromanian populations that lived near Albanian-inhabited regions and wanted to be included in the Albanian state.
3. Borders of future Albania
4. Discussion about the prince
