= Kristo Meksi =

Albanian politician

- Born: c. 1849; Labovë, Ottoman Empire (modern day Albania)
- Died: 1931 (aged 81–82); Tirana, Albania
- Education: Zosimaia School
- Occupation: Albanian politician
- Known for: Being one of the signatories of the Albanian Declaration of Independence
- Family: Meksi

Kristo Meksi (c. 1849–1931) (Kristo Meksi) was an Albanian politician of the early 20th century. He was one of the delegates of Albanian Declaration of Independence and also one of the first diplomats for Albania.

== Early life ==
Born in Labovë in 1849, he finished the Zosimaia School in Ioannina and afterwards he migrated to Romania. His patriotic activity started there. In 1906 he financed books and abecedaries in Albanian and collaborated with Thoma Çami to publish 2000 abecedaries in Gheg Albanian. In 1908, Meksi sent books to Musa Demi as a contribution for the start of the Filiates school in Albanian. Meksi was also between the contributors to the first Albanian teachers' school, the Shkolla Normale e Elbasanit, a teacher training institution that was founded on 1 December 1909 in Elbasan.

== Albanian Declaration of Independence ==
On 27 October 1912, along with Luigj Gurakuqi and other 25 Albanians, Meksi received in Bucharest Ismail Qemali, who was coming from Trieste to organize the Albanian community of Bucharest for the proclamation of the Albanian Declaration of Independence. Afterwards, Meksi travelled to Albania to participate in the Declaration and become one of its signatories, as the representative of the region of Ioannina. On 4 December 1912, Meksi was elected as one of the members of the Albanian Senate along with other founding fathers such as Mustafa Kruja, Myfti Vehbi Dibra, Eqrem Vlora, and Babë Dud Karbunara.

Meksi was the emissary of the Provisional Government of Albania to the Albanian Congress of Trieste on 16 February 1913, which secured international recognition for that government. One year later, in 1914, Meksi was an advisor of Prince Wilhelm Wied.

He worked in the Zogu government as an advisor. He died in Tirana in 1931 after he had become completely blind in his later years.
