= Nikolla bey Ivanaj =

Albanian journalist, publisher, and writer (1879–1951)

- Born: 1879
- Died: 1951 (aged 71–72)
- Other name: Nikola İvanay (in Turkish)
- Occupations: an Albanian journalist, publisher and writer
- Known for: Albanian national awakening

Nikolla bey İvanaj (Albanian: Nikollë Ivanaj, 1879 – 1951) was an Albanian journalist, publisher and writer from Montenegro. He was considered one of the "distinguished personalities of the most conscious Albanian nationalism" and was included in Albanian insurgents' main staff during 1911. Ivanaj was the first Albanian writer from Montenegro with his work The flower of eternity (Albanian: Lulet e pasosme) published in Tirana in 1943.

In the 1905–08 period, he published the newspaper Shpnesa e Shqypnisë (The Hope of Albania) in Dubrovnik, Trieste and Rome, getting financial aid from the different sides. For his publishing activities Ivanaj managed to gain financial support of Albert Ghica, a member of the Ghica noble family and pretender to the Albanian throne. He was one of the leaders of the Albanian National Committee which was founded in Podgorica at the beginning of 1911 and participated in organization of the Albanian uprising. His speech to the Italian Press Association held on January 26, 1911 is in some sources considered "an historical document of vital importance". Ivanaj was also one of the participants of the Albanian Congress of Trieste held in 1913. In January 1919 he started publishing another newspapers The New Time (Albanian: Koha e Re) in Shkodër which, on January 31, 1919, published the news about the death of Ismail Qemali.

During the Paris Peace Conference in 1919, he represented the Political Party (Albanian: Partise Politike) from United States. In 1923, together with his cousin Mirash Ivanaj he published the newspaper Bashkimi in Albania. and the weekly Republika from 1923 until 1925, both in Shkodër. During World War II, Ivanaj published an autobiographical book Historija e Shqipëniës së ré. Vuejtjet e veprimet e mija (English: History of Young Albania. My sufferences and my actions) in two parts published in 1943 and 1945 respectively, where he focused on the role of the catholic clergy. At last he left a volume of poetry before he died in 1951.

== Selected works ==
- Historija e Shqipëniës së ré - Vuejtjet e veprimet e mija (in Albanian), Tirana: Pjesa e parë, 1943, archived from the original on July 19, 2011

== Sources ==
- Elsie, Robert. "Baron Franz Nopcsa and his contribution to Albanian studies". Archived from the original on July 17, 2011. "Nikolla bey Ivanaj (1879- ca. 1948), Albanian publisher and writer from Montenegro"
- Clayer, Nathalie (2007). Aux origines du nationalisme albanais: la naissance d'une nation majoritairement musulmane en Europe. KARTHALA Editions. ISBN 978-2-84586-816-8.
