= Qerim Begolli =

Albanian nationalist

Qerim Begolli (born 1874 in İpek, Ottoman Empire, died 1945 in Peć, Yugoslavia) was an activist of both National Renaissance of Albania and the resistance of Albania during the Second World War.
Begolli was one of the delegates of Albanian Declaration of Independence.
Begolli participated as well in the Albanian Congress of Trieste in 1913.
He died in his birthplace, Peja, on 1945, killed by Yugoslav Partisans, at the end of World War II.
