= Hamdi Ohri =

Hamdi Ohri (also Hamdi Bey Qoku Ohri; February 4, 1872 in Ohrid, Ottoman Empire - November 24, 1938 in Tirana, Albanian Kingdom ) was a 19th-century Albanian rilindas and politician. He was one of the delegates of the Albanian Declaration of Independence.
He was as well a delegate at the Albanian Congress of Trieste in 1913.
