= Sotir Kolea =

Albanian folklorist and diplomat

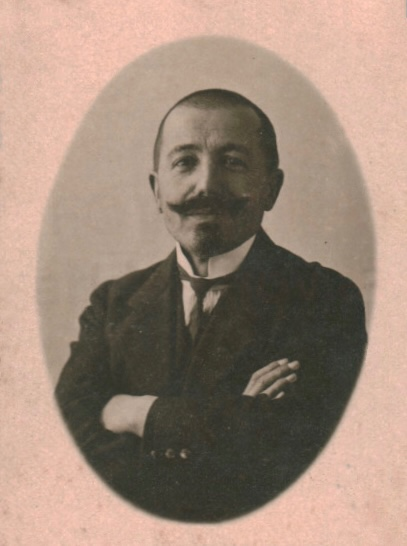
- Born: 4 September 1872; Goricë (Berat), Sanjak of Avlona, Ottoman Empire
- Died: 3 July 1945 (aged 72); Elbasan, Albania
- Known for: Albanian National Awakening; Bashkimi organization in Egypt; Congress of Trieste; National Library of Albania

Sotir Kolea (1872-1945) was an Albanian folklorist, diplomat and activist of the Albanian National Awakening. Along with Thoma Kacori he has been labeled as the Last of the Rilindas.

== Life ==
Sotir Kolea was born in the Goricë district of Berat, southern Albania (then part of the Ottoman Empire) on September 4, 1872. His father Kristo was a lawyer that worked as a legal counselor for the French company La Regie Des Tabacs, which held the monopoly on tobacco in the Ottoman Empire. At the age of nine he moved to Bitola, where his uncle Ilia, a tobacco merchant of the same company, lived. After graduating from the local Greek-language gymnasium, he was hired by La Regie Des Tabacs and worked in their Ohrid branch. In 1896 he worked as a teacher of Albanian language in the Albanian community of Kavala. Between 1899 and 1902 he was transferred to the Drama and Kavala branches of the company.

Later Kolea migrated to Egypt, where he was elected secretary of the local Bashkimi organization. After the Albanian Declaration of Independence, he took part of a delegation sent to the London Conference, together with Rasih Dino, Filip Noga, and Mehmet Konica. In 1913 he co-organized with Faik Konica the Albanian Congress of Trieste. After settling in Switzerland he published in Lausanne the newspaper L'Albanie from 1915 to 1919. In 1919-20 he was a member of the Albanian delegation to the Paris Peace Conference and the Franco-Albanian Administrative Council. In 1920 he migrated to Madagascar and later to France, where he lived in Marseille until 1927. From 1928 to 1937 he served as the director of the National Library of Albania, the volumes of which tripled during his term. According to some sources, Kolea was the one bringing the rare Codex of Constantine of Berat, part of the Christian literature known as "Kodikët e Shqipërisë" (Albanian Codex), discovered by Ilo Mitkë Qafëzezi. Since 1937 he had lived in Elbasan, where he died in 1945. His obituary was written by his close friend, the linguist Mahir Domi. In 1944 his work on Albanian proverbs Një tufë proverba was published in Tiranë. In 2002 Alfred Moisiu honoured him with the gold medal of the Naim Frashëri Order.
