= Jashar Erebara =

Albanian journalist and activist involved in the Albanian National Awakening

Jashar Sadik Erebara
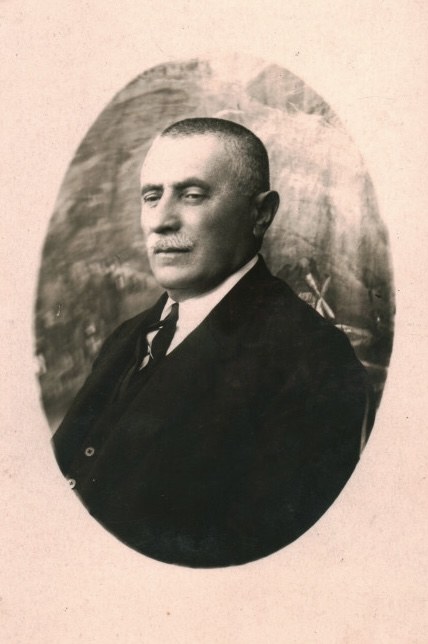
- Jashar Erebara
- Born: 1873; Podujevo, Ottoman Empire (present-day Kosovo)
- Died: 24 June 1953 (aged 79–80); Tirana, Albania
- Citizenship: Ottoman, Albanian
- Occupation: journalist
- Movement: Albanian National Awakening

Jashar Sadik Erebara (1873 – June 24, 1953) was a figure involved in the Albanian National Awakening.

During June 1900 an Albanian newspaper was published in Ottoman Turkish and Romanian at Bucharest with no connections to any Albanian societies. At the time Erebara and Dervish Hima, both students from Istanbul University were its editors and the paper advocated for an independent Albania ruled by a foreign prince and protected by the Great Powers. The newspaper later ceased publication due to a lack of money and complaints from the Ottoman embassy in Romania.

In Paris, Erebara participated in the Congress of Ottoman Opposition (1902) organised by Prince Sabahaddin calling for reforms, minority rights, revolution and European intervention in the empire. Erebara and Hima, another delegate of the 1902 Congress both published a Turkish-Albanian journal for Shpresa, an Albanian nationalist society. The activities of Erebara had caused annoyance to Ottoman authorities as he had advocated in Serbia for Albanian nationalism and Young Turk (CUP) ideas. By 1904 a secret agreement between the Ottoman ambassador and private secretary of the Serbian king was reached that called for the expulsion of Erebara by Serbia and pardon of three arrested Montenegrins in the Ottoman empire.

In 1905 Erebara published a newspaper in Belgrade called Albanija. He established a weekly newspaper, Shkupi, at Skopje in 1911.
