= Independent Albania =

1912–1914 republic in Europe

Albania Shqipëria (Albanian)
- 1912–1914
- Flag Coat of arms
- Anthem: Himni i Flamurit "Hymn to the Flag"
- Map of the de jure boundaries of Albania according to the London Conference (1913) in white
- Status: Self-proclaimed sovereign state
- Capital: Vlora
- Common languages: Albanian
- Demonym: Albanian
- Government: Parliamentary republic
- Head of State
  - 1912–1914: Ismail Qemali
- Prime Minister
  - 1912–1914: Ismail Qemali
- Legislature: Assembly of Vlorë
  - Upper house: Senate of Albania
- History
  - Independence declared: 28 November 1912
  - Prince accepted the throne: 21 February 1914
- Currency: No official state currency, 25 different foreign currencies were in use
Preceded by
Janina Vilayet
Scutari Vilayet
Kosovo Vilayet
Manastir Vilayet
Succeeded by
Principality of Albania

Independent Albania (Albanian: Shqipëria e Pavarur) was a parliamentary state declared in Vlorë (at the time part of Ottoman Empire) on 28 November 1912 during the First Balkan War. Its assembly was constituted on the same day while its government and senate were established on 5 December 1912.

The delegation of Albania submitted a memorandum to the London Conference of 1913 requesting international recognition of independent Albania. At the beginning of the conference it was decided that the region of Albania would be under Ottoman suzerainty but with an autonomous government. The requests by the delegation for recognition based on the ethnic rights of Albanians were rejected and the Treaty of London was signed on 30 May 1913, partitioning a major part of the claimed lands between Serbia, Greece and Montenegro, leaving as independent territory only a central region, which was put under the protection of the Great Powers. The ambassadors of six Great Powers met again on 29 July 1913 and decided to constitute a new state, the Principality of Albania, as a constitutional monarchy. Finally, with the Treaty of Bucharest being signed in August 1913, this new independent state was established, leaving about 40% of the ethnic Albanian population outside its borders.

== Name ==
The name of the state used in the text of declaration of independence of Albania is Shqipëria (English: Albania). It is also referred to as the "independent Albania" (Albanian: Shqipëria e Mosvarme), the "Albanian State" (Albanian: Shteti Shqiptar) or the "independent state of Albania" (Albanian: Shteti i pavarur shqiptar).

== Political system ==
The independent Albania established on 28 November 1912 is the first Albanian state in modern history. It was a parliamentary state. Some sources refer to it as the Republic of Albania or the Albanian Republic.

Albania became an independent state through four constitutional decisions of the Assembly of Vlorë made on 28 November 1912:

1. Albania, as of today, should be on her own, free and independent
2. under a provisional government
3. that a council of elders (senate) be elected to assist and supervise the government
4. a commission is to be sent to Europe to defend Albanian interests among the Great Powers

== Territory ==
The authority of the state was limited to the regions of Vlorë, Berat and Lushnjë. The claimed territory was much larger than the territory of contemporary Albania and than the territory over which the Provisional Government exercised its power. It comprised the territories of Kosovo Vilayet, Monastir Vilayet, Shkoder Vilayet and Janina Vilayet. The Treaty of London, signed on 30 May 1913, reduced the territory of Albanian state to its central regions after partitioning a significant part of territory claimed by Albania between the Balkan allies (a major part of the northern and western area was given to the Serbia and Montenegro while the southern region of Chameria became part of Greece). Kosovo was given to Serbia at the London treaty at the insistence of Russia.

During the First Balkan War the kingdoms of Greece, Serbia, Bulgaria and Montenegro aspired to incorporate the entire region into their states (completely denying the Albania's independence), so most of the captured territory was occupied by their armies. Independent Albania did however exercise control over one pocket of land which included Vlorë, Berat, Fier and Lushnjë.

== History ==
=== Albanian Vilayet ===
Albanian rebels capturing Skopje in August 1912

Until September 1912, the Ottoman government intentionally kept Albanians divided within four ethnically heterogeneous vilayets to prevent Albanian national unification. The reforms introduced by the Young Turks provoked the Albanian Revolt of 1912 which lasted from January to August 1912. In January 1912, Hasan Prishtina, Albanian deputy in the Ottoman parliament, publicly warned members of the parliament that the policy of the Young Turks' government would lead to a revolution in Albania. The Albanian revolt was successful and until August 1912 rebels managed to gain control over whole Kosovo vilayet (including Novi Pazar, Sjenica, Pristina and even Skopje), a part of the Scutari Vilayet (including Elbasan, Përmet and Leskovik), Konitsa in Janina Vilayet and Debar in Monastir Vilayet. The Ottoman government ended the Albanian revolt on 4 September 1912 by accepting all demands related to establishing an unified autonomous system of administration and justice for Albanians within one vilayet—the Albanian vilayet.

=== First Balkan War ===
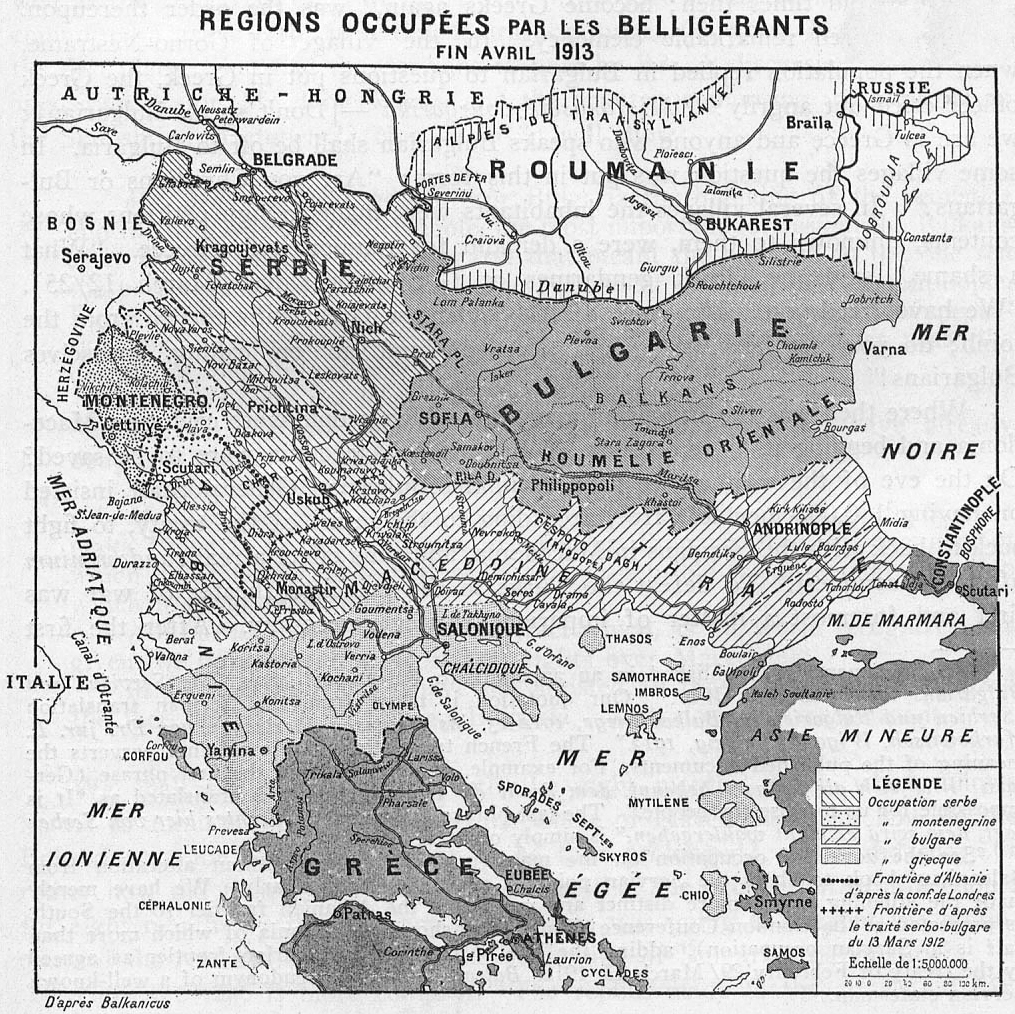
Situation in the Balkans during the First Balkan War, in 1914.

The success of the Albanian revolt sent a strong signal to the neighbouring countries that the Ottoman Empire was weak. Besides, the Kingdom of Serbia opposed the plan for an Albanian vilayet, preferring a partition of the European territory of the Ottoman Empire among the four Balkan allies. In the meantime it was agreed that the conquered territory was to have the status of a condominium.

Albanian leaders, including Faik Konitza and Fan Noli, organized a large meeting on 7 October 1912 in Boston. They decided that Albanians should "unite fully with the Ottoman government against the enemies of the Empire" because "if Turkey is defeated, the Balkan states would shred Albania." That decision was risky, because if the Ottomans were defeated, Albanian participation in the Balkan war on the Ottoman side would serve as justification for the Balkan allies to partition Albania as an Ottoman province. Albanians who were mobilized in the Ottoman army fought for their country rather than for the Ottoman Empire.

During the First Balkan War the combined armies of the Balkan allies overcame the numerically inferior and strategically disadvantaged Ottoman armies and achieved rapid success. They occupied almost all the remaining European territories of the Ottoman Empire including the territory of the Albanian Vilayet.

At the beginning of November 1912, Albanian leaders appealed to Emperor Franz Joseph I of Austria-Hungary, explaining the difficult situation in their country because parts of the four vilayets were also claimed by the Balkan League who were present on the disputed lands. Austria-Hungary and Italy strongly opposed the arrival of Serbian army on the Adriatic Sea because they perceived it as a threat to their domination of the Adriatic and feared that a Serbian Adriatic port could become a Russian base. Ismail Kemal, who had been an Albanian deputy in the Ottoman parliament, secured the support of Austria-Hungary for the autonomy of Albania within the Ottoman Empire, but not for its independence.

=== All-Albanian Congress ===
Ismail Kemal invited the representatives of all parts of Albanian Vilayet to attend the All-Albanian Congress held in Vlorë on November 28, 1912. At the beginning of the session, Kemal referred to the threatened Albanian rights gained during the Albanian revolts in the previous four years, and explained to the participants of the congress that they should do whatever was necessary to save Albania. After his speech they began by checking the documents because it was decided that each kaza of Albanian Vilayet would be counted as one vote, regardless of the number of its delegates. Participants of this congress are regarded as Founding Fathers of Albania.

=== After the declaration of independence ===
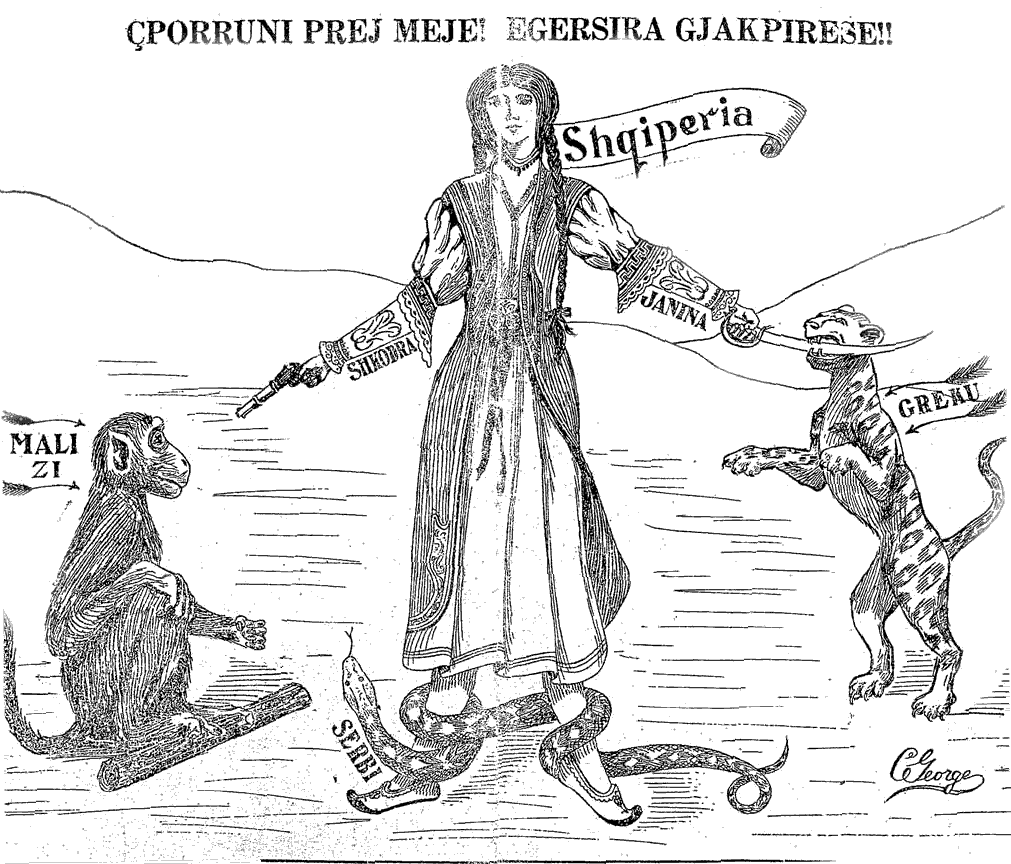
Caricature published in February 1913 shows Albania defending itself from neighboring countries. Montenegro is represented as a monkey, Greece as a leopard attacking Ioannina and Serbia as a snake. Text in Albanian: "Flee from me! Bloodsucking beasts!"

The first notification about the proclaimed independence was sent to the command of Serbian Army in Ohrid. On 29 November 1912, the army of the Kingdom of Serbia captured Durrës without any resistance and established Durrës County with four districts (Serbian: срез): Durrës, Lezha, Elbasan and Tirana. New Serbian authorities were faced with big difficulties in governing a new county because all secluded army garrisons with small number of soldiers were destroyed in a couple of days. Although some tribal chieftains proposed to organize an armed resistance against troops of Serbia in the occupied parts of Albania, the provisional government of the Independent Albania decided to avoid unnecessary casualties and concluded agreement (besa) to maintain harmony in occupied territory.

The international relations of Albania began to function on a state level after it was proclaimed independent and the first diplomatic efforts of its government were requests for the international recognition of the Albanian state. In December 1912, a delegation of Albania submitted a memorandum to the London Conference of 1913 insisting on the ethnic rights of Albanians and requested an international recognition of the independent Albania composed of Kosovo, western Macedonia including Skopje and Bitola and the whole territory of Epirus up to Arta.

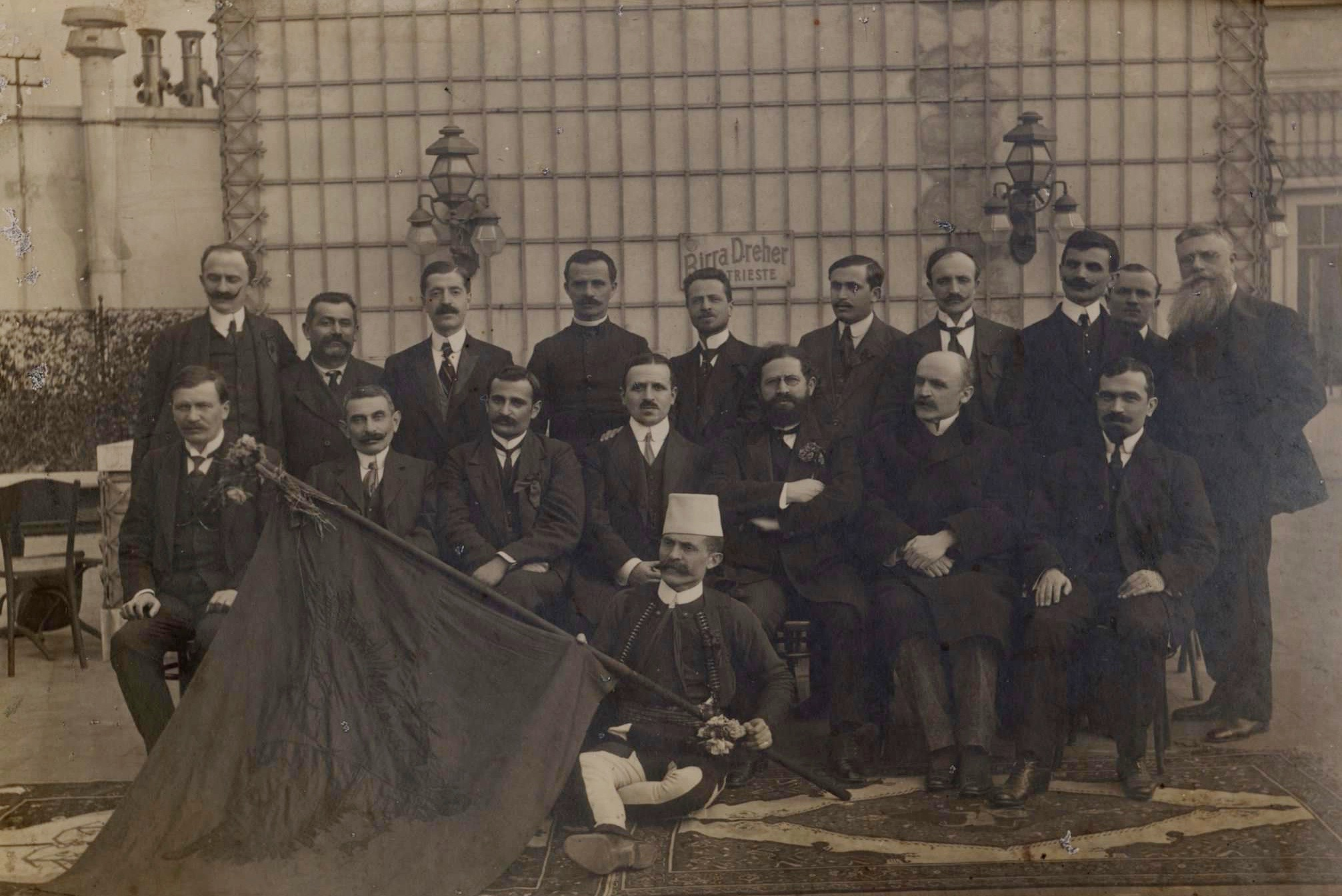
The main delegates of the Albanian Congress of Trieste with their national flag, 1913.

About 120 notable politicians and intellectuals from Albania attended the Albanian Congress of Trieste from 27 February to 6 March 1913 and requested from the Great Powers a recognition of the political and economical independence of Albania. Isa Boletini and Ismail Kemal travelled to London in March 1913 to obtain Britain's support for their new country. On March 6 Ioannina was captured by forces of the Kingdom of Greece. In March 1913 a group of 130 (or 200) soldiers of the Kingdom of Serbia were killed near Prizren by Albanian irregulars in act of revenge for repression of Serbian army.

In April 1913 the army of the Kingdom of Serbia retreated from Durrës but remained in other parts of Albania. On the other hand, Kingdom of Montenegro managed to capture Shkodër on 23 April 1913 after six months of siege. However, when the war was over, the Great Powers did not award the city to the Kingdom of Montenegro, which was compelled to evacuate it in May 1913.

In May 1913, delegates of Albania in London requested a British sovereign and considered offering the Albanian throne to Aubrey Herbert.

=== London Treaty ===
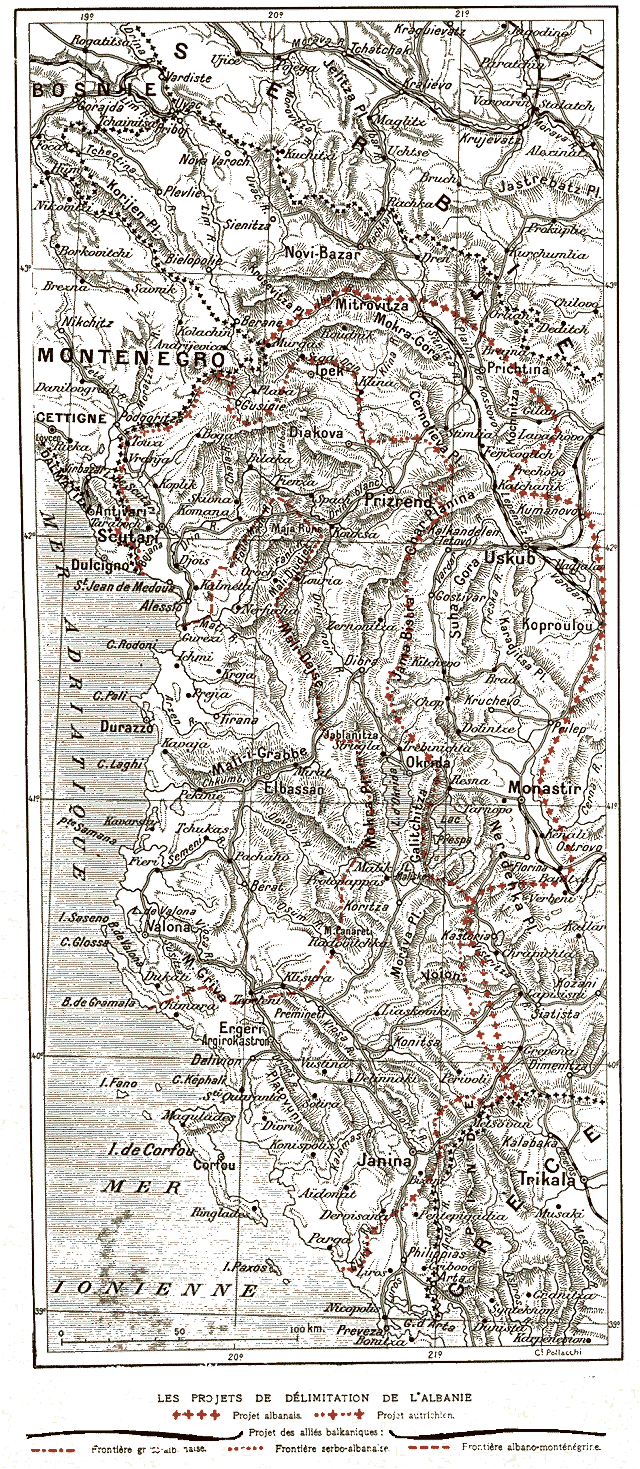
Various borders for Albania proposed during the London Conference of 1912–13

The Great Powers did not fulfil the requests for recognition of Albania. At the beginning of the London conference in December 1912 the ambassadors of all six Great Powers rejected the plan for establishing an independent Albania. Instead, they decided that Albania would be under Ottoman suzerainty but with an autonomous government. After it became obvious that Ottoman Empire would lose all of Macedonia and its territorial connection with Albania, the Great Powers realized they had to change their decision.

The Treaty of London, signed on 30 May 1913, partitioned significant part of territory claimed by Albania, regardless its ethnic composition, between the Balkan allies reducing the territory of Albania to its central regions.

=== After the London treaty ===
In September 1913 independent Albania secretly supported and helped Ohrid–Debar Uprising because Ismail Qemali thought that independent Albania was too weak to openly confront the Kingdom of Serbia. Qemali ordered a simultaneous attack of the Albanian forces led by Isa Boletini and Bajram Curri to the region of Prizren. Peshkopi was captured on 20 September 1913. Local Albanians and Bulgarians expelled the Serbian army and officials, creating a front line 15 km east of Ohrid. A local administration was set up in Ohrid. The Serbian Army of 100,000 regulars suppressed the uprising in several days. Thousands were killed, and tens of thousands of local inhabitants fled for Bulgaria and Albania to save their lives. According to the Report by the International Commission of the Carnegie Endowment for International Peace the number of Albanians who took refuge was 25,000.

On 16 October 1913, Essad Pasha Toptani—who also had been an Albanian deputy in the Ottoman parliament—established the Republic of Central Albania with its administrative centre in Durrës. Toptani's state was also short-lived and unrecognised, with its territory bounded by rivers Mat in the North and Shkumbin in the South. It further partitioned already truncated territory of Albania. Toptani contested the status of the provisional government and denied that Kemal's government was legitimate, emphasizing that it was "the personal creation of a number of men." In July 1913 Ismail Kemal attempted to calm Toptani by appointing him Minister of Interior, but with no avail. Toptani was also, like Kemal little earlier, forced by Great Powers to step away on 1 February 1914.

== Politics ==
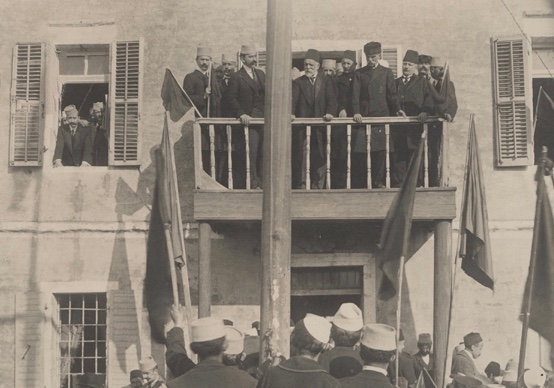
Ismail Kemal and his cabinet during the celebration of the first anniversary of independence in Vlorë on 28 November 1913

=== Declaration of Independence ===
At the beginning of the session Ismail Kemal emphasized that the only way to prevent division of the territory of Albania between the Balkan allies was to establish it as independent state, separated from Ottoman Empire. Kemal's proposal was unanimously accepted and it was decided to sign the declaration of independence of Albania in the name of the constituted Assembly of Vlorë (Albanian: Kuvendi i Vlorës) which members were representatives of all the regions of Albania. By the declaration of Albanian independence the Assembly of Vlorë rejected the autonomy granted by the Ottoman Empire to the Albanian Vilayet, projected a couple of months earlier. The consensus was made for the complete independence.

In Vlora, on the 15th/28th of November 1328/1912.
Following the speech made by the President, Ismail Kemal Bey, in which he spoke of the great perils facing Albania today, the delegates have all decided unanimously that Albania, as of today, should be on her own, free and independent.

— Albanian Declaration of Independence

The sitting was then suspended and members of newly constituted National Assembly went to the house of Ismail Kemal who raised the flag of Skanderbeg on the balcony of his house, in front of the gathered people.

=== Government and Senate ===
The establishment of the government was postponed for the fourth session of the Assembly of Vlorë, held on 4 December 1912, until representatives of all regions of Albania arrived to Vlore. During that session members of the assembly established the Provisional Government of Albania. It was a government that consisted of ten members, led by Ismail Kemal, until his resignation on 22 January 1914. Assembly established the Senate (Albanian: Pleqësi) with advisory role to the government, consisted of 18 members of Assembly.

Ismail Kemal was appointed as the first prime minister of independent Albania. On the same session held on 4 December 1912 the assembly appointed the other members of the government:

- Prime Minister (and de facto head of the state): Ismail Kemal
- Deputy Prime Minister: Dom Nikollë Kaçorri
- Minister of Foreign Affairs (provisionally): Ismail Kemal
- Minister of Internal Affairs: Myfit Bej Libohova (in July 1913 Essad Pasha Toptani)
- Minister of War: General Mehmet Pashë Derralla (from Tetovo in Macedonia)
- Minister of Finance: Abdi Toptani
- Minister of Justice: Petro Poga
- Minister of Education: Luigj Gurakuqi
- Minister of Public Services: Mit’hat Frashëri (from Ioannina in Greece)
- Minister of Agriculture: Pandeli Cale
- Minister of Posts and Telegraphs: Lef Nosi

=== Public services ===
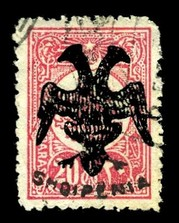
Post stamp of the independent Albania, 16 June 1913.

A week after the independent Albania was proclaimed, its first Ministry of Posts and Telegraphs was established with Lef Nosi as its minister. Independent Albania took over the Ottoman post offices and placed significant efforts to make the Albanian postal service identifiable. Post offices of the independent Albania used the Ottoman postal seals until the end of April and the beginning of May 1913, when they were replaced by the postal seals of Albania with the name of the place in the upper part of the seal and the name of the state, Albania (Shqipenie), in the bottom part. On 5 May 1913 the first postage stamps of Albania were put into circulation. On 7 July 1913 Albania submitted an official request to the Universal Postal Union (UPU) for membership. The request was rejected, and Albania would become a member of UPU only in 1922.

After Albania achieved its independence from the Ottoman Empire in 1912, its legal system continued to function under the Ottoman Civil Code (Mejelle) for some time.

Since 28 November 1912 until 1926 the Albanian government did not mint any currency. Transactions occurred in gold and silver coins of other countries, whereas the official unit of account was the franc of the Latin Monetary Union.

Until 1912, the education system in Albania depended on religious institutions. Muslims attended Ottoman schools, the Orthodox population attended Greek or Armenian schools, Catholics attended Italian or Austrian schools, whereas in the districts near Slavic states, the population attended Serbian or Bulgarian schools. When Albania was declared independent in 1912 its government took measures to close foreign schools and to open Albanian ones. From 1912 to 1914, there was not much opportunity and time for progress of national education, because of the political instability and the breakout of World War I. The first laic school was opened in Shkoder in 1913.

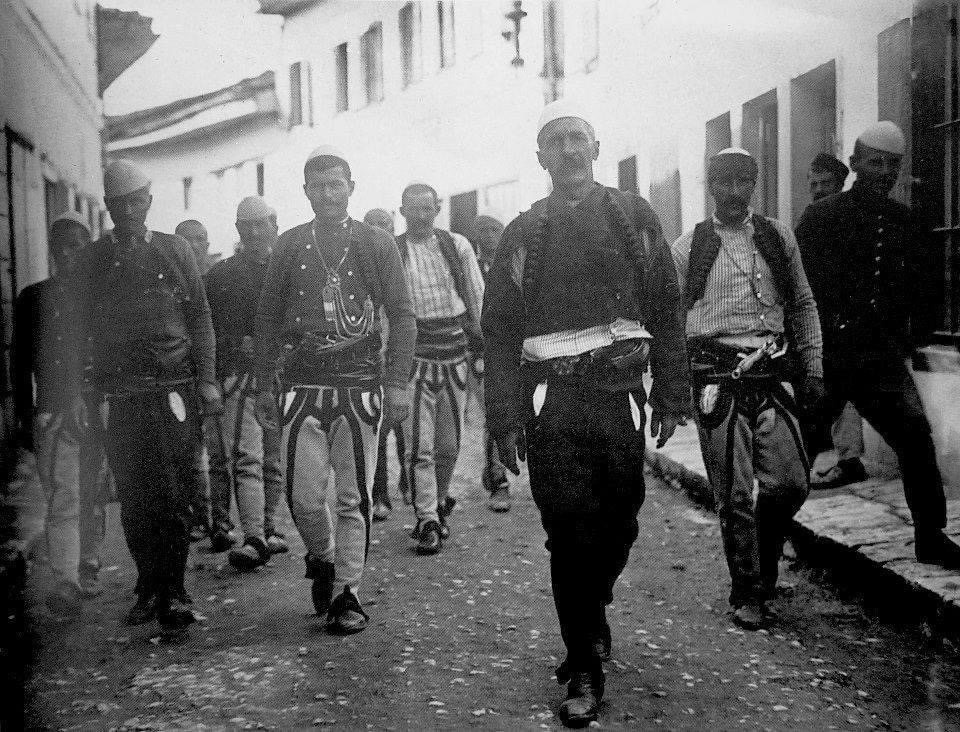
Isa Boletini with men from Kosovo in the streets of Vlorë in 1912

A group of fighters from Kosovo led by Isa Boletini were the first nucleus of the armed forces of Albania established on 4 December 1912. The Ottoman forces backed the government of Independent Albania until the beginning of 1913, although the Ottomans did not recognize its independence.

Law enforcement forces (gendarmerie and Albanian Police) of the independent Albania were established on 13 January 1913. About 70 former Ottoman officers were engaged as officers of the law enforcement units of the independent Albania. The first director of the Albanian Police was Halim Jakova-Gostivari, whereas the first commanders of the gendarmerie were Alem Tragjasi, Hysni Toska, Sali Vranishti, and Hajredin Hekali. The Albanian Police uniforms was colored in gray and green, and the collars were red and black.

== Economy ==
The economy of Albania after it became independent state in 1912 was based on primitive agriculture and livestock, with no significant industry, and little international trade. Starting in 1912, Albania began activities aimed at implementing an agrarian reform, which would transfer ownership of the arable land from the big landowners to the peasants.

== Aftermath ==
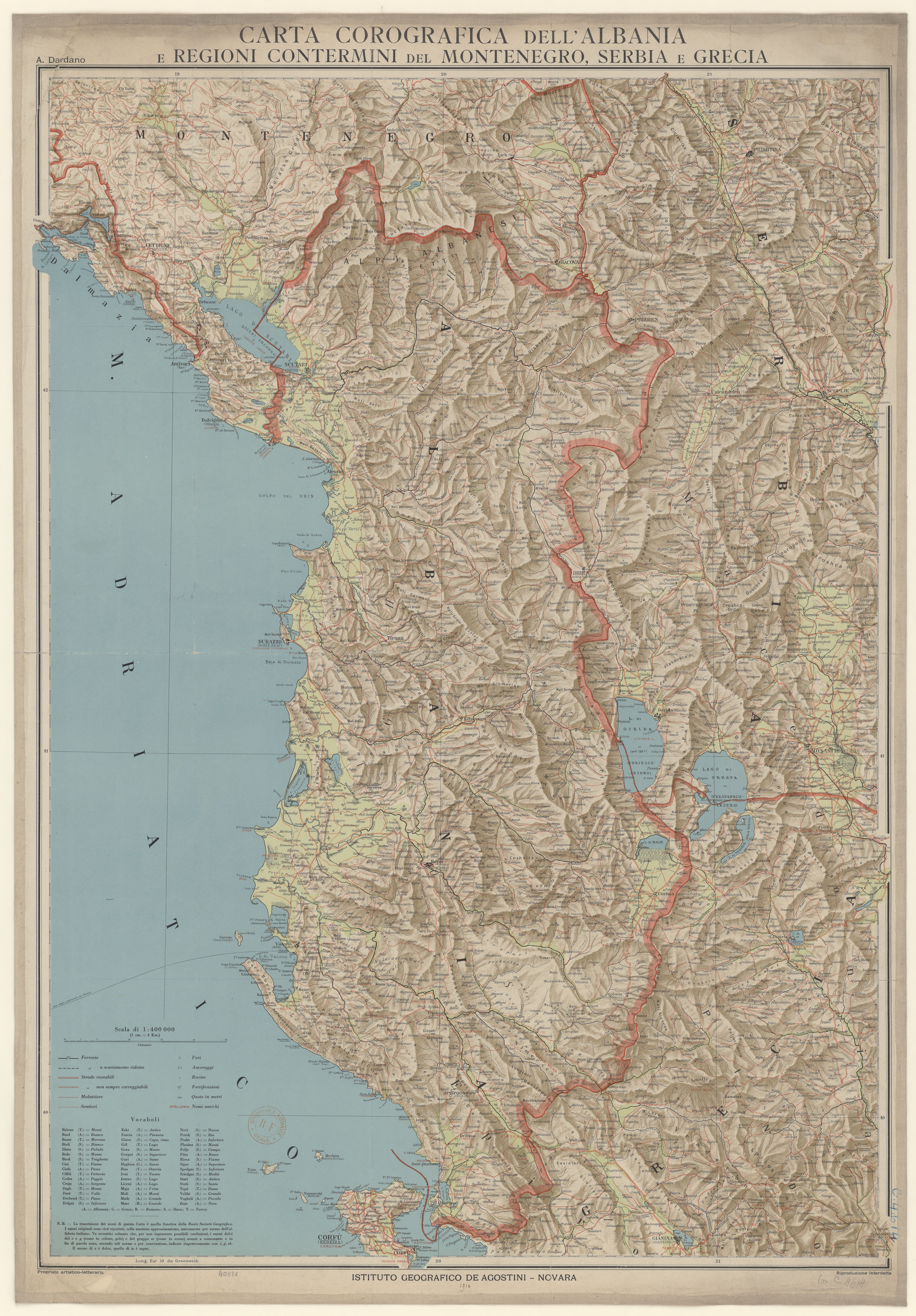
Borders of the Principality of Albania, recognized by the Treaty of Bucharest.

The Treaties of London and Bucharest dealt with the final territorial adjustments arising out of the conclusion of the Balkan Wars. After the London treaty has been signed the ambassadors of six Great Powers decided to constitute a new state, Albania, as hereditary principality.

Point 1. Albania is constituted as an autonomous, sovereign and hereditary principality by right of primogeniture, guaranteed by the six Powers. The sovereign will be designated by the six Powers.

— Decision of the ambassadors of the six Great Powers made on 29 July 1913 during 54th meeting of the Conference of the Ambassadors

The Great Powers refused to recognize the Provisional Government of Albania and, instead, organized the International Commission of Control (ICC) to take care of the administration of the newly established principality until the arrival of the new monarch. The first law enforcement agency of the new principality was the International Gendarmerie.

The treaty of Bucharest, signed on 10 August 1913, established internationally recognized Albania as an independent state. The creation of Albanian state in 1913 after the Balkan Wars was their only political result.

A plot by the Young Turk government and led by Bekir Fikri to restore Ottoman control over Albania through the installment of an Ottoman-Albanian officer Ahmed Izzet Pasha as monarch was uncovered by the Serbs and reported to the ICC. Ismail Kemal supported the plot for military assistance against Serbia and Greece. The ICC allowed their Dutch officers serving as the Albanian Gendarmerie to declare a state of emergency and stop the plot. They raided Vlorë on 7–8 January 1914, discovering more than 200 Ottoman troops and arrested Fikri. During Fikri's trial the plot emerged and an ICC military court under Colonel Willem de Veer condemned him to death and later commuted to life imprisonment, while Kemal and his cabinet resigned. After Kemal left the country, turmoil ensured throughout Albania.

After a display of independence of Kemal's government, the Great Powers were angered and the International Commission of Control forced Kemal to step aside and leave Albania.

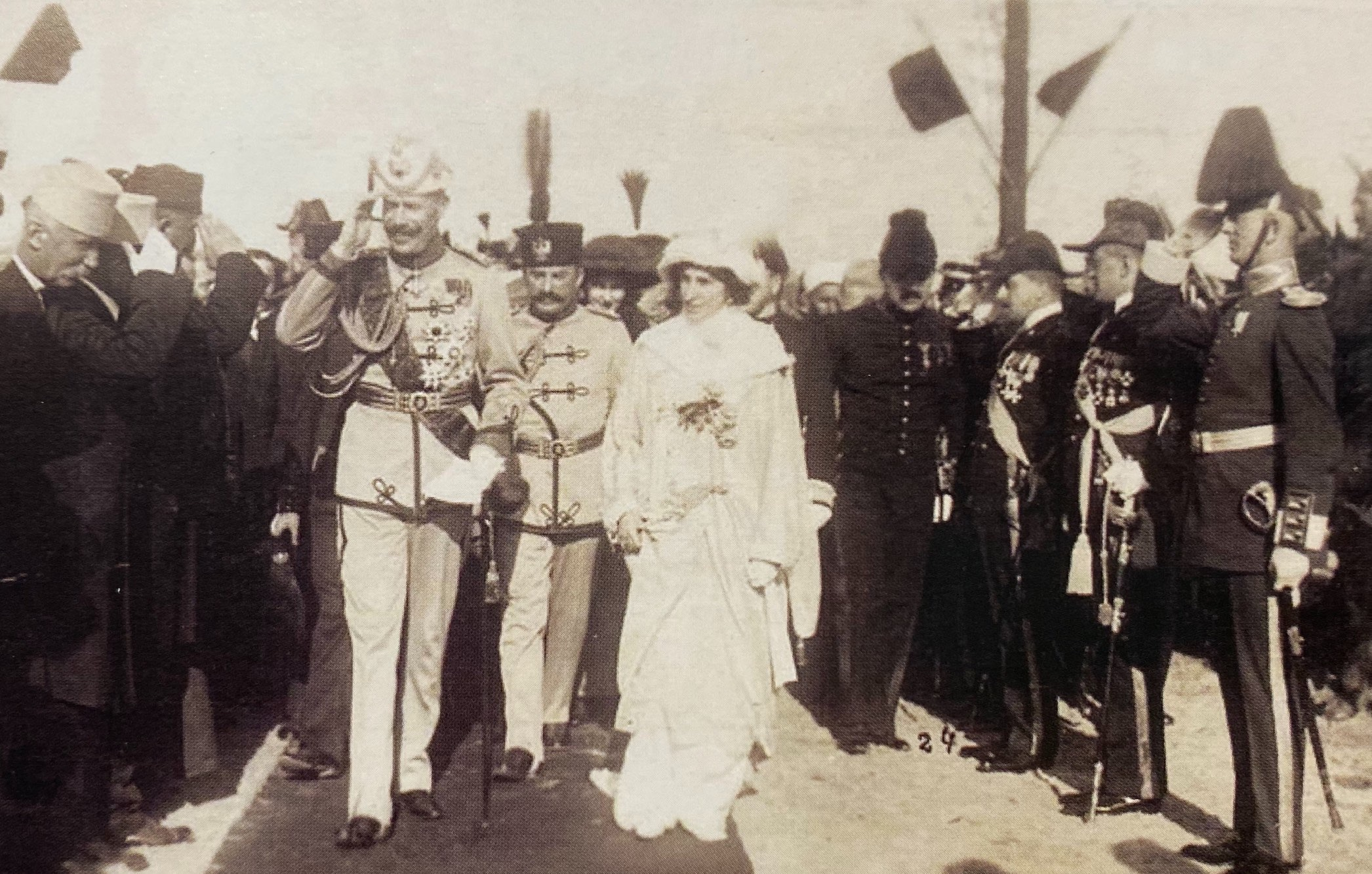
William, Prince of Albania and his wife Princess Sophie of Albania arriving in Durrës, Albania on 7 March 1914.

In 1914, after a gradual assumption of the administration of the country, the International Commission of Control prepared a draft of the constitution (Albanian: Statuti Organik) with 216 articles. It was a basis for establishment of the National Assembly with power of legislation in Albania, which was designed as a hereditary constitutional monarchy. According to the constitution, the new principality would have, with few exceptions, the same administrative organization as during the Ottoman Empire suzerainty. It would be partitioned on seven administrative districts, each of which would choose three representatives for the national assembly by direct suffrage. The prince would nominate ten representatives and the heads of the all three religions (Islam, Orthodox and Catholic) would be also representatives in the national assembly, which would have four-year terms. The Council of Ministres, with executive powers, would be appointed by the prince. After monarchical form of government has been installed by the International Commission of Control in 1914 the political system of Albania became a monarchy.

The biggest group of Albanians who were left outside of the new state were Albanians from Kosovo, the cradle of the 19th century Albanian nationalism. Nazi Germany and Fascist Italy exploited the discontent of the Albanians about the inaccurate ethnic borders.

== Commemorations ==
Since Albania was declared independent on November 28, 1912, every 28 November is commemorated by all Albanians (wherever they live in the world) as their Independence Day. In the Republic of Albania, the day is celebrated as a public holiday. In the Republic of Kosovo, the day has been an official public holiday since a 2011 decision of Prime Minister Hashim Thaçi's cabinet.

The proceedings of the conference dedicated to the 70th anniversary of Albania's independence organized in November 1982 by the Academy of Sciences of Albania were entitled "National forces against imperialist dictate in the organization of the Albanian State, 1912-1914: Report". In 1992 the Academy of Sciences of Albania organized a conference dedicated to 80th anniversary of independent Albania and published a document titled: "The organization of government, judicial system and military of Albania (1912-1914)". Year 2012 is a year of the centennial of the Independence of Albania. The opening day of the year-long celebration was on 17 January 2012 during a solemn ceremony held at the Parliament of Albania and attended by Albanian representatives from the Republic of Kosovo, Macedonia, Montenegro, Preševo and Bujanovac, who were joined that day like they were 100 years ago.

The Ministry of Tourism, Cultural Affairs, Youth and Sports announced on 22 December 2011 the "International Competition for the accomplishment in sculpture of the monumental work dedicated to the “100 anniversary of the Declaration of Independence of the Albanian State: 28 November 1912 – 28 November 2012”".

== Gallery ==
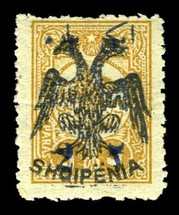
16 June 1913

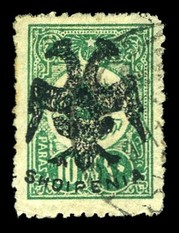
16 June 1913

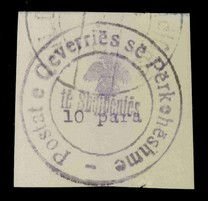
25 October 1913

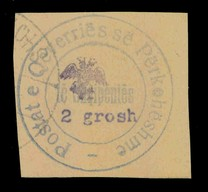
25 October 1913

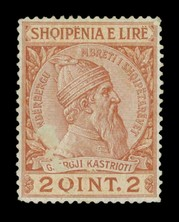
1 December 1913

== See also ==
- League of Prizren
- Black Society for Salvation
- Massacres of Albanians in the Balkan Wars

== Sources ==
- Brahaj, Jaho (2007). Flamuri i Kombit Shqiptar: origjina, lashtësia. Enti Botues "Gjergj Fishta". ISBN 9789994338849.
- Elsie, Robert (2010). Historical dictionary of Albania. Lanham: Scarecrow Press. ISBN 978-0-8108-7380-3. OCLC 454375231.
- Ermenji, Abas (1968), Vendi që zë Skënderbeu në historinë e Shqiperisë, Paris: Komiteti Kombëtar Demokrat 'Shqipnija ë Lirë', OCLC 504152562
- Schmidt-Neke, Michael (1987), Enstehung und Ausbau der Königsdiktatur in Albanien, 1912-1939, Oldenbourg Wissenschaftsverlag, ISBN 978-3-486-54321-6
- Jelavich, Barbara (1999) [1983], History of the Balkans: Twentieth century, vol. 2, Cambridge, United Kingdom: The Press Syndicate of University of Cambridge, ISBN 978-0-521-27459-3
- Vickers, Miranda (1999), The Albanians: a modern history, I.B.Tauris, ISBN 978-1-86064-541-9
- Nosi, Lef (2007), Dokumenta historike për t'i shërbye historiës tone kombëtare., Tirana: Instituti i Historisë, ISBN 978-99956-10-04-3, OCLC 230208965, archived from the original on 2011-05-07
- Giaro, Tomasz (2007), "The Albanian legal and constitutional system between the World Wars", Modernisierung durch Transfer zwischen den Weltkriegen, Frankfurt am Main, Germany: Vittorio Klosterman GmbH, ISBN 978-3-465-04017-0
