= Dervish Hima =

Albanian politician

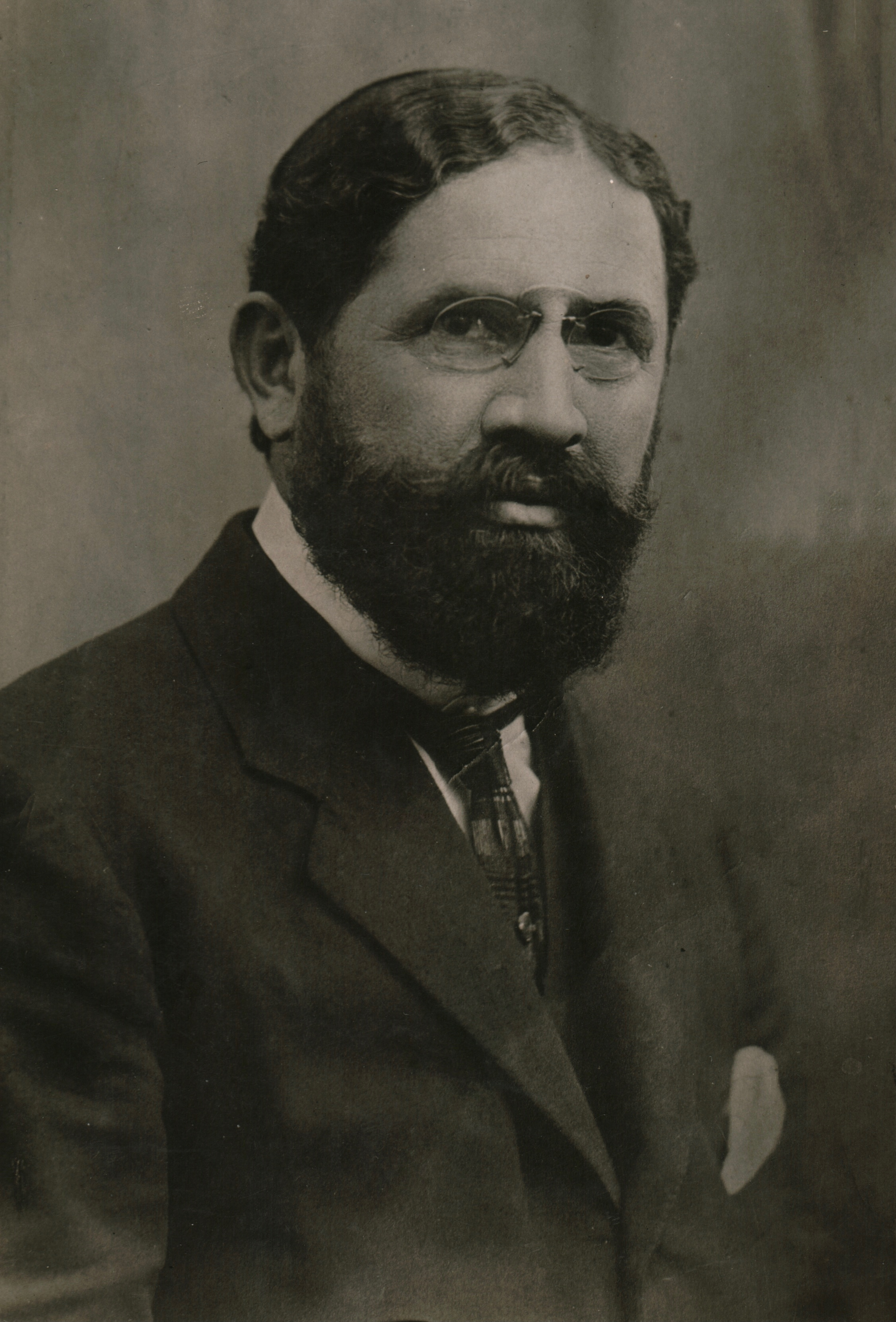

Personal details
- Born: 1872 Struga, Ottoman Albania (present-day North Macedonia)
- Died: 13 April 1928 (aged 56) Albania
- Occupation: Publisher, politician

Dervish Hima (1872–1928), born Ibrahim Mehmet Naxhi, was a 19th-century Albanian politician and one of the delegates who participated at the Albanian Declaration of Independence.

== Biography ==
=== Early life ===
Dervish Hima was born in Struga to an Albanian landowning family, which spoke the Albanian language in the Tosk dialect. In August 1908 Hima left his studies unfinished and devoted himself to the Albanian national movement.

=== Late Ottoman period and Albanian independence ===
Hima also gave speeches to enthusiastic audiences against pan-Islamic influences coming from the Young Turks and called for Albanian national unity, which resulted in an attempted assassination in Korçë by the Ottoman government.

During June 1900 an Albanian newspaper was published in Turkish and Romanian at Bucharest with no connections to any Albanian societies. At the time Hima and Jashar Erebara, both students from Istanbul University were its editors and the paper advocated for an independent Albania ruled by a foreign prince and protected by the Great Powers. The newspaper later ceased publication due to a lack of money and complaints from the Ottoman embassy in Romania. Hima writing in the fortnightly called for the unification of the Albanian vilayets and autonomy for Albania within the Ottoman Empire. The Italians shut down his journal Albania-Arnavudluk which promoted Albanian nationalism and Hima planned to restart publishing activities at Geneva. For Ottoman authorities Hima's journal was seen as being only a revolutionary appeal.

In Paris, Hima was a delegate at the Congress of Ottoman Opposition (1902) organised by Prince Sabahaddin. A committee was founded in Paris by Hima and Dimitri Papazoglou, an Aromanian captain that sought to make Albert Ghica the prince of Albania. Hima's committee was active in Romania and symbolised a Romanian-Albanian rapprochement while the group held anti-Slav and anti-Greek positions. The Ottoman authorities viewed Hima as a pawn of Damad Mahmud Pasha and Ismail Qemali. Hima and Jashar Erebara, another delegate of the 1902 Congress both published a Turkish-Albanian journal for Shpresa, an Albanian nationalist society.

In Geneva the remaining members of the old CUP organisation faced a diplomatic assault by Ottoman authorities. In a final act CUP members of Albanian descent Hima, Ahmed Rifat and Halil Muvaffak founded a bilingual journal İttihad-ı-Osmanî-La Federation Ottomane. To give the appearance that the periodical was established by Ottoman citizens of other ethnicities, an editorial board was created composed of figureheads selected from expatriates of various Ottoman ethnic communities. Information was gathered on the periodical by the Swiss political police. Under the editorship of Hima, the inaugural issue of İttihad appeared on 23 February 1903 with the first article recommending an Ottoman federal system of government with stress placed on Albania as being most suitable for that type of administration. Additional articles discussed reforms of the state, linguistic self determination within the empire and Ottoman unity. The periodical was initiated as a Young Turk publication and in short time became an organ of the Albanian national movement and was written in prose style to attract Albanians. İttihad was unable to last as Swiss authorities of the time undertook strict measures against Albanian opponents of the Ottoman sultan. Hima was a follower of Ibrahim Temo and was instructed by him to write in Young Turk journals with the aim of achieving reconciliation between the Young Turks and Albanian opponents of the sultan.

The restoration in 1908 of the Ottoman constitution allowed for political exiles like Hima to return home. In his newspaper Hima stressed the importance of Albanian identity and language by viewing them as being two sides of the same coin. He outlined that the publication was aimed at enlightening Albanians, raising their levels of intellect and culture along with encouraging cooperation and an understanding of Ottomanism, the Ottoman system, empire and its peoples in relation to them toward improving their situation. Arnavud was used by Hima to address the Ottoman government and keep Albanian issues within the public sphere while his newspaper printed petitions and letters by Albanians and Albanian deputies of the Ottoman parliament on matters such as the Albanian alphabet question. Hima also highlighted Albanian sacrifices and contributions to the empire, claimed that Albania was "the cradle of freedom" and defended use of the tribal law of Dukagjin among Albanian highlanders. He advocated for a unitary province of Albania, Albanian-Turkish language schools, and locals undertaking military service within five provinces in the Ottoman Balkans. On 13 December 1910 Hima raised concerns in Arnavud about Ottoman "militarization" of placing army officers into civil administration positions in Albania instead of qualified bureaucrats and protesting the use of force to resolve local problems. The newspaper was shut down at the end of 1910, part of the wider campaign by the Ottoman government against the Albanian Latin character alphabet and schools. Hima stated at the time that he received assistance for his publishing activities from Albanians within the empire.

In 1911 he published a book Musaver Arnavud (The Illustrated Albanian) in Ottoman Turkish and it was an edited work containing chapters by Hima and other Albanians on history and other topics like the geopolitical situation of Albanians. Hima's book highlighted the narrative of Albanian loyalty and sacrifice to the empire and he stressed the development of an "Albanian national literature" as important for Albanians. During the Albanian revolt of 1912, the vali of Yanina, Mehmed Ali singled him out as being a bad influence on people in the region and Hima wired the Porte with complaints about the behavior of the governor. In the late Ottoman period, Hima supported Austro-Hungarian assistance toward Albanian geopolitical interests in the Balkans. Hima was one of the signatories of the Albanian Declaration of Independence.

=== Later life ===
Hima died in 1928.

== Literature ==
- "Борбата и нуждите на Албания", публикувано във в. "Вести", брой 106, Цариград, 1910 година - A Dervish Hima interview for the Bulgarian Exarchist newspaper "Вести", published in 1910 in Istanbul.
