= Mirash Ivanaj =

Albanian politician (1891-1953)

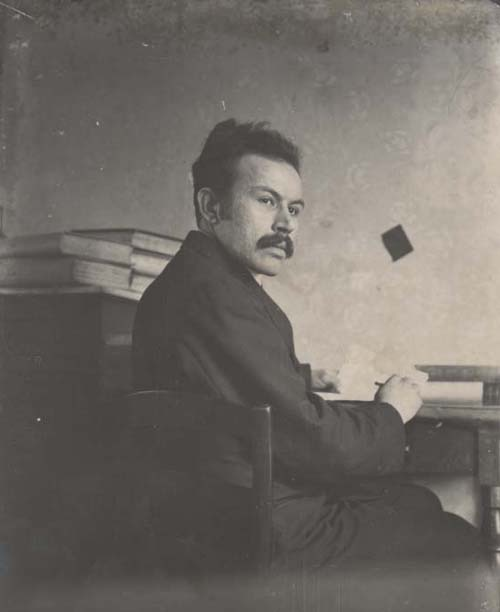

Minister of Education
- In office 11 January 1933 – 16 August 1935
- Monarch: Zog I
- Preceded by: Hil Mosi
- Succeeded by: Nush Bushati

Personal details
- Born: 12 March 1891 Podgorica, Montenegro
- Died: 22 September 1953 (aged 62) Tirana, Albania
- Known for: Ivanaj Reform
- Cabinet: Evangjeli IV Government
- Awards: Honor of the Nation

Mirash Ivanaj (12 March 1891 – 22 September 1953) was an Albanian politician, minister and school director, famous for his role in reforming education system in Albania.

== Life ==
Mirash Ivanaj was born on 12 March 1891, in Podgorica, Principality of Montenegro, in an Albanian family which had migrated there from Begaj-Triesh region. Ivanaj finished high school in Belgrade in 1910 and later went to Italy where he studied in the University of Rome where he laureated in two branches, in Philosophy-Literature and Law. In 1923 he came back to Albania where together with his cousin Nikollë Ivanaj, published the newspaper "Bashkimi". When the June Revolution of 1924 led by Fan Noli gave the power to the opposition forces in Albanian Parliament, Ivanaj left the country. He came back in the end of 1924 when Ahmet Zog returned to power. He was appointed director of Shkodër High School and due to his growing reputation he became Minister of Education in 1933. At that period the education system was rather chaotic. Ivanaj tried to homogenize it. He began nationalizing foreign schools and Albanian government was put under pressure for his policy, especially from Italian fascist government. In September 1934 he introduced the new law on Education making elementary education as obligatory for five years. He created also various secondary education Institutes. The "Education Law", nicknamed "Ivanaj's Law" was the most important and complete law of Albania in that period. Its purpose was to create an integrated national educational system in Albania. In summer 1935 he resigned from his post when he realized that he could not achieve what he wanted with limitation of the budget for the education. He was appointed head of Council of State, a post he kept until the occupation of Albania from Italy in April 1939. Together with his friends Safet Butka and Qemal Butka he mobilized the Albanian students in protests prior to Italian invasion. When the country was occupied, together with Qemal Butka and his brother Martin Ivanaj, he left for Turkey. During his migration in various countries he lost his brother. In October 1945 he returned to Albania. At first he was welcomed by Enver Hoxha and he was appointed teacher at Tirana High School, an institute created by Ivanaj itself when he was a Minister. In May 1947 he was arrested and was sentenced to seven years in prison on accusations of being an "Imperialist agent". He died on 22 September 1953 in Tirana Hospital during a simple operation, a few days from his release date.

In 1995 a foundation named after him and his brother, the "Martin and Mirash Ivanaj Foundation", was created with the intention to promote education among Albanian youth.
