= Albert Ghica =

Romanian aristocrat

- Albert Gjika
- Born: 1868
- Died: 1928 (aged 59–60)
- Citizenship: Romanian
- Occupation: Writer
- Relatives: Ghica family
- Writing career
- Language: French, Romanian
- Notable work: L'Albanie et la question d'Orient

Albert Ghica (1868-1928) was a Romanian writer and socialite. He was a member of the Ghica noble family. Later in life he changed his name to the Albanian form Gjika, for more credentials in his quest for the Albanian throne.

He was a pretender to the Albanian throne. A committee was founded in Paris by Dervish Hima and Dimitri Papazoglou, an Aromanian captain that sought to make Ghica the prince of Albania. Good relations were maintained between Ghica and Ismail Qemali, an Albanian leader involved in the Albanian national movement. Writing on the Albanian struggle against the Ottomans at the beginning of the 20th century, British journalist and foreign correspondent for the Manchester Guardian in the Balkans H. N. Brailsford spoke the following in his book Macedonia; Its Races and Their Future (1906): "The second claimant (for a possible future Albanian State) is a certain Prince Albert Ghica, who comes of a family of Albanian origin, long resident in Roumania. It has given Hospodars (Governors) to the old Wallachian provinces and diplomats to the modern kingdom, and enjoys princely rank in the Austrian Empire. Prince Albert is a comparatively young man with plausible manners and a dubious past, who speaks fluent French, and knows neither one word of the Albanian language nor the elements of Albanian geography. He has been chosen honorary president by one of the numerous clubs of Albanian immigrants in Bucharest, and on the strength of this social honour he poses in European hotels as the chief-elect of the Albanian people. He talks of venturing in person into Albania and raising the flag of revolt. We shall see."

He married Margaret Dowling in London in April 1905. He later seemed to have abandoned his bid for throne, as the personal letters Austrian Baron Franz Nopcsa von Felső-Szilvás, himself a pretender to the Albanian throne, suggest. They state the following: "Albert Ghica, who had been a pretender to the Albanian throne himself, had managed to interest the Duke of Montpensier in the Albanian throne. He ceded his 'rights,' which were recognized by no one as a matter of fact, to the duke and began to campaign on his behalf in exchange for an appropriate remuneration."

Under his presidency, a Pan-Albanian Congress was organized in Bucharest in 1905 where Ismail Qemali, the future founder of the modern Albanian state and its first head of state and government, deliberated with Bucharest's Albanian community. Albert Ghica also wrote on the topic of the Albanian issue, publishing the book L'Albanie et la question d'Orient: (Solution de la question d'Orient).

== See also ==
- Ghica family
- Albanian Congress of Trieste
