= Ismail Qemali =

Founder and 1st Prime Minister of Albania

Babai Kombit Ismail Qemali
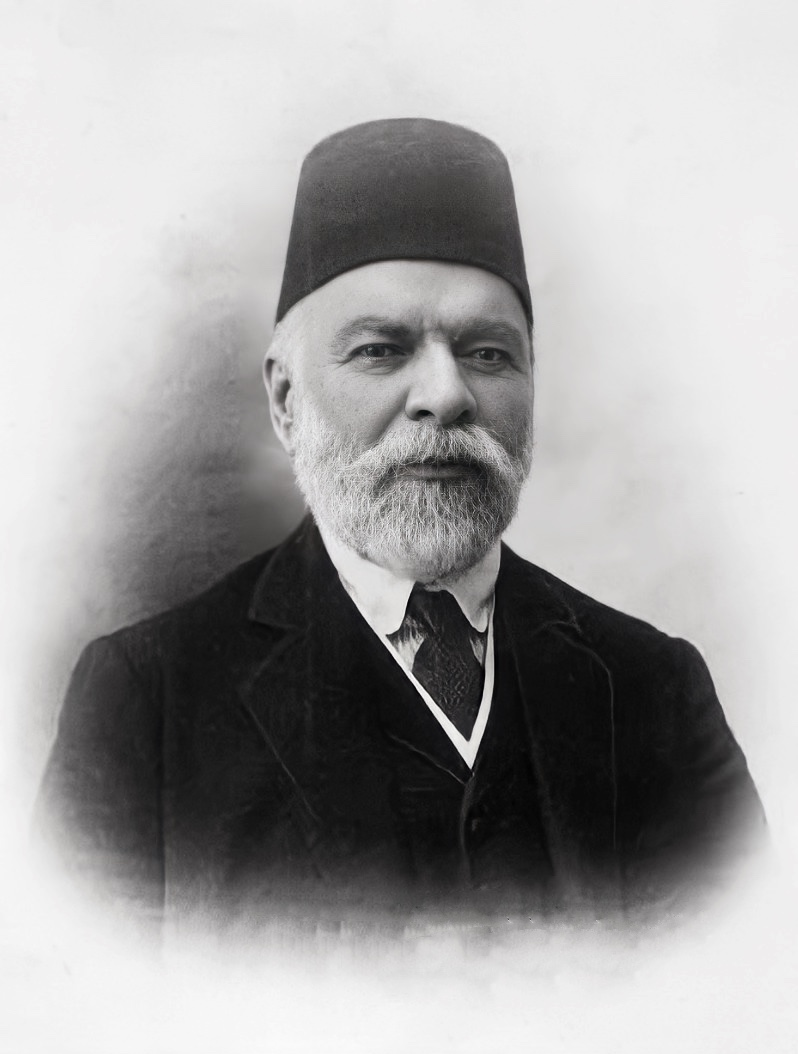
- Official portrait, c. 1917 or earlier

1st Prime Minister of Albania
- In office 4 December 1912 – 22 January 1914
- Preceded by: Office established
- Succeeded by: Turhan Përmeti

1st Foreign Minister of Albania
- In office 4 December 1912 – June 1913
- Prime Minister: Himself
- Preceded by: Office established
- Succeeded by: Mufid Libohova

Member of the Chamber of Deputies
- In office 23 December 1908 – 17 January 1912
- Sultan: Abdulhamid II (r. 1876–1909); Mehmed V (r. 1909–1918)
- Constituency: Sanjak of Avlona

Personal details
- Born: 16 January 1844 Vlorë, Janina vilayet, Ottoman Empire (modern-day Albania)
- Died: 26 January 1919 (aged 75) Perugia, Kingdom of Italy
- Spouse(s): Nasipe Hanami; Kleoniki Sourmeli
- Children: 10 (1 died during birth)
- Parent(s): Mahmud bey Vlora (father); Hedije Libohova (mother)
- Education: Istanbul Law Faculty; Zosimaia School
- Occupation: Politician
- Awards: Hero of the People

Ismail Qemali, or Ismail Kemal Bey Vlora (Albanian: [ismail cɛmali]; 16 January 1844 – 26 January 1919), was an Albanian politician and statesman who is regarded as the founder of modern Albania. He served as the first prime minister of Albania from December 1912 until his resignation in January 1914.

Born in Vlorë to an Albanian noble family, Qemali developed an early interest in languages and later studied law in Istanbul. He travelled across Europe and returned to Albania after the Young Turk Revolution. He took part in the Congress of Ottoman Opposition and played a major role in the Albanian revolt of 1912.

The principal author of the Declaration of Independence, Qemali was elected leader of the Provisional Government of Albania by the All-Albanian Congress in November 1912. He became prime minister and foreign minister of Albania. He died in exile in Italy in 1919.

== Early life ==
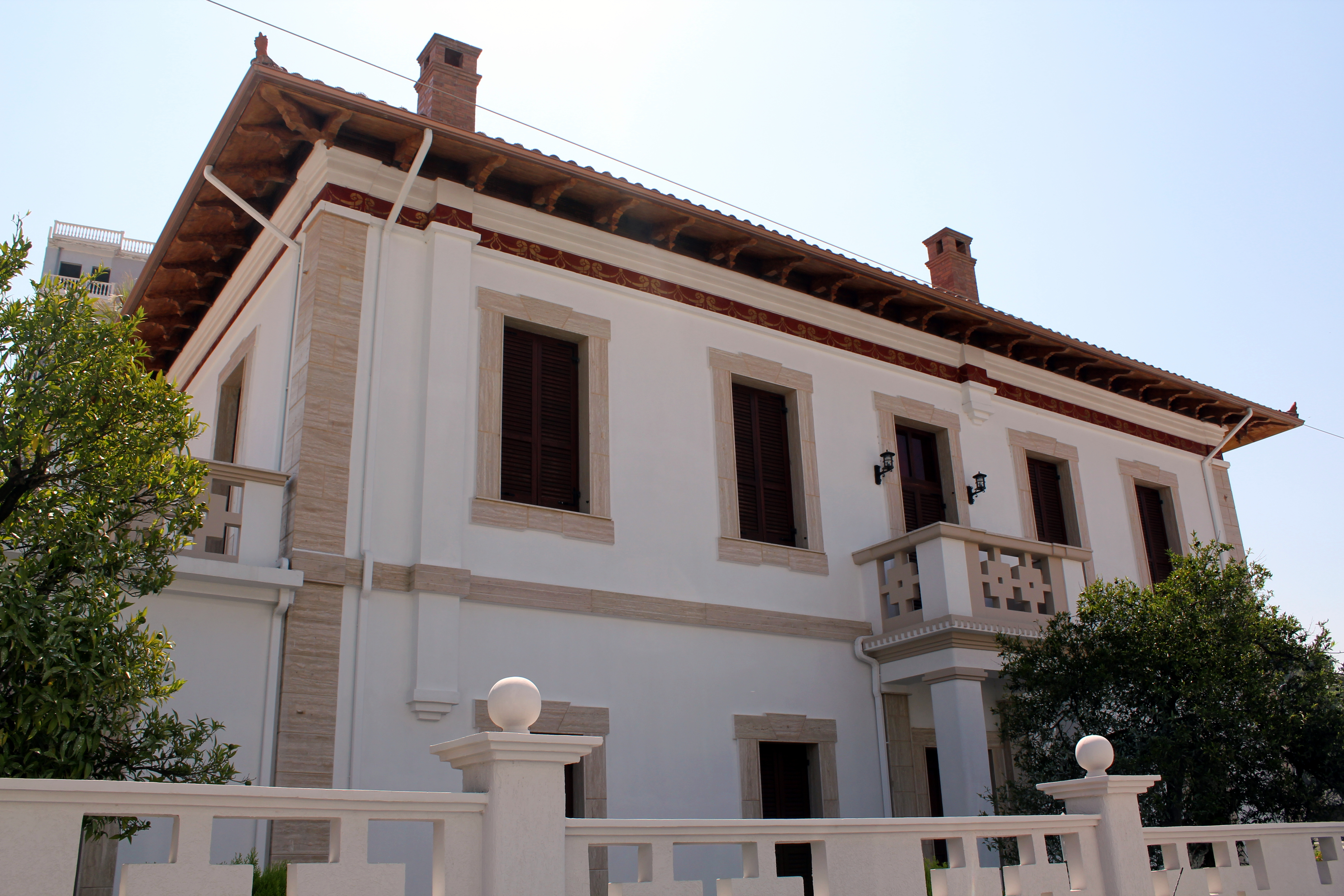
The Qemali House, Vlora

Ismail Qemali was born to an Albanian Muslim family on 16 January 1844 in the city of Vlorë, then part of the Ottoman Empire. He completed his primary education in his hometown. Later he attended the Zosimaia School in Ioannina and graduated from Ottoman law school in Istanbul. Qemali married a Greek woman Kleoniki Sourmeli and sent his children to receive an education in Greece.

== Political career ==
Qemali embarked on a career as an Ottoman civil servant reaching high government positions in European and Asian parts of the empire after he moved to Istanbul in May 1860. He identified with the reform wing of Midhat Pasha, the author of the Constitution of the Ottoman Empire with whom Qemali was a close collaborator, and he became governor of several towns in the Balkans. During these years he took part in efforts for the standardization of the Albanian alphabet supporting the use of Latin characters for writing Albanian and the establishment of an Albanian cultural association.

By 1877, Qemali seemed to be on the brink of important functions in the Ottoman administration, but when Ottoman sultan Abdulhamid II (r. 1876–1909) dismissed Midhat as prime minister, Ismail Qemali was sent into exile in western Anatolia, though the Sultan later recalled him and made him governor of Beirut. Qemali in 1892 presented the Sultan with a plan for a Balkan Confederation. It involved an entente between Balkan states and the empire eventually bound by mutual defense and economic development of resources agreements within a unified Great Eastern state with the Ottoman Empire as its centre and return of old borders. In this framework, Albania like North Macedonia was not treated as a separate state but as part of the Ottoman state. In time his liberal policy recommendations caused him to fall out of favour with the Sultan again. Qemali was aware that the empire came close to intervention from the Great Powers due to the Armenian crisis of 1895. Abdulhamid II awarded Qemali the position of governor (wali) of Tripoli, however he viewed the high post as exile.

=== Exile ===
In May 1900 Ismail Qemali boarded the British ambassador's yacht, claimed asylum and was conveyed out of the empire where for the next eight years he lived in exile. Qemali left for Athens and issued proclamations explaining his abandonment of service to the empire while Ottoman authorities were upset with his flight. His interest toward the Albanian question was limited until these events and Qemali's participation in the Albanian national movement was seen as an asset among Albanian circles who would bring prestige and influence Albanians Muslims to support the cause. He also worked to promote constitutional rule in the Ottoman Empire.

In Paris he met Faik Konica and the two leaders worked together for a short time on Albanian issues through newspaper publications where Qemali called for Albanian unity, economic development, progress and to warn of future dangers of subjugation by Balkan states. The pair fell out as Qemali found Konica difficult to work with while Konica found his focus of being a politician overwhelming and disapproved of his pro-Greek policy. Qemali went on to found the newspaper Selamet (Salvation) published in Ottoman Turkish, Albanian and Greek which called for cooperation between Albanians and Greeks, due to both peoples having the same geopolitical interests. Some Albanian activists involved in the national movement considered those views as suspicious and an instrument of Greek policy causing his popularity to wane among Albanians.

At first Qemali made overtures to Austria-Hungary as the great power to assist Albanians in developing a more unified national opinion about their future, founding of more laic Albanian schools and cultivating their language and attaining autonomy. Later, he became close with Italo-Albanians, shifted his leanings toward Italy and supported Italian policy for Albania to counter Austro-Hungarian territorial ambitions in the Balkans. The Ottoman government initiated a crackdown of members and sympathisers of the Young Turk movement (CUP) with Qemali's son Mahmud, a Council of State official being dismissed.

Qemali in Paris participated in the Congress of Ottoman Opposition (1902) organised by Prince Mehmed Sabahaddin and backed his faction calling for reforms, minority rights, revolution and European intervention in the empire. The 1902 Congress resulted in no organisations being established in the Balkans and an unknown individual impersonating Qemali travelled to various cities in Bulgaria and succeeded in duping many Muslims. The aftermath of the 1902 Congress did result in the formation of the new central committee with attempts for the creation of a "permanent committee", however Qemali and the Ottoman princes Sabahaddin and Lutfullah failed to get support from the Armenians. Later at a gathering of the permanent members of the new committee at the princes' house Qemali was installed as chairman. Control of the official CUP newspaper Osmanli was given by the old members of the central committee to Prince Sabahaddin and Qemali of the new central committee.

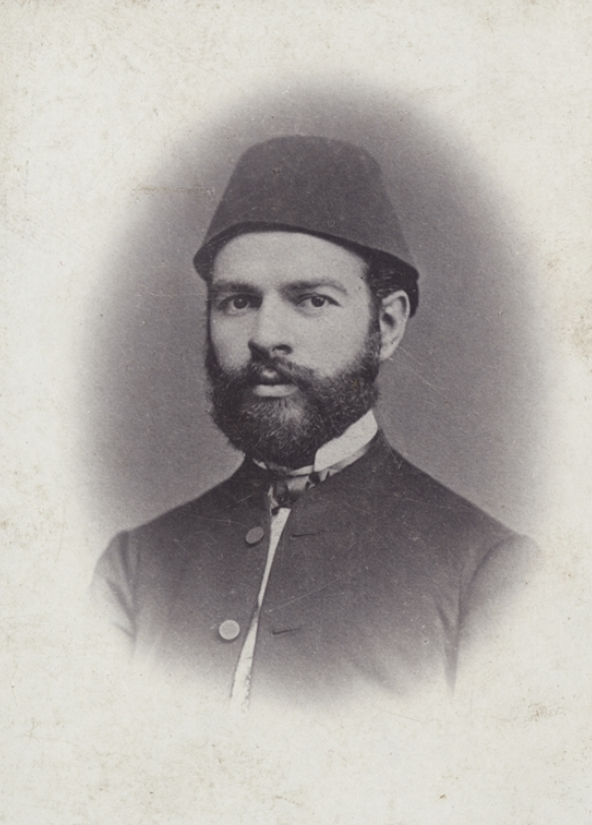
Portrait of a young Ismail Qemali in 1867.

The new committee attempted to get Armenian endorsement through niceties about a lack of ethnic differences while Armenian organisations responded favorably toward figures like Qemali. Due to Qemali's prominent role Albanians were targeted by the new committee through articles published in the newspaper Osmanli warning of partition by Balkan and Western countries of Albanian inhabited lands within the empire. These publications were distributed secretly in Albania through known associates such as Xhemil Vlora (Avlonyalı Cemil) who worked for Qemali. Qemali supported the leadership of the Albanian movement such as preparing appeals for Jup Kastrati or creating in Paris an Albanian Council.

Journals supported by Qemali promoted Albanian autonomy, however the new committee failed to win support among Albanians to their side. Qemali along with the Ottoman princes compared themselves to the statesmen of the Tanzimat reform era. During this time Qemali's positions swung between overthrow of the sultan and increasingly backing the Albanian national movement. He corresponded over Albania's future with the Prince of Albanian origins, Albert Ghica who had designs on becoming an Albanian monarch and with Preng Doçi about the involvement of Qemali in an administrative role within a future autonomous Albania. Good relations were maintained with Ghica, while Dervish Hima an Albanian politically involved with the Romanian prince was viewed by Ottoman authorities as a pawn of Qemali.

=== Plot against the sultan ===
Between 1902 and 1903 a coup d'état plot to overthrow Abdulhamid II was devised by the CUP. Involved were Colonel Shevket Bey and Rexhep Pasha Mati (Recep Pasha) left in charge of organising the military aspects of the plan along with Qemali and Prince Sabaheddin given the task of getting diplomatic and financial support and to buy two ships for the venture. Qemali's task was the most difficult aspect of the plot, he kept a unit in Paris, commenced political activities as a high ranking politician in exile and made many visits to London which annoyed the Ottoman government as they were unable to work out his real aims.

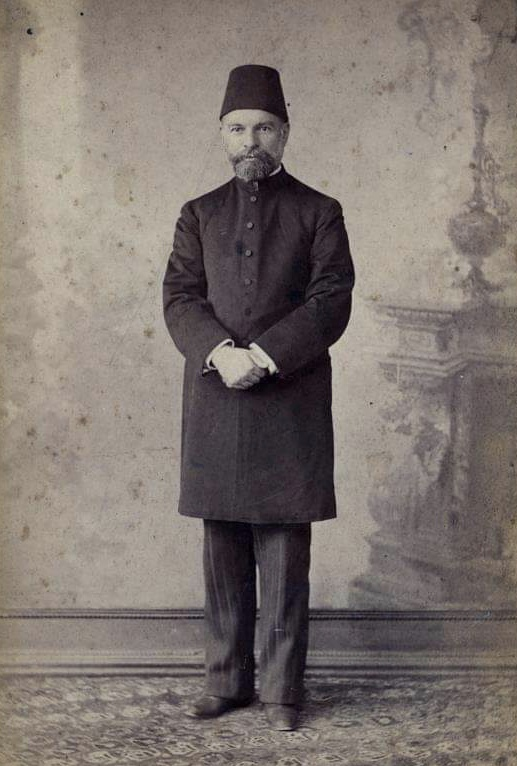
Ismail Qemali in 1890

Ottoman authorities paid close attention and in some cases court martialed people they thought were associated with Qemali in attempts that were unsuccessful to find out his intentions. In Paris Qemali established close contacts and good relations with journalists such as Stéphane Lauzanne and William Morton Fullerton. During July 1902, Qemali went to London to get British support for the plot and corresponded with and visited people in the British government such as Edmund Monson and Thomas Sanderson. He received responses from the Foreign Office, however Qemali exaggerated the level of British support, being only moral support and ambiguous for the venture. Qemali interactions with the British had managed to raise his profile and notability while he also discussed with them the Ottoman exile of his son to Bitlis. The British were aware of the activities of Qemali and his associates.

Qemali also corresponded with London-based Ottoman diplomats on the plan like Reşid Sadi who secretly worked for the Young Turks. Attempts by Qemali were made to convince Lord Cromer that the "Turkish question" was a pressing matter and he agreed with those sentiments and promised to reply to the Foreign office. He also secretly met Abbas II of Egypt (r. 1892–1914) in an attempt to secure funds and the khedive placed £4000 in an English bank for the plot, yet later misgivings about Qemali made the Egyptian leader halt funds and fearing scandal he relented.

An Albanian confidant Xhafer Berxhani from Greece was sent by Qemali to see Rexhep Pasha in Tripoli, Ottoman Libya. Eqrem Vlora, a member of the Vlora family stated that during this time Rexhep Pasha sent £1000 in gold to Qemali and assisted his son Tahir Pasha in exile at Tripoli to escape to Europe. At the end of January 1903, Qemali came back to Paris and found the princes grieving the death of their father Damad Mahmud Pasha, yet they all proceeded to London to make financial arrangements for the plot. Later Qemali and the princes worked to finalise details of their plan. Qemali having the details of tonnage and dimensions left for Athens with £4000 to buy two ships.

While there Qemali was disappointed with the procurement process for the ships and the delay made the central committee members go to Athens. Reşid Sadi arrived and found there was no large ships and that Qemali was residing at the house of an aide-de-camp to the Greek monarch. Qemali informed Reşid Sadi that he was duped and that in Greece it was difficult to find suitable ships. Later Sabaheddin traveled to see the khedive and failed to procure funds and ships where later he returned to Athens and for the last time met with Qemali, Reşid Sadi and Vasileos Musurus Ghikis. Qemali wanted to travel to Naples and get ships from there, however the others decided to abandon the plot.

The failure of the plan was put down to different reasons with Qemali blaming prolonged negotiations about obtaining ships, while Rexhep Pasha viewed Qemali's lukewarm attitude for the venture as reason to change his mind. From within Sabaheddin's inner circle the view was that Qemali took the money to profit for his own purposes. Those sentiments were shared by people such as Haydar Midhat who quit the new central committee after he learned that Qemali worked for Greek interests in Albania and was on their payroll. After the 1908 Young Turk revolution some people who opposed the CUP made allegations against Qemali of being uninterested in the plot, worked for his interests and a "crook" that took money from the prince. Qemali broke ties with the Young Turks and on 16 August 1903 he gave an interview to an Italian newspaper in his role as an "Albanian patriot" and pursued his new preoccupation with Albania's future.

=== Albanian cause ===
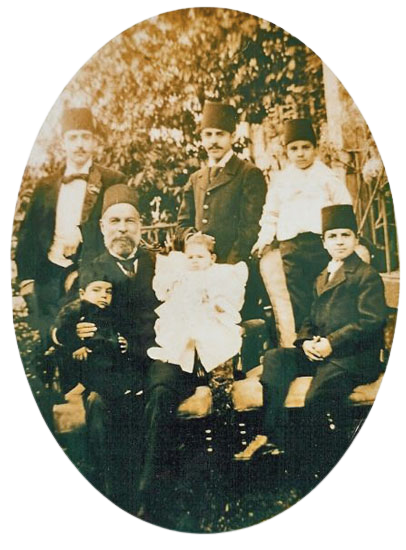
Ismail Qemali with his family (1896)

In January 1907 a secret agreement was signed between Qemali and the Greek government which concerned the possibility of an alliance against the Ottoman Empire. There is not much information about the meeting but some sources state that the two sides agreed that the future Greek-Albanian boundary should be located on the Ceraunian Mountains with no Albanian armed activity in the area in exchange for Greek backing of Albanian independence. This was not widely accepted by Albanian nationalists and patriots. The CUP severely criticised Qemali for the agreement with the Greeks.

In Rome July 1907, Qemali gave a lengthy interview to Italian media where he called for cooperation between Balkan peoples, a "Greco-Albanian entente" and affirmed Albania as having its own language, literature, history and traditions and a right to liberty and independence. He was also against Albanian cooperation with Bulgarian Macedonians and viewed their support of Albanian insurrectionists as self-serving and strengthening their movement due to depletion of Albanian forces. Qemali's reasons for closer ties with Greeks during this time was to gain support for Albanian independence and thwart Bulgarian ambitions in the wider Balkans region as he viewed them as a threat to Greece and northern Albania in Macedonia along with Austro-Hungarian territorial ambitions.

Throughout this time Qemali living abroad was not the leader of the Albanian national movement, due to his strong pro-British and pro-Greek position. As an Albanian leader the CUP was hostile toward Qemali and the organisation shunned him due to his secret understanding with the Greeks to partition the western regions of the Balkan provinces of the empire. During his lifetime Qemali looked upon Greek culture with favour and respect, maintained friendly relations with Greeks and promoted cooperation between them and Albanians. He promoted a diplomatic solution for creating an independent Albania, an approach rejected by some Albanian groups of the era that instead favoured guerilla warfare against the empire. Qemali may have favoured intervention by the Great Powers into Albanian affairs and those were accusations made against him by a minority of opponents. Over time however he became an Albanian nationalist and by 1912 would declare the independence of Albania.

=== Young Turk Revolution and countercoup ===
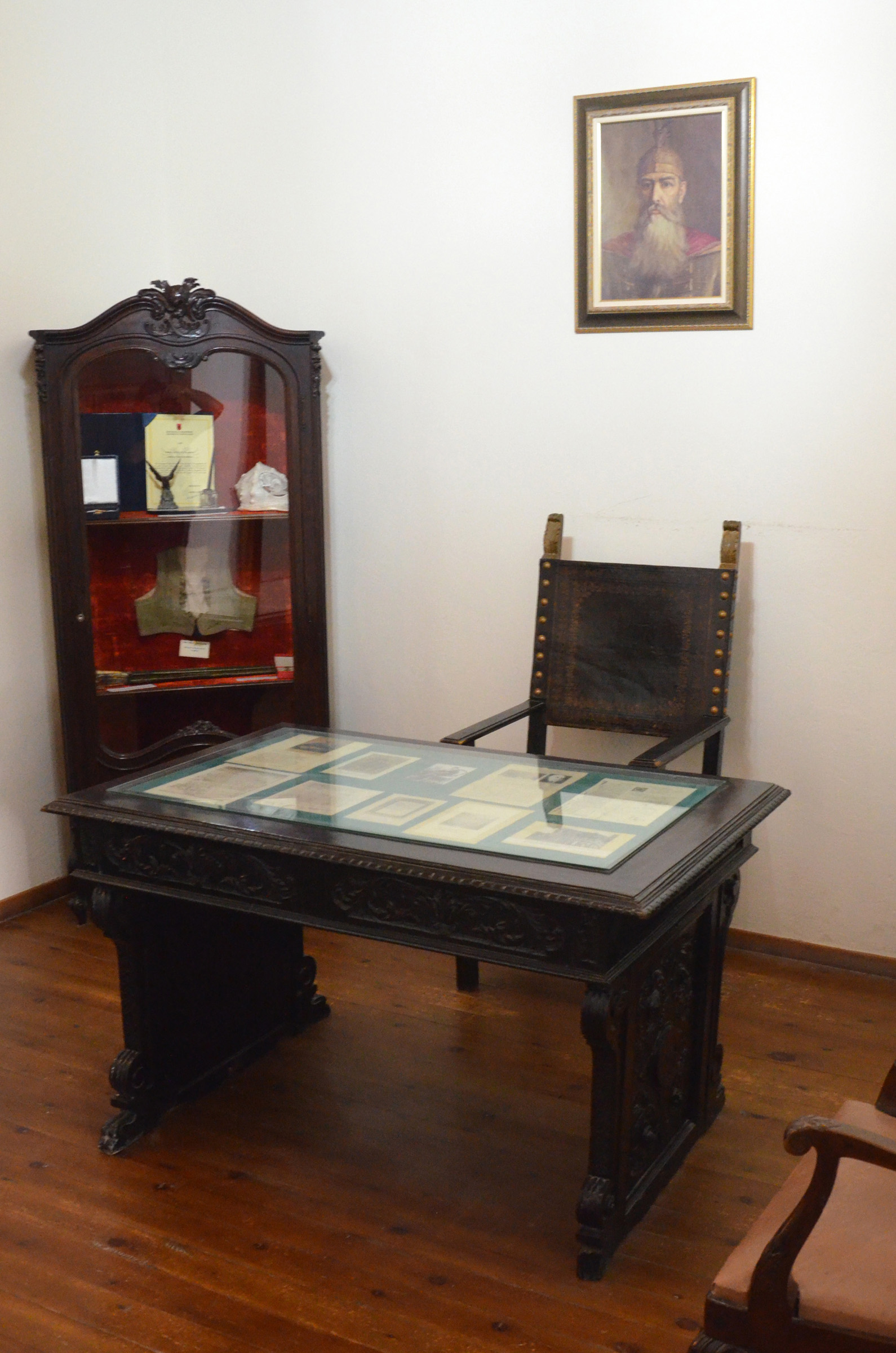
Desk and glass cabinet of Ismail Qemali, Vlorë Museum

During the events of the Young Turk Revolution (1908), rumors of the time had it that Abdulhamid II as a last resort asked Qemali for assistance and his response was that only the restoration of the Ottoman constitution would pacify the Albanians. After the 1908 revolution and constitutional restoration Qemali returned from exile and became a deputy representing Berat in the restored Ottoman Parliament, working with liberal politicians and the British. He contributed to the Young Turk (CUP) newspaper Tanin where Qemali called for government reforms. Qemali became leader of the Albanian deputies in the Ottoman parliament and did not oppose Austro-Hungarian annexation of Bosnia adding that recognition of the move should entail security guarantees for the empire in case of war with Balkan states over territory.

During the 31 March incident, the leadership of the Liberty Party (Ahrar) attempted unsuccessfully to get control over events and stop the rebellion from turning toward a reactionary pro-sultan and anti-constitutional course. Qemali, an Ahrar deputy managed to get some parliamentarians to attend parliament, they accepted the requests of the mutineering troops and made an official announcement that the constitution and sharia would be kept. Uninvolved in the events of the initial countercoup Qemali was briefly made President of the Ottoman National Assembly and led it to recognise a new government by Abdulhamid II. Qemali wired his constituency in Vlorë telling them to acknowledge the new government and Albanians from his hometown backed him with some raiding the arms depot to support the sultan with weapons if the situation called for it. Qemali left the city prior to the CUP Action Army arriving at Istanbul to suppress the rebellion and he fled to Greece. A government investigation later cleared Qemali of any wrongdoing.

=== Nationalism ===
His political career thereafter concentrated solely on Albanian nationalism. Increasing guerilla activity in Southern Albania led to Qemali coming under suspicion from the Ottoman government during the summer months of 1909. The Athens embassy of the Ottoman Empire reported that Qemali negotiated with organization financed by wealthy Albanian Tosks and Greece about forging a union. Qemali returned from Athens to Istanbul after the parliament cleared him from involvement in the counter-revolutionary movement and he became leader of a group of "modern liberals" who were former members of the Ahrar party. In 1910 Qemali in statements to the Austro-Hungarian ambassador criticized the Young Turk government for promoting Turks above other nationalities in the empire and their divide and rule policies regarding Albanians.

During the Albanian revolt of 1911 he traveled with Xhemal Bey of Tirana and joined leaders of the revolt at a meeting in Gerče, a village in Montenegro on 23 June. Together they drew up the "Greçë Memorandum" that called for Albanian autonomy, schooling and language rights, recognition of Albanians, electoral freedoms and liberty, military service in Albania and other measures which addressed their requests both to Ottoman Empire and Europe (in particular to the Great Britain). In December 1911, Qemali and Hasan Prishtina convened secret meetings of Albanian political notables in Istanbul that decided to organise a future Albanian uprising.

Qemali was given the task of going to Europe to obtain support from sympathetic governments for the Albanian movement in addition to financial support and funds for buying 15,000 guns. He met with Austro-Hungarian officials in Paris and expressed that his previous misgivings regarding them had shifted, viewed Austria-Hungary as the only defender of Albania and could rely on Albanian support if they backed Albanian geopolitical interests within a strong Ottoman state. With Prishtina he took the initiative to organize the Taksim meeting for the organization of the Albanian revolt of 1912. During the debates which involved the revolt, Qemali was part of the leadership faction that backed and advocated for Albanian autonomy within the empire during negotiations with the Ottomans.

=== Independence of Albania ===
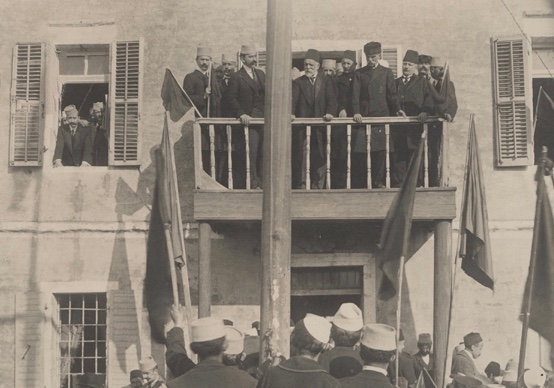
Ismail Qemali at the first anniversary of the Assembly of Vlorë which proclaimed the independence of Albania (28 November 1913)

The Balkan Wars marked the end of Ottoman rule in the region. In September 1912, Qemali along with Luigj Gurakuqi traveled to Bucharest to consult with the Albanian community in Romania. Later he departed for Vienna and kept in touch through telegram with Austro-Hungarian officials and supported as a solution their intervention in Albania. On 12 November Qemali met with officials from the Austro-Hungarian foreign ministry and they told him of their sympathies for the Albanians and their situation but could not do much due to the continuing war. Foreign Minister Leopold Berchtold supported Qemali's views on the Albanian question and placed a boat at his disposal. From Trieste, Qemali sailed to Durrës by mid November, however his stay was short due to Ottoman authorities objecting to his presence with Serb forces approaching the city and he left for Vlorë arriving there on 26 November. Meanwhile, his son Ethem had summoned Albanian representatives to Vlorë from all over Albania.

Qemali was the principal figure in the secession of Albania from the Ottoman Empire, in the Albanian Declaration of Independence and the formation of the independent Albania on 28 November 1912. This signaled the end of more than 400 years of Ottoman rule in Albania. Together with Gurakuqi, he raised the Albanian flag on the balcony of the two-story building in Vlorë where the Declaration of Independence had just been signed.

== Prime minister ==
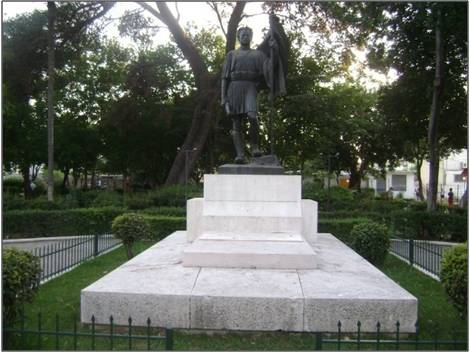
Ismail Qemali's mausoleum in Vlora

The establishment of the government was postponed for the fourth session of the Assembly of Vlorë, held on 4 December 1912, until representatives of all regions of Albania arrived to Vlorë. The Ottoman Council of Ministers opposed his actions preferring Albanian autonomy and requested that Qemali give military assistance to the Ottoman Third Army trapped in southern Albania. Aware of the collapse of the Ottoman Empire in the Balkans, Qemali asked the Great Powers to recognise and support an independent Albania.

The Ottoman CUP government sought to restore its control over Albania and sent lieutenant colonel Bekir Fikri in 1913 to raise Albanian support for Ahmed Izzet Pasha, an Albanian Ottoman officer and CUP member as the candidate for the Albanian throne. Fikri acting as Izzet Pasha's emissary contacted Qemali and presented him with a plan that envisaged joint Ottoman, Albanian and Bulgarian military action against Greece and Serbia. Albania's reward in the military venture would have been the allocation of Kosovo and Chameria, areas given to Serbia and Greece by the Conference of Ambassadors.

Qemali assured Fikri of his loyalty to Izzet as monarch of Albania and supported a plan from the CUP government in Istanbul to secretly infiltrate troops and weapons into the country to conduct a guerilla war against Serbian and Greek forces. After these negotiations Fikri sent telegrams to Istanbul, and asked the government to send ammunition, weapons and soldiers. The Serbs uncovered the plot and reported the operation to the International Control Commission (ICC). The ICC, an organisation temporarily administering Albania on behalf of the Great Powers allowed their Dutch officers serving as the Albanian Gendarmerie to declare a state of emergency and stop the plot. They raided Vlorë on 7–8 January 1914, discovering more than 200 Ottoman troops and arrested Fikri. During Fikri's trial the plot emerged and an ICC military court under Colonel Willem de Veer condemned him to death and later commuted to life imprisonment, while Qemali and his cabinet resigned. After Qemali left the country, turmoil ensued throughout Albania.

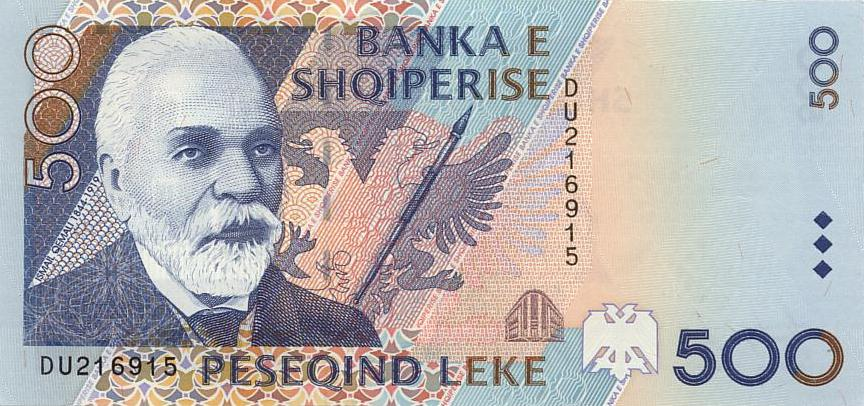
Qemali on Albanian 500 lekë banknote

== Exile and death ==
During the First World War (1914–1918), Qemali lived in exile in Paris, where, though short of funds, he maintained a wide range of contacts and collaborated with the correspondent of the continental edition of the British newspaper Daily Mail, Somerville Story, to write his memoirs. His autobiography, published after his death, is the only memoir of a late Ottoman statesman to be written in English and is a unique record of a liberal, multicultural approach to the problems of the dying empire. In 1918, Qemali travelled to Italy to promote support for his movement in Albania, but was prevented by the Italian government from leaving Italy and remained as its involuntary guest at a hotel in Perugia, much to his irritation. He died of an apparent heart attack on 26 January 1919. After his death, his body was brought to Vlorë and buried in the local tekke of the Bektashi Order.

== Reception and legacy ==
Ismail Qemali is commemorated in Albania as their Babai Kombit ("Father of the Nation"). He is depicted on the obverses of the Albanian 200 lekë banknote of 1992–1996, and of the 500 lekë banknote issued since 1996. On 27 June 2012, Albanian president Bamir Topi decorated Qemali with the Order of the National Flag (post-mortem).

== Sources ==
- David Barchard, The Man Who Made Albania—Ismail Kemal Bey, Cornucopia Magazine No 34, 2004.
- Ismail Kemal Bey and Sommerville Story, ed. The memoirs of Ismail Kemal Bey. London: Constable and company, 1920. (The Internet Archive, full access)
- Hanioğlu, M. Şükrü (2001). Preparation for a Revolution: The Young Turks, 1902-1908. Oxford University Press. ISBN 9780199771110.
- Blumi, Isa (2013). Ottoman Refugees, 1878-1939: Migration in a Post-Imperial World. A&C Black. ISBN 9781472515384.
- Puto, Arben (2012). Pavarësia Shqiptare dhe Diplomacia e Fuqive të Mëdha : 1912-1914 (in Albanian) (Botim i ripunuar ed.). Tiranë: Botimet Toena. ISBN 978-99943-1-826-1.
- Skendi, Stavro (1967). The Albanian National Awakening. Princeton: Princeton University Press. ISBN 9781400847761.
- Winnifrith, Tom (1992). Perspectives on Albania. Springer. ISBN 9781349220502.
- Treadway, John D. (1983), "The Malissori Uprising of 1911", The Falcon and Eagle: Montenegro and Austria-Hungary, 1908–1914, West Lafayette, Ind.: Purdue University Press, p. 78, ISBN 978-0-911198-65-2, OCLC 9299144
- Pitouli-Kitsou, Hristina (1997). Οι Ελληνοαλβανικές Σχέσεις και το βορειοηπειρωτικό ζήτημα κατά περίοδο 1907–1914 (Thesis). National and Kapodistrian University of Athens.
- Brisku, Adrian (2020). "Renegotiating the Empire, Forging the Nation-State: The Albanian Case through the Political Economic Thought of Ismail Qemali, Fan Noli, and Luigj Gurakuqi, c. 1890–1920s". Nationalities Papers. 48 (1): 158–174. doi:10.1017/nps.2018.52. S2CID 211344809.
- Elsie, Robert (2010). Historical Dictionary of Albania. Rowman & Littlefield. ISBN 9780810861886.
- Giaro, Tomasz (2007). "The Albanian legal and constitutional system between the World Wars". Modernisierung durch Transfer zwischen den Weltkriegen. Frankfurt am Main, Germany: Vittorio Klosterman GmbH. p. 185. ISBN 978-3-465-04017-0.
- Tütüncü, Mehmet (2017). "Grebeneli Bekir Fikri Bey Albay Thomson'a Karşi 1914 Avlonya Olayı [Grebeneli Bekir Fikri Bey against Colonel Thomson: The Case of Vlorë 1914]". Düşünce ve Tarih. 3 (31): 43.
- Roszkowski, Wojciech; Kofman, Jan (2016). Biographical Dictionary of Central and Eastern Europe in the Twentieth Century. Routledge. ISBN 9781317475941.
- Kiefer, Dorothea (1979). Entwicklungspolitik in Jugoslawien. Ihre Zielsetzungen, Planungen und Ergebnisse. Oldenbourg Verlag. ISBN 9783486496017.
- Kondis, Basil (1976). Greece and Albania, 1908–1914. Thessaloniki: Institute for Balkan Studies.
- Gawrych, George (2006). The Crescent and the Eagle: Ottoman rule, Islam and the Albanians, 1874–1913. London: IB Tauris. p. 200. ISBN 9781845112875.
- Gostentschnigg, Kurt (2017). Wissenschaft im Spannungsfeld von Politik und Militär: Die österreichisch-ungarische Albanologie 1867-1918. Springer-Verlag. p. 575. ISBN 9783658189112.
- Clayer, Nathalie (2007). Aux origines du nationalisme albanais: La naissance d'une nation majoritairement musulmane en Europe [The origins of Albanian nationalism: The birth of a predominantly Muslim nation in Europe]. Paris: Karthala. p. 705. ISBN 9782845868168.
- Sommerville, A.M. (1927), Twenty years in Paris with a pen, A. Rivers ltd.
- Xoxi, Koli (1983), Ismail Qemali: jeta dhe vepra, Shtëpia Botuese "8 Nentori"
- Zürcher, Erik Jan (2017). "31 Mart: A Fundamentalist Uprising in Istanbul in April 1909?". In Lévy-Aksu, Noémi (ed.). The Young Turk Revolution and the Ottoman Empire: The Aftermath of 1918. I.B.Tauris. pp. 201–202. ISBN 9781786720214.

Political offices
Preceded by Position established	Prime Minister of Albania; 1912–1914	Succeeded by Turhan Përmeti
Preceded by Position established	Foreign Minister of Albania; 1912–1914	Succeeded by Mufid Libohova
