= London Conference of 1912–1913 =

International summit on the First Balkan War

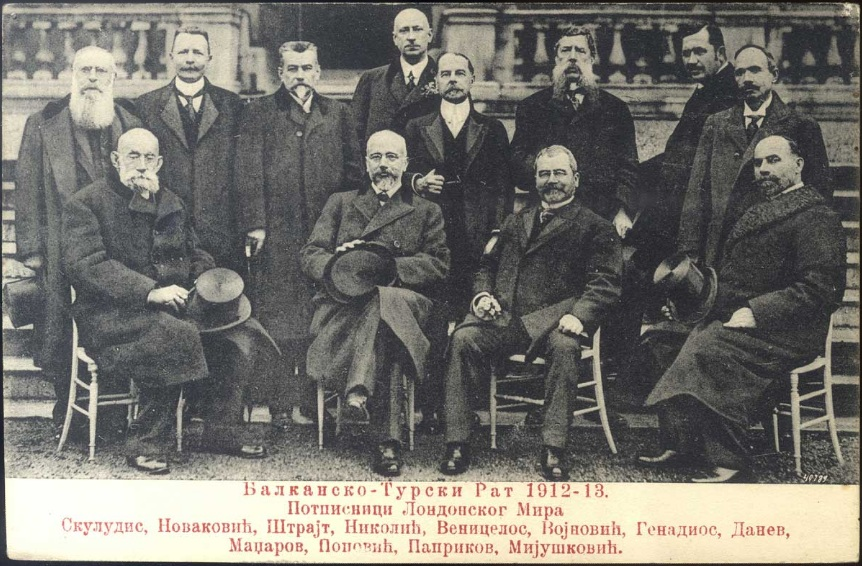
- Representatives of the Balkan states
- Date: September 1912 – August 1913
- Location: London, United Kingdom
- Also known as: London Peace Conference
- Type: Conference
- Motive: To arbitrate between the warring powers as to territorial acquisitions, and also to determine the future of Albania
- Participants: Austria-Hungary; France; Germany; United Kingdom; Italy; Russia
- Outcome: Establishment of the Principality of Albania

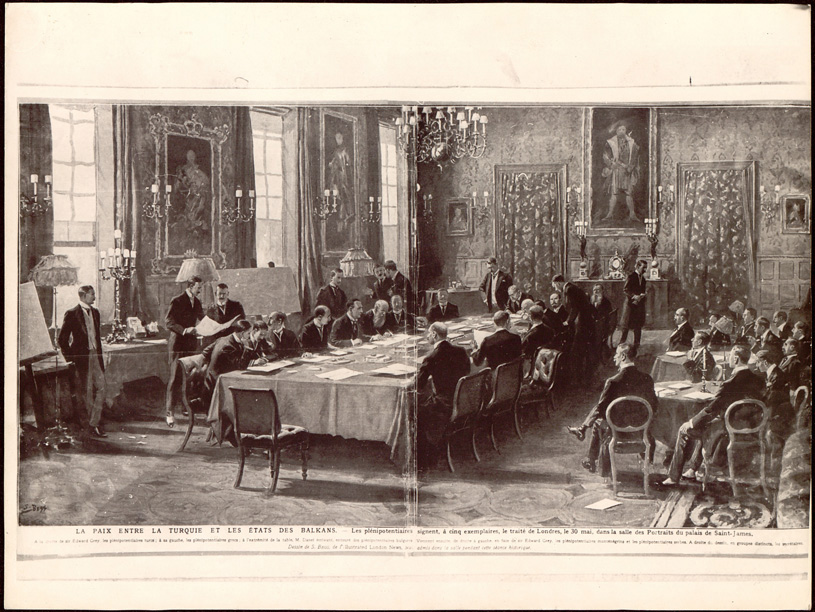
Signing of the Peace Treaty on 30 May 1913

The London Conference of 1912–1913, also known as the London Peace Conference or the Conference of the Ambassadors, was an international summit of the six Great Powers of that time (Austria-Hungary, France, Great Britain, Germany, Italy, and Russia) convened in December 1912 due to the successes of the Balkan League armies against the Ottoman Empire in the First Balkan War. In particular, the conference intended to arbitrate between the warring powers as to territorial acquisitions, and also to determine the future of Albania, whose independence was proclaimed during the conflict.

== History ==
An armistice to end the First Balkan War had been signed on 3 December 1912. The London Peace Conference was attended by delegates from the Balkan allies (including Greece) who had not signed the previous armistice, as well as the Ottoman Empire.

The Conference started in September 1912 at the St James's Palace under the chairmanship of Sir Edward Grey. Further sessions of the conference began on 16 December 1912, but ended on 23 January 1913, when the 1913 Ottoman coup d'état (also known as the Raid on the Sublime Porte) took place. Coup leader Enver Pasha withdrew the Ottoman Empire from the Conference.

On 30 May 1913, without the Ottoman Empire being present, the conference signed the Treaty of London (1913), an agreement under which Ottoman Empire would give up all territory west of the Enos-Midia line. After much discussion, the Ambassadors reached a formal decision on 29 July 1913, to establish the Principality of Albania as a sovereign state independent of the Ottoman Empire.

As a result of the decisions taken and because of pressures from Greece and Serbia, half of the territory claimed by the newly established Albanian state, and between 30% and 40% of the total Albanian population, was left out of the newly established Principality of Albania; in particular the Albanian-inhabited region of Kosovo Vilayet was given to Serbia and much of southern Chameria to Greece. Concerning the Greco-Albanian frontier, the only time the Great Powers intervened, was when Austria-Hungary and Italy forbid a Greek occupation of Vlorë, after the Greek navy had shelled the town on 3 December; as a result no Great Power opposed the cession of Ioannina to Greece (as long as they could take it).

A special boundary commission was sent to delineate the Greek-Albanian border. However, being unable to delineate the area on an ethnographic basis, it fell back upon economic, strategic and geographical arguments, which resulted in the decision of the London Conference to cede most of the disputed area to Albania. This turn of event catalyzed an uprising among the local Greek population, who declared the Autonomous Republic of Northern Epirus.

The situation of the Aromanians was also discussed. The Aromanians are a small ethnic group scattered throughout the Balkans. In the London Conference, it was proposed that all the lands inhabited by Aromanians, such as the Pindus and its area around, be granted to the new Albanian state to protect them from Greek and Serbian (as Serbia had annexed Vardar Macedonia) assimilatory policies. Such proposals were supported by the Kingdom of Romania. On the simultaneous Albanian Congress of Trieste, the Aromanians also demanded regional autonomy within Albania, but this was rejected as the Aromanians within the new fixed borders of Albania, excluding expansion proposals, did not live in compact areas. In the end, the Aromanians were neither annexed to Albania nor were they given autonomy.

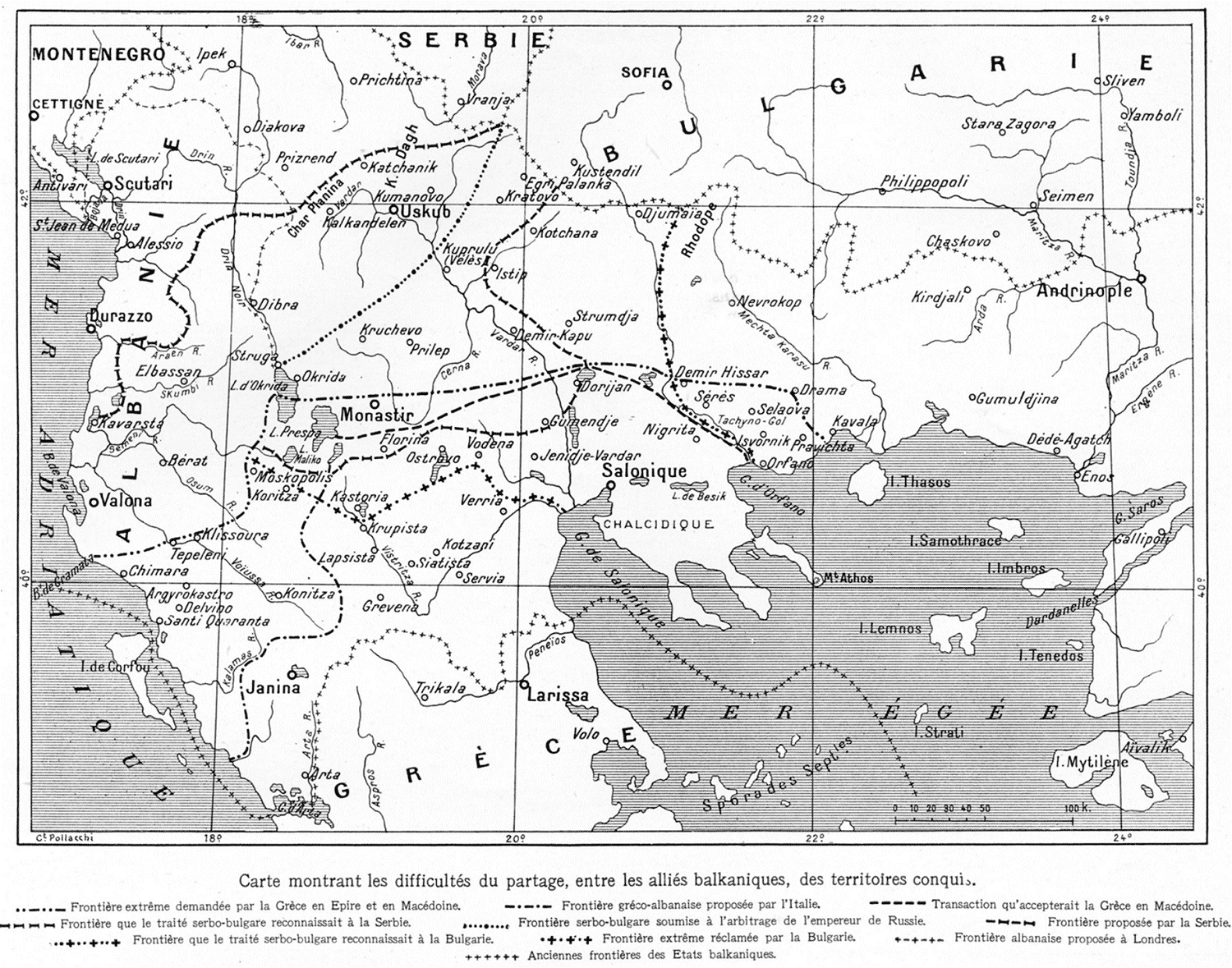
Rival territorial claims and proposals during the Conference

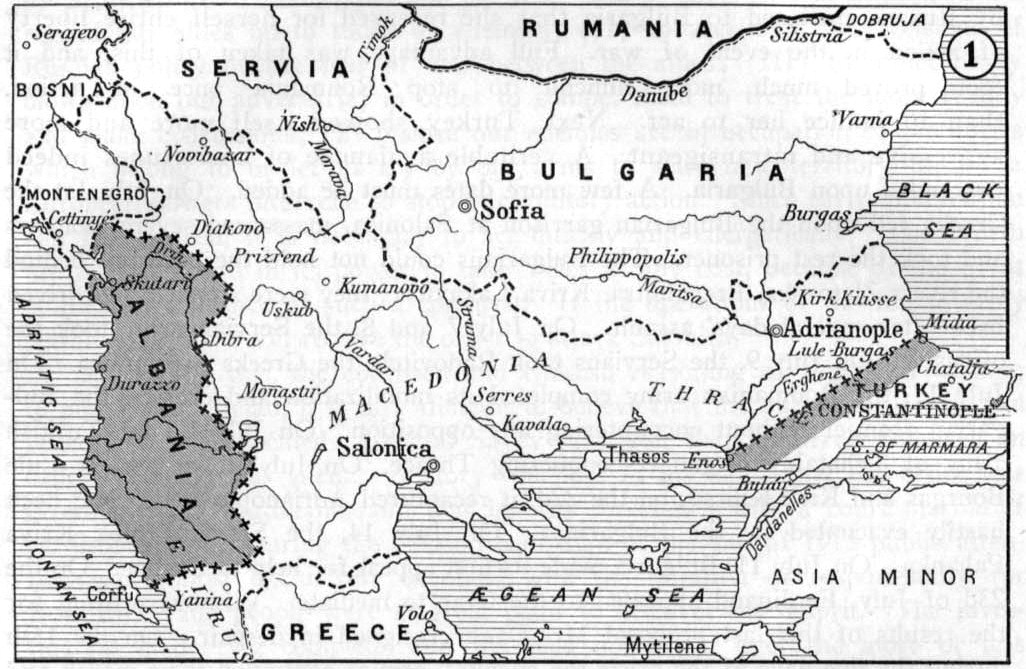
Map with the final territorial modifications; published in the Report of the International Commission on the Balkan Wars, 1914

== See also ==
- Concert of Europe
