= Alltuni family =

Noble family from Albania

Alltuni
- Current region: Central Albania
- Origin: Kavajë
- Founded: 18th Century
- Members: Ibrahim Aga Bostanxhiu; Omer Pashë Kavaja; Ruhije Alltuni; Shahsivar Alltuni
- Estate: 25 chifliks

The Alltuni were a wealthy and powerful Albanian feudal family at a time when the present day territory of Albania was under Ottoman rule. For almost two centuries they ruled over the entire region of Kavajë and large parts of the Myzeqe plains.

They self-claimed to be the descendants of an unidentified Kapudan Pasha, a beylerbey and great admiral from Ulqin, who allegedly married a daughter of Sultan Ahmed I. Their great wealth was accumulated through sea trade, especially in the exports of livestock.

The Alltuni made alliances with the Bushatlliu family of Shkodër who later rebelled against the Sublime Porte. Members of this powerful family formed blood ties through marriage with other notable Albanian families such as the Taushani family of Elbasan, the Toptani family of Krujë, the Karbunara (Shehu) family of Lushnjë and later the Zogolli family of Mat.

In traditional literature, the Alltuni are mentioned in Gjergj Fishta's epic poem Lahuta e malcis (p. 227 – Te ura e sutjeskës).

== Alltuni family tree ==
The origin of the "Alltuni" family name possibly derives from the Ottoman Turkish word altın which means golden.

Alltuni family tree
- بك Kapllan Pasha
  - Shahsivar Alltuni
    - أغا Ibrahim Aga Bostanxhiu (Commander of the mukata of Durrës).
      - Mahmud Alltuni
        - Married into the Taushani household.
      - Married to Kaje Hanëmi, the daughter of Mehmet Pashë Bushatlliu.
    - بك Sulejman Beu
      - Married into the Toptani household but later divorced to marry the widow (Kaje Hanëmi) of his older brother who had just died.
  - پاشا Omer Pasha (Vali of Iskodra from 1755–1757; Sanjak-bey of Elbasan and Avlona from 1756–1768).
    - Halil Pasha Alltuni
  - Mehmet Alltuni
    - شیخ Ibrahim Karbunara (Cleric, politician and one of the main organizers of the Congress of Lushnjë)
  - Ruhije Alltuni
    - Married into the Zogolli household (to Xhelal Pasha Zogu). Was the paternal grandmother of King Zog.
    - Xhemal Pasha Zogu
      - Zog I of Albania
  - Shahsivar Alltuni (Deputy subprefect, mayor and parliament member representing Kavajë. Married to King Zog's paternal aunt.)
