= Nosi =

Nosi may refer to:

- Nosı, a settlement in Arça District, Tatarstan, Russia
- Lef Nosi (1877–1946), Albanian politician
