= Ballie Mosque =

Mosque in Elbasan, Albania

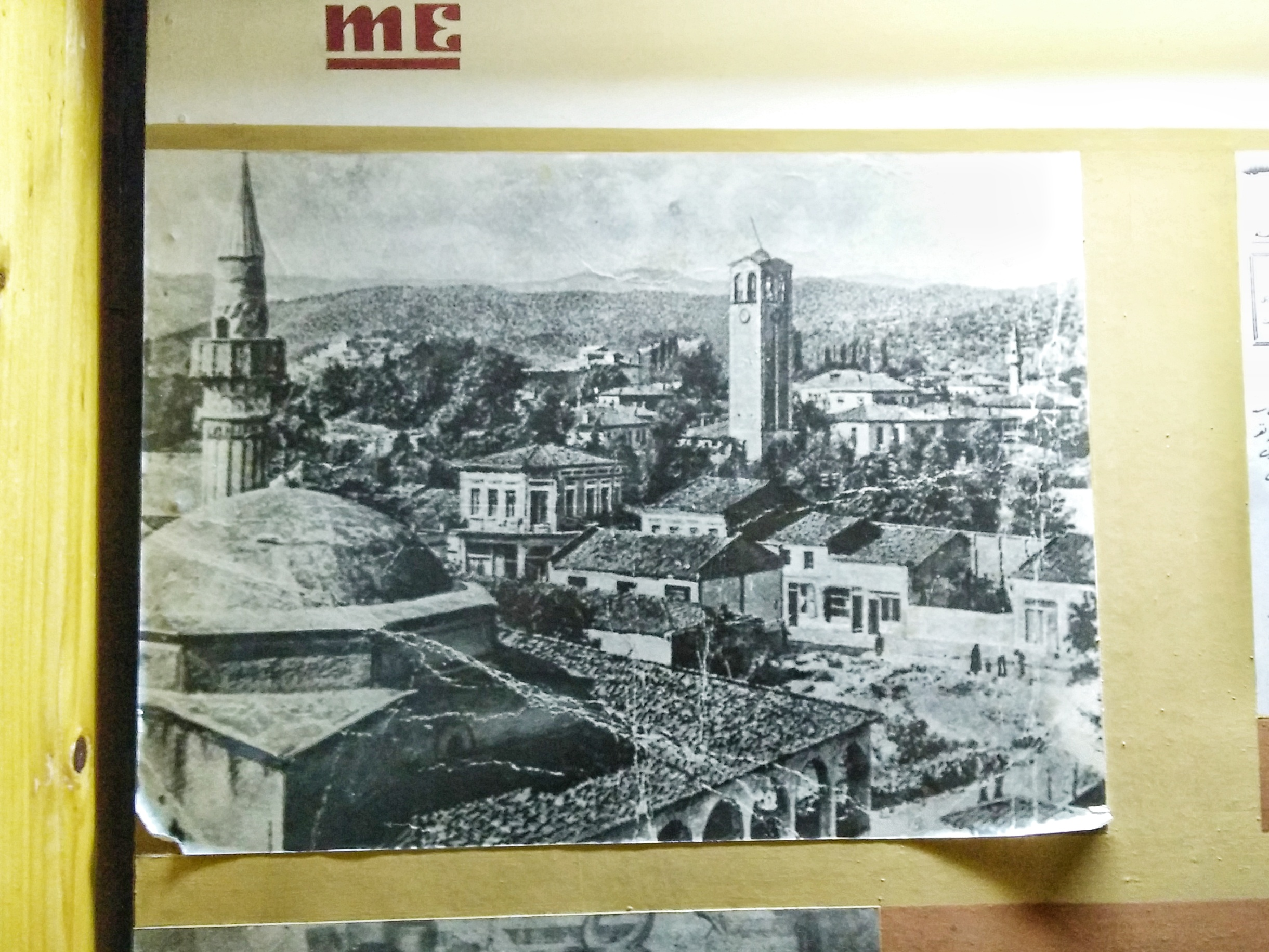
The original Ballija Mosque (left) before its destruction

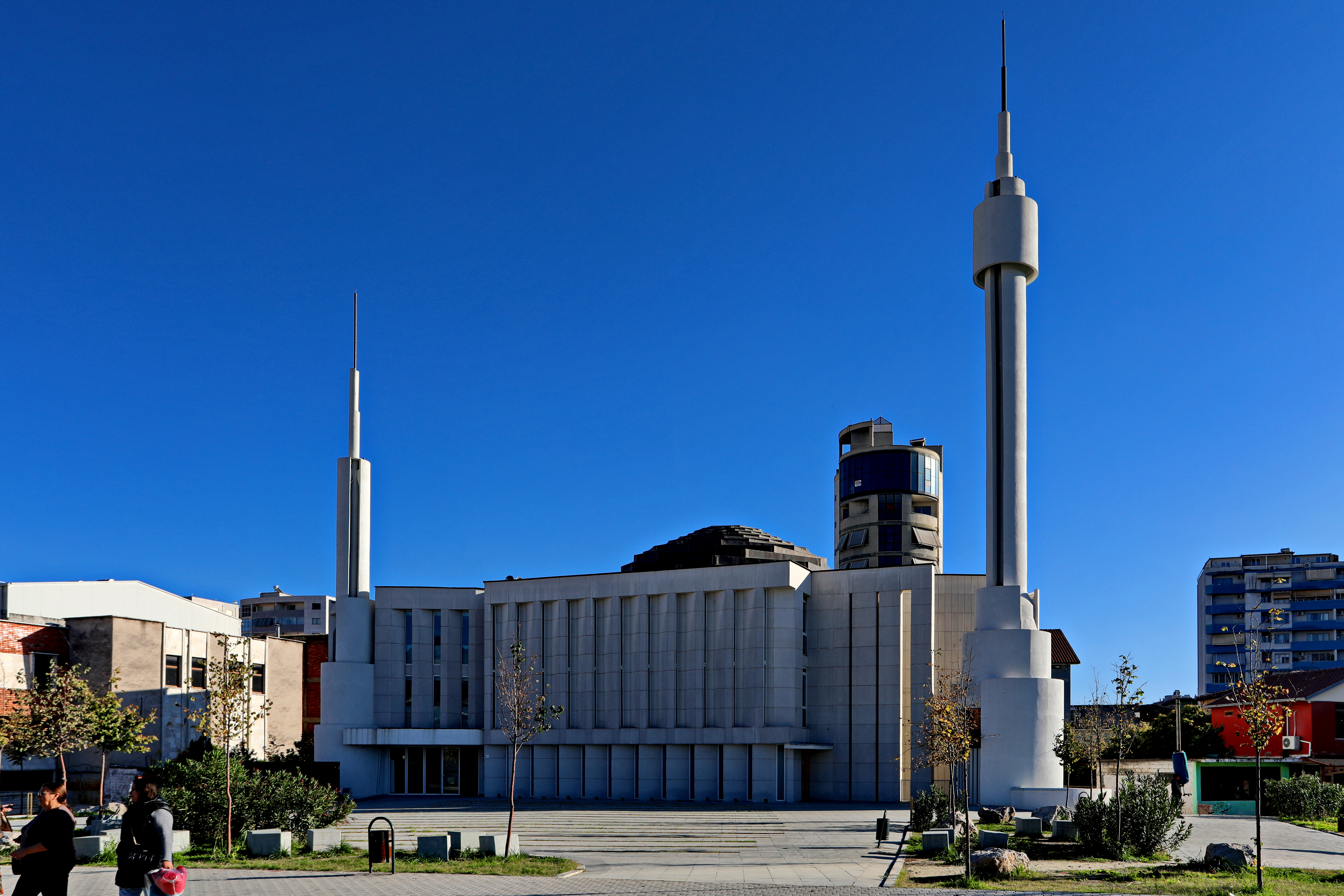
The modernist new building

The Ballije Mosque (Albanian: Xhamia e Ballies) was a mosque in the center of the city of Elbasan, Middle Albania built originally under the name of Hasan Balizade Mosque (Xhamia e Hasan Balizades) or Blue Mosque (Xhamia Blu) in 1608. After the communist dictatorship demolished the structure in 1967, a highly modernist and Western-style concrete building was erected on its site in 2023 which is also known today as the Mosque of Time (Xhamia e Kohës).

== History ==
The Ballije Mosque was visited by Evliya Chelebi; according to his accounts, it was built in the year 1017 AH (April 17, 1608 – April 6, 1609), a time when Sedefqar Mehmet Age Elbasani served as the leading architect of the Ottoman Empire. The builder wrote about the mosque: "In the name of Allah, Hasan Ballija built this house of worship, which resembles the heavens." The structure shared the same typological architectural style as the Naziresha Mosque built in 1599. Its functional components — the prayer hall, the portico (hayat) at the entrance, and the minaret on the right — completed a silhouette featuring a hemispherical dome supported by an octagonal drum.

For travelers, the mosque's most striking feature was its minaret; it stood out from all others due to its unique decorative design, particularly regarding the height of its shaft and its sherefe (balcony) — the only one of its kind in Albania. The family that managed the mosque prior to the communist takeover under Enver Hoxha was the Kulla family. The mosque was well known among merchants and pilgrims alike. The building was destroyed by the communist regime in 1967.

=== Reconstruction ===
Reconstruction began in 2023; however, the architecturally and historically significant structure was not rebuilt in its original form. Instead, a decision was made to adopt an ahistorical, modernist style that contrasted sharply with the surrounding area — which includes the Old Town with the Namasgah, the bazaar, the Clock Tower, and the Castle. Responsible for this project were the architects Artan Hysa, Premton Braha, Gentian Kica, Olsi Aluku, Ardiola Bardhoshi and Fiona Mali under the direction of chief architect Jurtin Hajro. Structural engineering was handled by Endri Zhuleku, interior and exterior lighting by the company Memo Lighting, and the interior fit-out by the company Officina Design. Although the new building sparked controversy, in 2025 it was named "Building of the Year 2025" in the "Religious Architecture" category by ArchDaily, the largest international architecture portal.

== Sources ==
- Xhamia e Hasan Balizades ose Xhamia e Ballies | ADE
