= Taushani family =

Noble family from Albania

The Taushani family was an Albanian aristocratic family prominent from the 15th to 19th century. According to prof. Stavri Naci, the most powerful families of Albania that played an important economic and political role were, "in Shkoder, the Bushati and Caushollaj; in Peja, Begollaj; in Elbasan, Taushani and Bicaku; in Vlora, Velabishtaj and Vlora; in Delvina, Kapllanpashalli; in Krujë, Toptani; and in Kavaja, the Alltuni."

== Members ==
According to the studies of Lef Nosi (scholar and Albanian political figure), some of the most notable members of this house included: Ahmet Pasha Taushani (1583) Mutasarrif of Elbasan; Isak and Ismail Bey (Mutasarrif); Sefer Vojvoda Taushani (1654); Abdullah Pasha Plaku Taushani (1740) (Mutasarrif of Elbasan and Delvina); Ahmet Pasha Taushani (1759) (Mutasarrif of Elbasan); Abdullah Pasha Taushani (1812-1820) and Abedin Pasha Taushani; Mehmet Pasha and Ahmet Bey.

=== Abdullah Pasha ===
Appointed Pasha of the city of Elbasan. Between 1812 and 1813, Abdullah Pasha, in the capacity of Sanjakbey of Elbasan (roughly equivalent to "district governor"), engaged in the process of the hygienization of the city by cleaning the water and sewage canals that originated from inside Elbasan Castle and finally depositing them in the Shkumbin river. Due to his later political activity against the interests of the Sultan, he was declared a rebel of the Sublime Porte (the Sultan). According to August Boppee, French consul in Janina, Kapllan Pasha of Krujë and Abdullah Pasha of Elbasan (Taushani) acted together with Ali Pasha Tepelena to protect their territories against their common enemies. Abduallah Pasha was also a member of the Ali Pashë Tepelena's Supreme Council of the Armed Forces. Other members of the Council included Myftar and Veli Pasha (Ali's sons), Xheladin bej Ohri and a number of his trusted men like Hasan Dervishi, Halil Patrona, Omar Vrioni, Meço Bono, Ago Myhyrdari, Thanas Vaja, Veli Gega (murdered by Katsantonis), and Tahir Abazi.

Due to his successful campaign in defending the city of Elbasan from the southern lords' advances, the people of Elbasan dedicated him a song:

Abdullah Pasha ne yzgji, Lebrit gjeti ne Shkumbi, Abdullah Pasha nje syzi, mbyti Lebrit ne Shkumbi (Dokumentet Historike te Lef Nosit, Albanian State Archive, Fondi 32, Dossier 47, pages 10–35).

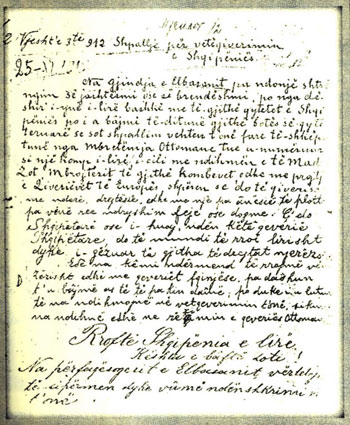
The Declaration of Independence of the City of Elbasan

After Ali Pasha's murder, the pro-Sultan fractions in Albania (including the Bushati family of Shkodër), set on fire Abadullah Pasha's saraye (palace).

=== Mehmet Pashë Taushani ===
Appointed Pasha of the City of Elbasan after the death of his uncle, Abdullah Pasha. According to Prof. Staver Naçi, after the occupation of Tirana, Durrës, and Krujë, the Pasha of Shkodër sent a letter to the paria (nobility) of the City of Elbasan asking them to surrender peacefully and to remove from power the allies of Ali Pasha Tepelena. Once the "paria" learned that Mustafa Pashe of Shkodër (Bushati), was on his way to invade Elbasan, they assembled and elected Mehmet Pasha Taushani (nephew of Abdullah Pashë Taushani from his father's side, and Abaz Pashë Dibra from mother's side) to lead the fight against the advancing troops.

=== Isuf Bey Taushani and Ismail Bey Xheladin Beu (Taushani) ===
Were among the signatories of the Declaration of Independence of the City of Elbasan on November 25, 1912. In a telegram sent to Ismail Bey Vlora, the signatories declared that "All the People of Elbasan, muslim and christian, in one voice, have accepted the Independence of Albania." (“I gjithe populli i Elbasanit, myslimane dhe te krishtere, me nje ze kane pranuar Indipendencen e Shqiperise”).

=== Abaz Bey Taushani ===
An Albanian army officer executed (together with Kamber Benja and Bexhet Manastiri) by the Austrian army after protesting against the removal of Albanian archeological objects from Apolonia, near Fier by the Austrian army. The protest note formulated by Abaz Bey, which was handed over to the Austrian authorities, stated the following: We protest against the removal of all archeological objects without the permission of the Albanian authorities. Although we believe that you have come to Albania as our allies, your hurriedness and escorted removal of all marble busts, golden and bronx rings, and all the painted ceramics with mythological figures that are part of our national history, is unfair and unacceptable. You may not remove the stone chest located within the turkish gymnasium in Berat because in reality, that chest is a crematorium that holds invaluable notes on the history and origin of ancient Illyrian towns.

After their removal, only some the objects managed to reach Austria where they remain exhibited to this day. For their courageous act, the Albanian Monarchy and later, Socialist Albania, proclaimed the fallen officers "Deshmore te Monumenteve" (Martyrs of the Monuments).

In the framework of the 100th anniversary of the declaration of independence and creation of the Albanian Armed Forces, the Ministry of Defense in cooperation with the Academy of Sciences of Albania, declared September 29 as the "National Day of Cultural Heritage" in honor of the three fallen heroes. They were also decorated with the highest military medal for Albanian officers for their extraordinary efforts in preserving the cultural riches of the country. The Albanian movie Dëshmoret e Monumenteve (see Albanian 1980s movies) is also based upon this event.

Abaz Bey was also a leading officer in the Albanian volunteer forces (Albanian: Mëmëdheu) fighting the Greek invasion of the city of Korçë and the surrounding areas.

Abaz Bey also led the Albanian forces entering the city of Lushnjë. According to the memoirs of Ahment Shehu, as soon as Abaz entered the city, he immediately replaced the Esadist flag with the national Albanian flag. See Si e perballoi Lushnja pushtimin Austro-Hungarez ne vitet 1916-1918

=== Zyber Bey Taushani (the Vlora branch of the family) ===
Described in the Memoirs of Eqrem Bey Vlora: "Zyber Bey Taushani (of the well known aristocratic family from Elbasan)...was a true knight who knew no fear, a true caballero, dressed in the picturesque Albanian national costume...

=== Ismail Bey Taushani (Halla) ===
Members of this family were also part of the nobility of the city of Vlora. In 1764, Ismail Pashe Velibishti, vezir of Vlora and Berat, was declared a rebel by the Sultan and a ferman was issued for his death. The vezir rebelled against the Sultan. He found support among some of the nobility of the city of Vlora (headed by Ismail Bey Taushani/Halla, who had married the vezir's aunt). He also found support from his brothers' in law, Kurt Pasha of Berat and Suleiman Pasha of Elbasan, who provided troops to the rebellion. The rebellion was crushed by the pro-Turkish forces. Ismail Pashe Velibishti was killed inside his uncle's house (Ismail Bey Taushani) and his head was sent to the Sultan.

Halil Beu's song:

Halil Bej O Halil Bej, Ku ma le nusen e re, Ja lash nanes, ja lash babait, Ja lash motres e vellait.

Halil Bej po te thot nana rri mos ik, Do te jap Lemcen me ciflig, Nuk e du Lemcen me nji kam, Do shkoj ne Misir te marre nji zonj te ran.

Vuna kamen permbi shal, se c'po qajne kto agallare, Vuna kamen ne yzgji, se c'po qajn kto temavi.

C'ka gjemia (anija) qe s'ban kam, kthehu Halil se po qan jot'am, C'ka gjemia qe s'ban prrap, ktheu Halil se po te therret yt'at, C'ka gjemia qe s'can dysh, ktheu Halil se te thrret yt'gjysh.
