= Kavaja (disambiguation) =

Kavaja may refer to the Municipality of Kavajë.

Kavaja may also refer to:

- Kavajë District
- Besa Kavajë
- Kavaja Street
- Bahri Kavaja (1924–1987)
- Nikola Kavaja (1932–2008)
- Omer Pashë Kavaja
- Kavaja United
