= Shefqet =

Shefqet is a given name. Notable people with the name include:

- Shefqet Dajiu, one of the signatories of the Albanian Declaration of Independence in 1912
- Shefqet Krasniqi (born 1966), Kosovar Muslim cleric and scholar of Islam
- Shefqet Pllana (1918–1994), ethnic Albanian ethnographer and scholar from Kosovo
- Ali Shefqet Shkupi (1883–1953), Chief of Supreme Staff of the Albanian Army
- Shefqet Stringa (1896–1947), banking pioneer in Albania
- Shefqet Topi (1934–1998), Albanian footballer
- Shefqet Vërlaci (1877–1946), Albanian politician, wealthy landowner, the 12th Prime Minister of Albania

== See also ==
- University Hospital "Shefqet Ndroqi", tuberculosis sanatorium established in Fuat Bey Hill, Tirana in 1945
