= Elbasan railway station =

Railway station in Elbasan, Albania

Elbasan railway station Stacioni hekurudhor i Elbasanit
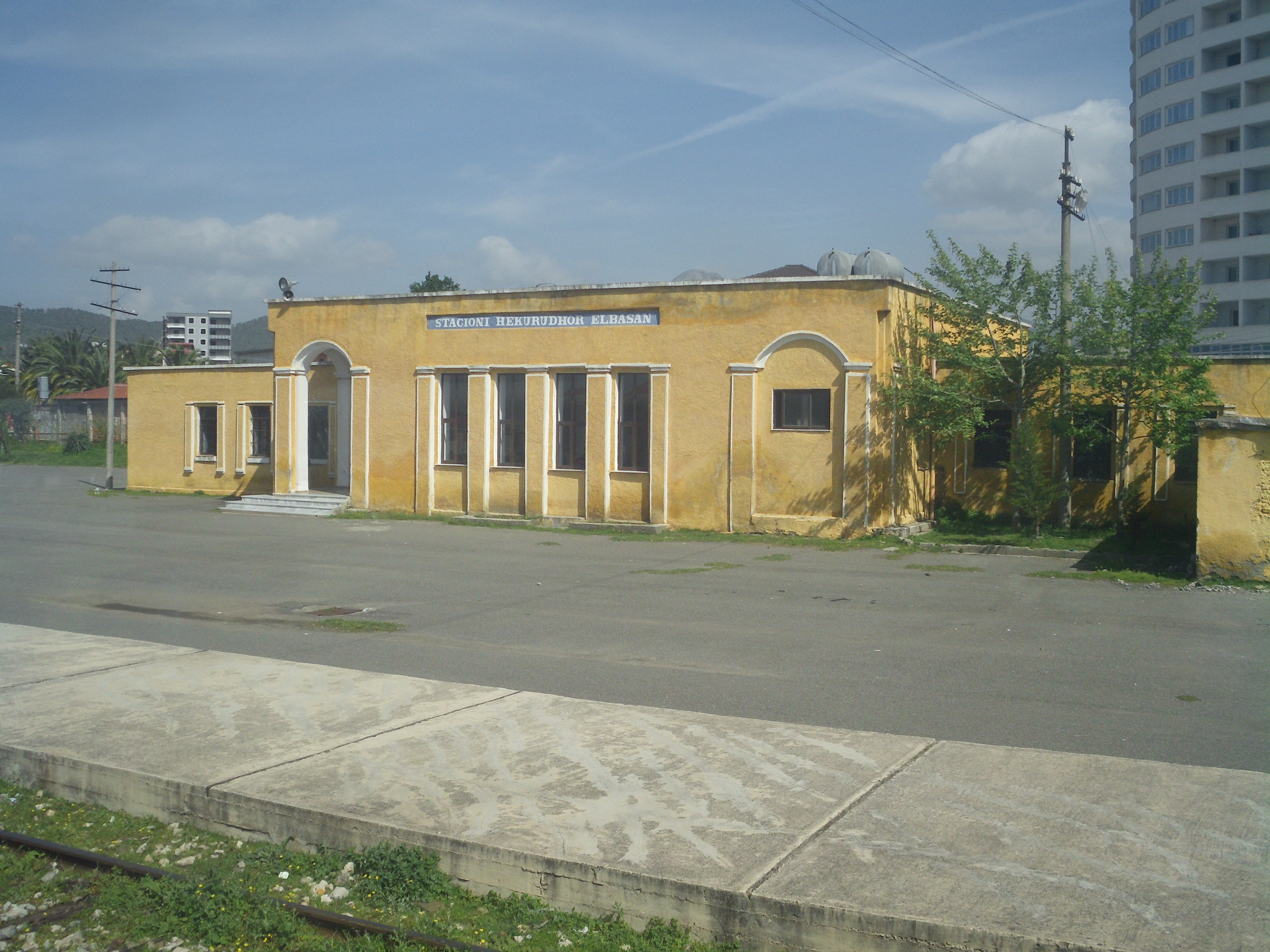
- The station in 2014

General information
- Location: Elbasan; Elbasan County; Albania
- Coordinates: 41.1050°N 20.0747°E
- System: Hekurudha Shqiptare
- Line: Rrogozhinë–Elbasan(–Pogradec)

History
- Opened: 21 December 1950
Location
- Location within Albania

Elbasan railway station (Albanian: Stacioni hekurudhor i Elbasanit) is a railway station serving the city of Elbasan in Central Albania, the fourth most populous city of the Republic of Albania.

== History ==
The station was opened in 1950. At opening, it was the terminus of an extension from Peqin. It remained the terminus until March 1974, when an extension to Përrenjas was completed.

The line beyond Elbasan, which runs through extremely sparsely populated regions of the country, was closed in 2012 and Elbasan again became a terminus.

Plans have existed since the late 2000s to build a new line to Elbasan from the capital Tirana to allow more direct movement between the two cities and replace the circuitous route which currently exists.

== See also ==
- List of railway stations in Albania
- Rail transport in Albania
- History of rail transport in Albania
- Transport in Albania
