= Sokrat Dodbiba =

Albanian economist and politician

Sokrat Anastas Dodbiba
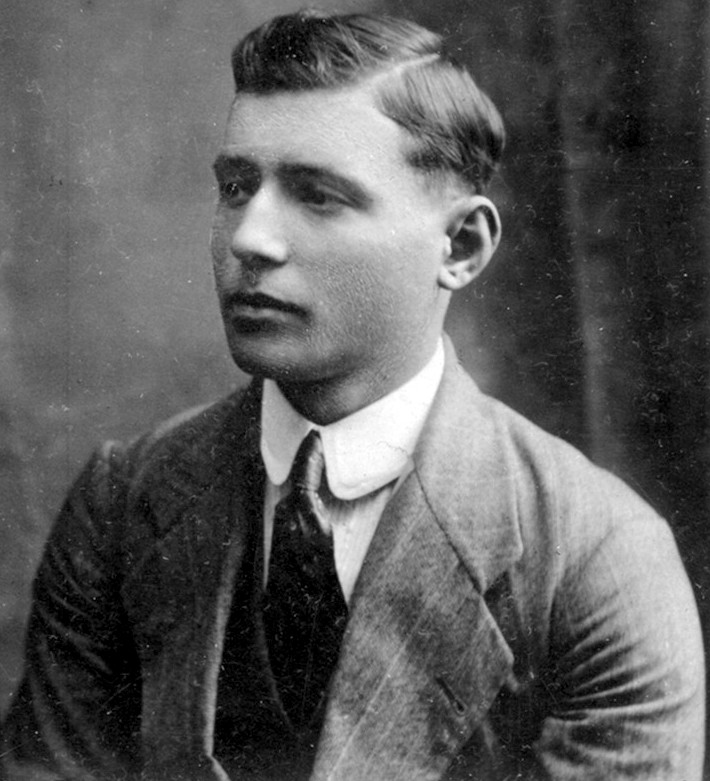
- Born: 17 March 1898; Elbasan, Ottoman Empire (modern day Albania)
- Died: 20 October 1956 (aged 58); Burrel Prison, Burrel, People's Socialist Republic of Albania
- Occupations: Economist, clerk, politician
- Known for: Minister of Finance of Albania, 1943-44
- Parent(s): Anastas Dodbiba (father), Polikseni Nosi (mother)
- Relatives: Lef Nosi (uncle), Vasil Nosi (first cousin), Jani Dodbiba (brother), Pirro Dodbiba (nephew), Niko Dodbiba (nephew), Bardhyl Dodbiba (nephew), Henrieta Dodbiba (niece)
- Family: Dodbiba

Sokrat Dodbiba (17 March 1898 – 20 October 1956) was an Albanian economist and politician who served as Minister of Finance of Albania during 1943–44.

== Life ==
Dodbiba was born in Elbasan, back then Ottoman Empire, today modern Albania, in the Orthodox Christian community of the "Kala" (Castle) neighborhood, a small community but with prominent members. He was the son of Anastas Dodbiba and Polikseni Nosi (sister of Albanian politician Lef Nosi). He took his first lessons in his neighborhood's school, first in Greek language, later in Albanian. Dodbiba studied later in the Robert College of Istanbul where between others he was taught by Sali Nivica.

In 1921, he went to Vienna, Austria to follow his graduate studies in the Faculty of Economical Sciences. During that time, he was engaged with the "Albania" Society of the Albanian students, and contributed in establishing the Djalëria (Fellowhood) newspaper of this society.

He returned to Albanian with a graduate degree in Political Economy. In 1932, Dodbiba started working in the Ministry of Finances as Head of Receivables Department. He was assigned to publish the newspaper Ekonomisti shqiptar (The Albanian economist) after he had published several articles in contemporary press organs. Soon-after he moved on up as Chief-administrator of the Ministry of Finances of Albania, and later commissioner of the National Bank of Albania where he worked until 1943.

During the Nazi occupation of Albania, he became member of the cabinet of Rexhep Mitrovica as Minister of Finance. One of his achievements was the retrieval the amount of 120 million golden francs (Albanian: franga ari) from the Bank of Italy, which was deposited in the National Bank. At the same period, he brought to Albania the machinery for money printing for the first time. Meanwhile, some of his nephews were engaged on the opposite front, affiliated with the partisans of the National Liberation Movement. The most prominent is Pirro Dodbiba, who would server later as Minister of Agriculture of Albania and member of the Politburo.

In December 1944 he was arrested by the Communists. He was one of the many political figures of the Italian occupation and German occupation periods who were tried in Special Court of 1945. He was sentenced to 30 years, and died in Burrel Prison in 1956.
