= Pirro Dodbiba =

Albanian politician (1925–2004)

Pirro Dodbiba (1925–2004) was an Albanian politician of the Albanian Party of Labour (PPSh). Although the nephew of Sokrat Dodbiba, former Minister of Finance in the quisling government of Rexhep Mitrovica during World War II who died in communist prisons, he chose from the beginning the opposite path joining the National Liberation Movement. He served as Party's representative in various places in Communist Albania, and by early 1970s became candidate-member for the Politburo of the Party of Labour of Albania, the highest political ruling entity of that time.

== Biography ==
Dodbiba came from an influential Orthodox Christian family from Elbasan in central Albania. He was the son of Jani Dodbiba and Athina Buda (sister of Albanian historian Aleks Buda). His uncle Sokrat Dodbiba was a known economist and intellectual, who between November 1943 and July 1944 served as Minister of Finance. He would be prosecuted by the Special Court of Albania, 1945 and died in prison. Pirro's brother Niko served as ambassador to People's Republic of Bulgaria, while the other brother Bardhyl as officer of the armed forces. His sister Henrieta was married to the Albanian poet Llazar Siliqi. Dodbiba is also related to the Lef Nosi, another prominent Albanian politician of the early 20th century, through his grandmother Polikseni Nosi the sister of Lef Nosi, which married his grandfather Anastas Dodbiba. He would’ve also been a distant relative of Klara Buda.

During World War II he took part from 1942 to 1944 as member of the "Dajti" communist partisan battalion and was later political commissar. After the war, he studied Agricultural Science at the Timiryazev Agricultural Academy (the State Agrarian University of the Soviet Union) from 1945 to 1950, and graduated with a diploma from it in Agricultural Planning. On his return, he served first as Deputy Minister of Agriculture, before becoming director and founder of the 1951 Tirana Agricultural Institute (Alb: Instituti i Lartë Bujqësor).

Dodbiba, who had become also member of the Central Committee of the Party, followed from 1956 to 1966 as Head of the Department of Agriculture of the Central Committee. In 1962, he was First Deputy of the People's Assembly (Alb: Kuvendi Popullor). He remained member of the parliament from fifth to the eighth legislature.

On 1 January 1965, he was appointed Minister of Agriculture in the government of Prime Minister Mehmet Shehu, and served as such until his release on 29 April 1976. During his tenure, livestock farming became increasingly important; there were estimated steadily growing targets by the Central Committee for after 1971. In previous years there were repeated problems in the agricultural sector and the non-achievement of planning objectives in agricultural production. In addition, he appealed for rapid modernization and consolidation of state farms to the leadership of the party. As a minister, he led an agricultural delegation on a trip to the People's Republic of China in 1971, and met with Chinese Premier Zhou Enlai and the Minister of Agriculture and Forestry Sha Feng.

During the 6th Congress of the PPSh in November 1971 he was elected candidate-member of its Politburo. He remained in this position until his retirement in April 1976. On November 15, 1976, he also lost his seat in the National Assembly. The reason for his dismissal as Minister of Agriculture in April 1976 was "professional failure" in the implementation of the production targets in agriculture.

After the collapse of communism, he was elected in 2003 Chairman of the National Committee of War Veterans of the Anti-Fascist National Liberation War of the Albanian People (Alb: Komiteti Kombëtar i Veteranëve të Luftës Antifashiste Nacional-Clirimtare të Popullit Shqiptar). Dodbiba died in April 2004.
