= St. Mary's Church, Elbasan =

15th-century church in Albania

Coordinates: 41.1155°N 20.0804°E

St. Mary's Church
- Kisha e Shën Mërisë (Albanian)
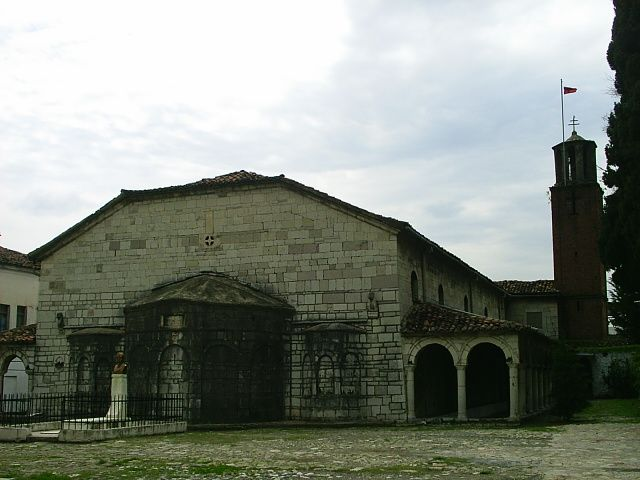
- Interactive map of St. Mary's Church
- Location: Elbasan

History
- Built: 1556; 470 years ago

Cultural Monument of Albania

The St. Mary's Church (Albanian: Kisha e Shën Mërisë) is an Orthodox church and monastery in Elbasan, Albania. Built during Ottoman times in the Vlach neighbourhood, it became a Cultural Monument of Albania in 1963. In the 1990s, the church became the seat of a split faction of the Orthodox Autocephalous Church of Albania under At Nikolle Marku, which criticizes the Greek influence over the Orthodox in Albania.

The church's building started in 1483 in the Vlach neighborhood, but it ended almost a century later: the church had its first religious services only in 1556. It was built entirely in stone in a completely particular way, with stones carved in the shape of a cross, which can still be seen today. The church was frescoed by Onufri and restored by David Selenica. In the 18th century, it was entirely burned by a fire, so it was rebuilt at the beginning of the 19th century. Some of the most famous preachers in the church have been Fan Noli and Visarion Xhuvani. In 2008 the Albanian government again financed the reconstruction of the church.
