= Ibrahim Karbunara =

Albanian Islamic scholar (1879–1947)

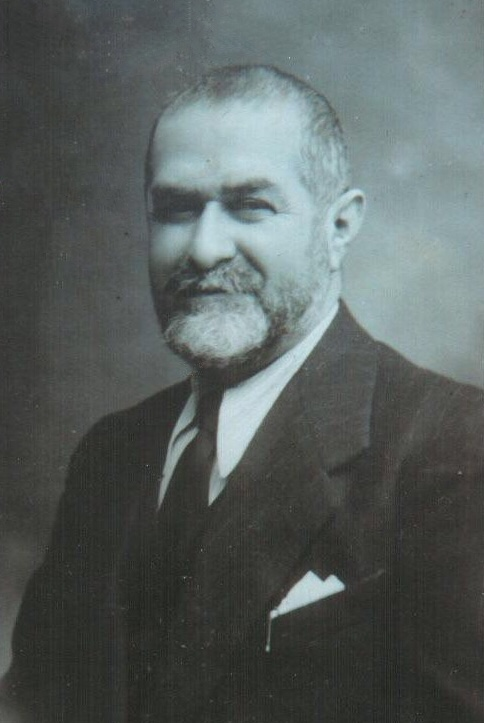
Portrait of Ibrahim Krbunara

Ibrahim Haki Karbunara (1879–1947) was an Albanian Islamic scholar of the Khalwati tariqa, the Mufti of Lushnjë, and a figure in the Albanian National Awakening. He supported Ismail Kemal’s Albanian Declaration of Independence, attended the Congress of Lushnjë, and assisted the June Revolution of 1924.

During World War II, he joined the National Liberation Movement, and he was appointed a deputy in Lushnjë after the war. He was among the first deputies to be convicted of treason by the People's Socialist Republic of Albania and sentenced to hang with his son, Hysen, who shot Josif Pashko.

== Biography ==
Born in Karbunarë, near Lushnjë, Karbunarë was the son of Rushidi and Hamdija. They belonged to a branch of the powerful noble Alltuni family.

He went to madrasa in Berat. For higher education, Karbunara travelled to Istanbul, where he learned five languages: Arabic, Turkish, Persian, English, and French. He also came into contact during these years with activists of the Albanian National Awakening. After graduation, he returned to his khanqah (Albanian: teqe) in Karbunarë, until 1909, when the Young Turks government detained him in Peqin for “disturbing the millets.”

In November 1912, Karbunara became the Mufti of Lushnjë. He and Nebi Sefa helped Ismail Kemal escape from Myzeqe to Vlorë. During the short reign of Wilhelm, Prince of Albania, Karbunara signed a note of protest on behalf of Debar and Chameria, which envoy Turhan Pasha Përmeti brought to the Paris Peace Conference (1919–1920) to advocate for Albanian sovereignty. During the Peasant Revolt of 1914, Karbunara also helped dissuade insurgents in Lushnjë from attacking government volunteers passing through.

He also joined Besim Nuri, Ferit Vokopola, and Eshref Frashëri as local delegates at the Congress of Lushnjë; Vokopola gave the opening address and Karbunara blessed the end. From 1920 to 1924, he belonged to the democratic party of deputies backing Fan Noli, and he backed Noli in the 1924 June Revolution, fleeing with other supporters to Italy after King Zog I of Albania took power that December. He joined the centrist anti-Zog exile group, Bashkimi Kombëtar.

He returned to Albania after the Italian invasion of Albania, and in 1943, the fascist authorities burned down his house and khanqah. The German occupation forces imprisoned him in 1944, after the Italian surrender. His khanqah became a meeting place for the National Liberation Movement (Albanian: Frontit Nacional-Çlirimtar) that he supported.

When the FNÇ took power in the 1945 Albanian parliamentary election, Karbunara was elected a deputy from the Lushnjë district. Joining the opposition, he was prosecuted and executed for allegedly “forming a traitorous organization linked to war criminals foreign and domestic aided by agents of Anglo-American imperialism, an organization that committed acts of sabotage, espionage, and terrorism to overthrow the people’s power and raise an oppressive regime of the [monarchist] Legality Movement Party.” His son was shot in front of him, and their remains have yet to be found.

== Persecution of his family ==
Karbunara's nephew Beqiri was also shot. The Karbunara family was evicted from their home and their lands confiscated, and they were forced to live in a collective estate in Lushnjë. The remaining men in the family were subjected to a combined 123 years in prison.
