= Shefqet Stringa =

Albanian businessman (1896–1947)

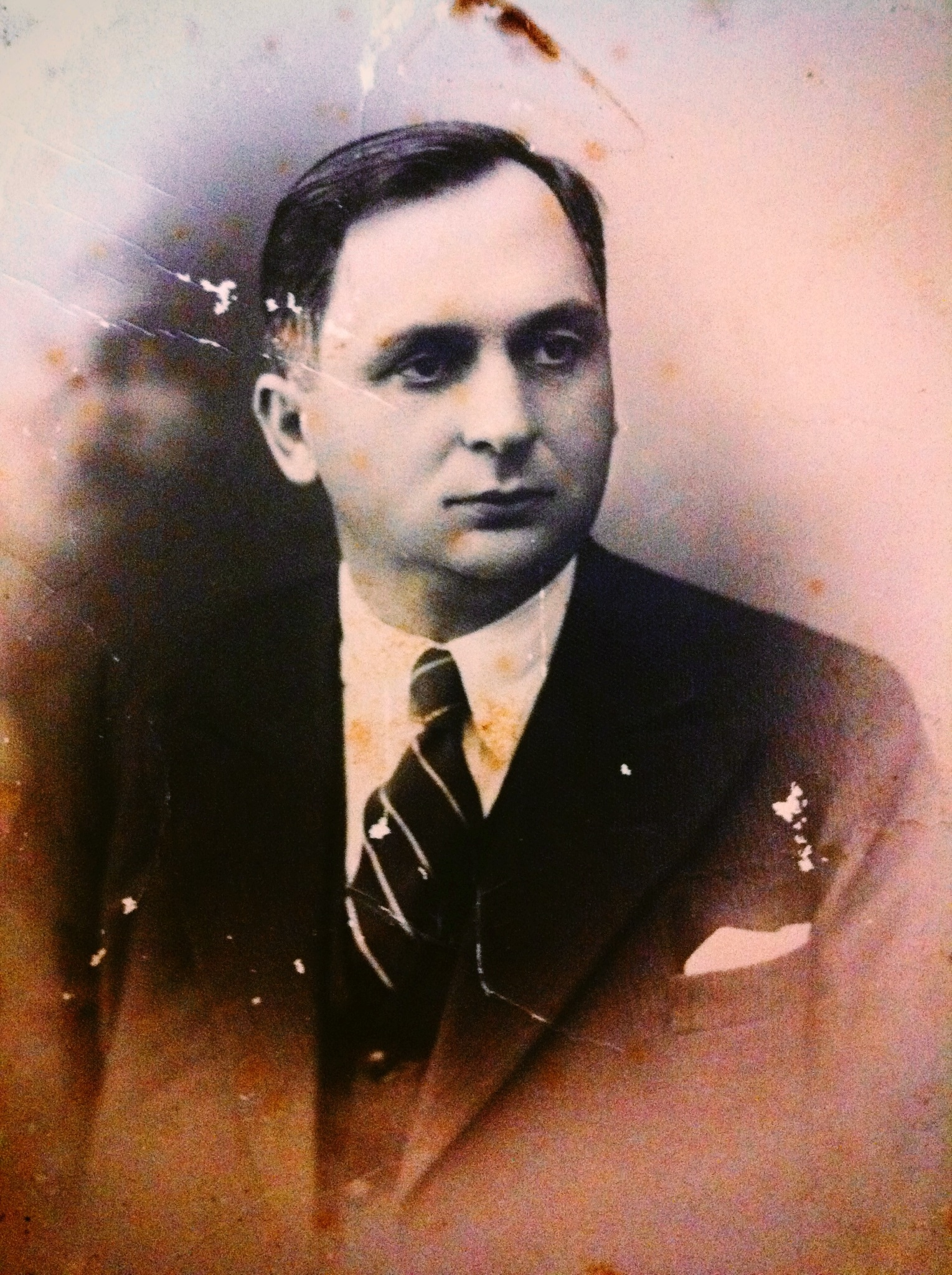
- Born: Shefqet Mehmetali Stringa; 1896; Elbasan, League of Prizren, Ottoman Empire
- Died: 31 October 1947 (aged 50-51)
- Education: Business Academy of Vienna
- Occupation: Banking
- Years active: 1930–1946
- Spouse: Razije Stringa
- Children: 3

Shefqet Mehmetali Stringa (1896–31 October 1947) was a banking pioneer in Albania.

== Biography ==
Shefqet Stringa was born in Elbasan, a city in central Albania, to a very well educated family. His father was a financier of the Turkish administration during the Ottoman regime. He attended his school in Elbasan. During the academic term of 1917–1918, the mayor of the city of Elbasan, Aqif Bicaku, and the Austrian Colonel Zitkovski, gave scholarships to a group of students, including Shefqet Stringa. He continued his studies in the Business Academy of Vienna, and received a doctorate on 7 July 1922.

During his studies in Austria, Shefqet Stringa was active in the student organization "Albania", established in 1918. He was one, in a group of scholars who wrote a letter to the Peace Conference in Paris, who gave his contribution. In 1920 Shefqet and other students contributed their savings to help other Albanians publish the first Albanian magazine, Djaleria, in Vienna. After his graduation, he was employed by the Credit Bank in Vienna but resigned in 1923 and returned to his homeland. From April 1923 until December 1924, he worked as a translator for the finance director, while Ahmet Zogu was Prime Minister and Minister of the Foreign Exchange in Albania.

From 1930 to 1933, Stringa established the first private banking agency in Elbasan. In 1933 he became the director of the National Bank of Albania. One year later he was appointed a director of the Business Room for the city of Elbasan. In November 1939 Shefqet Stringa was appointed as a director of the Elbasan branch, financed by Banka di Napoli. He held the position until 1946.

He was offered the Executive Director's job for the Bank of Albania, which he refused. Shefqet never agreed with a government whose power didn't come from the people. This led to his arrest as a political prisoner. As someone who was accused of a crime against the state, he was not given the right to present a defense before the court. Shefqet Stringa died on 31 October 1947 without any trial at court. He left his wife, Razije, and three sons, Dashamir, Mehmetali, and Adhurim.
