= Peqin railway station =

Railway station in Elbasan County, Albania

Peqin railway station Stacioni hekurudhor i Peqinit
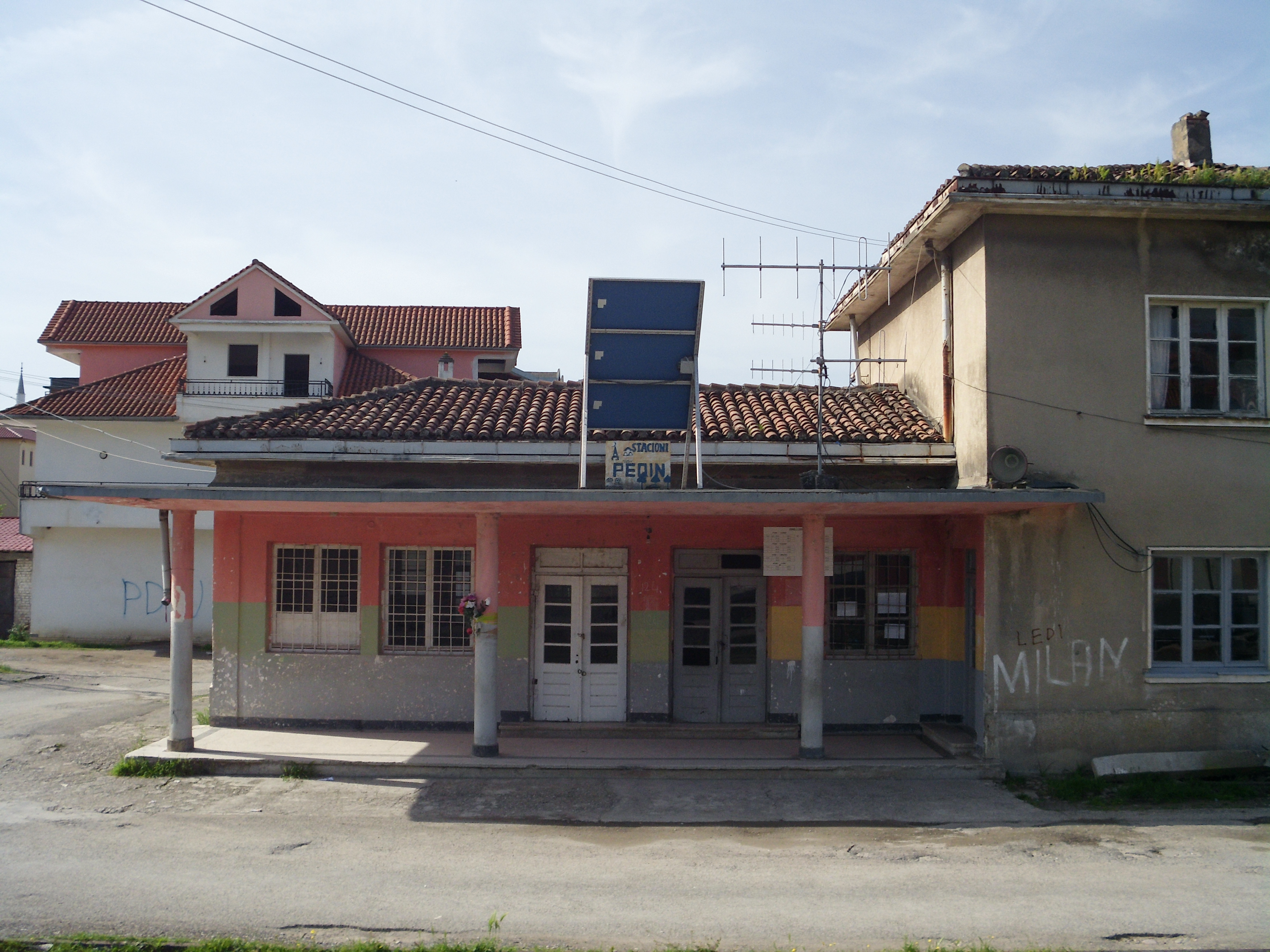
- The station in 2014

General information
- Location: Peqin; Elbasan County; Albania
- Coordinates: 41.0477°N 19.7491°E
- System: Hekurudha Shqiptare
- Line: Durrës-Elbasan(-Pogradec)

History
- Opened: 7 November 1947
Location
- Location within Albania

Peqin railway station (Albanian: Stacioni hekurudhor i Peqinit) is a railway station serving the town of Peqin in Elbasan County in Central Albania.

== History ==
Peqin was the terminus of Albania's first passenger railway line. The 27-mile route was completed with assistance from the Socialist Federal Republic of Yugoslavia, but completion was delayed after the final shipment of 1,700 tons of rails did not arrive promptly from Zenica. After Nako Spiru made repeated requests to the Belgrade administration, the shipment arrived at Durrës on 12 October 1947, but was not unloaded for three days.

Peqin remained the terminus of the line until 23 February 1949 when the line was extended to Tirana.

== See also ==
- List of railway stations in Albania
- Rail transport in Albania
- History of rail transport in Albania
- Transport in Albania
