= Nosı =

Nosı Носы
- selo
- Location within Tatarstan
- Country: Russia
- Region: Tatarstan
- District: Arça District
- Municipality: Şuşmabaş rural settlement
- Time zone: UTC+3:00

Nosı (Tatar: Носы, romanized: Nosı) is a rural locality (a selo) in Arça District, Tatarstan. The population was 321 as of 2010. Nosı is located 42 km from Arçа, district's administrative centre, and 112 km from Ԛazаn, republic's capital, by road. The earliest known record of the settlement dates from 1678. There are 2 streets in the village.
