= Elbasan =

Fourth largest city of Albania

Elbasan Elbasani
- Municipality
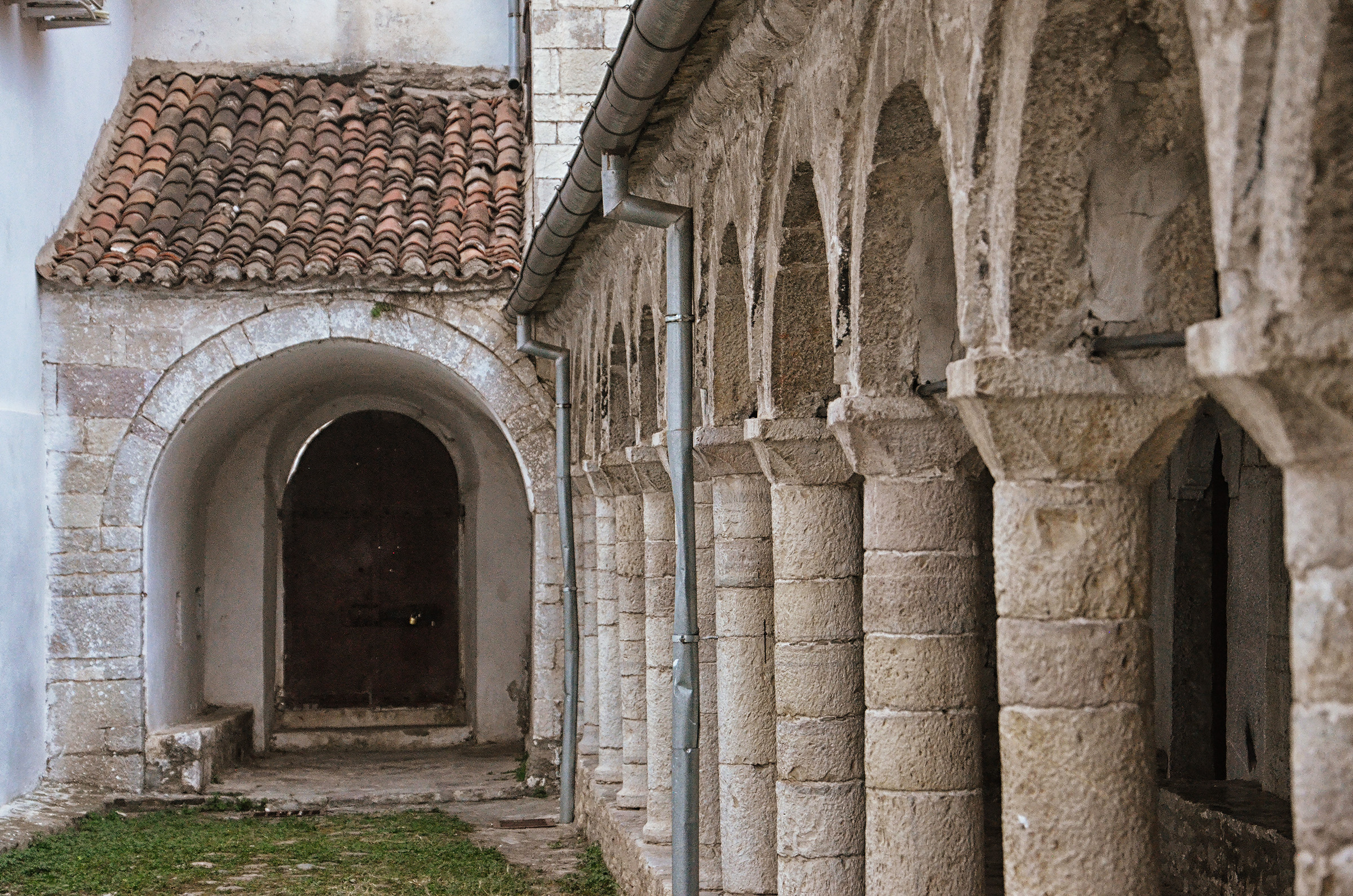
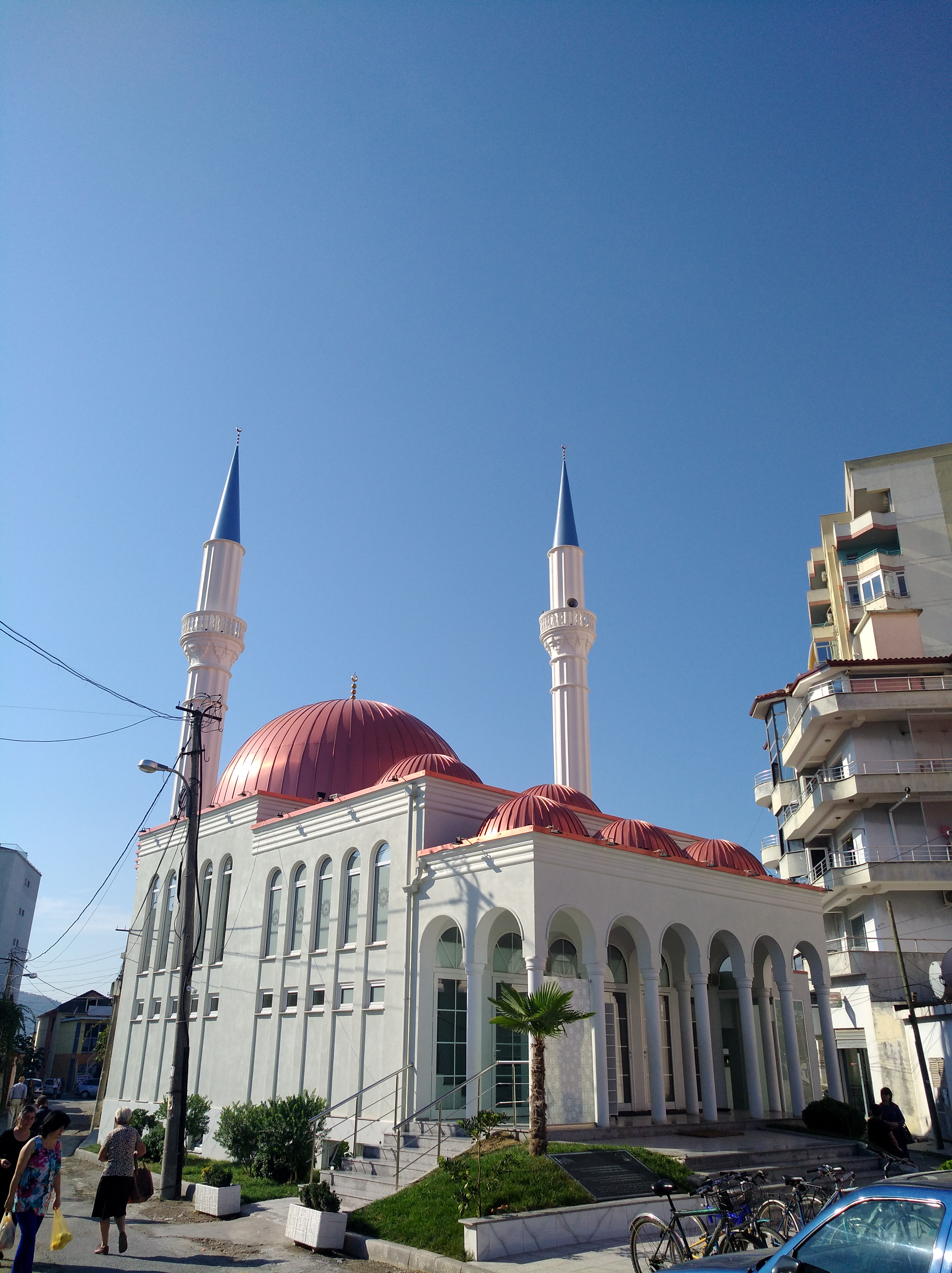
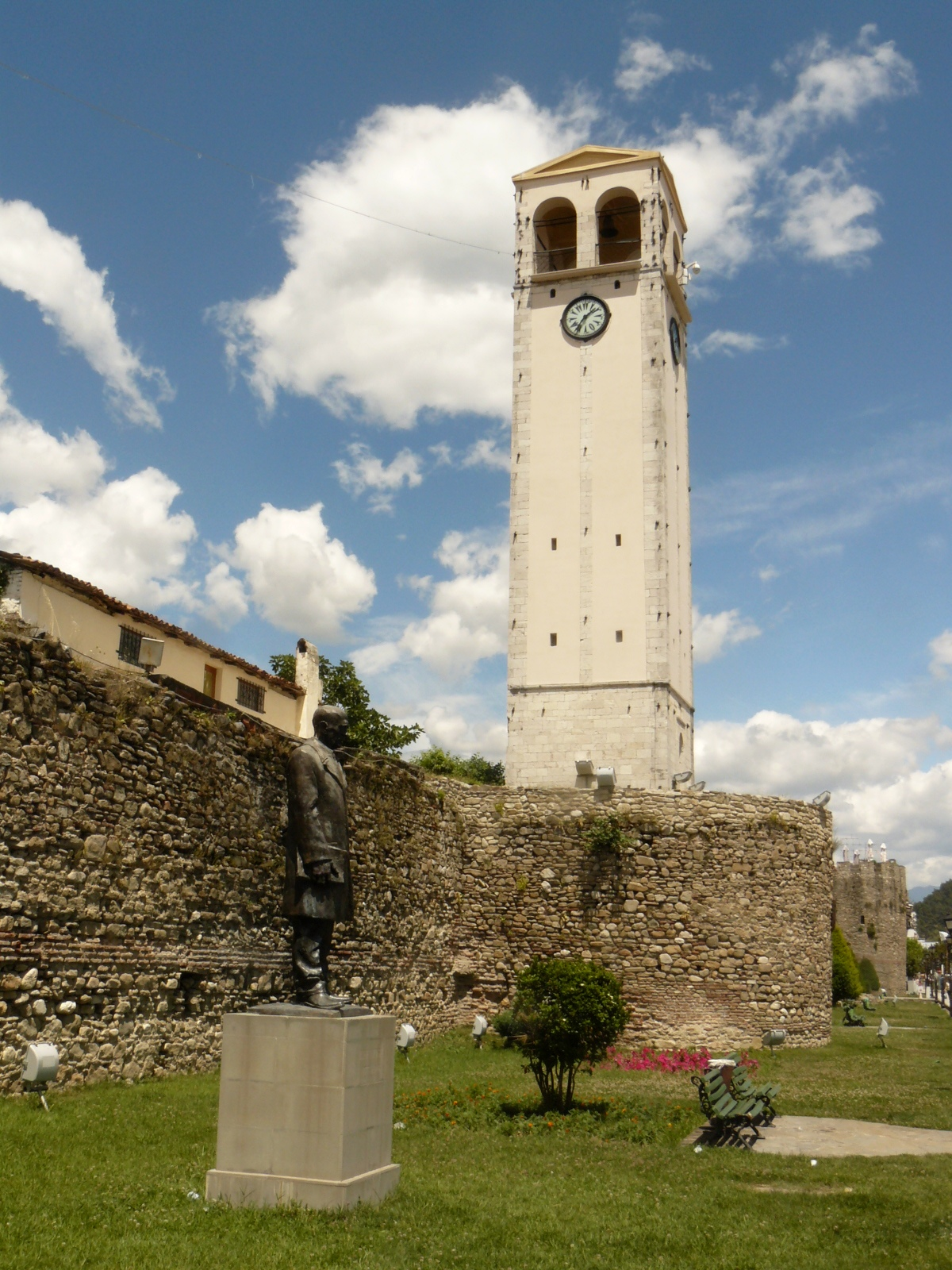
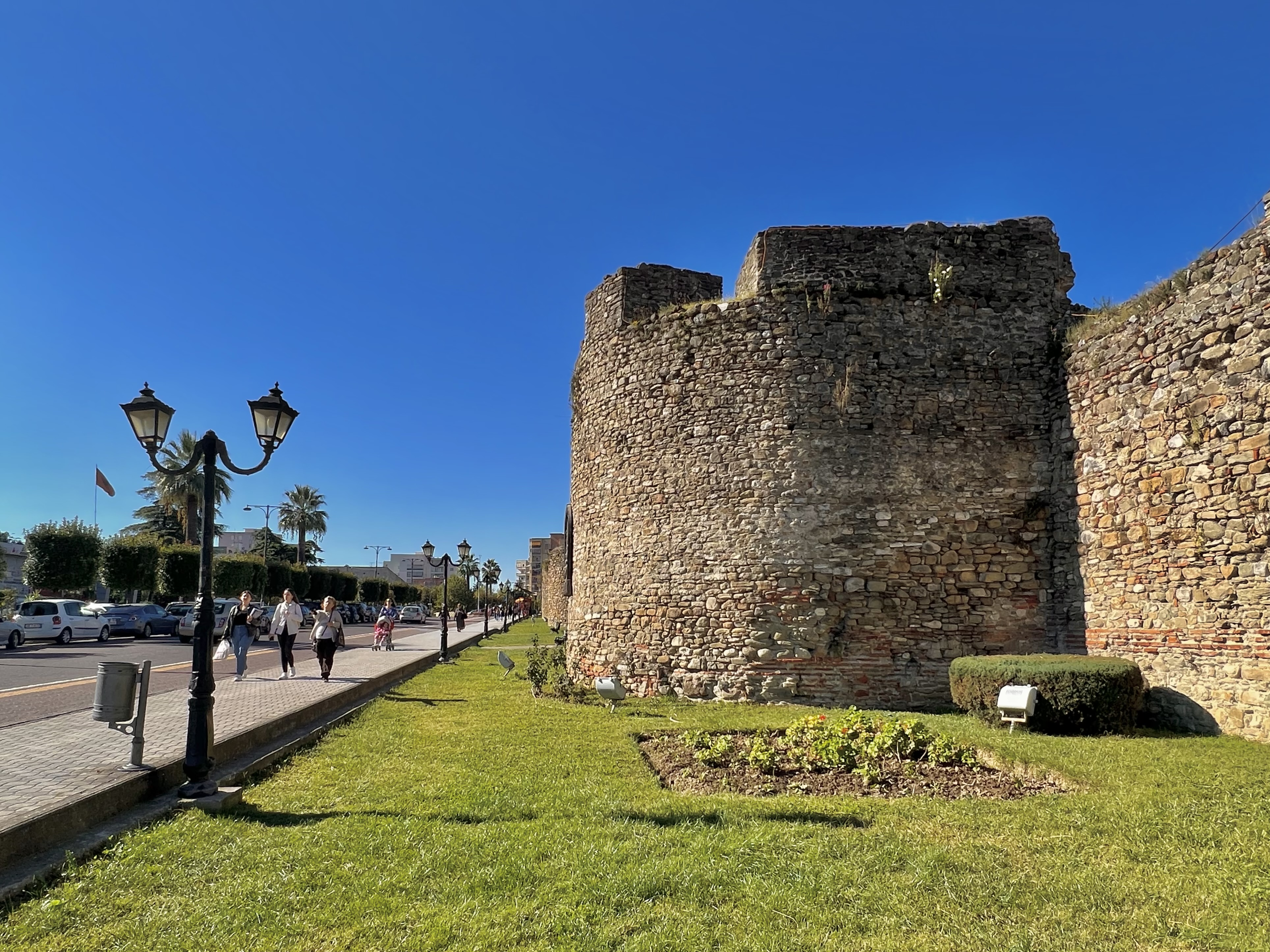
- St. Mary's Church Hafiz Patel Mosque Clock tower of Elbasan Elbasan Castle

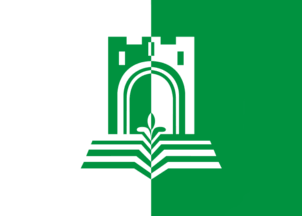
- Flag Emblem

- Location within Albania
- Coordinates: 41°06′40″N 20°04′50″E
- Country: Albania
- County: Elbasan

Government
  - Mayor: Gledian Llatja (PS)

Area
  - Municipality: 845.1 km^{2} (326.3 sq mi)
  - Administrative unit: 17.4 km^{2} (6.7 sq mi)
- Elevation: 133 m (436 ft)

Population (2023)
  - Municipality: 115,101
  - Municipality density: 136.2/km^{2} (352.8/sq mi)
  - Administrative unit: 66,834
  - Administrative unit density: 3,840/km^{2} (9,950/sq mi)
- Demonym(s): Albanian: Elbasanas (m), Elbasanase (f) or Elbasanlli (m) Elbasanllie (f)
- Time zone: UTC+1 (CET)
  - Summer (DST): UTC+2 (CEST)
- Postal Code: 3001-3006
- Area Code: (0)54
- Website: elbasani.gov.al

Elbasan (/ˌɛlbəˈsɑːn/ EL-bə-SAHN, Albanian: [ɛlbaˈsan]; Albanian definite form: Elbasani, pronounced [ɛlbaˈsani]) is the fourth most populous city of Albania and seat of Elbasan County and Elbasan Municipality. It lies to the north of the river Shkumbin between the Skanderbeg Mountains and the Myzeqe Plain in central Albania.

== Etymology ==
The name is derived from the Ottoman Turkish il-basan ("the fortress"). The city is also known as Elbasan in Aromanian.

== History ==
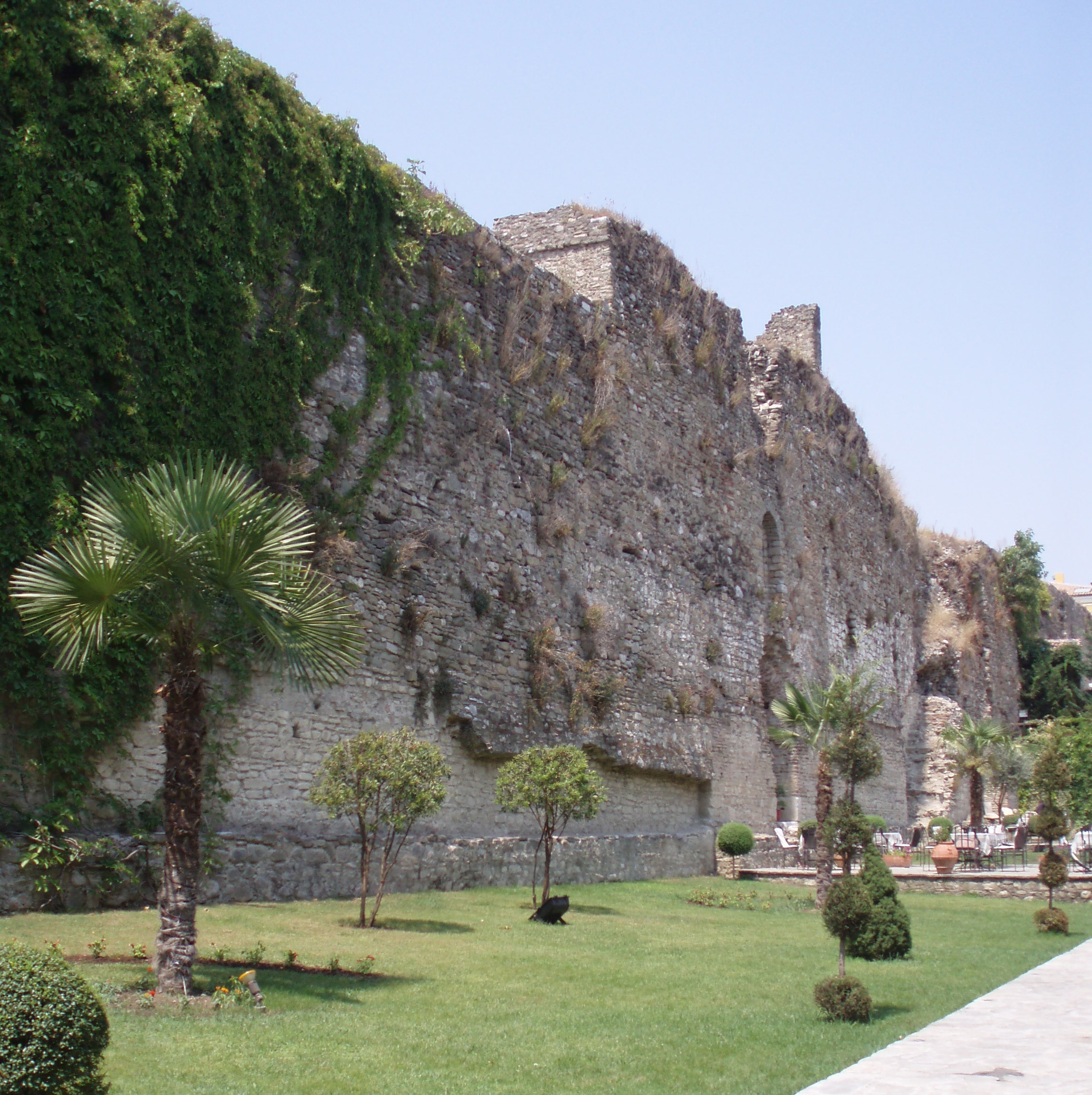
Elbasan Castle

In the second century BC, a Roman trading post recorded in Latin as Mansio Scampa near the site of modern Elbasan developed close to a junction of two branches of an important Roman road, the Via Egnatia, which connected the Adriatic coast with Byzantium and was one of the most important routes of the Roman Empire. By the third or fourth century AD, this place had grown into a city protected by a substantial Roman fortress with towers; the fort covered around 300 m^{2}. This city appears on late antique itineraries like the Tabula Peutingeriana and Itinerarium Burdigalense as Scampis or Hiscampis.

It took part in the spread of Christianity along the Via Egnatia, and had a bishop, cathedral and basilicas as early as the fifth century. The Roman-Byzantine quarter was located outside the walls of the ancient fortress of Scampis, including an early Christian basilica situated beyond the city's fortifications.

As a town in a wide river valley it was vulnerable to attacks once the legions were withdrawn but Emperor Justinian improved the fortifications. The city survived attacks by the Bulgars and Ostrogoths and was mentioned in the work of Procopius of Cæsarea.

=== Roman Remains ===
Ruins of a Paleochristian basilica, built in the 5th or 6th century AD, were also found in Bezistan area.

In August 2010 archaeologists discovered two Roman Era Illyrian graves near the walls of the castle of Elbasan.

In 2026 a well-preserved polychrome mosaic with a Christian scene, and an inscription were found in the Roman-Byzantine quarter of Scampis, belonging to an earlier phase of the basilica.

=== Later History ===
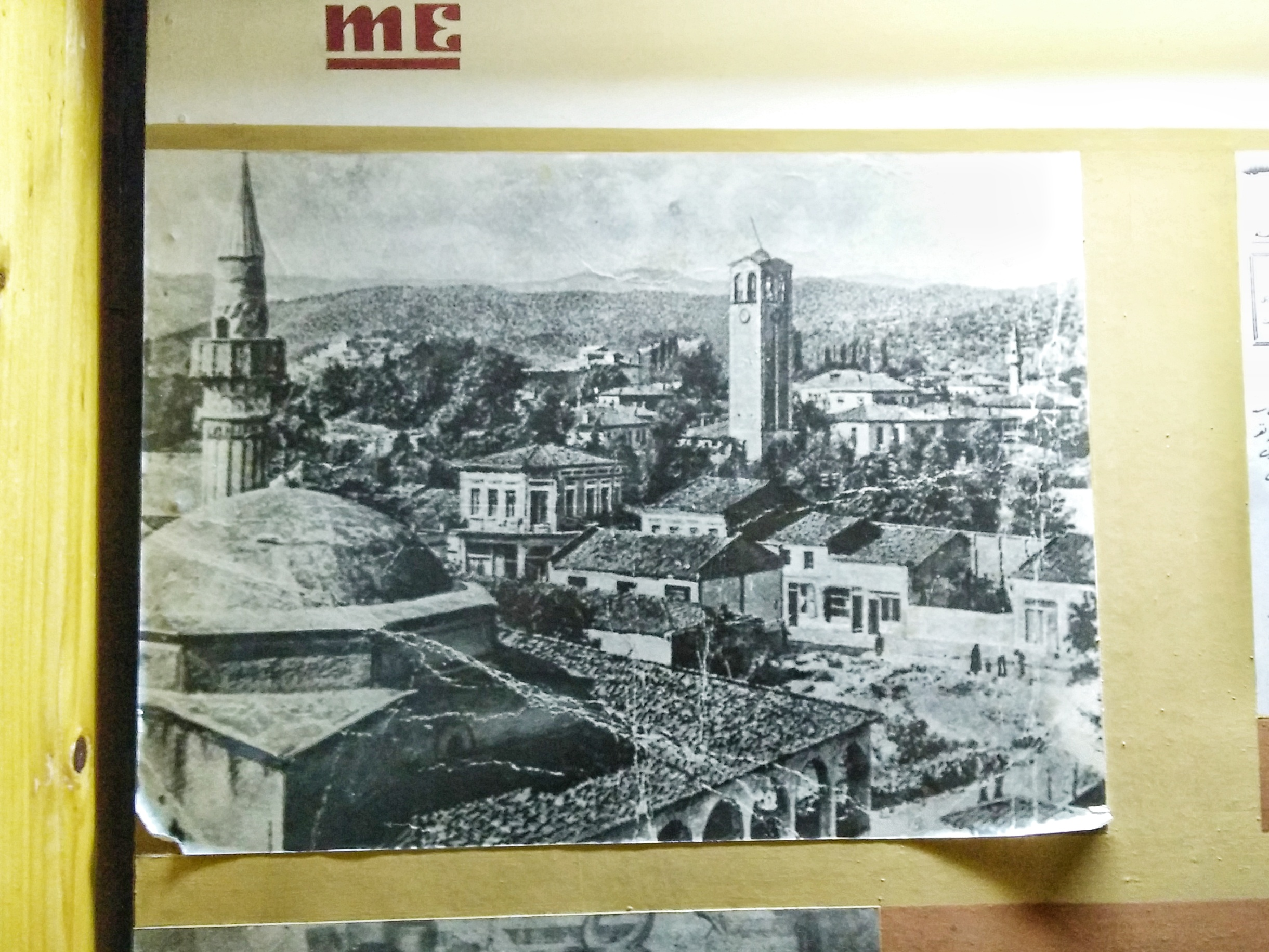
View of Elbasan with its famous and beautiful Ballie Mosque (left) which got destroyed in 1967 and is now replaced by a new modernist building

The site seems to have been abandoned until the Ottoman army built a military camp there, followed by urban reconstruction under Sultan Mehmed the Conqueror in 1466. Mehmet constructed a massive four-sided castle with a deep moat and three gates. The name Elbasan is thought to mean 'the flat fortress' in Albanian or 'the flat province' in Turkish. He had built the castle in order to fight Skanderbeg, due to an ongoing conflict between the Ottomans and Albanians.

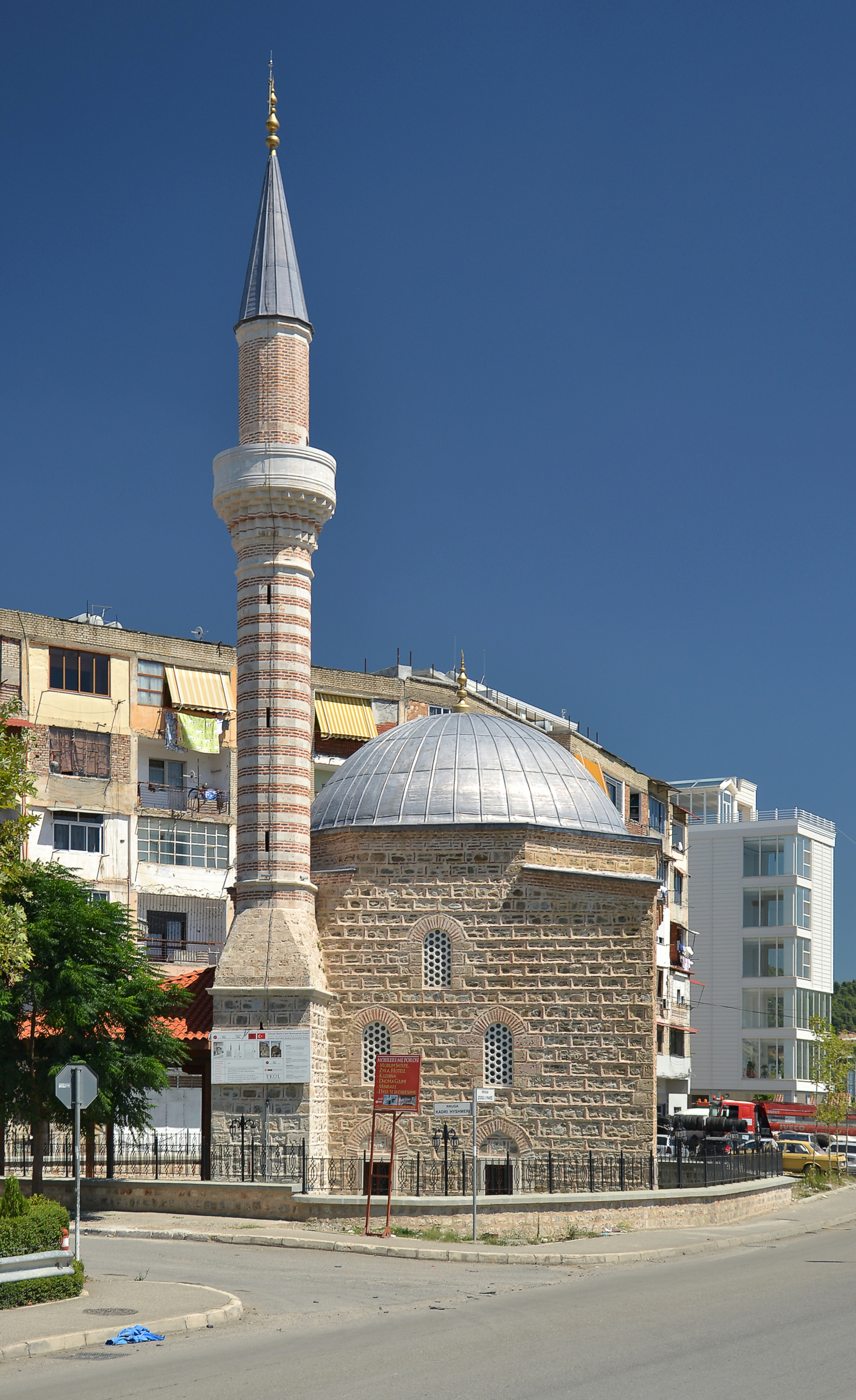
Naziresha Mosque from 1599

It became the seat of Sanjak of Elbasan, a centre of Ottoman urban civilisation over the next 445 years. Although Halil Inalcik explains that the Sanjak of Elbasan was established as soon as the fortress of Elbasan was constructed in 1466, based on Tursun Beg's records there is a possibility that Elbasan initially was part of the Sanjak of Ohrid. In 1467 many Christians from Skopje, Ohrid, Serres and Kastoria were forcibly deported to Elbasan. In the late 17th century, the Ottoman traveler Evliya Çelebi passed through Elbasan and noted that "all the inhabitants speak Albanian" having knowledge of Turkish with Muslim clergy being literate in Persian, while merchants also used the Greek and "Frankish" languages.

By the end of the 17th century, it had 2,000 inhabitants. The fortress was dismantled by Reshit Pasha in 1832.In 1864, the Sanjak of Elbasan became a part of Monastir Vilayet. In the late nineteenth century, Elbasan was inhabited by 3,000 Muslim families and 280 Orthodox Christian families, of which 100 were old Orthodox Albanian families living in the old Christian neighbourhood within the fortress and 180 Aromanian families residing in the St. Nicholas neighbourhood on the edge of town. At the beginning of the 20th century, it was estimated that 15,000 people lived in Elbasan.

In 1909, after the Young Turks revolution in Istanbul, an Albanian National Congress was held in Elbasan to study educational and cultural questions. The delegates, all from central and southern Albania, endorsed the decision of the Congress of Monastir, which was held in Monastir (modern Bitola, North Macedonia) to use the Latin alphabet rather than the Arabic script in written Albanian. Albanians, Turks, Aromanians and Sephardic Jews were living in Elbasan.

Before the Second World War, Elbasan was a city with a mixture of eastern and medieval buildings, narrow cobbled streets and a large bazaar. There was a clearly defined Muslim settlement within the castle walls, an Aromanian district on the outskirts of the city and several fine mosques and Islamic buildings. At the time the population was about 15,000 people.

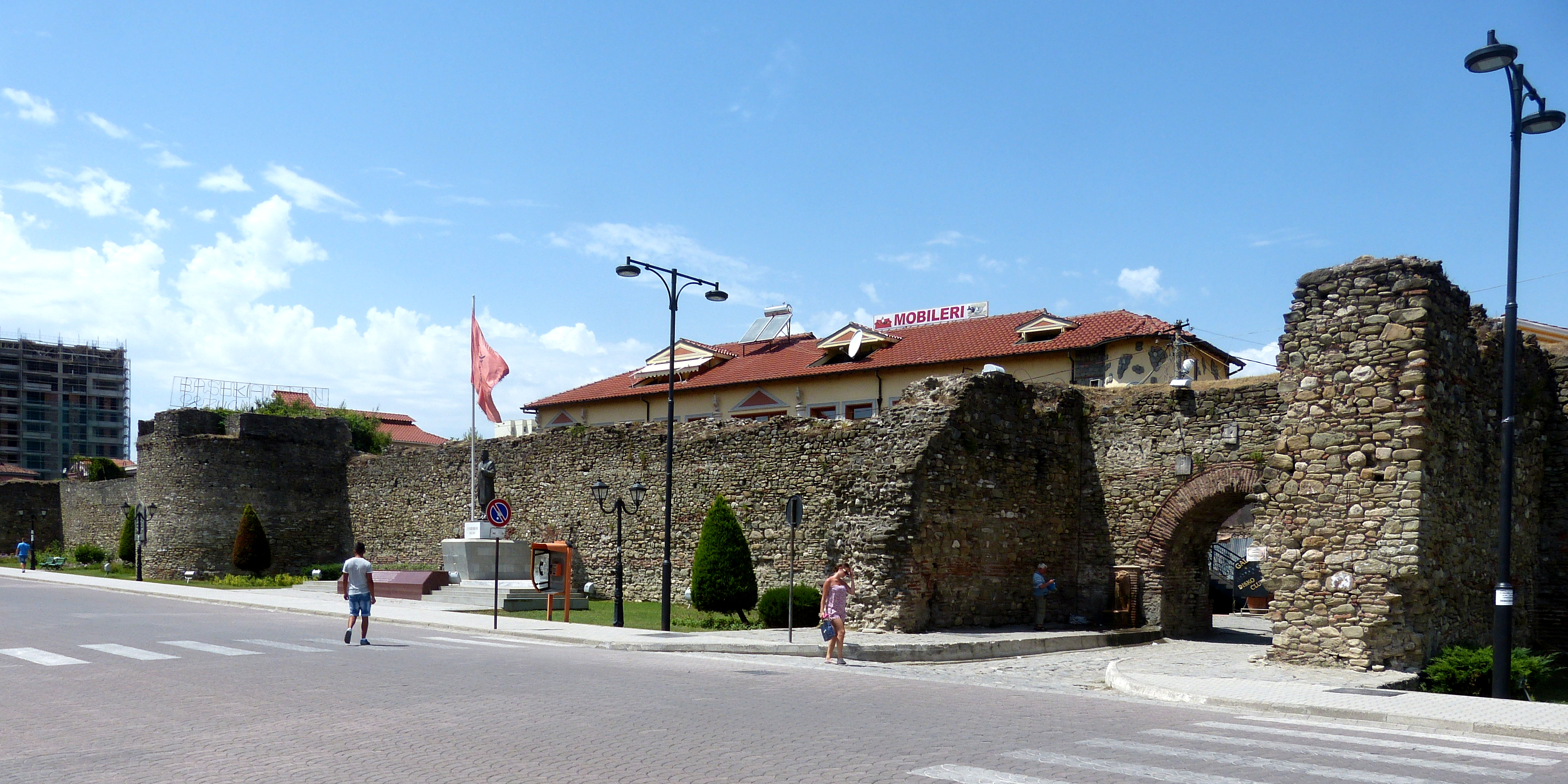
Elbasan Castle

The very first teachers' training college in Albania, the Shkolla Normale e Elbasanit, was established in Elbasan. During First Balkan War, it was occupied by Serbian troops on 29 November 1912. They withdrew from Elbasan on 25 October 1913 due to United Kingdom and Austria Hungary's ultimatum. The Muslim majority of Elbasan opposed the installation of Prince Wied in 1914. Elbasan was occupied successively by Serbs, Bulgarians, Austrians and Italians between 1915 and 1918. The Bulgarian army occupied Elbasan on January 29, 1916, during Bulgarian occupation of Albania In March 1916 the army of Austria-Hungary took over control of Elbasan. From June 1916 to March 1917 Stanislav Kostka Neumann fought with the Austrian army there and called his war memoirs about the occupation in Elbasan. Industrial development began in the Zogist period when tobacco and alcohol factories were established.

The city was also noted for its good public buildings, advanced educational provisions, public gardens and timber-built shops. There was much wartime damage, which was followed by an intensive programme of industrial development in the Communist period that boosted the city to around 75,000 inhabitants. The culmination of this process was the construction of the huge Steel of the Party (Albanian: Celiku i Partise) metallurgical complex outside the city, in the Shkumbini valley, built with Chinese assistance in the 1970s. It was emphatically called "The Second National Liberation of Albanian" by Enver Hoxha. The cost of the complex in environmental impact was high for the Shkumbin valley. Elbasan Railway Station was opened in 1950. In 2014, the Albanian government reconstructed former Ruzhdi Bizhuta Stadium. The renovated Elbasan Arena became the home stadium of the Albania national football team and Albania's de facto stadium meeting FIFA's criteria.

== Geography ==
The city of Elbasan lies to the north of the river Shkumbin between the Skanderbeg Mountains and the Myzeqe Plain in central Albania. The municipality of Elbasan consists of the administrative units of Bradashesh, Funarë, Gjergjan, Gjinar, Gracen, Labinot-Fushë, Labinot-Mal, Papër, Shirgjan, Shushicë, Tregan, Zavalinë and Elbasan. It covers 872.03 km^{2}.

=== Climate ===
According to the Köppen climate classification, Elbasan has a hot-summer Mediterranean climate (Csa) with an average annual temperature of 13.1 °C (55.6 °F).

Climate data for Elbasan
Month	Jan	Feb	Mar	Apr	May	Jun	Jul	Aug	Sep	Oct	Nov	Dec	Year
Mean daily maximum °C (°F)	9.5 (49.1)	11.1 (52.0)	14.1 (57.4)	18.0 (64.4)	22.7 (72.9)	27.1 (80.8)	29.6 (85.3)	29.6 (85.3)	25.9 (78.6)	20.3 (68.5)	14.9 (58.8)	10.9 (51.6)	19.5 (67.1)
Daily mean °C (°F)	5.9 (42.6)	7.1 (44.8)	9.7 (49.5)	13.2 (55.8)	17.6 (63.7)	21.6 (70.9)	23.7 (74.7)	23.7 (74.7)	20.3 (68.5)	15.6 (60.1)	11.1 (52.0)	7.4 (45.3)	14.7 (58.5)
Mean daily minimum °C (°F)	2.4 (36.3)	3.6 (38.5)	5.4 (41.7)	8.5 (47.3)	12.5 (54.5)	16.1 (61.0)	17.9 (64.2)	17.8 (64.0)	14.7 (58.5)	10.9 (51.6)	7.4 (45.3)	4.0 (39.2)	10.1 (50.2)
Average rainfall mm (inches)	120 (4.7)	110 (4.3)	98 (3.9)	86 (3.4)	75 (3.0)	50 (2.0)	32 (1.3)	41 (1.6)	66 (2.6)	104 (4.1)	156 (6.1)	145 (5.7)	1,083 (42.7)
Average snowfall cm (inches)	0.2 (0.1)	0.5 (0.2)	0.0 (0.0)	0.0 (0.0)	0.0 (0.0)	0.0 (0.0)	0.0 (0.0)	0.0 (0.0)	0.0 (0.0)	0.0 (0.0)	0.0 (0.0)	0.1 (0.0)	0.8 (0.3)
Average rainy days	13	12	13	13	10	8	5	6	7	9	13	14	123
Average snowy days	0.7	0.4	0	0	0	0	0	0	0	0	0	0.3	1.4
Average relative humidity (%)	74	72	69	69	66	64	58	60	66	70	76	76	68
Mean monthly sunshine hours	117.8	124.3	167.4	201	269.7	309	368.9	319.3	255	204.6	135	105.4	2,577.4
Mean daily sunshine hours	3.8	4.4	5.4	6.7	8.7	10.3	11.9	10.3	8.5	6.6	4.5	3.4	7.0
Mean daily daylight hours	9.6	10.7	12	13.3	14.5	15.1	14.8	13.8	12.5	11.1	9.9	9.3	12.2
Average ultraviolet index	3	4	6	8	9	10	10	9	8	6	4	2	7
Source: Climate data, Weather2Visit(Rain-Sun-Humidity), Weather Atlas(Daylight-Snow), Nomadseason(UV)

== Economy ==
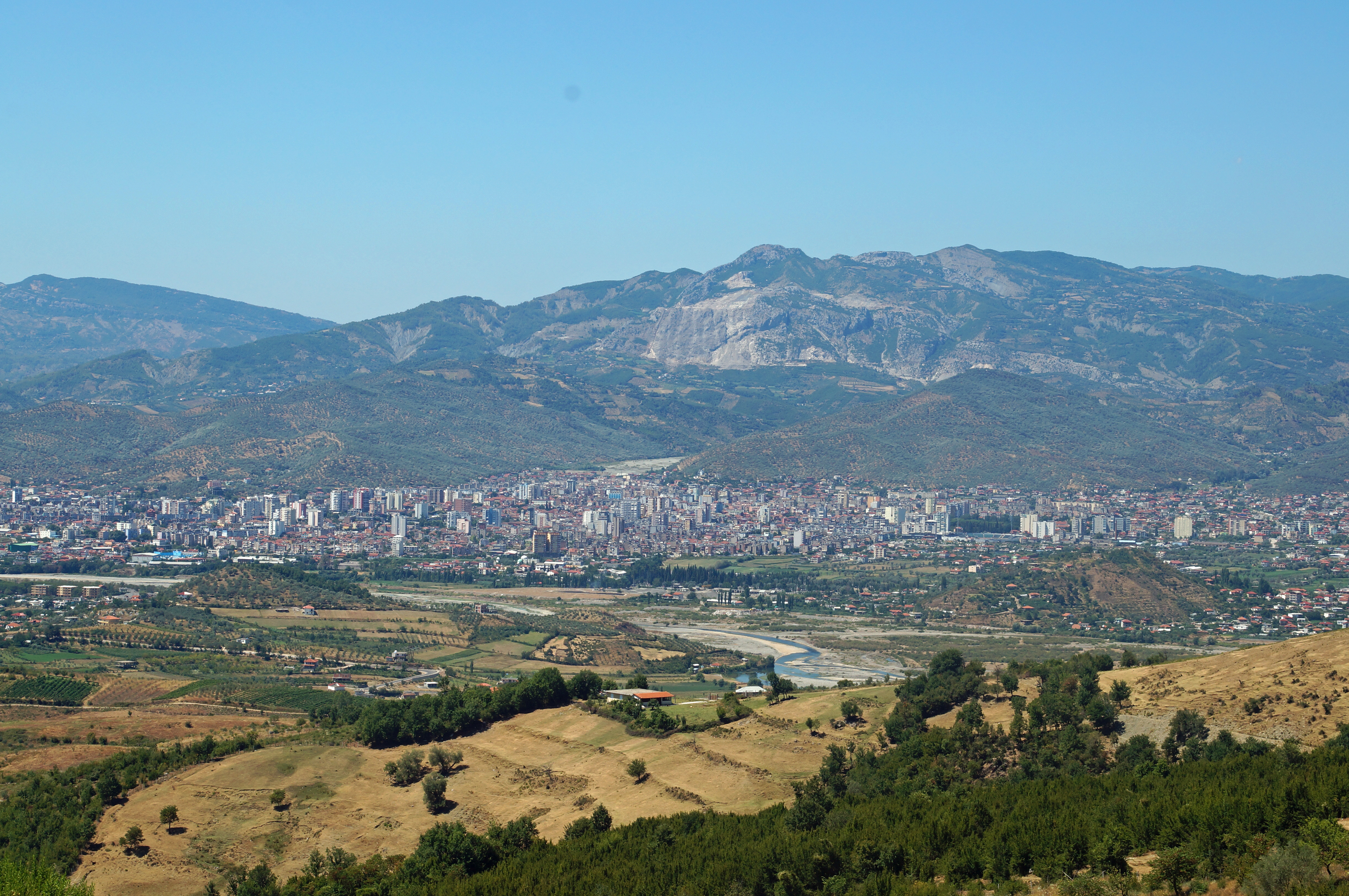
Elbasan from South

Industrial development began during the Zog regime with the production of tobacco and alcoholic beverages, and culminated during the communist regime. The city gained prominence after the Chinese built a steel mill in 1974. One travel writer relayed from conversation that during the communist regime, "almost everyone in the country seemed to have a gun, likely manufactured by this Chinese-financed factory in Elbasan," and the "country did not seem to have tractors, ploughs, or sewing machines."

The city also hosts a ferrochrome smelter, which was commissioned in 1989 by the communist regime and now is owned by the Balfin Group.

The city was a hub for heavy industry during the communist regime, mostly metallurgic and metal processing factories. All these industries caused big pollution and Elbasan is considered today to be one of the most polluted cities of Albania.

In recent years Elbasan, like the rest of Albania, has had to deal not only with local pollution, but also with what environmentalists call "imported pollution", because of the waste imported from abroad for the recycling process in private companies.

== Demographics ==
Historical population
Year	Pop.	±%
1950	16,492	—
1960	29,786	+80.6%
1969	39,100	+31.3%
1979	61,200	+56.5%
1989	80,650	+31.8%
2001	86,148	+6.8%
2011	78,703	−8.6%
2023	66,834	−15.1%

The population of the municipality of Elbasan as of the 2023 census is 115,101, of which 66,834 is in the municipal unit.

== Culture ==
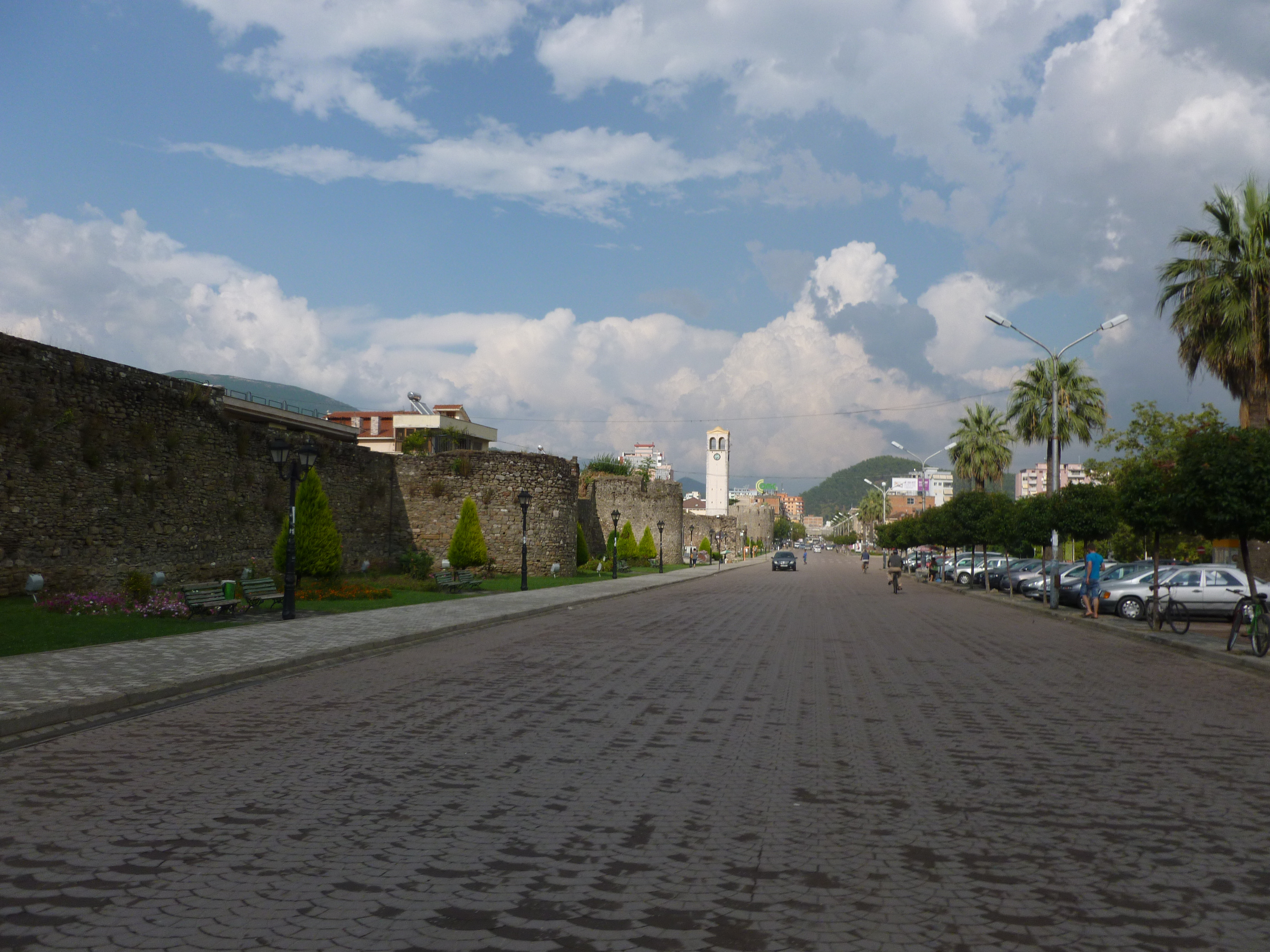
Main Boulevard in Elbasan

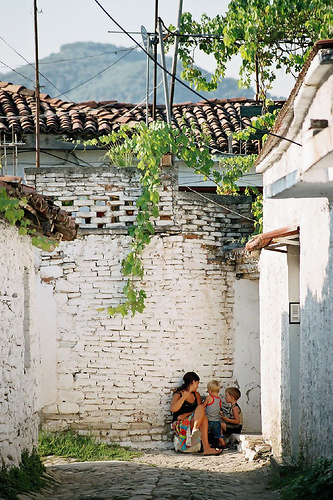
Traditional side street

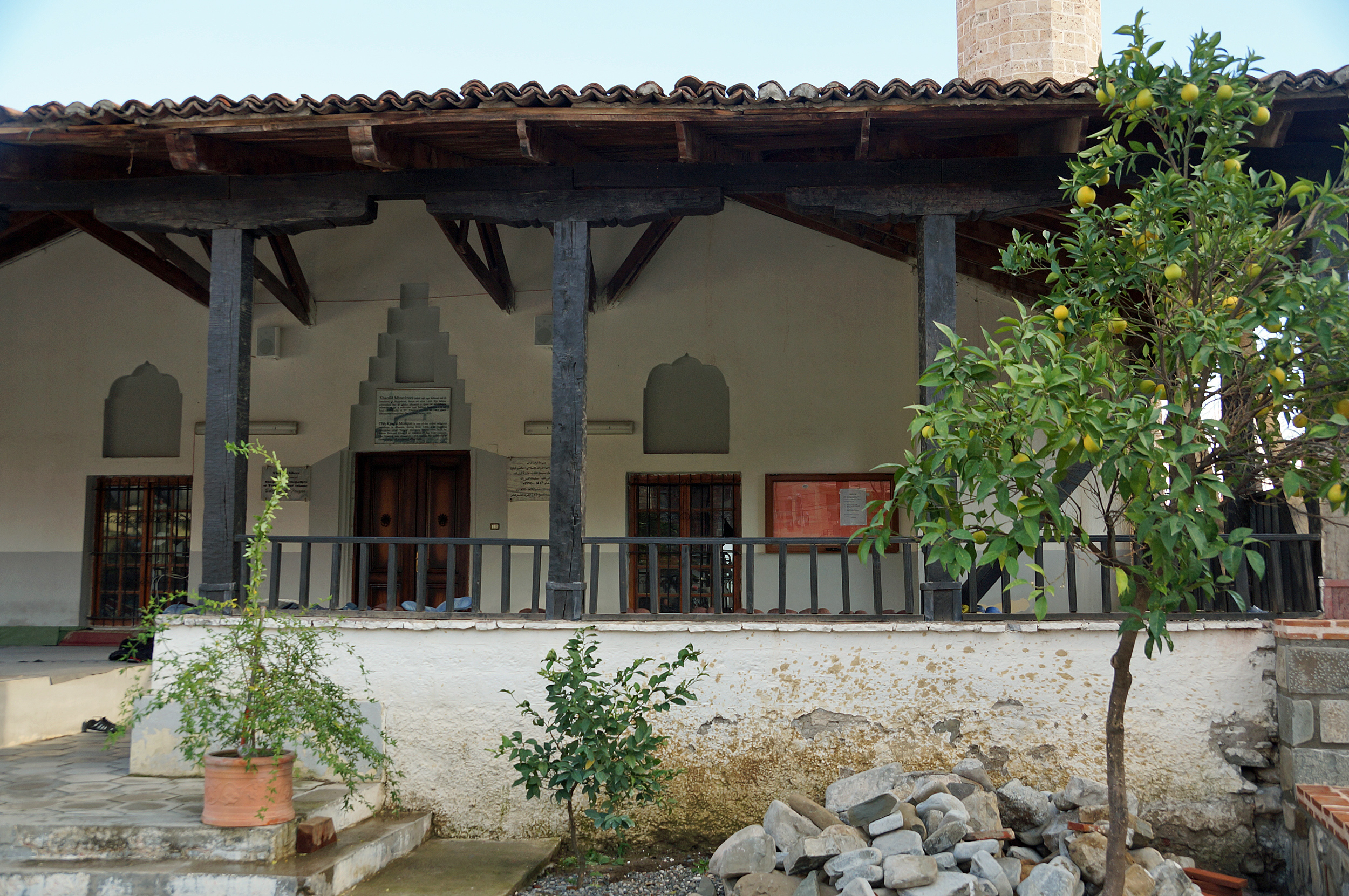
Portico and entrance in King Mosque

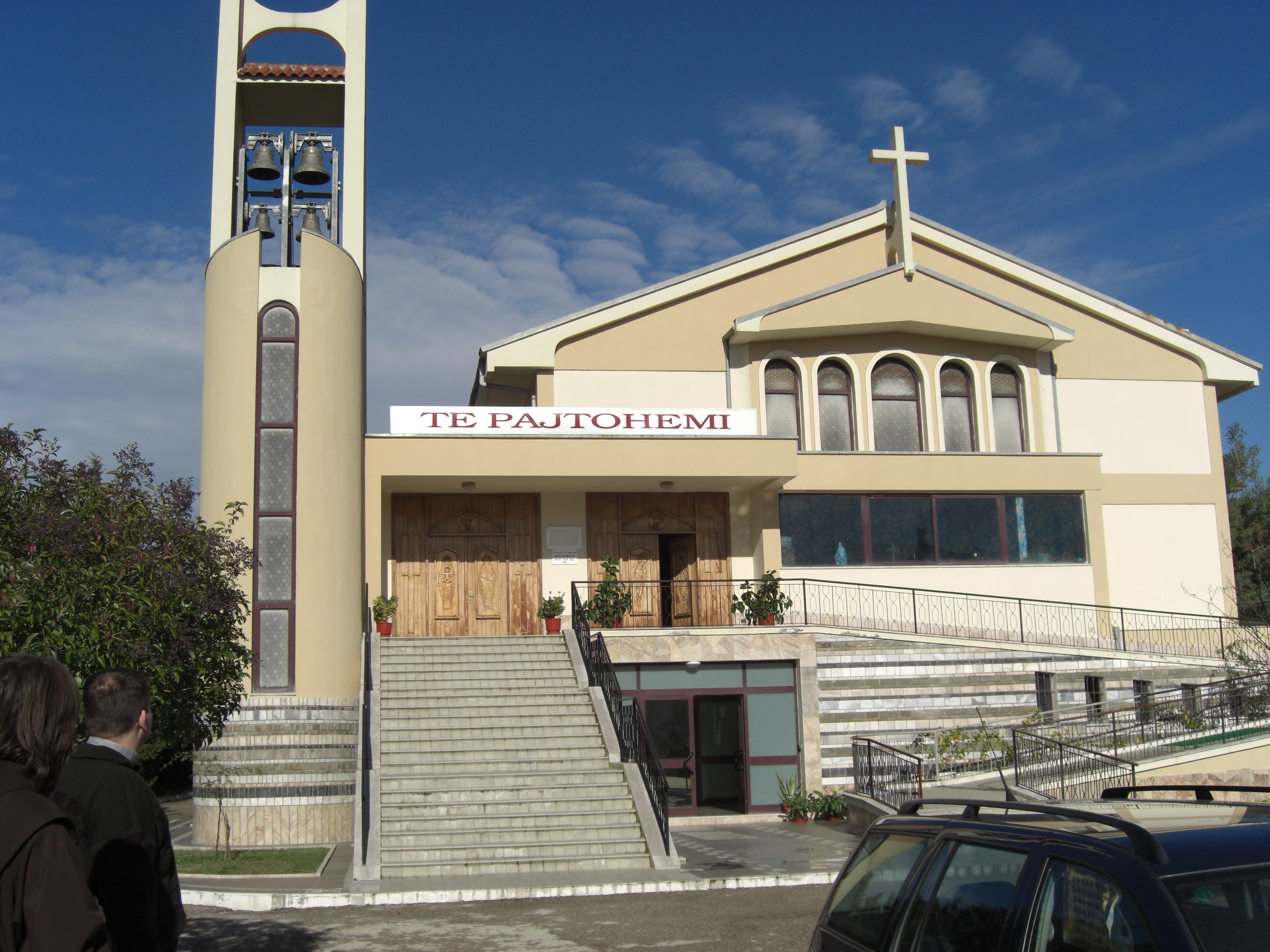
Catholic Church

Elbasan has been occupied by several different groups, including the Serbs, Bulgarians, Austrians and Italians. Elbasan remained a center of Christianity in Albania even after the Ottoman occupation. After the 1908 Congress of Monastir (in modern Bitola, North Macedonia) decided to use the Latin alphabet for the written Albanian language, Muslim clerics influenced by the Ottoman Empire held various demonstrations in favor of the Arabic script in Elbasan.

In the center of the city, is located the Saint Mary Orthodox Church. The church was built in 1830 on the foundations of an older church, which had partially burned in 1819. Paintings and frescoes of Onufri, restored by David Selenicasi and Kostadin Shelcani can still be seen. The church has been an important religious and cultural center for the Albanian language. Teodor Haxhifilipi, Kostandin Kristoforidhi, and Aleksandër Xhuvani have served in the church. They are the authors of translations into Albanian of many psalms. The church building served as the first Albanian school of Elbasan in modern times, which opened in 1909.

Other orthodox churches in the Elbasan District include the Mameli church (built in the 17th century), the Saint Nicholas church (Albanian: Shen Kolli) in Shelcan (built in 1554), the Saint Nicholas church in Valesh (built in 1604), the Saints Cosmas and Damian church in Sterstan (built in the 18th century), the Saint Michael (Albanian: Shen Mehilli) church in Shalës (built in the 17th century), the Saint Mary church in Dragot (built in the 18th century), the Saint Nicholas church of Elbasan (17th century), and the Elbasan Saint Athanasius church of Elbasan (built in 1554).

About 7 km away from Elbasan is the location of the orthodox St. Jovan Vladimir's Church (Albanian: Kisha e Shën Gjon Vlladimirit) built by Albanian monarch Karl Thopia and his son Gjergj Thopia in 1381. Notably, Saint Jovan Vladimir was buried at the church until 1995 when his remains were transferred to the Orthodox Cathedral in Tirana, being brought back to the monastery only for his feast days.

Elbasan is home to the National Autocephalous Albanian Church (Albanian: Kisha Autoqefale Kombetare), a relatively new Orthodox Autocephalous church that split from the Albanian Orthodox Church in 1995. Father Nikolle Marku is the leader of the new denomination.

Elbasan is also home to a Catholic church.

Elbasan has four museums:

- Ethnographic Museum (1982) held in an 18th-century building
- "Kostandin Kristoforidhi" house (started as a museum in 1978)
- Shkolla Normale Museum
- War Museum

Elbasan is home to the Summer Day festivities, a pagan feast celebrating the end of winter and the coming of summer. Ballokume, a kind of cookie made with butter and cornmeal among other ingredients, is the traditional dessert served on this day. Since 2004, it has become a national holiday being celebrated nationwide, in all Albania.

== Notable people ==
- Flutura Açka – Albanian poet, publisher and politician.
- Sedefkar Mehmed Agha – or Sedefqar Mehmeti of Elbasan, architect of the Sultan Ahmed Mosque (the "Blue Mosque") in Istanbul.
- Kristjan Asllani - Albanian professional footballer who plays as a midfielder for Beşiktaş J.K. in the Süper Lig, on loan from Inter Milan, and the Albania national football team.
- Shefqet Vërlaci – Albanian politician.
- Ibrahim Biçakçiu – Albanian landowner, Axis collaborator and Prime Minister of Albania
- Aqif Pasha Elbasani – Albanian political figure
- Lef Nosi – Albanian politician, scholar and patriot
- Theodhor Haxhifilipi – Albanian scholar, inventor of the Todhri script.
- Teki Biçoku – Albanian geologist and former member and president of the Academy of Sciences of Albania.
- Qemal Karaosmani – He served as General Secretary of the Provisional Government of Albania
- Thoma Deliana – Albanian politician of Communist Albania
- Sokrat Dodbiba – Albanian economist and politician who served as Minister of Finance of Albania during 1943–44
- Pirro Dodbiba – Albanian politician of the Albanian Party of Labour (PPSh).
- Shefqet Daiu – Signatories of the Albanian Declaration of Independence
- Mahir Domi – Albanian linguist, professor, and academic
- Shefqet Stringa – Banking pioneer in Albania
- Abdullah Pashe Taushani – Member of the Ali Pasha Tepelena's Supreme Council of the Armed Forces
- Eva Murati – Albanian actress and TV host
- Astrit Çerma — Film and Theatre Actor
- Trejsi Sejdini – Miss Universe Albania
- Lindita Idrizi – Albanian model
- Saimir Pirgu – Albanian international opera singer
- Miriam Cani – Albanian singer-songwriter and television host
- Armando Sadiku – Albanian professional footballer who plays as a forward for Levante in La Liga and the Albania national team
- Elton Basriu – Albanian professional footballer
- Kostandin Kristoforidhi – Albanian translator and scholar
- Fatos Kongoli – Recently become one of the most forceful and convincing representatives of contemporary Albanian prose
- Klara Buda – Albanian journalist and writer
- Luljeta Lleshanaku – Albanian poet
- Dhimitër Shuteriqi – Albanian scholar, literary historian, and writer.
- Iliriana Sulkuqi – Award-winning Albanian poet and journalist
- Visarion Xhuvani – Primate of the Orthodox Autocephalous Church of Albania from 1929 to 1937
- Ardit Hila— Albanian footballer who currently plays for KF Tirana
- Mirketa Çobani- former Albanian actress

== International relations ==
Elbasan is twinned with:

- Dunaújváros, Hungary
- Osijek, Croatia

Elbasan also has cooperation and friendship relationships with:

- Bar, Montenegro
- Liège, Belgium

== See also ==
- List of mayors of Elbasan
