= Naziresha Mosque =

Mosque in Elbasan, Albania

- Xhamia e Nazireshës
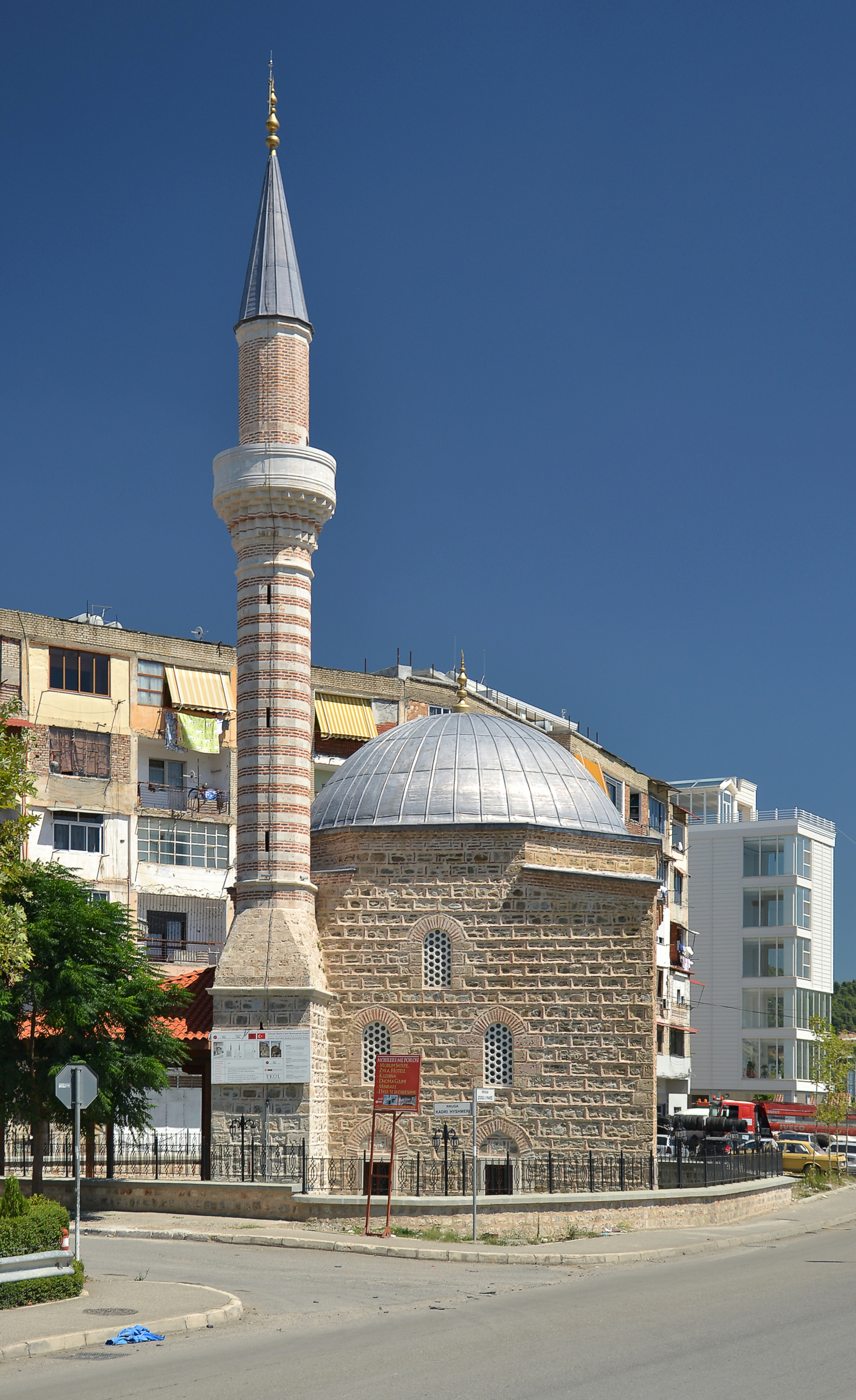
- The mosque after its renovation with an altered and leveled cupola in 2014

- Location of the mosque in Albania

Religion
- Affiliation: Islam
- Ecclesiastical or organizational status: Mosque
- Status: Active

Location
- Location: Elbasan, Elbasan County
- Country: Albania
- Interactive map of Naziresha Mosque
- Coordinates: 41°06′19″N 20°05′11″E

Architecture
- Type: Islamic architecture
- Style: Ottoman
- Established: 1599 CE

Specifications
- Interior area: 10.7 m^{2} (115 sq ft)
- Dome: 1
- Dome height (outer): 14 m (46 ft)
- Minaret: 1
- Materials: Lead; stone; brick; masonry

Cultural Monument of Albania
- Official name: Naziresha Mosque
- Designated: 1948
- Reference no.: EL083

The Naziresha Mosque (Albanian: Xhamia e Nazireshës, lit. 'Masjid Naziresha') is a mosque from 1599 located in Elbasan, in Elbasan County, central Albania.

== History ==
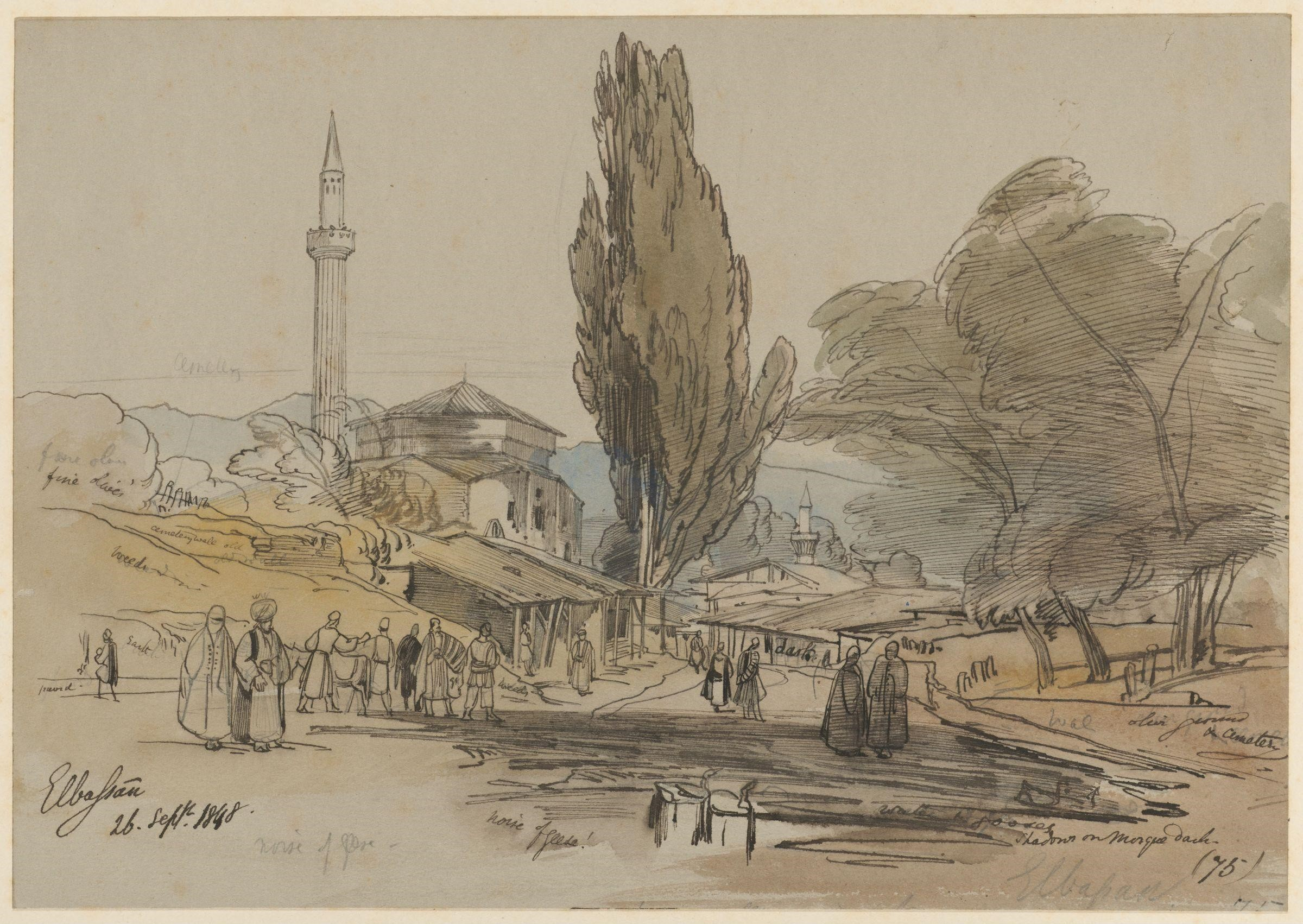
Either the Nazire Mosque or the Aga Mosque (left) with its original red-tile roof in 1848

The mosque was built in 1599 CE by a Naziresha (Nazire), the daughter of a Nazır (minister). The mosque was designated as a Cultural Monument of Albania in 1948. After being partly damaged in 1920 due to an earthquake (its minaret balcony and part of its typical Albanian roof were destroyed), the mosque was renovated in 2012, and the traditional and more higher, original high red-tile roof, that was standing for several hundreds of years, was replaced by a classical lead dome.

== Architectural overview ==
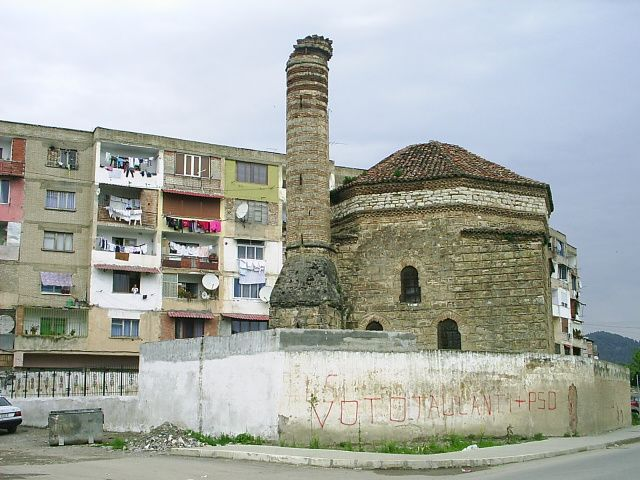
The mosque in 2006 with its higher roof before its renovation

The Nazireshas Mosque has a relatively small 10.70-square-metre (115.2 sq ft) plan and one cubic-shaped central hall of 8.7 metres (29 ft). It was built in late-Classical Ottoman style. The main load bearing system consists of 1-metre-thick (3.3 ft) stone walls and the main dome. Transition from the cube to the dome is provided by pendentives covered from outside by triangular shoulders.

The 14-metre-high (46 ft) dome rises over pendentives and was made of brick masonry, covered with roof tiles; until the 2012 renovation. Masonry walls are made of rectangular cloisonné; neatly cut rectangular blocks formed with two layers of two horizontally- and two layers of vertically-placed bricks. The windows at three floors are adorned with rectangular frames and crowned with a pointed arch with an adorned border, at the first level only. At the other levels, the windows have the same characteristics, but are smaller in size and fewer in number.

Even though the mosque is relatively small in size, it is tall and monumental as it follows the concepts of the late-Classical theories of proportion and volume. The pendentives are adorned with stalactite works. The interior of the mosque was painted pale green and white. The minaret, located at the west corner, was damaged and the upper section was missing prior to its 2012 renovation.

== See also ==
- Islam in Albania
- List of mosques in Albania
