= Omer Pashë Kavaja =

Albanian military ruler

Omer Pashë Kavaja (Alltuni) (born in Kavajë) was an Albanian administrative ruler who served as Wāli of Iskodra from 1755 to 1757 and as Sanjak-bey of Elbasan and Avlona from 1756 to 1768.
