= Lef Nosi =

Albanian politician and scholar

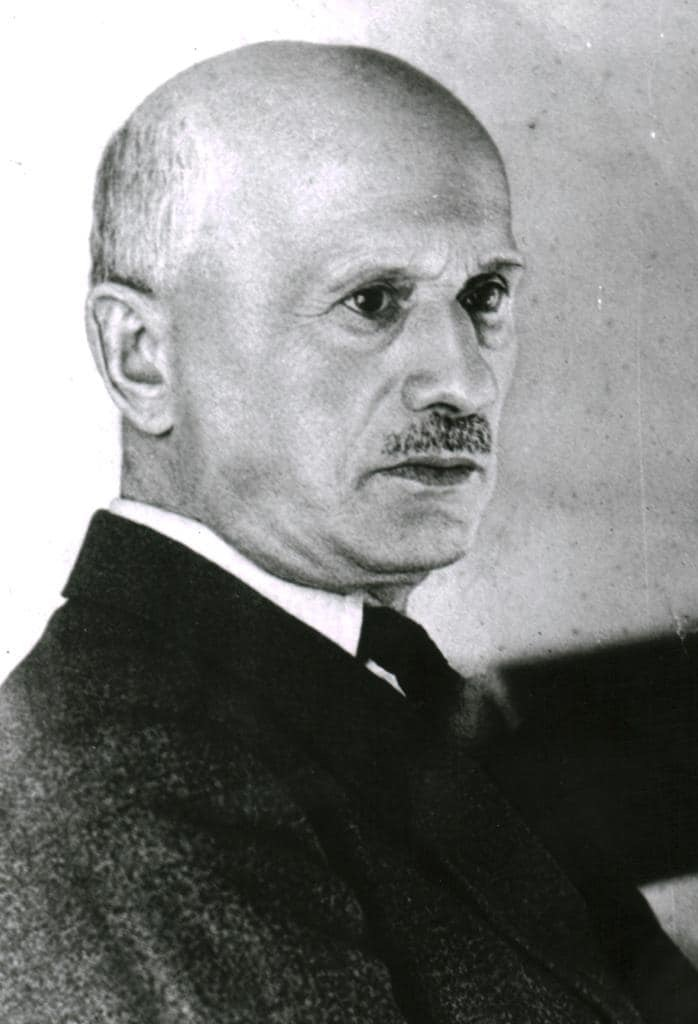

Minister of Post-Telegraphs
- In office 4 December 1912 – 21 February 1914

Minister of Economy and Social Relations
- In office 1918–1919

Member of the High Regency Council of the Albanian Kingdom (1943–44)
- In office 16 October 1943 – 28 November 1944

Personal details
- Born: Elefter Nosi; 9 April 1877 Elbasan, Manastir Eyalet, Ottoman Empire (modern day Albania)
- Died: 20 February 1946 (aged 68) Tirana, People's Republic of Albania
- Cause of death: Execution by firing squad
- Party: Balli Kombëtar
- Relations: Polikseni Nosi (sister), Vasil Nosi (nephew), Sokrat Dodbiba, (nephew), Jani Dodbiba (nephew)

Lef Nosi (born Elefter Nosi; 9 April 1877 – 20 February 1946) was an Albanian publisher, archivist, philologist, folklorist, ethnographer, numismatist, archaeologist and politician. On 28 November 1912, he was as one of the signatories of the Declaration of Independence, representing Elbasan. During the Second World War, Nosi was a leading member of Balli Kombëtar and was chosen as a member of the Albanian High Council.

== Biography ==
=== Early life ===
Lef Nosi was born on 9 April 1877, and was a committee member of the Albanian club in Elbasan. During the Albanian revolt of 1912 Nosi was one of two delegates representing Elbasan sent to Kosovo that partook in negotiations between Albanian rebels and the Ottoman state regarding Albanian sociopolitical and cultural interests.

=== Arrest and death ===
Lef Nosi was brought to trial in February 1946, led by general judge Irakli Bozo and prosecuted by Misto Treska. Along with Anton Harapi and former prime minister Maliq bey Bushati, Nosi was condemned to death by communist Albania.
