= Elbasan Castle =

- Kalaja e Elbasanit
- Elbasan, Albania
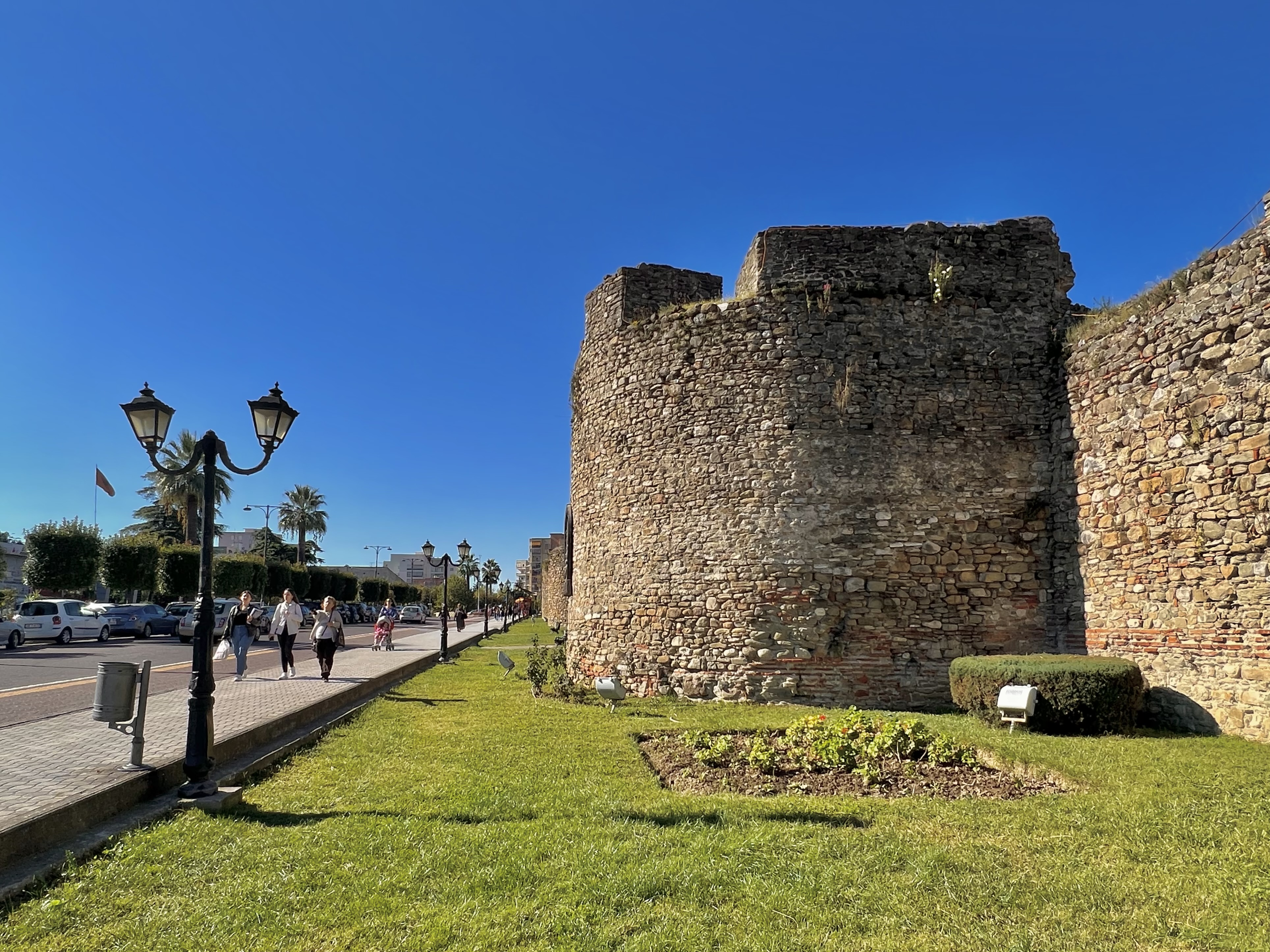
- Elbasan Castle

Site information
- Type: Castle
- Owner: Albania
- Controlled by: Ottoman Empire; Albania
- Open to the public: Yes

Location
- Location within Albania
- Coordinates: 41.113°N 20.080°E

Site history
- Built: 4th century

Elbasan Castle (Albanian: Kalaja e Elbasanit) is a 15th-century fortress from Ottoman Turkish times in the city of Elbasan, Albania.

== History ==
A previous fortification was built during the 4th century, theorized after the Gothic invasions of Illyria in 378 AD. It was initially composed of three meter thick walls in a rectangular shape (c. 348 by 308m). The surrounding region showed evidence of considerable agricultural activity during the Roman period. A second period of settlement is noticed up until the 6th century, the decline of which corresponds with the Slavic invasions.

The Elbasan Castle was restored under orders of Mehmed II of the Ottoman Empire. Due to the short time it took to be completed, it is noted that the restoration made use of the pre-existing fortification considerably. It consisted of 26 equidistant 9-metre (30 ft) high towers, and part of Via Egnatia passes through the castle.

Sinan Pasha's hamam (Turkish bathhouse) is within the walls of the castle. It is a well-preserved attraction built in the early 19th century.

== Gallery ==
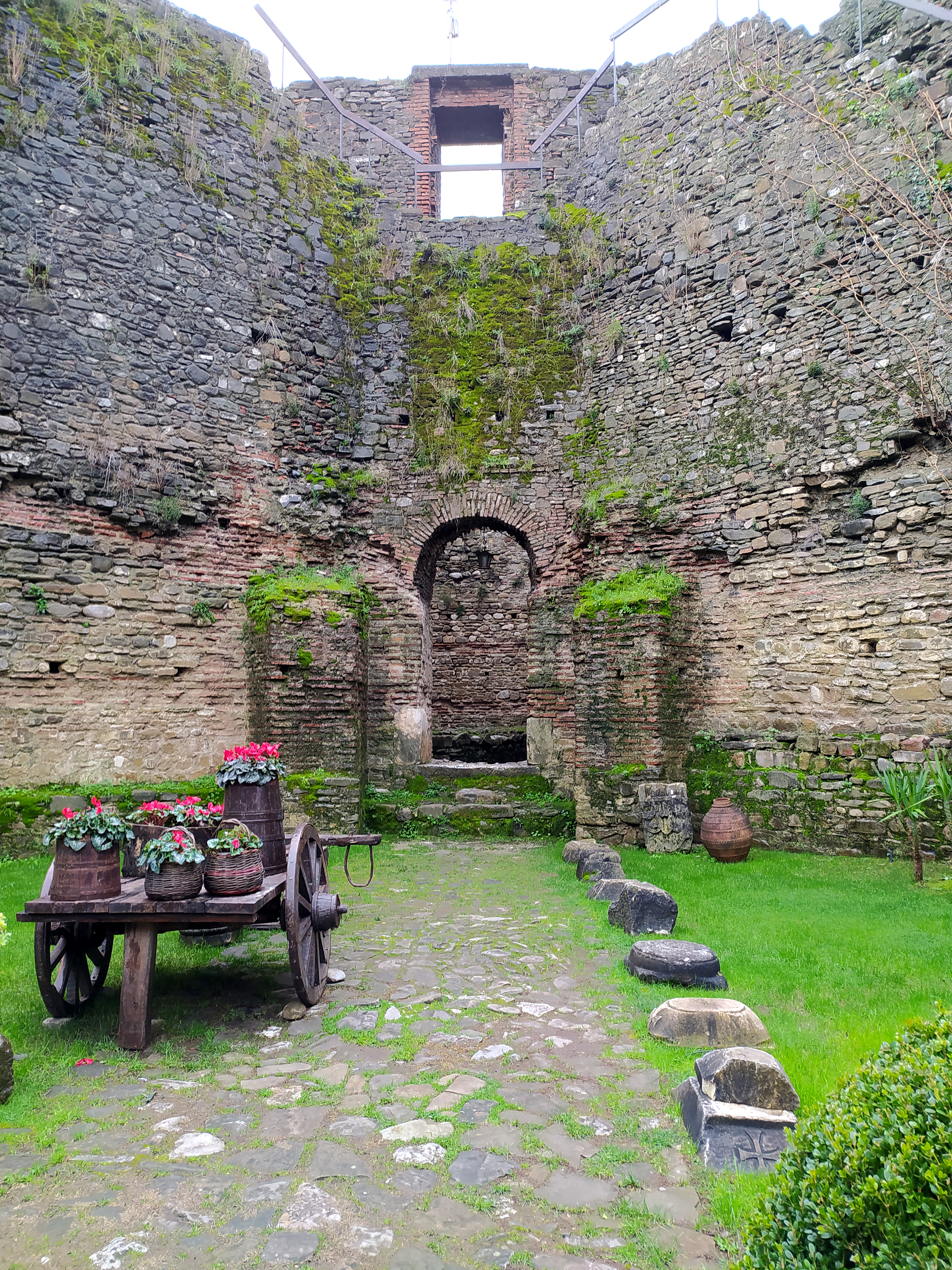
Inside of the Castle.

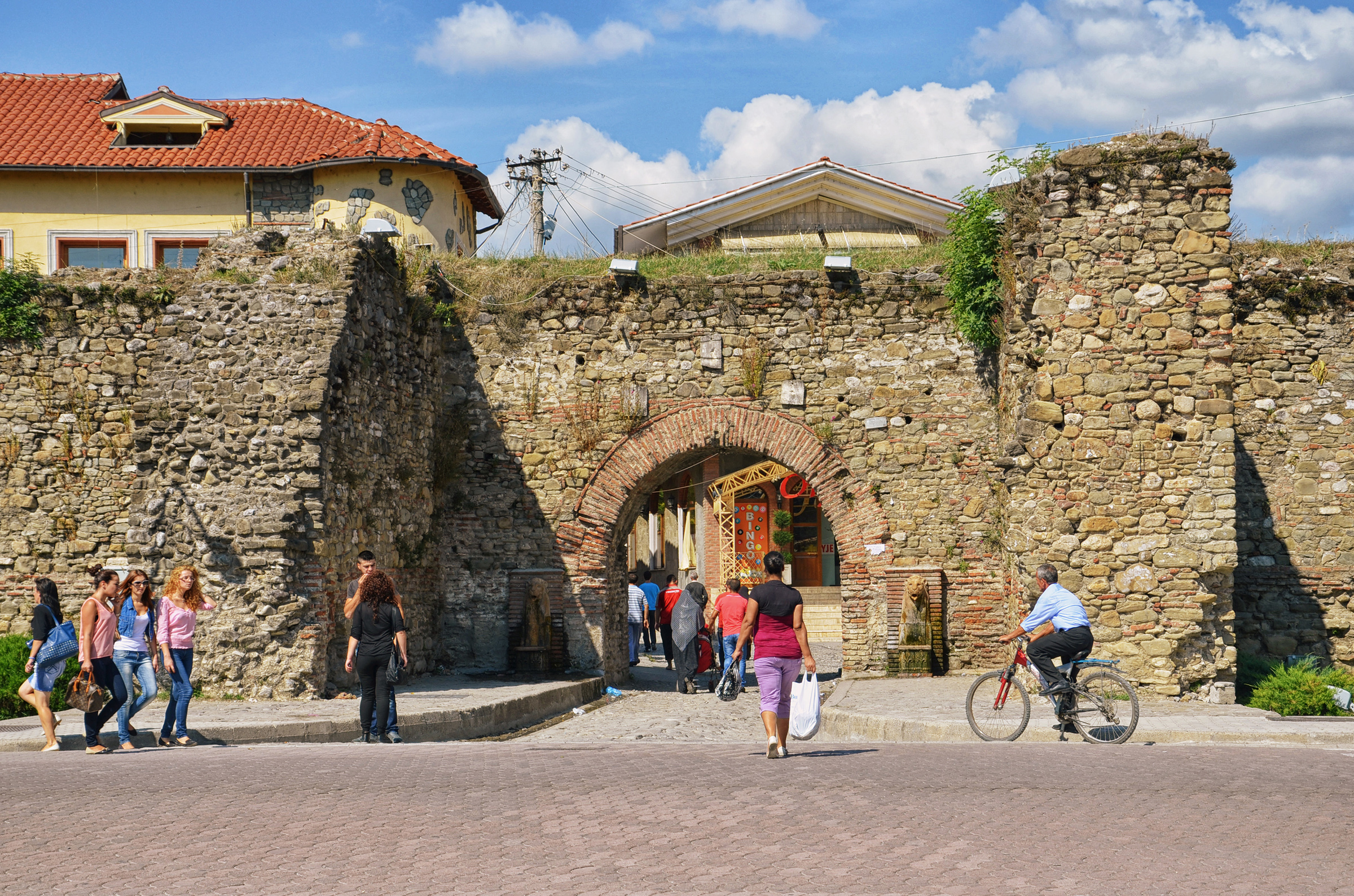
The southern gate of the Elbasan Castle with the Two Lion Fountains.

== See also ==
- Elbasan
- List of castles in Albania
- Tourism in Albania

== Bibliography ==
- Winnifrith, Tom (1992). Perspectives On Albania. Springer. ISBN 978-1-349-22050-2.
