= Menduh =

Menduh is a masculine given name. Notable people with the name include:

- Menduh Thaçi, Macedonian politician
- Menduh Zavalani, Albanian revolutionary
