= Mihal Grameno =

Albanian nationalist (1871–1931)

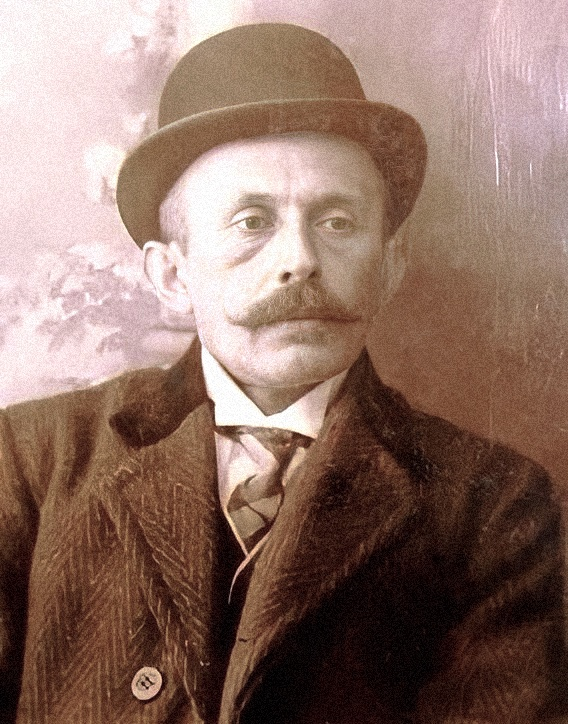
- Mihal Grameno, 1920s
- Born: 13 January 1871; Korçë, Vilayet of Monastir, Ottoman Empire (modern Albania)
- Died: 5 February 1931 (aged 60); Korçë, Kingdom of Albania
- Writing career
- Notable awards: Hero of the People
- Movements: Romanticism, Albanian National Awakening

Mihal Grameno (13 January 1871 – 5 February 1931) was an Albanian nationalist, politician, writer, freedom fighter, and journalist. He was one of the four initial appointed delegates from Korçë to the Albanian National Congress that proclaimed the Independence of Albania on 28 November 1912.

== Biography ==
=== Early life and education ===
Mihal Grameno was born on 13 January 1871 in Korçë to an Orthodox Christian Albanian merchant family. He studied at the local secondary school before emigrating to Romania in 1885. It was in Bucharest where he got involved in the Albanian National Awakening where the movement soon collapsed due to financial reasons in the extended family who were dependent on money.

=== Uprising against the Ottomans ===
In 1907, he joined the newly formed Çerçiz Topulli's kachak band, an early guerrilla unit fighting against Ottoman troops (mostly Albanian) and policies of Sultan Abdul Hamid II in Albania. They were considered the Apostles of Albanianism and would go from village to village to discuss the Albanian predicament.

Ottoman officials sent out military patrols to capture the bandits. The activity of the band consisted of only one battle in two years, when the 5 people band was surrounded by 150 Ottoman units in Mashkullore. Four out of five escaped the encirclement by defeating Ottoman troops. Other bands of this nature, not having a journalist in their company, such as Grameno have remained unsung heroes.

During the Young Turk Revolution (1908), the Albanian Adjutant Major Ahmed Niyazi Bey met with guerrilla leaders Topulli and Grameno on 23 July in Resne (modern Resen) where he expressed his gratitude and viewed the declaration of the CUP constitution as advantageous for the Albanian nation. Grameno alongside Topulli and Niyazi appeared in photographs taken by the Manakis brothers during the revolution.

=== Political and Literary career ===
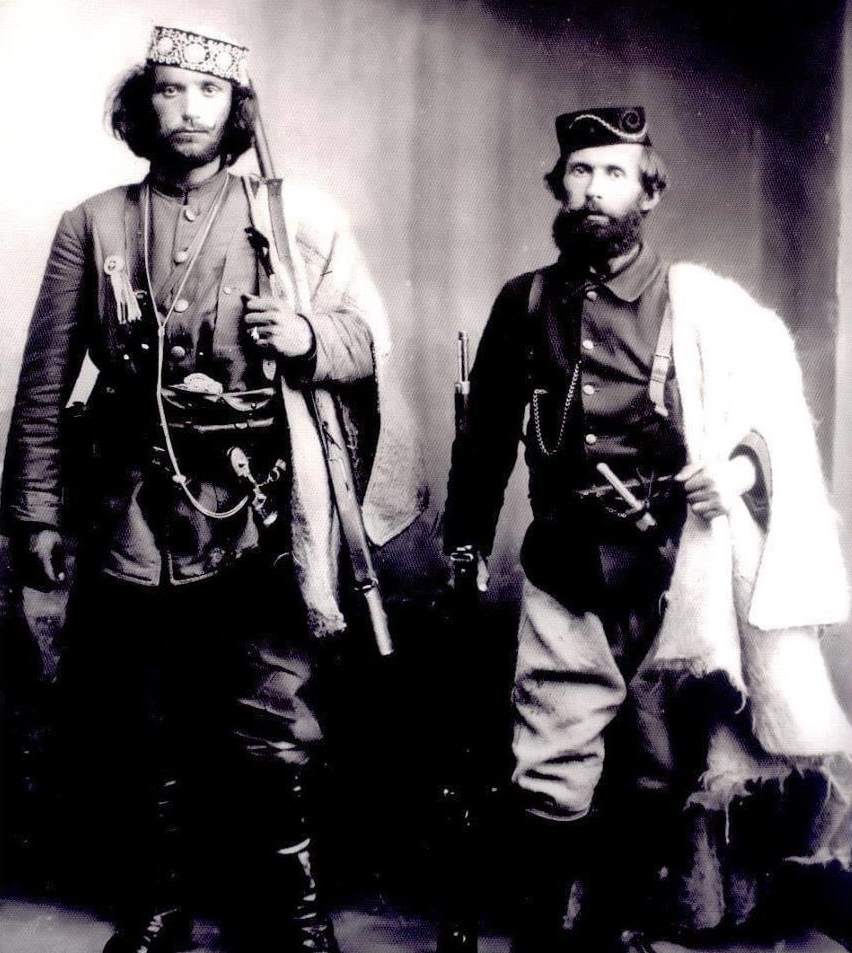
Çerçiz Topulli And Mihal Grameno in 1908 or 1909

In 1909 Grameno founded in Korçë the Orthodox League (or Alliance) (Albanian: Lidhja Ortodokse) and served as editor of its periodical with the same name during 1909–1910. In 1910 the organization proclaimed the establishment of an independent Albanian church, and was unrecognized by the Ottoman Empire and Patriarchate of Constantinople. Grameno was arrested in 1910 by Ottoman authorities for his work with the newspaper Bashkimi i Kombit.

During the upheavals of 1911, Grameno traveled as a go between for Albanian revolutionaries in Albanian inhabited lands and leaders of the Albanian national movement in Istanbul to coordinate armed activities against the Ottoman Empire and secure a separation of Albanian lands from the Ottoman state.

Mihal Grameno was one of the four initial appointed delegates from Korçë to the Albanian National Congress that proclaimed the Independence of Albania on 28 November 1912. While the Ottoman Empire had allowed Ismail Qemali to go in Vlora and proceed with his political activities, the Ottoman officials in Korce had created a communication blockade, by preventing the telegram messages from being sent in and out of town. Grameno and his compatriots Menduh Zavalani, Stavro Karoli and Estref Vërleni learned later about the Independence Congress and reached Vlorë after five days, while they were substituted during the first day of the Congress by Pandeli Cale, Thanas Floqi and Spiridon Ilo.

=== Later life and death ===
After independence, Grameno served as the editor of the weekly Koha (Time), initially published in Korçë and later in Jamestown, New York, where he lived from 1915 to 1919. He traveled back to Europe to represent Albania through the Albanian-American community at the Paris Peace Conference in 1919 and in the following year he returned in Albania.

In the 1920s he carried out his journalistic and literary activities until he retired from public life due to ill health. Resigned and seriously ill, he died on 5 February 1931 in Korçë.

== Works ==
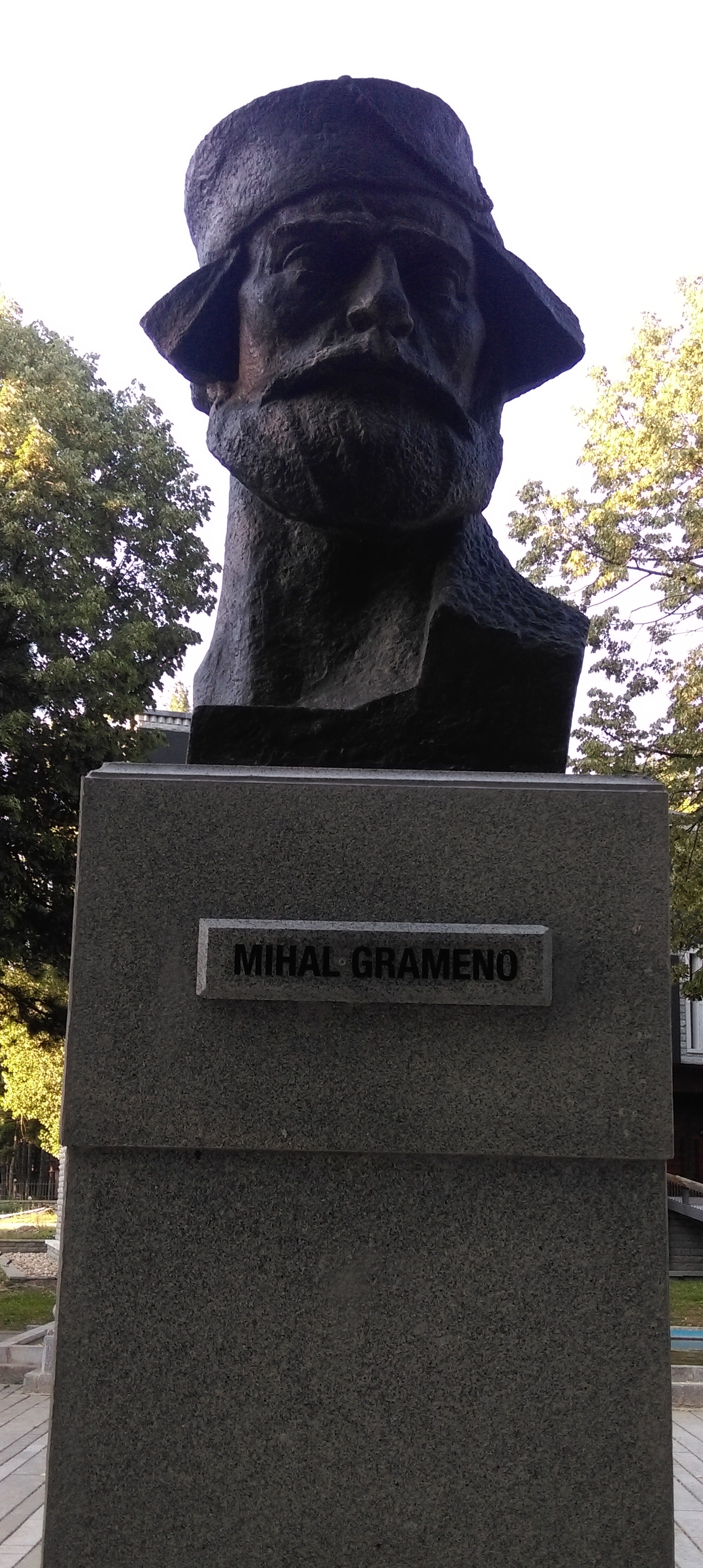
Bust of Mihal Grameno, Korçë

Mihal Grameno's published works include:

- Vdekja (The Death), a patriotic poem published in 1903;
- Mallkimi i gjuhës shqipe (The curse upon the Albanian language), a comedy published in Bucharest, 1905;
- Vdekja e Piros (The Death of Pyrrhus), a historical tragedy published in Sofia, 1906;
- Oxhaku (The Hearth), E puthura (The Kiss), and Varr' i pagëzimit (The Tomb of the Baptism), Korçë, 1909, short stories;
- Plagët (The wounds), Manastir, 1912, a volume of poetry;
- Kryengritja shqiptare, Korçë, 1925 (The Albanian Uprising), memoirs of his experiences as a guerrilla fighter against the Turkish and Greek troops.

== Sources ==
- Lloshi, Xhevat (2008). Rreth Alfabetit te Shqipes [Around the Albanian Alphabet]. Logos. ISBN 9789989582684.
- Skendi, Stavro (1967). The Albanian national awakening. Princeton: Princeton University Press. ISBN 9781400847761.
- Blumi, Isa (2001). "Teaching Loyalty in the Late Ottoman Balkans: Educational Reform in the Vilayets of Manastir and Yanya, 1878–1912". Comparative Studies of South Asia, Africa and the Middle East. 21 (1–2): 15–23. doi:10.1215/1089201x-21-1-2-15. S2CID 144645763.
- Hoerder, Dirk; Harzig, Christiane (1987). The Immigrant Labor Press in North America, 1840s–1970s: An Annotated Bibliography: Volume 2: Migrants from Eastern and Southeastern Europe 031326077X. Bloomsbury Academic. ISBN 9780313260773.
