= Heroes' Cemetery =

Heroes' Cemetery may refer to:

- Giri Tunggal Heroes' Cemetery, Semarang, Central Java, Indonesia
- Libingan ng mga Bayani, Taguig, Philippines
- Kalibata Heroes' Cemetery, South Jakarta, Indonesia
- Kuching Heroes' Cemetery, Kuching, Sarawak, Malaysia
- Kusumanegara Heroes' Cemetery, also known as Semaki Heroes' Cemetery, in Yogyakarta, Indonesia
- Maaveerar Thuyilum Illam (heroes' resting place), Tamil Eelam, Sri Lanka
- Martyrs' Cemetery, Korçë, Albania
