= Autonomous Province of Korçë =

1916–1920 republic in Europe

Coordinates: 40°37′23″N 20°46′31″E

Autonomous Province of Korçë Krahina Autonome e Korçës (Albanian)
- 1916–1920
- Flag

- Albania after its fragmentation in 1916
- Status: Protectorate of France
- Capital: Korçë
- Common languages: Albanian, French
- Government: 14-member local government
- Prefect of Police
  - 1916–1917: Themistokli Gërmenji
- Historical era: World War I
  - Protocol signed: December 10, 1916
  - French Army depart: June 15, 1920
- Currency: Korçë frange
Preceded by	Succeeded by
Bulgarian occupation of Albania	Principality of Albania

The Autonomous Province of Korçë (Albanian: Krahina Autonome e Korçës), sometimes referred to as Republic of Korçë (French: République de Koritza), was an autonomous legal entity established in 27/10 December 1916, by the local French forces after the city of Korçë fell under their control during World War I, and which lasted until 1920.

Due to developments in the Macedonian Front of World War I the city of Korçë came under French control (1916–20). During this time 14 representatives of Korçë and French Colonel Descoins signed a protocol that proclaimed the Autonomous Albanian Province of Korçë under the military protection of the French army and with Themistokli Gërmenji as Prefect of Police.

The new authorities introduced Albanian and French as the official language and replaced Greek schools with Albanian ones, which were forbidden during the Greek administration of the city. There was also a French school in Korçë and one of its many students, and later teachers, was Enver Hoxha, the future leader of communist Albania.

== Background ==
The Republic of Korçë was established in 1916 during World War I. The Austro-Hungarian army invaded northern Albania in the spring of 1916, the Bulgarian army occupied the eastern parts of Albania, including the city of Elbassan (which was later handed over to Austria-Hungary). The French army occupied Korçë and its surrounding areas on November 29, 1916. Italy occupied the port of Vlorë and the region of south Principality of Albania in December 1914 and in the autumn 1916.

=== Northern Epirus question ===
Southern Albania is a region with substantial Albanian (both Muslim and Orthodox), Aromanian and Greek communities. The Greek national view was to classify all Aromanians and Orthodox Albanians as part of the Greek minority. The Great Powers signed the Protocol of Florence and awarded the region to the newly founded Principality of Albania on December 17, 1913. To avert the possibility of Albania taking control of the region as Greek forces were withdrawn, pro-Greek Epirotes decided to declare their own separate political identity.

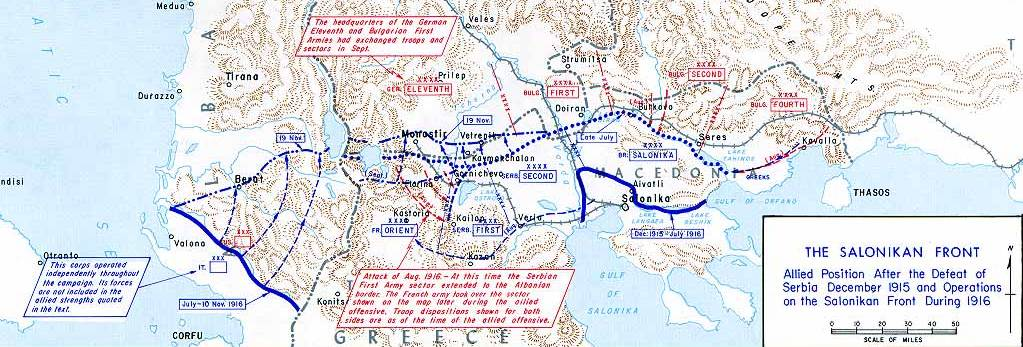
Operation of connecting Italian troops with Allies on Macedonian front in period December 1915 – December 1916

On February 28, 1914, the Autonomous Republic of Northern Epirus was declared in Gjirokastër and a provisional government was formed. The Protocol of Corfu was signed on May 17, 1914, and the Albanian government officially recognized the area of Northern Epirus as an autonomous region within the Albanian state. Soon after the outbreak of World War I (July 1914), the situation in Albania became unstable and political chaos ensued. As the country split into a number of regional governments, Prince William departed the country in September 1914.

=== Greek military and civil administration ===
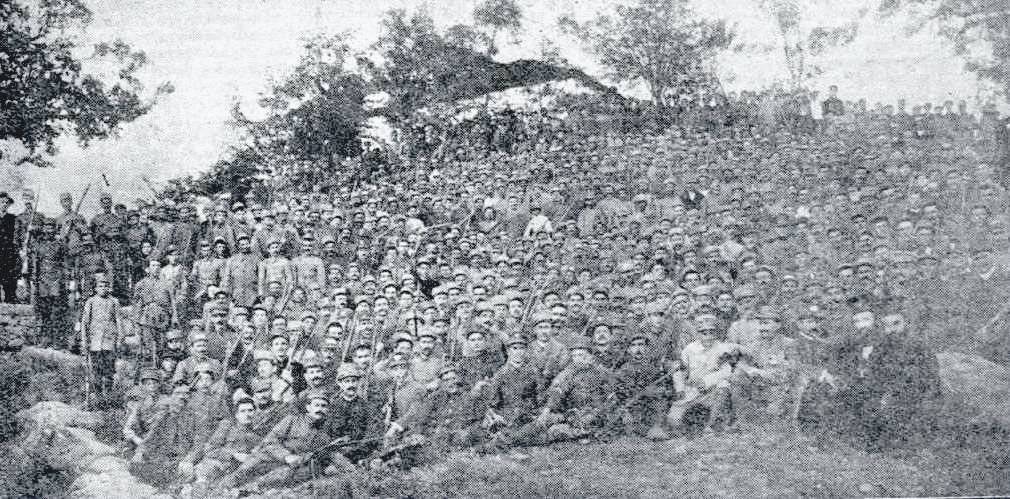
Troops of the Autonomous Republic of Northern Epirus (Sacred Bands) in Korçë (1914)

On October 27, 1914, after approval from the Great Powers, the Greek army re-entered the area. During the Greek administration, and while the First World War continued, it had been agreed between Greece, Italy and the Great Powers that the final settlement of the Northern Epirote issue should be left to the future, after the war ended. After Venizelos' resignation in December however, the succeeding royalist governments were determined to exploit the situation and pre-determine the region's future by incorporating it formally within the Greek state. In the first months of 1916, Northern Epirus participated in the Greek elections and elected 16 representatives for the Greek Parliament. In March, the region's union with Greece was officially declared, and the area was divided into the prefectures of Argyrokastro and Korytsa.

=== Bulgarian occupation of Korçë ===
After the beginning of Bulgaria's engagement in First World War on the side of the Central Powers in autumn 1915, many ethnic Albanians joined the Bulgarians who gave them weapons. The Kingdom of Bulgaria used its army to occupy the eastern part of Albania at the beginning of the occupation of Albania.

After the occupation of the eastern parts of Albania, inclusive of the city of Elbasan, on August 18, 1916, the Bulgarian army, probably attempting to join Austrian forces in Albania and in a combined attack on the Italian army, occupied Korçë and ejected the Greek garrison from the city. Bulgaria's objective was to persuade the Albanian leaders to elect Prince Kiril, second son of Ferdinand I of Bulgaria, as their king. An additional reason for the Bulgarian occupation of Korçë was that Bulgarian positions in Bitolj would be seriously threatened if the Allies gained control of Korçë.

=== Albanian nationalist movement and the Habsburg Empire ===
When the Habsburg forces first advanced into Albania at the tail of the fleeing Serbian forces, they were greeted as liberators, and the Albanian nationalist movement was enthusiastic about their willingness to allow Albanian self government under their wing, and the various Albanian schools they opened across Albania and Kosovo. However, this enthusiasm dimmed after Albanian leaders learned that "assemblies for political purposes were prohibited in districts occupied by Imperial armies", and the disarmament order given by the Austrians was widely resented and even resisted to an extent. As a result, chetas in the area of Korçë led by Themistokli Gërmenji, Mihal Grameno and Sali Butka became interested in other alliances. They would ultimately call for cooperation with the French, because it seemed that the French were inclined to respect what they considered to be Albanian national rights.

=== French occupation of Korçë ===
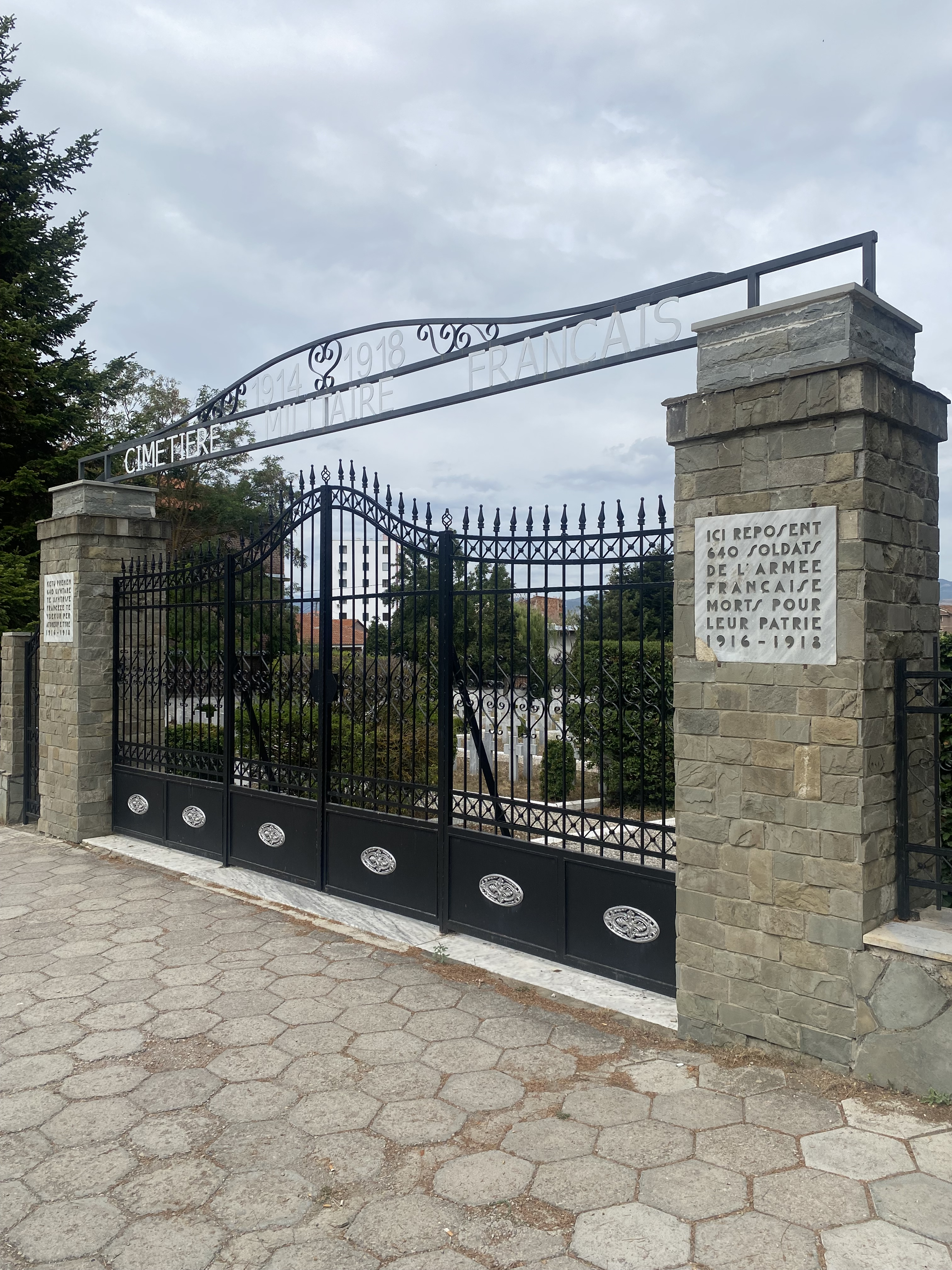
French military cemetery in Korçë

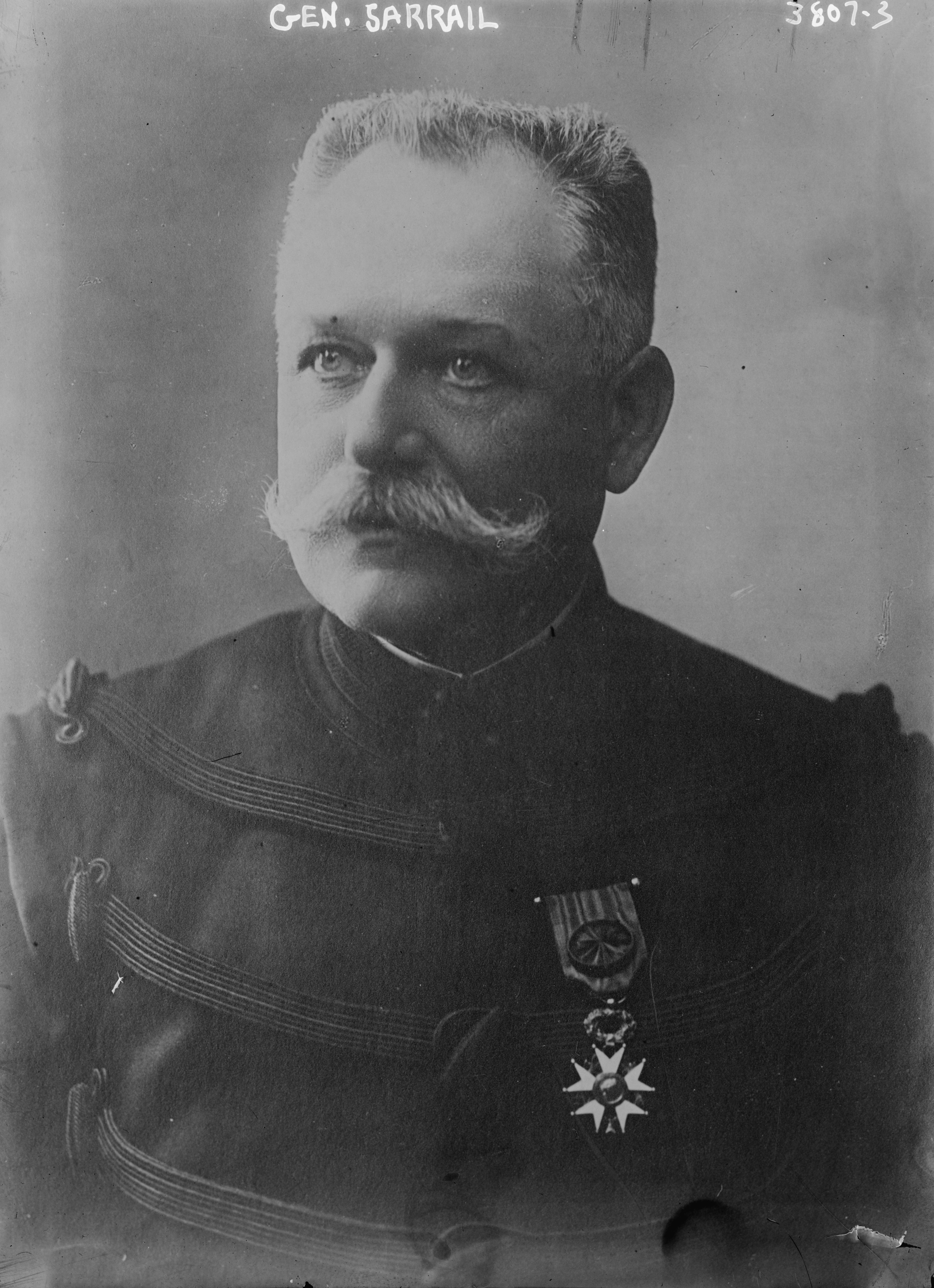
General Maurice Sarrail, commander of the Allied forces on the Macedonian front

French troops entered Korçë on November 29, 1916, during a military operation that aimed to connect the Allied front in Thessaloníki in the Macedonian front to the region in south Albania, which was held by the Italian troops. French troops in Korçë were under General Maurice Sarrail, and under direct command of Colonel Descoins. There were two groups of rebels active in the region of Korçë, one was led by Themistokli Gërmenji and another by Sali Butka. In the meantime, Albanian irregular bands, headed by Butka and cooperating with the Austrian forces, sacked Moscopole, and threatened that Korçë would suffer the same fate if it did not raise the Albanian flag and surrender to Albanian authorities.

== Establishment ==
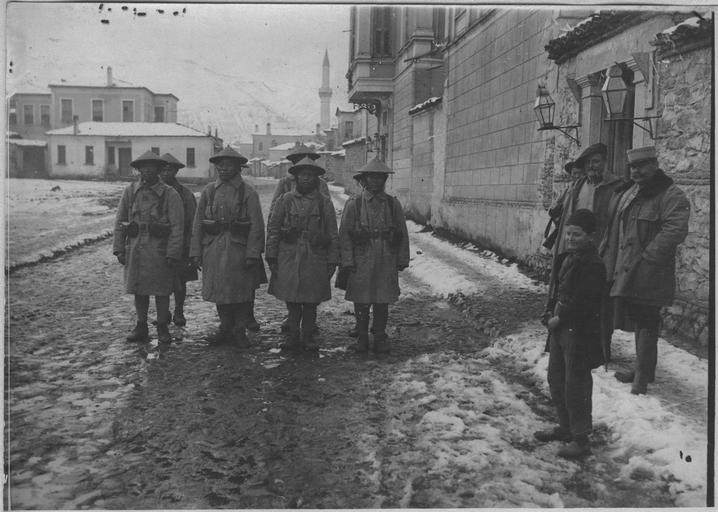
Tonkinese (Vietnamese) Tirailleurs in Korçë, January 1917.

Colonel Descoins made arrangements with the leading Albanian nationalists from Korçë. French officers had a meeting with Themistokli Gërmenji on November 24, 1916. Themistokli Gërmenji came to Korçë from Pogradec, which was occupied by the armies of Austria-Hungary and Bulgaria. The French officers appointed a commission led by Gërmenji. The commission had fourteen members, seven Christians and seven Muslims. The members of this commission were: Rafail Adhami, Kostandin Nocka, Nikolla Vangjeli, Vasil Singjeli, Vasil Kondi, Llambro Mborja, Thimi Cale, Shaqir Shabani, Tefik Rushiti, Hysen Dishnica, Emin Rakipi, Qani Dishnica, Sali Babani and Haki Shemshedini.

The commission held a meeting on December 10 at 9 am in the Saint George's School and Gërmenji held a speech to the gathered men and after the meeting led the commission to the prefecture. In the prefecture they met with Colonel Descoins and with the other French officers. Haki Shemshedini approached to Colonel Descoins on behalf of the commission. Colonel Descoins informed the commission that they should sign a protocol. On December 10, 1916, Colonel Descoins and the commission signed a protocol, according to which an autonomous province would be established on the territories of Korçë, Bilishti, Kolonja, Opar and Gora. It was also agreed that the 14 members of the commission would make up the administrative council, responsible for maintaining order.

=== Protocol ===
The text of the protocol, which stated that it was made according to the wishes of the Albanian delegates of kaza of Korçë, had 9 points that are summarized below:

1. the autonomous province of Korçë is established by this protocol, and refers to the territory of Korçë, Bilishti, Kolonja, Opar and Gora
2. the kaza Korçë will be governed by the Administrative Council with 14 members, half Christian and half Muslim
3. appointments to the positions in the kaza will be made by French military authorities, based on the proposal of the administrative council
4. for maintaining order in the kaza, the prefect of police will be responsible, using newly established gendarmerie and police
5. there shall be established a special unit of "Albanian gendarmerie mobile" which would be responsible for safeguarding the territory's independence and freedom of its people
6. for the same purpose there can be established a regular battalion of volunteers
7. Police, gendarmerie and volunteer troops would be under superior authority of the French officer
8. the official language is Albanian
9. the flag of the kaza Korçë will be traditional Skanderbeg flag with tricolor French flag

The new authorities in Korçë organized the police force and gendarmerie, a post office system and issued postage stamps.

=== Statute ===
On September 27, 1917, General Maurice Sarrail proclaimed a new statute which repealed constitutional protocol. The Administration was entrusted to the commander of the army group Malik. The Administrative Council was replaced with an Advisory Council which was reduced to 12 members (still half Muslims and half Christians). Territory under French administration was divided on two parts, north (Pogradec) and south (Republic of Korçë) of Devolli.

== Governance ==
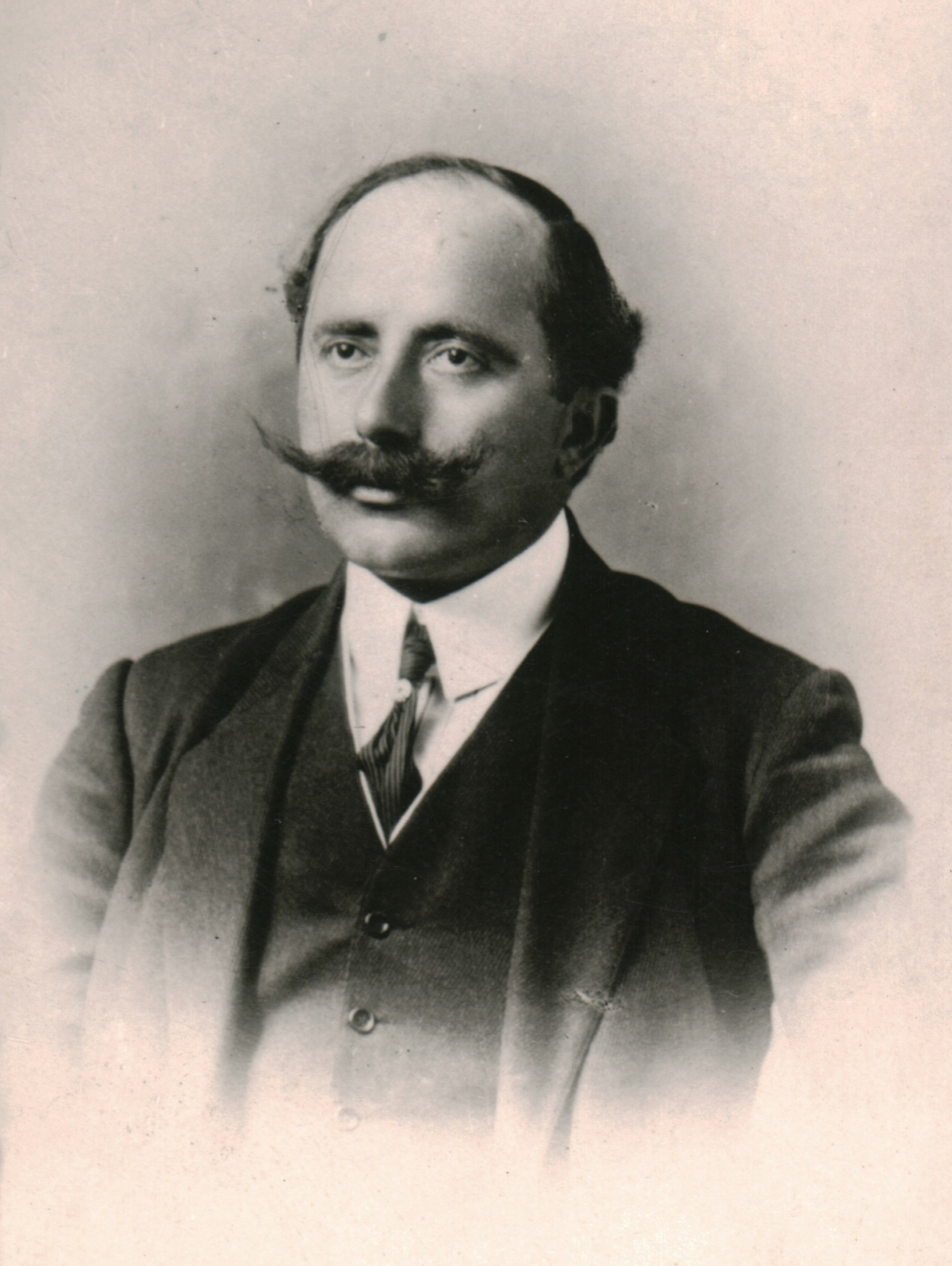
Themistokli Gërmenji, Albanian nationalist leader and prefect of the Autonomous Republic

=== Administration ===
On December 10, 1916, Henry Descoins, the commander of the French garrison of Korçë, with the approval of Maurice Sarrail, declared the Autonomous Albanian Republic of Korçë, and appointed Themistokli Gërmenji as prefect. In the following period the Greeks of the city were persecuted by the Albanian nationalist elements that aimed at acquiring control over Korçë. As a result, the local Greeks asked the French authorities to prolong their occupation until the end of World War I.

In the period of March 1917 – February 1918, Qani Dishnica was appointed as the Chairman of the Albanian Administrative Council. On the French side, the delegated governors of the Republic of Korçë were Henri Descoins (December 10, 1916 – May 11, 1917), Salle (1917–1919) and Reynard Lespinasse (June 1919 – May 26, 1920).

The French delegated governors appointed an officer to be their delegate to the Council. The first officer appointed was reserve Lieutenant Bargeton, who was replaced in the middle of January 1917 by a Lieutenant Siegfried.

The Autonomous Province of Korçë is often cited as an example of early 20th-century international administration and intervention. The French introduced various reforms to improve local governance. They established a framework for a modern administrative system, which included the creation of municipal councils and the implementation of new laws and regulations aimed at ensuring justice and order.

=== Education ===
Cultural relations also saw substantial changes during the French administration. The presence of French troops and officials introduced Western European cultural influences to Korçë. The French promoted education and cultural exchange, supporting the establishment of schools and cultural institutions.

France intended to help in establishing 200 elementary schools on Albanian language, as part of the strategy of Albanian national affirmation. On the other hand, all the Greek schools were forced to close down, while the Greek element of the city was persecuted. The Albanian National Lyceum (French: Le lycée de Korça, Albanian: Liceu Kombëtar i Korçës) high school in Korçë was established in 1917. French authorities claim that they banned opening of the high school because they did not want to offend their Greek allies led by Eleftherios Venizelos' Movement of National Defence, who claimed rights over the area. Some sources find this claim inappropriate, considering that the French Lycée in Thessaloníki sent professor Vital Gerson to lead a small team of three Albanian professors to join a French officer, who gave some notions of French culture, on the opening ceremony of the school. The French National Lyceum was the first Albanian high school that was open to the students of all faiths.

=== Currency ===
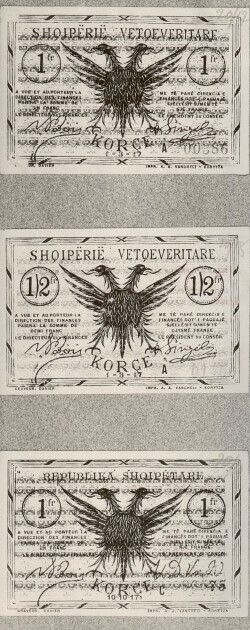
The currency of the Autonomous Province of Korçë.

The frange (Albanian) or franc (French) was the currency of the Autonomous Albanian Republic of Korçë between 1917 and 1921. It was subdivided into 100 centimes. The currency was introduced during the period of French occupation. It was only issued in paper money form, with notes issued in denominations of 50 centimes, 1 and 5 frange. Both paper money and post stamps were engraved by the soldier Davier (a student of Louis-Oscar Roty).

=== Infrastructure ===
In terms of infrastructure, the French occupation brought significant developments. The French authorities invested in the construction and improvement of roads, bridges, and public buildings.

=== Pogradec ===
In September 1917, General Maurice Sarrail undertook an action against the armies of Austria-Hungary and Bulgaria in Albania, and on September 9 French troops captured Pogradec. Together with the armies of Bulgaria and Austria-Hungary, there were Albanians, led by Hysejn Nikolica, fighting against the French troops. Themistokli Gërmenji was awarded the Croix de Guerre in November 1917, for his participation in the French capture of Pogradec with the battalion from Korçë. Although the French government considered appointing Essad Pasha Toptani to govern the Pogradec region it remained under French administration.

=== Military ===
An Albanian rifle regiment was formed, and served as vanguard for the French forces. The French Eastern Army's commander remarked of the First Battalion of Albanian Fusiliers that Cette haute distinction met le bataillon de tirailleurs albanais au niveau des meilleurs régiments français, which mean in English: This high distinction equalize the Albanian tirailleur battalion with the best French regiments.

== Disestablishment and aftermath ==
On December 12, 1916, Italy demanded explanations from the French Ministry of Foreign Affairs, through its ambassador, stating that the establishment of the Autonomous Albanian Republic of Korçë violated the Treaty of London. Austria-Hungary used the French precedent in Korçë to justify the proclamation of the independence of Albania under its protectorate on January 3, 1917, in Shkodër. Italy followed suit when proclaiming the independence of Albania under its protectorate on June 23, 1917, in Gjirokastra.

In November 1917, General Salle reported that the attempt at cooperation between Christians and Muslims had resulted in frequent difficulties. At the end of 1917 Gërmenji was accused of collaboration with the Central Powers and executed in Thessaloniki after being sentenced to death by the French military court.

General Salle removed the already limited autonomy of the Council on February 16, 1918. After the armistices and capitulations at the end of First World War, it was agreed that France and Italy should continue to govern the territories they occupied, and that France, Italy and the United Kingdom together should govern Shkodër. As a result, the French army moved from Korçë on June 15, 1920. After the French army left Korçë, the fate of the territory that it administered was decided by the Paris Peace Conference in 1919.

Because General Maurice Sarrail had demonstrated a tendency to interfere in politics, Prime Minister Georges Clemenceau relieved him of his command in December 1917. There was a strong French influence in Korçë even after the Autonomous Republic ceased to exist. The Albanian National Lyceum remained active until 1939; a French Military Cemetery was built and remains today in the city.

== See also ==
- Maurice Sarrail
- French Military Cemetery, Korçë
- Italian Protectorate on southern Albania
- List of French possessions and colonies

== Sources ==
- Çami, Muin (1999), Shqiptarët dhe francezët në Korçe (1916–1920) (in Albanian), Dituria, ISBN 978-99927-31-37-6
- Augris, Etienne (December 2000). "Korçë dans la Grande Guerre : Le sud-est albanais sous administration française (1916–1918)" (in French). France: Balkanologie, Vol. IV, n° 2. Archived from the original on January 26, 2011.
- Hötte, Hans H.A. (2017). Demeter, Gábor; Turbucz, Dávid (eds.). Atlas of Southeast Europe: Geopolitics and History. Volume Three: 1815-1926. BRILL. ISBN 978-9004361812.
- Popescu, Stefan. "Les français et la république de Kortcha (1916–1920)". Guerres Mondiales et Conflits Contemporains (in French). France: Cairn info. doi:10.3917/gmcc.213.0077. Archived from the original on January 26, 2011.
- Kondis, Basil (1976). Greece and Albania, 1908–1914. Thessaloniki: Institute for Balkan Studies. ISBN 9798840949085.
- Stickney, Edith Pierpont (1926). Southern Albania or Northern Epirus in European International Affairs, 1912–1923. Stanford University Press. ISBN 978-0-8047-6171-0.
- Schurman, Jacob Gould (1916). "The Balkan Wars: 1912–1913". Project Gutenberg.
