= Menduh Zavalani =

Albanian revolutionary and political leader

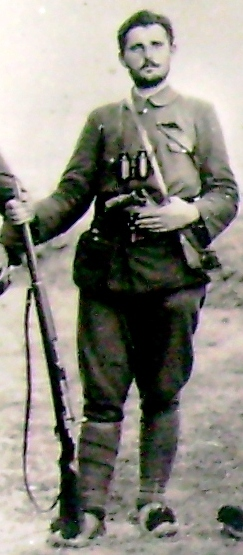
- Menduh Zavalani Menduh Zavalani in revolutionary uniform
- Born: 1889; Korçë, Vilayet of Monastir, Ottoman Empire
- Died: July 1914 (aged 25) near Pogradec, Albania
- Other name: Dume Zavalani
- Occupations: Military commander, political activist, translator
- Known for: Liberation of Përmet from the Ottoman Empire
- Relatives: Lytfi Zavalani (brother); Fehim Zavalani (cousin); Tajar Zavalani (cousin); Ali Këlcyra (cousin)

Menduh Zavalani (1889–1914) was an Albanian revolutionary and political leader active during the last years of the Albanian National Awakening. He formed his own revolutionary band and was one of the leaders that liberated Përmet and the environs from the Ottoman Empire. Menduh was an appointed delegate from his hometown Korça to the Albanian National Congress that proclaimed the Independence of Albania. In the intellectual level Menduh was noted for the translation of Friedrich Schiller's drama Wilhelm Tell into Albanian. He was assassinated at a very young age near Pogradec by a local collaborationist band.

== Life ==
=== Early life ===
Menduh Zavalani alias Dume Zavalani was born in Korçë (now southeastern Albania), then Ottoman Empire in 1889. His father, Mehmet Zavalani, was an Albanian Bektashi bey and his mother was Hedije Luarasi. Menduh's father was a first cousin of Abdyl, Naim and Sami Frashëri, three of the main ideologues of the Albanian National Awakening, while their respective mothers Fatime and Emine Myteveli were sisters from Panarit. His parents had moved to Korça from Zavalan of Dangëllia near Përmet, few years before his birth. Members of his family had already taken an active part in the League of Prizren and the Albanian National Awakening. After receiving the elementary education in his native town, in 1905 Menduh went to Manastir (Bitola) to continue the secondary education.

=== Years in Monastir and the political background ===
In Monastir, under the influence of his trigonometry teacher and deputy principal of the school, Bajo Topulli, Menduh got soon in contact with the patriotic circles. Though still young, he had developed a personality that won their respect and often attended their private meetings. The leading Albanian nationalists were striving to establish a new political organization that would fight for more cultural and political freedom, in a time when the policies of the declining Ottoman Empire towards the Albanian people were fluctuating between giving more cultural freedom and then restraining it by regarding them as Ottomans, not Albanians, considering that the majority of the population was Muslim. The League of Peja in 1899, the last significant political organization to express the demand for autonomy, had no substantial results; the Ottoman government shut it down and in 1902 its leader Haxhi Zeka was executed. Then the Albanian nationalist movement supported and got a new incentive after the Ilinden–Preobrazhenie Uprising of Macedonia in August 1903. The Mürzsteg Agreement, signed in October between the Russian and the Austro-Hungarian Empire, was the diplomatic programme intended to reinstall peace while reaching "a more regular grouping of the nationalities" and more rights for the Christian population in Macedonia. Instead it led to ethnical cleansing of the territory and more violence between Bulgaro-Macedonians, Serbians and Greek armed bands. With the raising of nationalism, as well as the religious and ethnic contrasts, Albanians were also repeatedly target of attacks by neighbouring extremist groups. The armed bands continued to have an upper hand in the political battlefield of all these nations.

Eventually, in November 1905, six Albanian political activists established in Monastir the Secret Committee for the Liberation of Albania, a revolutionary political organization, that would soon lead the Albanian national movement, including the first organized armed bands in the south. Among its leaders were Bajo Topulli, Fehim Zavalani, a prominent intellectual and older cousin of Menduh, and Gjergj Qiriazi (George Kyrias), an Albanian influential writer and Protestant, that was appointed leader of the Committee. Menduh Zavalani became a member of the secret organization and would devote his commitment to its cause beside following the studies. In this period he met with Spiro Bellkameni and Sadik Zharri who were already leading their revolutionary bands and with whom he would cooperate more in the future. In the years 1906–1907 there were attempts for an Albanian-Greek cooperation. The Greek professor Neoklis Kazazis negotiated with the future PM of Albania, Ismail Kemal and both established the short-lived "Greek-Albanian League". In April 1907 a manifesto was published in Athens under this League, declaring equal principles for both nations. But the Greek pretension over south Albania (North Epirus) made Kemal withdraw from the alliance. While in March 1907 the Bulgarian Minister of Interior Genadiev met with Bajo Topulli in Sofia for a possible alliance between the Bulgarian and Albanian armed bands that would include the Vlach (Aromanian) community, too. The proposal was refused by Bajo and a large part of Albanian nationalists, fearing the Bulgarian irredentism.

=== Return to Korça ===
Menduh returned to his hometown Korça in 1908. After the restoration of the constitution by the Young Turks on 24 July 1908, the Albanian movement faced a short breeze of freedom Albanian schools and cultural clubs began to open. Back in Manastir, one week later on 31 July, Menduh's cousin Fehim Zavalani established the first Albanian cultural club in Monastir named "Bashkimi" ("Unity") and in November he organized the Congress of Manastir, that standardized the Albanian alphabet. In Korça, Menduh continued his activity with the "Secret Committee" and started to contribute more in the intellectual sphere. In December 1908, his brother Lytfi Zavalani was editor-in-chief of the first Albanian language newspaper in town, entitled "Korça" and directed by Sami Pojani. Menduh would frequently assist his brother in his editor's job while himself being active as a translator. In 1909 they both translated from French the drama Wilhelm Tell of Friedrich Schiller. The play was successfully performed by the girls of the Albanian school of Korça.

At this period Menduh joined the secret Black Society for Salvation and would soon be a member of its leadership. "Korça" journal would often publish articles calling for Albanian autonomy and more political activism. But after the 31 March Incident, the Young Turks would suspend the constitutional guarantees; they closed Albanian schools and clubs, constrained the freedom of press and tried to impose the Arabic alphabet over the Latin one. On 27 February 1910 there was a massive protest in Korça, in support of the Albanian language and Latin alphabet, attended also by Menduh's brother Lytfi and his uncle Ymer Zavalani. Sami Pojani, the director of "Korça", one of the organizers of the protest, together with Ymer Zavalani were imprisoned. Meanwhile, an armed revolt broke out over the whole Vilayet of Kosovo in March 1910, starting in Prishtina with 15 000 Albanian protesters and following with fightings for three months, until it was suppressed by an army of more than 20 000 Ottomans.

=== Armed movement ===
Following the repression in Korça, Menduh went to Përmet and the surrounding highlands in autumn, and together with Vangjel Gjika and other nationalist leaders were spreading counterpropaganda in the region and searching for volunteer fighters. In spring 1911, Menduh created and led his own revolutionary band, composed of initially 50 men from Korçë and Përmet. In July of that year, after several hours of fighting with the Ottoman garrison of Përmet, they achieved their first success and as a result accumulated valuable military supplies and ammunition. In the end of July, Menduh went to Korça and alongside the bands of Spiro Bellkameni and Qamil Panariti, attempted to release the patriotic leaders that were arrested by the Ottoman government, Mihal Grameno and Themistokli Gërmenji being among them. A group of their fighters went to Orman-Çiflig near the town, to attack the army depot. A violent skirmish followed in the night between 29 and 30 July. Six Albanian fighters were killed while the Ottoman troops lost 2 military officers and 13 soldiers in the battleground. Eventually, the Young Turks set up the military court in Korça for the punishment of the Albanian nationalists.

Menduh returned to Frashër and organized a meeting with the Albanian nationalist leaders of Gjirokastra in the Tekke of Frashër. He reached an agreement of cooperation with them and established closer partnership with Spiro Bellkameni. On 29 August, the bands of Menduh, Spiro and of two of the aforementioned leaders from the region of Gjirokastra, Namik Delvina and Nazif Hadëri, defeated a part of an Ottoman battalion in Pagri, between Përmet and Frashër. Nazif Hadëri was killed during the combat. Meanwhile, the revolt in the north of Albania escalated fast under the leadership of Ded Gjo Luli and also with the support of King Nikola I of Montenegro, expecting their incorporation to the Kingdom of Montenegro. On 23 June 1911, an assembly of the revolt's leaders compiled the main requests of the movement in the Gërçe Memorandum.

Menduh intensified his actions and extended his cooperation with the freed Themistokli Gërmenji. In the beginning of summer 1912, the revolutionary movement in the south had reached a high momentum. With a swift attack, the bands of Menduh, Spiro Bellkameni and Izet Zavalani liberated all the environs of Përmet; Dangëllia with its center Frashër, Dishnicë, Shqeri and the surrounding highlands. After the success, they were in control of a large territory and had paved the way for the liberation of Përmet and the important valley that connected Ioannina with the town of Gjirokastra, Korça and Monastir. Before the last incursion, the bands of Themistokli Gërmenji, Menduh Zavalani, Spiro Bellkameni and Izet Zavalani had a meeting in Kolonja. They made a formal union into one single military unit, though still maintaining their bands. Spiro Bellkameni was appointed general commander and Menduh Zavalani was the secretary-general. The Albanian organized insurrection of 1912 was especially overwhelming in the Vilayet of Kosovo. The Young Turks government resigned and led to the formation of a new one. After liberating most of the towns in Kosovo from the Ottoman control, on 9 August the insurgents presented a list of demands to the new government, the so-called "Twelve Points" of Hasan Prishtina, that became representative for all Albanians. They warned to march to the capital of the vilayet, Üsküb (Skopje) in two days, if the demands weren't met. Without a response, on 11 August the Albanian revolutionaries captured Üsküb.

Meanwhile, Menduh Zavalani and the other leaders in the south were ready to attack Përmet. The revolutionary bands led by him, Spiro Bellkameni, Nexhip Bënja, Mehmet Pavari and Servet Frashëri had seized the town on 13 August. The Ottoman garrison surrender without fighting. The fighters disarmed the garrison and the next day, the Austro-Hungarian consul of Ioannina sent a letter to the Foreign Minister of Austro-Hungarian Empire Count Leopold Berchtold that "the people of Përmet had evicted the Ottoman kaymekam and had declared autonomy". They organized a large meeting where Menduh Zavalani and Spiro Bellkameni gave a speech. An ultimatum with the signatures of all the town's families was sent to the Ottoman government, demanding the autonomy of Albania. On 18 August 1912, the Turkish government accepted the "Twelve Points" with slight changes. Eventually, the Albanian revolutionary bands ceased their fight. Four days later, the united armed bands of southeastern Albania started to gather at the Tekke of Turan and the Tekke of Melçan, a Bektashi shrine worshiped by both Muslims and Christians. On 25 August, more than 1 000 fighters entered triumphally the city of Korça. Spiro Bellkameni, Menduh Zavalani, Themistokli Gërmenji and Izet Zavalani with their fighters led the parade, then came Sali Butka with his men and other bands. People cheered while the music of the marching band "Banda e Lirisë" (Freedom's band) followed their march. Menduh spoke in front of the people of Korça. In his speech he declared that "Until now the 'Committee' (Black Society for Salvation) has worked secretly for the rights of Albania. But from now on we will work openly. [...] And if the government doesn't stand to its word, we will fight again to protect our motherland." They were in the dark of the upcoming war.

On 8 October 1912 the Kingdom of Montenegro declared war to the Ottoman Empire, marking the beginning of the First Balkan War. Within the next ten days Serbia, Bulgaria and Greece followed in declaring war and starting the military offensives that aimed the partitioning of the territories of the Ottoman Empire in the Balkans. The events escalated fast. Menduh's fellow combatant Spiro Bellkameni was killed on 14 October. Predicting a defeat of the Ottomans and concerned about the approaching Serbian army, the Albanian leaders in Skopje, delivered a communication to the representatives of the Great European Powers that the Albanian people were fighting to defend the liberty of Albania against any partition of the territory, and they were not assisting Turkey (Ottoman Empire). The Montenegrin army had laid siege on Shkodër, while the Serbians had conquered Kosovo and were advancing fast in north Albania, committing on the way many massacres and lootings of the Albanian settlements. To get support for the Albanian issue, Ismail Kemal travelled to Istanbul, Bucharest and Vienna, where he met with the foreign minister Berchtold and the British and Italian ambassadors. The Habsburg foreign minister confirmed his support for an Albanian autonomy, rather than independence. But after considering the circumstances in the Balkans, while still in Trieste, Ismail Kemal sent the news he would come to proclaim the Independence of Albania, as the only remaining solution.

=== Independent Albania and his last years ===
Albania was proclaimed an independent, sovereign state on 28 November 1912 in Vlorë, after the return of Ismail Kemal. Despite the formal declaration, only a portion of the Albanian inhabited territory was actually free; the Serbian army had invaded all the north and was about to reach Durrës while the Greek troops had laid siege to Korça and had reached the vicinity of Vlorë. Menduh Zavalani was one of the four appointed delegates from Korça to the Albanian National Congress that proclaimed the Independence of Albania on 28 November 1912. Nevertheless, the Ottoman officials of Korça prevented the telegram messages from reaching the Albanian nationalist leaders, as well as their messages being sent away. Menduh and his compatriots Mihal Grameno, Stavro Karoli and Estref Vërleni learned too late of the independence Assembly and reached Vlorë only five days later. Instead, taking into account that Korça was under siege, they were substituted during the first day of the Assembly by Pandeli Cale, Thanas Floqi and Spiridon Ilo. As soon as arriving in Vlorë they met with Ismail Kemal and discussed about the new government programme.

The first Provisional Government of Albania under the presidency of Ismail Kemal, assumed office on 4 December, one day after their arrival. The same day, the Greek fleet bombarded the town, while some of the shells fell between the consulates of Italy and Austro-Hungary, the two supporters of Albania. Then they landed troops on the island of Sazan in a strategic move of controlling the Bay of Vlorë and cut the communications cable connecting Albania with Italy and the western world. By 6 December the Greek army under Lt. General Konstantinos Damianos had occupied Korça and started to imprison the Albanian nationalists. Menduh and Mihal couldn't return to their hometown and remained in Vlorë. The new state, surrounded by war and political turmoil, was still to be recognized by the international powers. The London Conference of the Ambassadors arbitrary defined the border delimitation for the north of Albania, leaving almost 40% of the Albanians out of the new borders.

It was on 29 July 1913 that Albania was recognized as a sovereign Principality, independent but under the guarantee of the six Great Powers that would appoint a Prince as its ruler and an International Commission of Control. Having already demarked the north of Albania, they assigned the partly Albanian-inhabited territory of southern Epirus to Greece, whereas its north, including the districts of Korçë and Gjirokastër to Albania. The southern Albanian borderline wasn't demarked yet and Greece was unwilling to cooperate with the International Commission of Delimitation. In December, the delimitation Commission determined the frontier-line between Albania and Greece, issuing a report known as the Protocol of Florence and granting Greece one month to evacuate its army that was still occupying the south of Albania (Northern Epirus). The deadline was extended twice, firstly to 1 February, then to 1 March. On 28 February, an insurrection erupted in Gjirokastër and the local pro-Greek population self declared the independence of the Autonomous Republic of Northern Epirus, led by the ex-Foreign Minister of Greece Georgios Christakis-Zografos. Their aim was to reverse the Protocol of Florence that assigned the area to Albania and join with Greece. One day later in Korça the evacuation was accomplished peacefully under the leadership of the Greek Colonel Alexandros Kontoulis, who was strict to the point of threatening to shoot anyone who would raise the flag of the 'Northern Epirus'. Nevertheless, there was a large number of Greek soldiers in the hospital of the city, who had to remain for further treatment reasons. Menduh returned to Korça and then went to Durrës, to welcome the new monarch of Albania, Prince Wilhelm Wied (Prince William of Wied) on 7 March 2014. Prince Wied, landed in Durrës accompanied by his wife Princess Sophie, their children and his new court. Menduh went back to Korça, where the situation was still fragile. Within few days, the new cabinet of ministers was appointed in Durrës, consisting of men from the aristocracy of the country, several of whom had not even resided in Albania or were not enough in contact with common people. Such a choice happened to be unpopular and would even trigger animosity in a part of the people.

On 11 April, the Greek soldiers of the hospital in Korça escaped into the streets of the city, and joined by another underground 'Northern Epirot' band, attacked the Albanian gendarmerie. In a few hours they controlled several vantage points. Menduh was part of the resistance against the insurgents and after four days, the Albanian gendarmerie forces led by Themistokli Gërmenji and the Dutch officers managed to subdue the Greek force after furious street fights. The Greek Bishop of Korçë and twenty members of the city council were arrested for conspiracy and deported to Elbasan. In this time Menduh contracted typhus and fell severely ill. Meantime combats continued further south near Leskovik between the Albanian bands and the Greek infantry, causing several losses on both sides. While continuing the evacuation in April and May, the Greek troops burnt Frashër and several other villages in Kolonjë and Korçë. Even more extreme were the 'Northern Epirot' raiders, who ruined more than 150 villages in south Albania and massacred large numbers of civilians. The Greek government officially revoked any responsibility over the insurgencies in the south, continuously protesting innocence. On 17 May, the International Commission of Control and the representatives of the Autonomous Republic of Northern Epirus signed the Protocol of Corfu, granting the Greek population of south Albania the much sought autonomy. It sanctioned the rights of the Greek population and provided full safeguard for the local self-administration of the Gjirokastër and Korçë districts. Nevertheless, with the state of war that followed, the protocol was never ratified by the parties involved. The same day Albanian insurgents from Shijak marched towards Durrës, what marked the beginning of the Peasant Revolt in Albania. Essad Pasha Toptani was accused of attempting to dethrone Prince Wied through instigating the revolt. He was captured and exiled to Italy, where he was received with honours; an example of the antagonistic interests that mutilated the political environment in Albania at that time.

Menduh Zavalani had recovered from the illness by mid June. He kept on supporting the Albanian gendarmerie despite having no official post. He had a meeting with Themistokli Gërmenji and travelled to Monastir. There he met his old friend and Themistokli's brother, Telemak Gërmenji. Together they organized the delivery of armaments for the Albanian gendarmerie and the local volunteer fighters, through the way Monastir-Ohrid and then to the region of Korça. The revolt that started in central Albania was spreading fast to the south and Wied's government had ordered the reinforcement of the defensive lines in Pogradec (approx. 40 km northwest of Korça). The Battalion of Kolonja engaged in violent fighting against the rebels on 2 July 1914 and many of their men were killed, among them Zalo Prodani and Gani Butka. The next day the rebel bands of the local pro-Ottoman leader Ethem bey Starova had looted Korça that was successively invaded by the Greek bands under Georges Tsontos-Vardas and the regular Greek army on 4 July, after a probable concord between them. After these events, Menduh and Telemak left Monastir in mid July to help the Albanian resistance.

== Death ==
Menduh Zavalani and Telemak Gërmenji were assassinated near the village Tushemisht in Pogradec, a night of mid-July while they were travelling to Korça to assist the Albanian gendarmerie after the Greek reoccupation of the city. They followed the road Monastir-Ohrid-Pogradec and then split after St. Naum: Telemak headed west and entered secretly to Pogradec, while Menduh headed for the nearby village Peshkëpi. Menduh had received a letter, where was written that some Albanian patriots wanted to meet him, failing to realize that the letter was forged.

That night, Telemak was kidnapped in Pogradec, at the house of a friend of him. Menduh was captured while leaving the village Peshkëpi, by the same armed rebels of a band of Ethem bey Starova, who was a local leader, notorious for his treachery and criminal acts. According to the report delivered after their death by the Albanian military command of Korça to the Government in Durrës on 22 July, they were certain that Ethem bey Starova was paid and supplied with Serbian weapons through the archimandrite of the Monastery of Saint Naum, then had reached a secret agreement with the Greek bands.

The rebels killed Menduh and Telemak most probably near Tushemisht and then cast them into the Ohrid lake, after tying a rock to their necks Despite the later efforts, their corpses were never found and they have been left without a grave to this day.

== Legacy ==
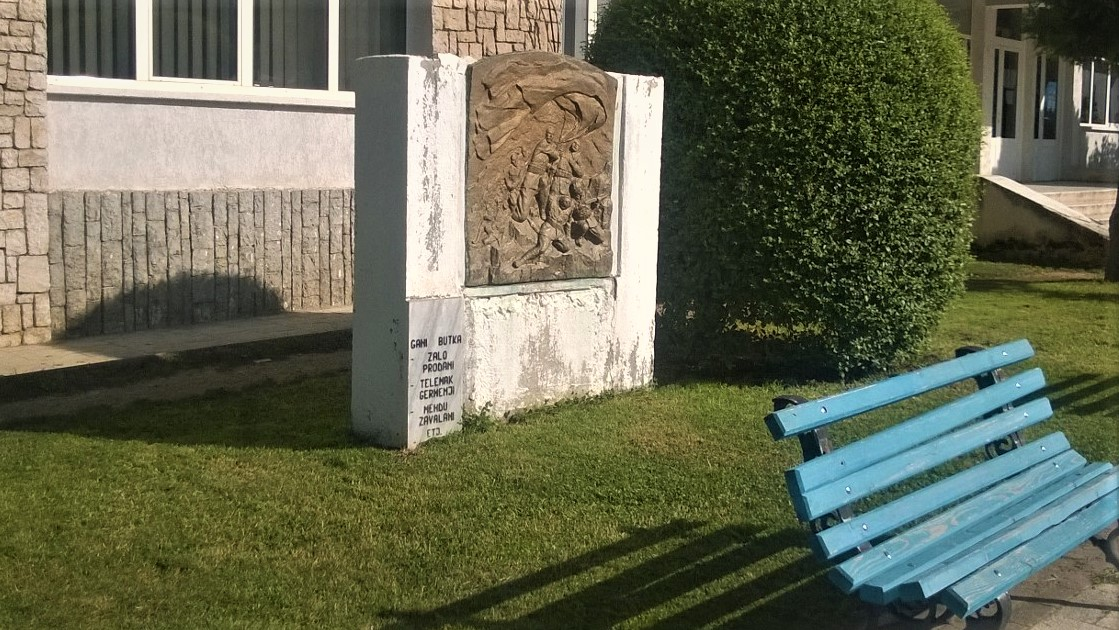
Memorial in the Pogradec city centre, dedicated to the Albanian patriots: Menduh Zavalani, Telemak Gërmenji, Zalo Prodani, Gani Butka.

In 1909, together with his older brother Lytfi, Menduh Zavalani translated from French into Albanian the drama Wilhelm Tell of Friedrich Schiller, that was successfully performed by the girls of the Albanian school of Korça. In honour of Menduh Zavalani, one street in Tirana and another in Pogradec bear his name. He stood for a brotherhood amidst Christians and Muslims, giving his own contribution for overcoming religious divisions.

A memorial bas-relief sculpture is erected in front of the Municipality of Pogradec, in memory of four martyr patriots that died for an independent Albania, among whom is Menduh Zavalani. The Albanian people dedicated a dimeter verse to Menduh Zavalani and the two other martyr patriots Themistokli Gërmenji and Spiro Bellkameni who were all assassinated. A simple metaphor implies their life and activism was crucial for Albania's freedom.

Original Albanian

Lumja ti moj Shqipëri
Që hoqe nga goja frenë
Pate një Themistokli
Dhe Spiron e Mendu bénë

English translation

Lucky you Albania
To remove your martingale
You had a Themistokli
And Spiro and Menduh bey
