= Protocol of Kapshtica =

1920 agreement between Albania and Greece

Protocol of Kapshtica also known as Kapshtica Protocol, or Kapshtica Agreement, was an agreement between Albanian and Greek representatives signed in the border town of Kapshticë on 28 May 1920. Under this agreement both sides accepted the pre-World War I Greek-Albanian border status, as well as a number of provisions for the protection of the local Greek population of Korçë District and its educational and religious rights.

== Background ==
During World War I, Greece was one of seven countries to occupy Albania, filling the vacuum left after the collapse of Ottoman Empire in the Balkans during the Balkan Wars. Greece claimed parts of southern Albania as "Northern Epirus", since a sizeable Greek minority lived there. In 1915, Greek positions were occupied by Italian troops in Gjirokastër and French troops in Korçë.

After the disestablishment of the Autonomous Albanian Republic of Korçë, French troops left the area which incorporated in the newly created Albanian state, and the Paris Peace Conference reaffirmed the borders. Nevertheless, tensions were present in that part of Albanian-Greek border.

== Agreement ==
French troops stayed in Korçë until May 24, 1920. Two days later, on May 26, 1920, after a big rally held at Korçë, and later in Bilisht and Pogradec, Albanians demanded the incorporation of former Autonomous Albanian Republic of Korçë into the Albanian state, informing the Tirana government via local representatives there about the tense situation in Korçë, especially on the border with Greece. Greek government was waiting for an approval from the British side and would not take any military action in southern Albania without their consent. Considering (allegedly) the recent oil discoveries, and the negotiation for Thrace and Dodecanese Islands taking place at that time, the British shifted their positioning towards the conservation of the actual border and support to the Albanian state, thus the only way left were the negotiations. After a quick meeting, made in Florina between the Greek and Albanian representatives, it was decided on 28 May 1920 to proceed with the meeting in Kapshticë where the agreement was signed and was known as "Kapshtica Protocol", or "Albanian-Greek Protocol of Kopshtica", which would remain in force until the issue would be resolved by the Peace Conference. The head of delegations were Josif Koçi for the Albanian side and Achilleas Kalevras for the Greek side. This would be the very first protocol signed between Albania and any foreign country.

== Terms ==
Both parts declared their friendly relations. The Albanian side proclaimed that it will respect the rights of the Greek communities of the region, including the operation of Greek schools and churches.

== Aftermath ==
From the strategic point of view, this treaty was important for the Albanian state. Not only the southeastern border was temporarily assured, but the Albanian side could gather forces and concentrate on western areas of Vlorë, occupied by the Italians, which would finalize with the Vlora War.

After the Italian-Albanian reconciliation, in August 1920, the Albanian side refused to recognize the validity of the Protocol of Kapshtica. Latter, in 1921 it declared to the League of Nations that it will respect the rights of the Greek population. However, a Greek minority was recognized only around Gjirokastër, in southwest Albania.

== See also ==
- Greek-Albanian relations
