= Pandeli Cale =

Albanian politician (1879–1923)

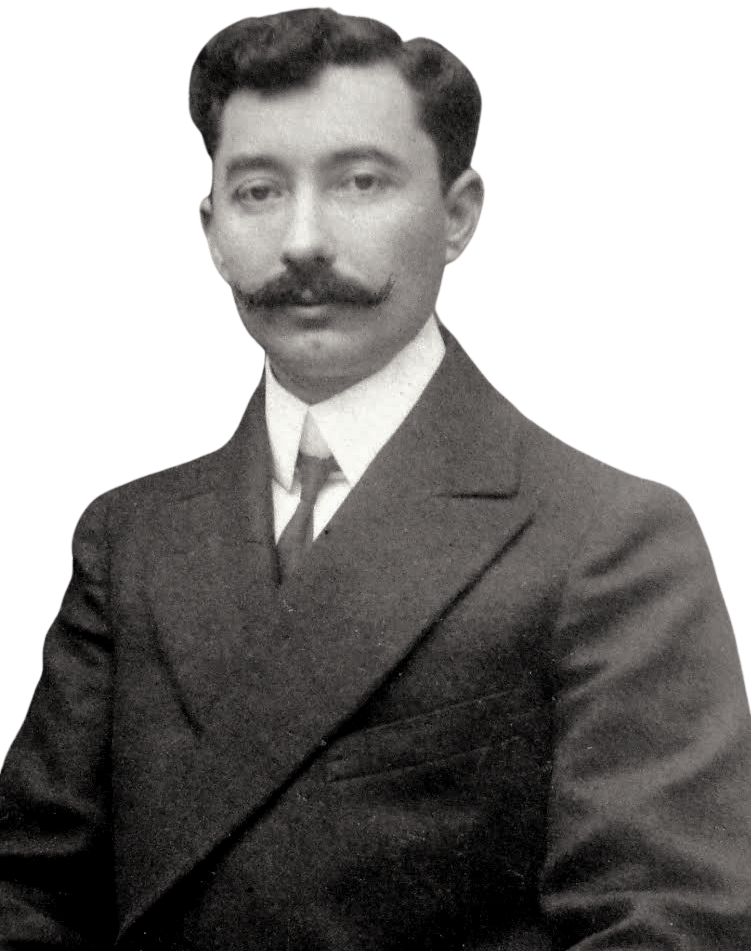
- Born: March 28, 1879; Korçë, Vilayet of Monastir, Ottoman Empire (modern Albania)
- Died: 5 August 1923 (aged 44); Thessaloniki, Kingdom of Greece
- Known for: Albanian Declaration of Independence; Provisional Government of Albania; Paris Peace Conference, 1919; Kapshtica Protocol

Pandeli Cale (1879–1923)^{[a]} was one of the signatories of the Albanian Declaration of Independence. He subsequently served as Minister of Agriculture in the Provisional Government of Albania.

== Biography ==
Cale was born in Korçë on 28 March 1879. He finished the French Classic Lyceum in Alexandria, Egypt. During 1900–1904, he worked in the Bucharest Albanian colony, returning in Albania in 1904. Sent by the Albanian diaspora in Romania to be their representative in southern Albania, Cale aimed to influence Orthodox Christians to join an uprising if Muslims and their beys would rise against the empire. Cale was also insistent on forming guerrilla bands and suggested that care should be taken when choosing their leaders from among Albanian patriots. He was one of the co-founders of the Secret Albanian Committee in Thessaloniki, together with Themistokli Gërmenji, and Midhat Frashëri. He was president of the society "Freedom's Band" (Albanian: Banda e Lirisë) in 1908. In February 1909, he was elected secretary of the society "Lidhja orthodhokse" (English: Orthodox League). He was quite active during the Albanian uprisings of 1910 – 1912. He was a participant in the 5 November 1912 meeting, and voluntarily accompanied Ismail Qemali in his way to Albania.

On 28 November 1912, as a delegate of Korça region, he signed the Albanian declaration of independence as "Pandeli Cale". He was elected Minister of Agriculture, Industry and Commerce in Ismail Qemali's cabinet. He led the negotiations with Count Leopold Berchtold, foreign minister of Austria-Hungary, and the British and Italian ambassadors, which led to those countries' support for Albanian autonomy.

The first years of World War I found Cale in Switzerland, Ukraine, Bulgaria, and France. In 1919, he returned to Albania. He is mentioned as part of the Albanian delegation to the League of Nations Committee of the Peace Conference in 1919, together with Fan Noli, Hil Mosi, Gjergj Adhamidhi (Frashëri), lobbying for Albania's membership application, which was contested by Greece and Yugoslavia. Pandeli was the designer and signer of the Kapshtica Protocol. The same year he got elected Mayor of Korçë, and later in February 1921 member of the first Albanian parliament.

Cale died due to serious health implications in a hospital in Thessaloniki, Greece.

== Notes ==
a.	According to Elsie, the birth year is 1874. All other sources cite 1879.

== Sources ==
"History of Albanian People" Albanian Academy of Science.ISBN 9992716231
