= Martyrs' Cemetery, Korçë =

Cemetery in Albania

Coordinates: 40°37′08″N 20°47′23″E

The Cemetery of the Martyrs, Varrezat e Dëshmorëve, or sometimes Heroes' Cemetery, is a cemetery located above the city of Korçë, Albania. The cemetery features a large statue of a soldier with a raised fist, as a memory for fallen soldiers who died during World War II in Albania. The statue is located on top of the Rruga Mbledhja e Beratit.

There is also the French Military Cemetery, Korçë, Varrezat franceze në Korçë.
