= Evdhoksi Gërmenji =

Albanian women's rights activist and magazine editor

Evdhoksi Gërmenji (fl. 1921–1922) was an Albanian women's rights activist and magazine editor. She led the regional women's association Përlindja in Korçë.

== Biography ==
Gërmenji was an Albanian women's rights activist. She led the regional women's association Përlindja in Korçë and built branches in Albanian villages. She edited the association monthly women's magazine Mbleta, serving as editor in chief from 1921 to 1922.

Gërmenji was married to Albanian nationalist and guerrilla fighter Themistokli Gërmenji. Shortly before he was executed due to a miscarriage of justice by a French military tribunal in 1917, he wrote to his wife: “My dear Evdhoksi, I have fallen victim to fabrications. Since I am not returning to Korça and I am no longer home, you have the right to marry... Know that I die innocent."
