= Venizelos =

Venizelos (Greek: Βενιζέλος) is a Greek surname. It may refer to:

- Eleftherios Venizelos (1864–1936), Greek politician
- Sofoklis Venizelos (1894–1964), Greek politician, son of the above
- Evangelos Venizelos (born 1957), Greek politician, unrelated to the above
- Andreas Venizelos, a fictional character in the Honorverse

== See also ==
- Eleftherios Venizelos International Airport
- Eleftherios Venizelos, Crete
