= French Military Cemetery, Korçë =

Cemetery in Albania

Coordinates: 40°37′53″N 20°47′22″E

The French Military Cemetery is a large cemetery located in Korçë, Albania. It is located near Rinia Park. The French military cemetery has 640 crosses. They mark the graves of the French soldiers that died here in the conflicts of the First World War.
