= Themistokli Gërmenji =

Albanian nationalist and guerilla fighter

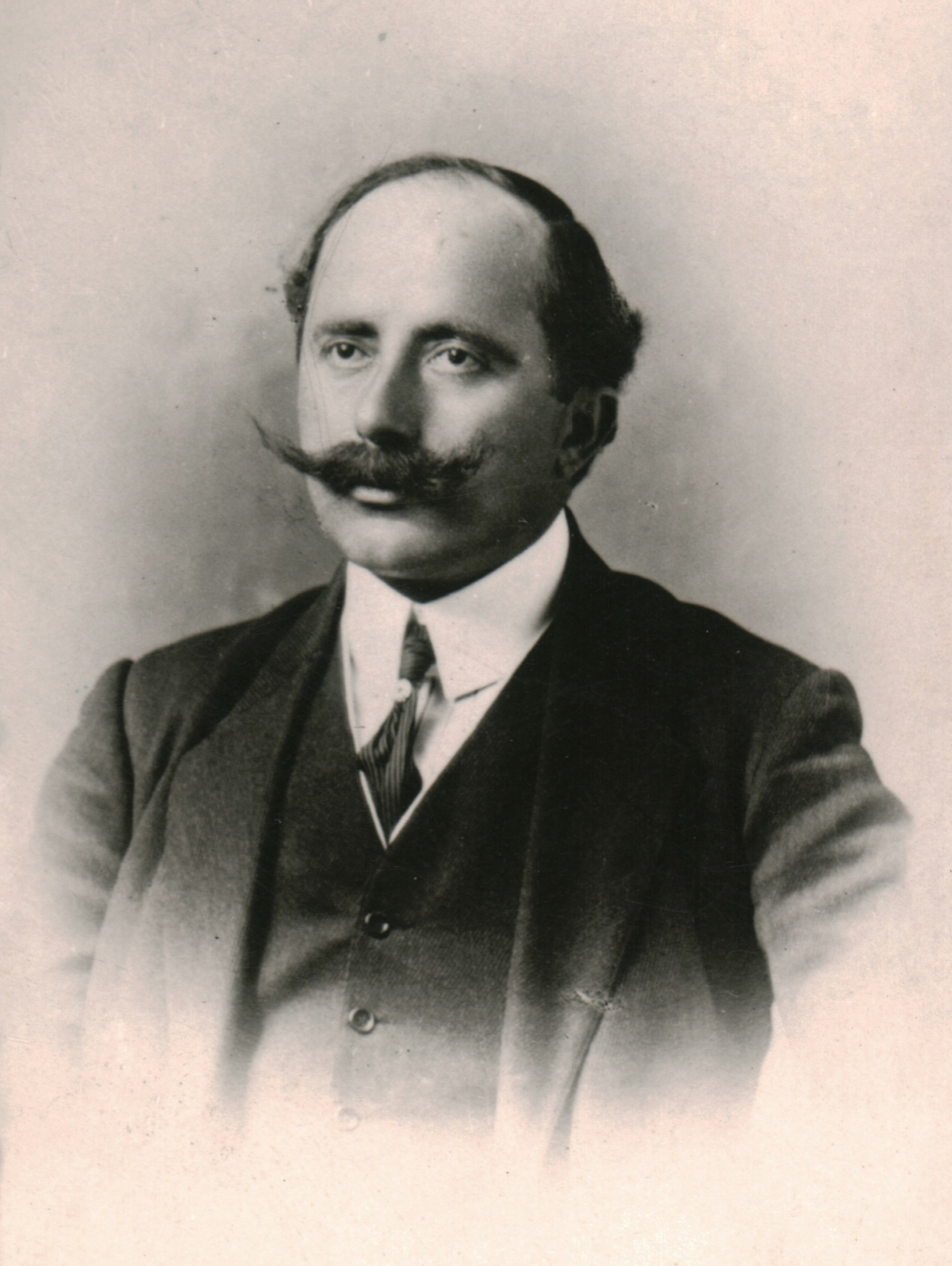
- Born: January 1871; Korçë, Ottoman Empire (modern Albania)
- Died: 9 November 1917 (aged 46); Thessaloniki, Greece
- Occupations: Prefect of police Revolutionary
- Known for: Albanian National Awakening; Black Society for Salvation; Secret Association of the Albanians of Manastir; Autonomous Albanian Republic of Korçë
- Spouse: Evdhoksi Gërmenji
- Parents: Atanas Gërmenji (father); Katarina Gërmenji (mother)
- Relatives: Demetrius Gërmenji (grandfather); Konstandina (grandmother); Spiro Gërmenji and Telemakun Gërmenji (brothers); Aleksandra Gërmenji and Efterpina Gërmenji (sisters)

Themistokli Gërmenji (1871 – 1917) was an Albanian nationalist figure and guerrilla fighter. One of the activists of the Albanian National Awakening and the leader of the Albanian irregulars from 1909 to 1914, he became the prefect of police of the Autonomous Albanian Republic of Korçë from 1916 until his execution due to a miscarriage of justice by a French military tribunal in 1917.

== Biography ==
=== Family ===
Themistokli was born in Gërmenji family in Korçë in 1871. His family was originally from Gërmenj, a village of modern-day Kolonjë of Albania, near border with Greece. Themistokli's grandfather Demetrius moved from Gërmenj to Korçë in 1860 and adopted Gërmenji as his last name. Because of economic reasons Themistokli's father Atanas moved from Korçë, first to Egypt and then to Bucharest and Istanbul. His mother Konstandina, wife Katarina, three sons (Spiro, Telemakun and Themistokli) and two daughters (Aleksandra and Efterpina) remained in Korçë.

=== Career ===
His Liria English: Freedom Hotel was a centre of the Albanian activism of the Albanian National Awakening in planning the Congress of Monastir and Albanian revolts in the period 1909—1912. Gërmenji was a supporter of the cooperation with Bulgarians.

In 1911, he traveled to Italy and Greece to find support. In 1911 he was declared persona non grata in Greece because he refused to agree not to carry on nationalistic propaganda south of Vlora as a condition for cooperation with the Greek authorities against the Ottoman Empire. Gërmenji led an Albanian guerilla band composed of different religions and social classes fighting against the Ottoman Empire. While operating between Saranda and Gjirokastra, attempting to capture the military supplies of Ottoman army, he was seized and imprisoned in Ioannina. .

During the first stages of the conflict between units of the Principality of Albania and the Autonomous Republic of Northern Epirus he participated at the battle of his native Korça, where the Albanian forces defended unsuccessfully the town against the attack by the forces of the pro-Greek Northern Epirus movement.

=== Autonomous Albanian Republic of Korçë ===
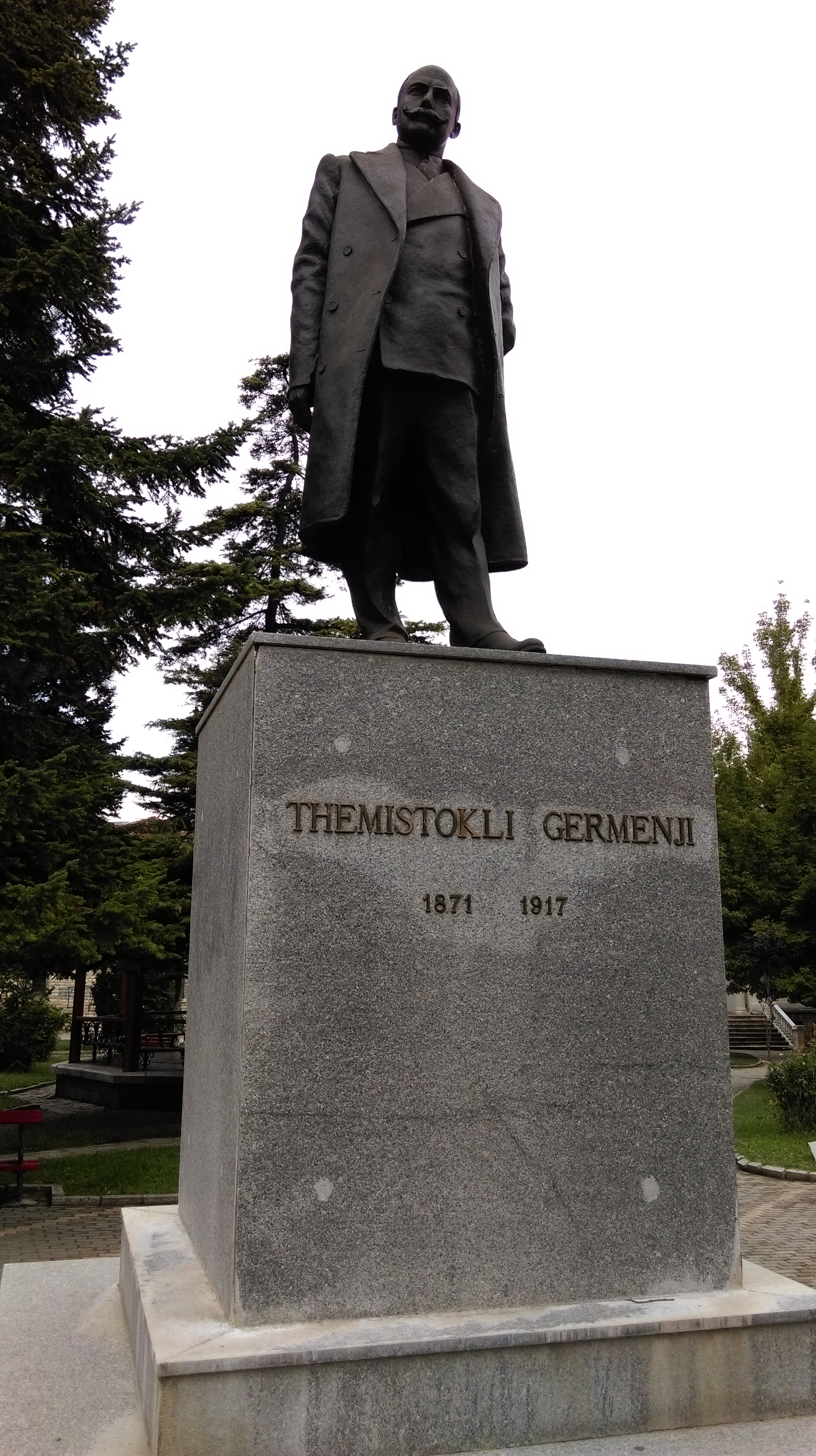
Monument dedicated to Themistokli Gërmenji in the main square of Korçë

French officers had a meeting with Gërmenji on November 24, 1916, before the French army occupied Korçë on November 29. Themistokli Gërmenji came to Korçë from Pogradec, which was occupied by the armies of Austria-Hungary and Bulgaria during Austro-Hungarian and Bulgarian occupation of Albania. The French officers appointed a commission led by Gërmenji.

The commission held a meeting on December 10 at 9 a.m. in the Saint George's School and Gërmenji gave a speech to the gathered men; after the meeting he led the commission to the prefecture. In the prefecture they met with Colonel Descoins and other French officers. Haki Shemshedini approached Colonel Descoins on behalf of the commission. Colonel Descoins informed the commission that they should sign a protocol, which they did: the protocol stipulated that an autonomous province would be established on the territories of Korçë, Bilishti, Kolonja, Opar and Gora. It was also agreed that the 14 members of the commission would make up the administrative council, responsible for maintaining the order.

On December 10, 1916, Henry Descoin, the commander of the French garrison of Korçë, after the approval from Maurice Sarrail, declared the Autonomous Albanian Republic of Korçë, and appointed Gërmenji as prefect. The new authorities in Korçë organized the police force and gendarmerie, a post office system and issued the postage stamps.

Gërmenji was awarded with the Croix de Guerre because he participated in the French capture of Pogradec with the battalion from Korçë. At the end of 1917 however Gërmenji was accused of collaboration with the Central Powers and summarily executed on 7 November in Thessaloniki after being sentenced to death by a French military court. It later became clear that the military tribunal had made a grave judicial error, its members having been led astray by Greek informers who wished Germenji removed since he was a powerful Albanian leader.

== Legacy ==
A statue of Gërmenji as a freedom fighter now stands in a main square of Korçë.

== See also ==
- Autonomous Province of Korçë
- Sali Butka
