= Law enforcement in Albania =

Law enforcement in Albania is the responsibility of several agencies. The responsibility for most tasks lies with the Albanian State Police, a national police agency, which is under the authority of Ministry of Interior. Examples of other agencies with limited policing powers are the Municipal Police, which has administrative functions and operates in the local level. They are controlled by mayors.

== Agencies under the Ministry of Interior ==
=== Albanian Police ===
The Albanian State Police is subordinate to the Ministry of Interior and it is organized by the General Directorate of State Police. It is divided into several departments, which the function of each police department is to maintain general law and order, prevent crime, investigate crime and other events that threaten public order and safety, carry out traffic control and surveillance, and promote traffic safety. Some of the main police departments are:

- Policia e Rendit (Order Police), tasked to deal with issues of public order and safety.
- Policia Rrugore (Road Police), tasked to carry out traffic control and surveillance, and promote traffic safety.
- Policia Kufitare (Border Police), tasked to patrol the state border and migration.
- RENEA, is a special police unit, mostly tasked for counter-terrorism and critical incident response unit.

The Security Academy (Akademia e Sigurisë) is the national university-level unit responsible for general police training, research and development.

=== Republican Guard ===
The Republican Guard (Garda e Republikës) is a structure of special status under the authority of the Ministry of Interior, which has the mission of safeguarding and protecting the high-state personalities and residences, such as the President; Prime Minister; Chairman of the Parliament and others personalities defined by the Law No.8869, dated 22 May 2003 "For the Guard of the Republic of Albania".

=== Internal Affairs and Complaints Service ===
Emblem of SHÇBA

The Internal Affairs and Complaints Service (Shërbimi i Çështjeve të Brendshme dhe Ankesave, SHÇBA) it is an Albanian law-enforcement agency under the Ministry of Interior, which investigates incidents and possible suspicions of law-breaking and professional misconduct attributed to Police officers, Republican Guards and Firefighter officers in the Republic of Albania. The SHÇBA can also refer the cases of misconduct and criminal behavior involving abovementioned employees, such as corruption acts, suspected links with crime and favoring of one side in conflicts. They also are responsible for the investigation of the unjustified wealth of officers on the basis of complaints and reports.

The SHÇBA employees have the attributes of a policeman and a judiciary Police agent, according to the law "On Judiciary Police", hold police ranks and have the status of an employee of the State Police.

== Agencies under the Ministry of Defense ==
=== Coast Guard ===
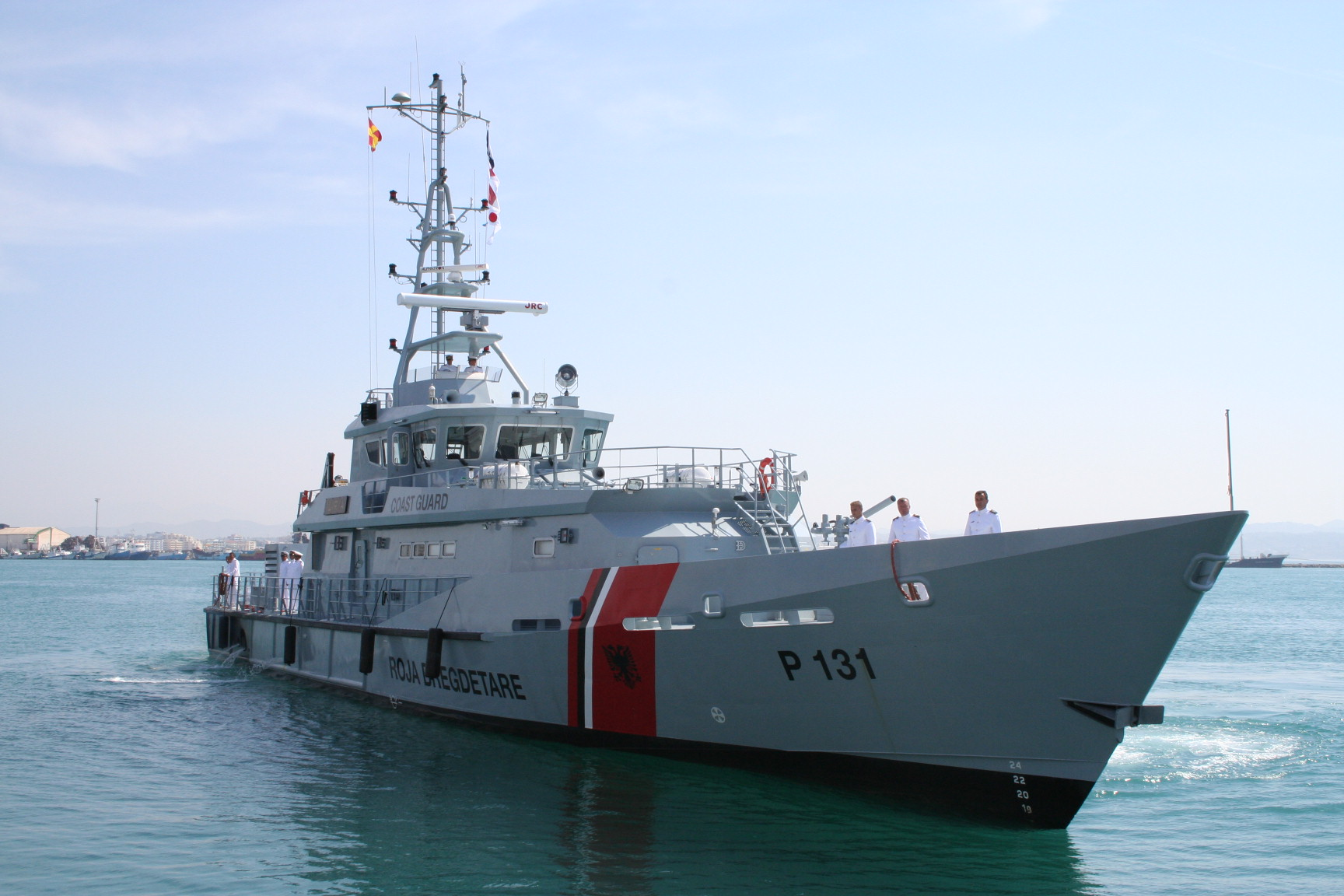
Iliria Patrol Boat Class Damen Stan 4207

The Albanian Coast Guard (Roja Bregdetare) is one of the specialized bodies of the Albanian Navy which is responsible for safeguarding human life and coordinating search and rescue at sea, as well as administrative management, navigation security and territorial waters, with coastal guard functions. Among the competences are the safeguarding of human life at sea, the safety of navigation and maritime transport, as well as the protection of the marine environment, its ecosystems and the oversight of the entire marine fishing industry, the protection of resources to that of the final consumer. The latter include inspections on merchant naval, fishing and recreational vessels, also conducted on foreign merchant ships that climb domestic ports.

=== Military Police ===
The Albanian Military Police or MP (Policia Ushtarake, PU) is a provost branch of the Albanian Armed Forces responsible for the policing of service personnel, and for providing a military police presence both in Albania and while service personnel are deployed overseas on operations and exercises. The PU it is under the authority of Ministry of Defence.

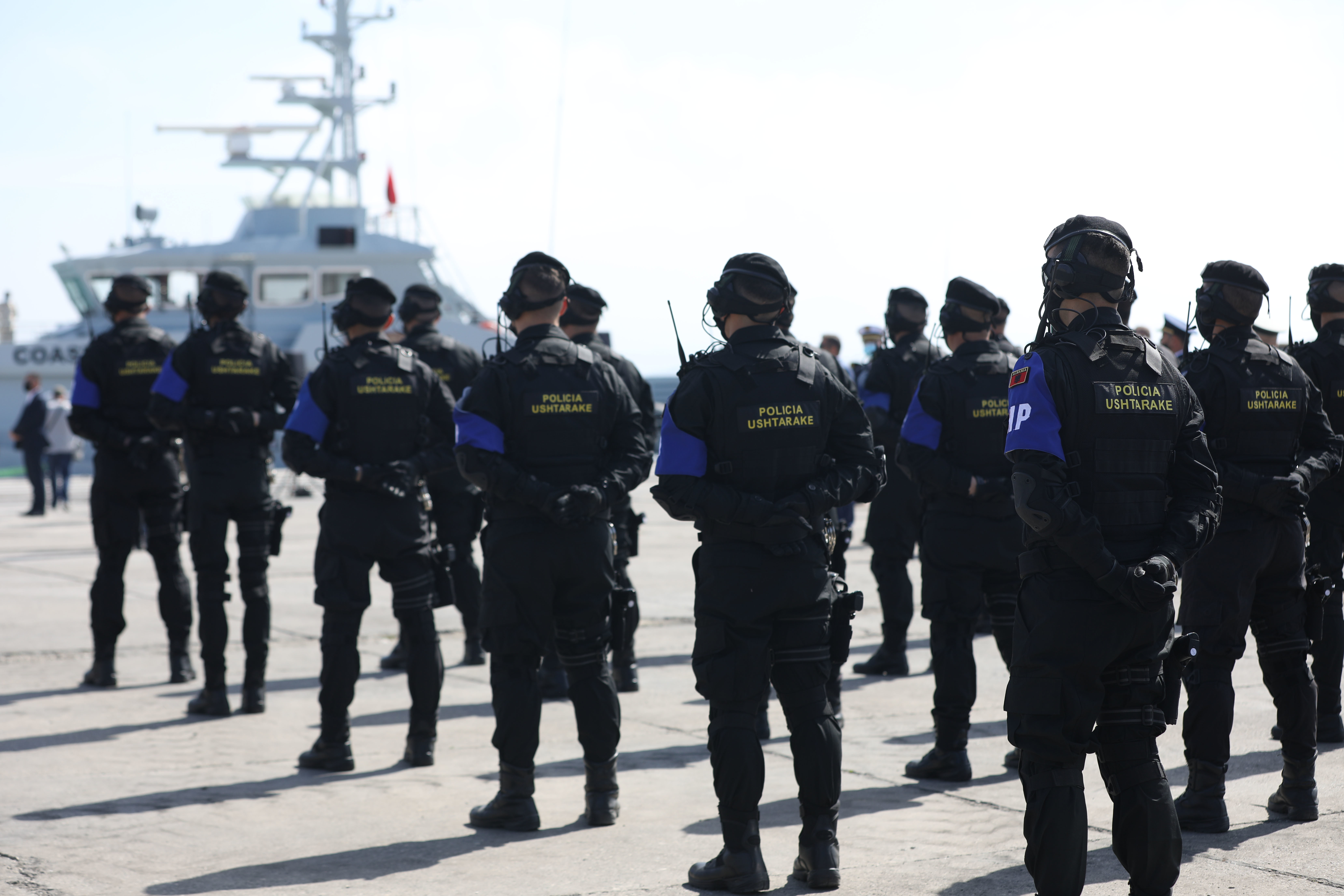
Albanian Military Police personnel.

The PU tasks include:

- Law enforcement and crime prevention of the military law, within the service in Armed Forces;
- Safeguarding of the life, health and dignity of the militaries;
- Take measures for the implementation of legal acts on military law and discipline outside the military structures in public and non-public environments;
- Provides military order in the framework of activities organized in the Armed Forces of the Republic of Albania;
- Take measures for the prevention, detection and prosecution of criminal activity against members of the Armed Forces, property and military facilities;

=== Intelligence and Security Agency ===
The Intelligence and Security Agency (Agjencia e Inteligjencës dhe Sigurisë së Mbrojtjes, AISM) is an Albanian government military intelligence agency responsible for strategic intelligence and technical intelligence assessments, advising defence and government decision-making on national security and international security issues, and the planning and conduct of Albanian Armed Forces operations. AISM is under the authority of the Ministry of Defense and it is one of two Albanian intelligence services, together with the civilian Albanian State Intelligence Service.

== Other law enforcement agencies ==
=== State Intelligence Service ===
The Albanian State Intelligence Service (Shërbimi Informativ Shtetëror, SHISH) is the primary intelligence agency of Albania and provides the necessary information from disclosure and counter-intelligence on national security issues. It is specialized in the prevention of security threats that come from within the state or not. The agency it is under the authority of Prime Minister's Office.

=== Prisons Police ===
The Albanian Prisons Police (Policia e Burgjeve) is an attached agency of the General Directorate of Prisons of Albania, under the authority of Ministry of Justice, which operate the Albanian prison system as corrections officers. The police is responsible for the supervision, safety, and security of prisoners in a prison, jail, or similar form of secure custody.

It ensures the security of Albanian prisons, keeping unauthorized people out and preventing escape by prisoners. It also maintains order inside prisons, handles the transportation of inmates to and from prison and to court or medical appointments, and manages work and education programs for inmates.

=== Forestry Police ===
The Forestry Police (Policia Pyjore) it is a law enforcement agency under the authority of the Ministry of Environment. The body specialized in defending Albanian agroforestry heritage, safeguarding the environment and landscape. It complied with the fulfillment of security services as well as the control of the territory, with particular reference to rural and mountainous areas. The Forestry Police inspectors during the execution of the service, have the same status as the State Police and Judiciary Police.

The Forestry Police have as primary role to safeguarding the wooded areas, but also have other numerous and varied institutional tasks, which is part of a wider context of protection of the environment and the territory, human health, animal protection, flora and landscaping, conservation biodiversity. It is also charged to protect the Albanian National Parks; marine protected areas and protected areas.

Some of important duties of the Forestry Police are:

- Controls the implementation of the law on forests, pastures, protected areas, wild flora and fauna, hunting activities and other activities carried out in the national forest fund by private and public entities, and proposes the revocation of licenses when subjects act in violation of the relevant law;
- Prevents, detects and fights damage, occupation, abuse, alienation, desecration and degradation of forests and forest land, violation of uncontrolled interventions in the forestry fund and in the natural environment;
- Organizes work on prevention and extinction of fires on protected areas, in cooperation with Fire and Rescue service and General Directorate of Civil Emergencies;
- Prevents and takes measures in the cases of illegal exploitation and trading of wood material, crime in the forestry sector, pastures, protected areas and forests with special function, wild flora and fauna, medicinal, aromatic and ethereal herbs, forest and non-forest products of national forests fund, as well as any other activity contrary to the law;

== Local law enforcement agencies ==
=== Municipal Police ===
The Municipal Police (Policia Bashkiake) are law enforcement agencies that are under the control of local government. It is an unarmed force and have fewer powers than the Albanian State Police, such as arresting, criminal cases investigation or other duties which are not the exclusive power of other law enforcement forces. The Municipality Police powers are defined by Law No. 8224, dated 15 May 1997 and they can only exercise them in their own municipality. They have jurisdiction over misdemeanors, supervise and protect the safety of citizens and property, assist and cooperate with the State Police in public order, road safety and so on.

Each local police chief is responsible for the execution of local law enforcement policy and ensures the management, organization and distribution of missions in the local police force. She or he works under the authority of the mayor.

== Police ground vehicles ==
- Chevrolet Aveo
- Ford Focus
- Hyundai i10
- Hyundai Santa Fe
- Škoda Octavia
- Volkswagen Bora (Retired)
- Volkswagen e-Golf
- Volkswagen Transporter

== See also ==
- Albanian Police
- Organized crime in Albania
- Sigurimi—the former secret police force
