= Lake Skadar =

Lake on the border of Albania and Montenegro

- Lake Scutari, Lake Shkodër, Lake Shkodra
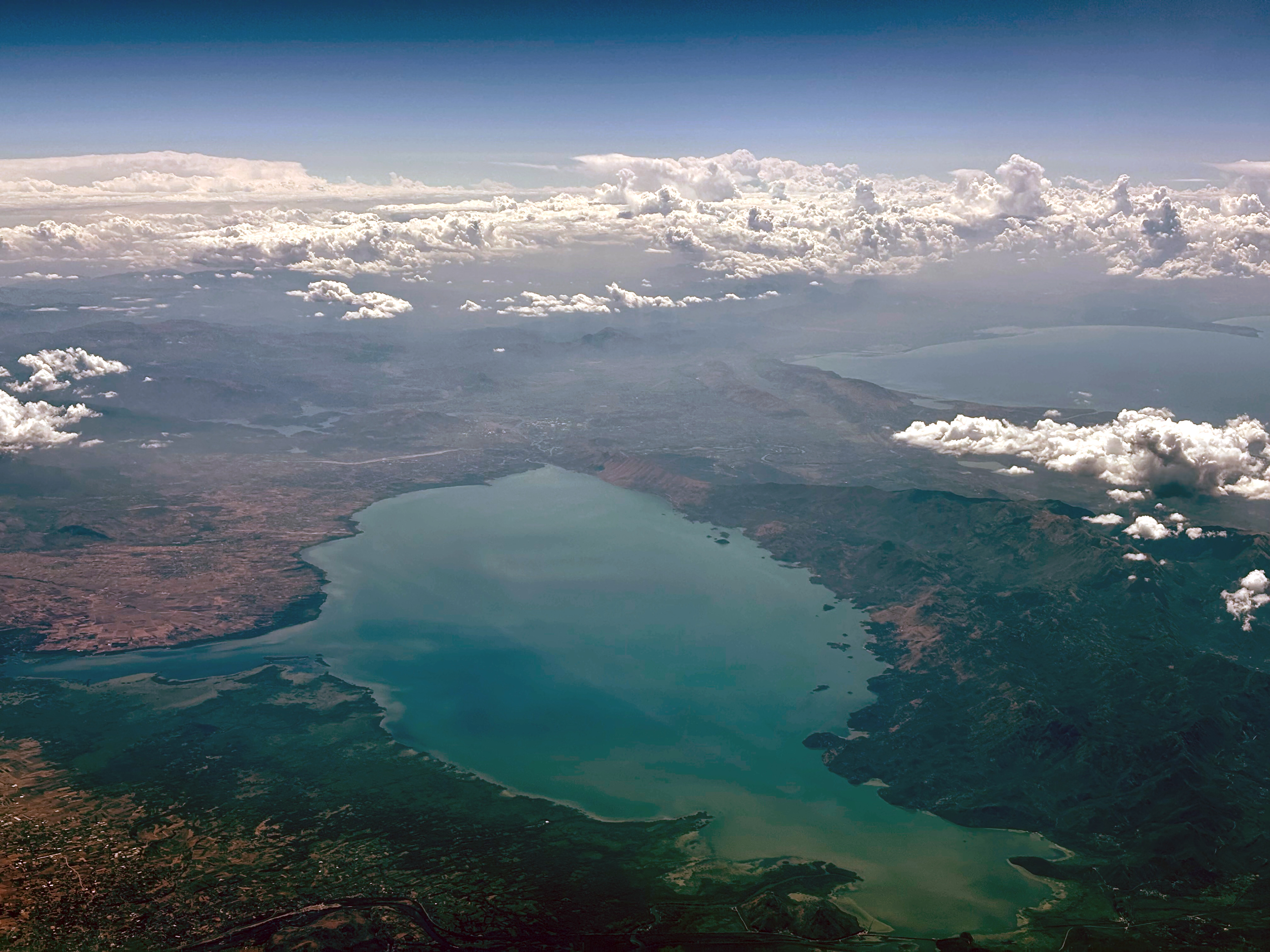
- Aerial view of Lake Skadar

- Location within Albania Location within Montenegro
- Location: Albania–Montenegro border
- Coordinates: 42°10′N 19°19′E
- Primary inflows: Morača
- Primary outflows: Buna
- Basin countries: Albania, Montenegro
- Max. length: 44 km (27 mi)
- Max. width: 14 km (8.7 mi)
- Surface area: 370–530 km^{2} (140–200 sq mi); approximately 65% in Montenegro and 35% in Albania
- Average depth: 5.01 m (16.4 ft)
- Max. depth: 8.3 m (27 ft) 44 m (144 ft)
- Water volume: 1,931.62×10^{6} m^{3} (68.215×10^{9} cu ft)
- Shore length^{1}: 207 km (129 mi) including islands 168 km (104 mi) without islands: 110.5 km (68.7 mi) in Montenegro and 57.5 km (35.7 mi) in Albania
- Surface elevation: 6 m (20 ft)

Ramsar Wetland
- Official name: Skadarsko Jezero
- Designated: 13 December 1995
- Reference no.: 784

Ramsar Wetland
- Official name: Lake Shkodra and River Buna
- Designated: 2 February 2006
- Reference no.: 1598
- ^{1} Shore length is not a well-defined measure.

Lake Skadar or Lake Scutari (Albanian: Liqeni i Shkodrës, pronounced [liˈcɛni i ˈʃkɔdɾəs]; Montenegrin: Скадарско језеро, Skadarsko jezero, pronounced [skâdarskoː jêzero]) – also called Lake Shkodra and Lake Shkodër – lies on the border of Albania and Montenegro, and is the largest lake in Southern Europe. A karst lake, it is named after the Albanian city of Shkodër which lies at its southeastern coast.

The Montenegrin section of the lake and surrounding land have been designated as a national park, while the Albanian part constitutes a nature reserve and a Ramsar site.

== Geography ==
Lake Skadar is the largest lake in the Balkan Peninsula with a surface area that seasonally fluctuates between 370 km^{2} (140 sq mi) and 530 km^{2} (200 sq mi). Lake Skadar itself is located in the western Balkan region.

The lake is located on the border area between Montenegro and Albania. Approximately 65% of the lake's surface area belongs to Montenegro, while around 35% belongs to Albania. The lake's water level also varies seasonally from 4.7 to 9.8 metres (15 to 32 ft) above sea level. The lake extends northwest to southeast, and it is approximately 44 km (27 miles) long.

The Buna River connects the lake with the Adriatic Sea, and the Drin River provides a link with Lake Ohrid. The lake is a cryptodepression, filled by the river Morača and drained into the Adriatic by the 41 km (25 mi) long Buna (Serbo-Croatian: Bojana), which forms the international border on the lower half of its length. The largest inflow is from the Morača, which provides about 62% of the lake's water. Total drainage area is 5,490 km^{2} (2,120 sq mi).

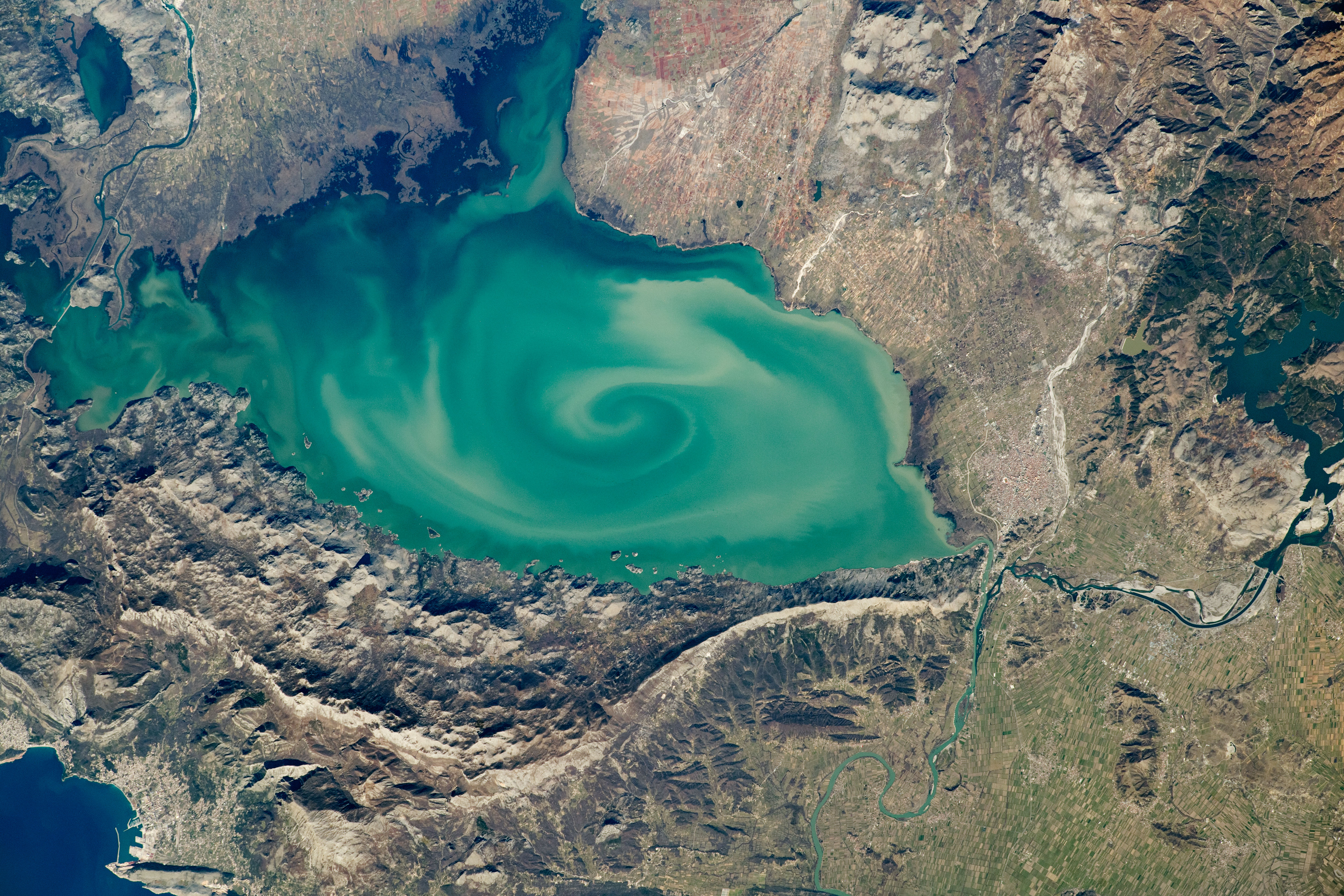
Satellite image of the lake in 2020 Courtesy: NASA's Earth Observatory

There are additionally some fresh water sources at the lake bottom. A characteristic feature of Lake Skadar's water balance is the high inflow from a number of temporary and permanent karst springs, some of which are sublacustrine in cryptodepressions (known as an oko). The southern and southwestern sides of the lake are rocky, barren and steep, having bays in which the sublacustrine springs are usually to be found. On the northern side there is an enormous inundated area, the boundaries of which change as water levels fluctuate.

Some small islands like Beška, with two churches on it and Grmožur, a former fortress and prison can be found on the southwestern side of the lake.

The climate type is hot-summer Mediterranean climate with dry summers (Csa), under Köppen climate classification.

The Montenegrin part of the lake and its surrounding area were declared a national park in 1983. Additionally, the wine-growing region known as the Skadar Lake Basin is situated in the broader area around the lake on the Montenegrin side. The Albanian part has been designated as a Managed Nature Reserve. In 1996, by Ramsar Convention on Wetlands, it was included in the Ramsar list of wetlands of international importance. Near the mouth of Rijeka Crnojevića, 11 m (36 ft) below the surface of the water there is a well-preserved wreck of the steamboat Skanderbeg sunk by partisans in 1942, during the Second World War.

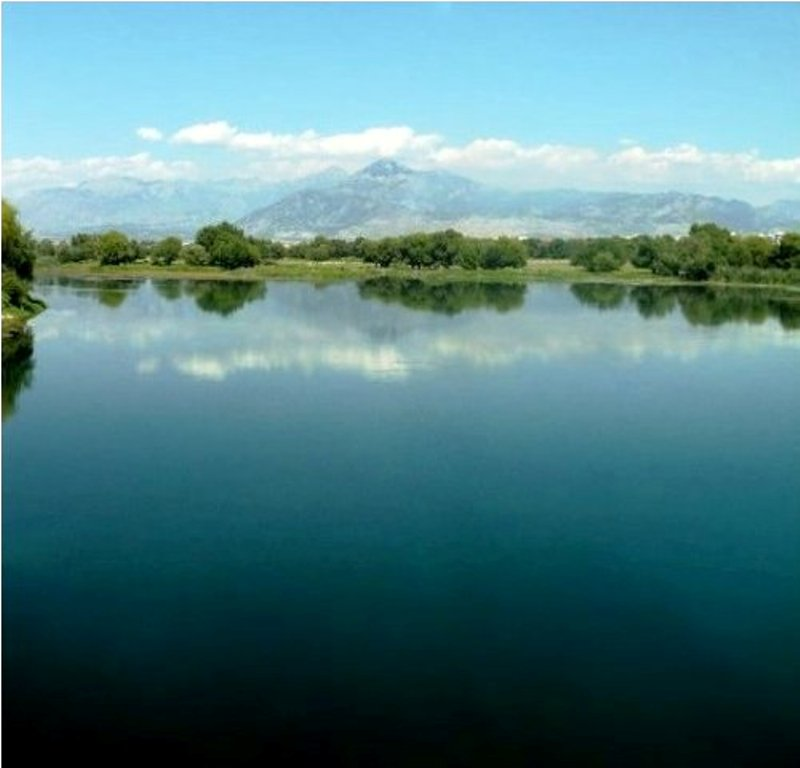
View of the lake, Albania

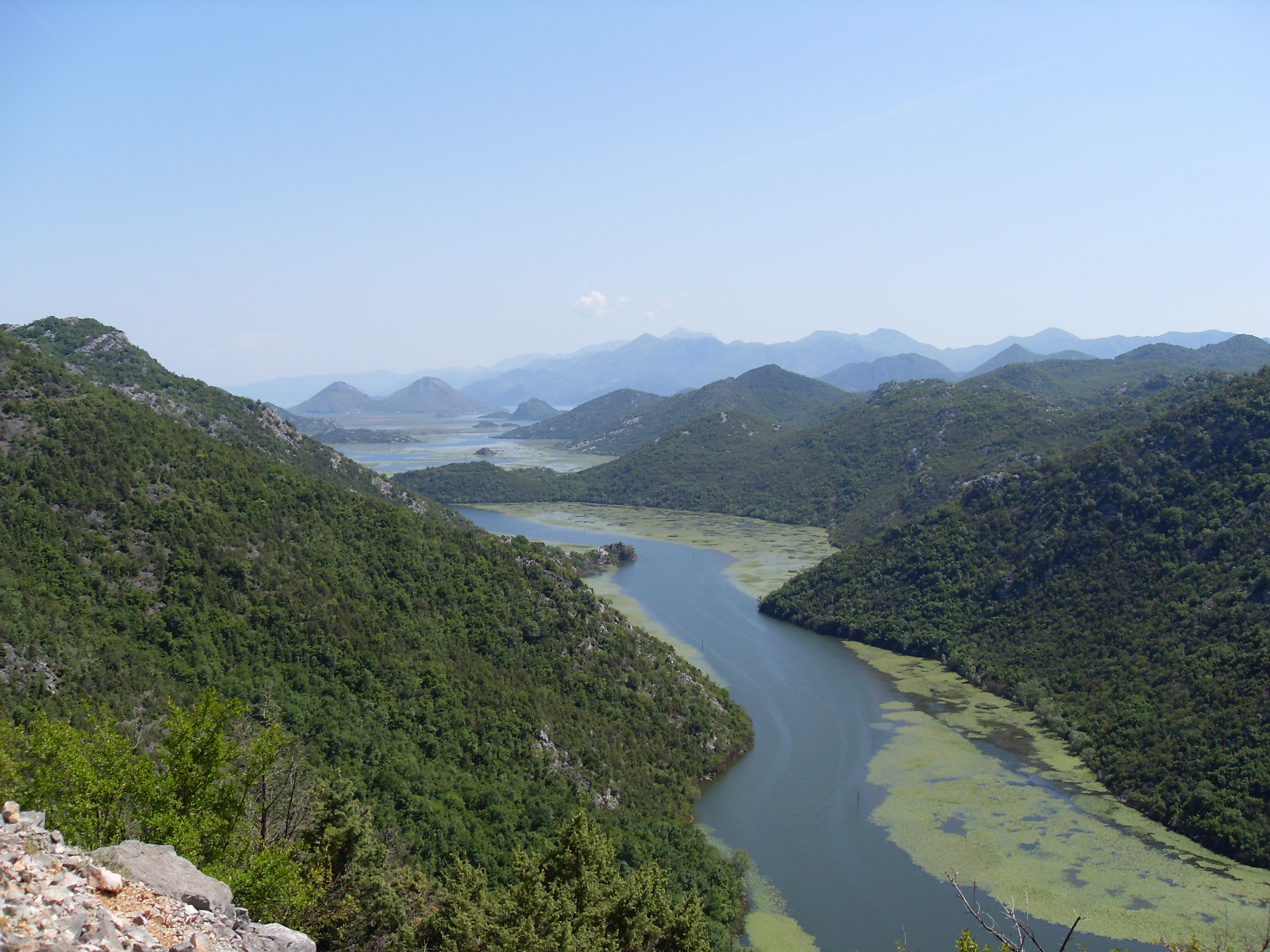
Western part of the lake near Rijeka Crnojevića, Montenegro

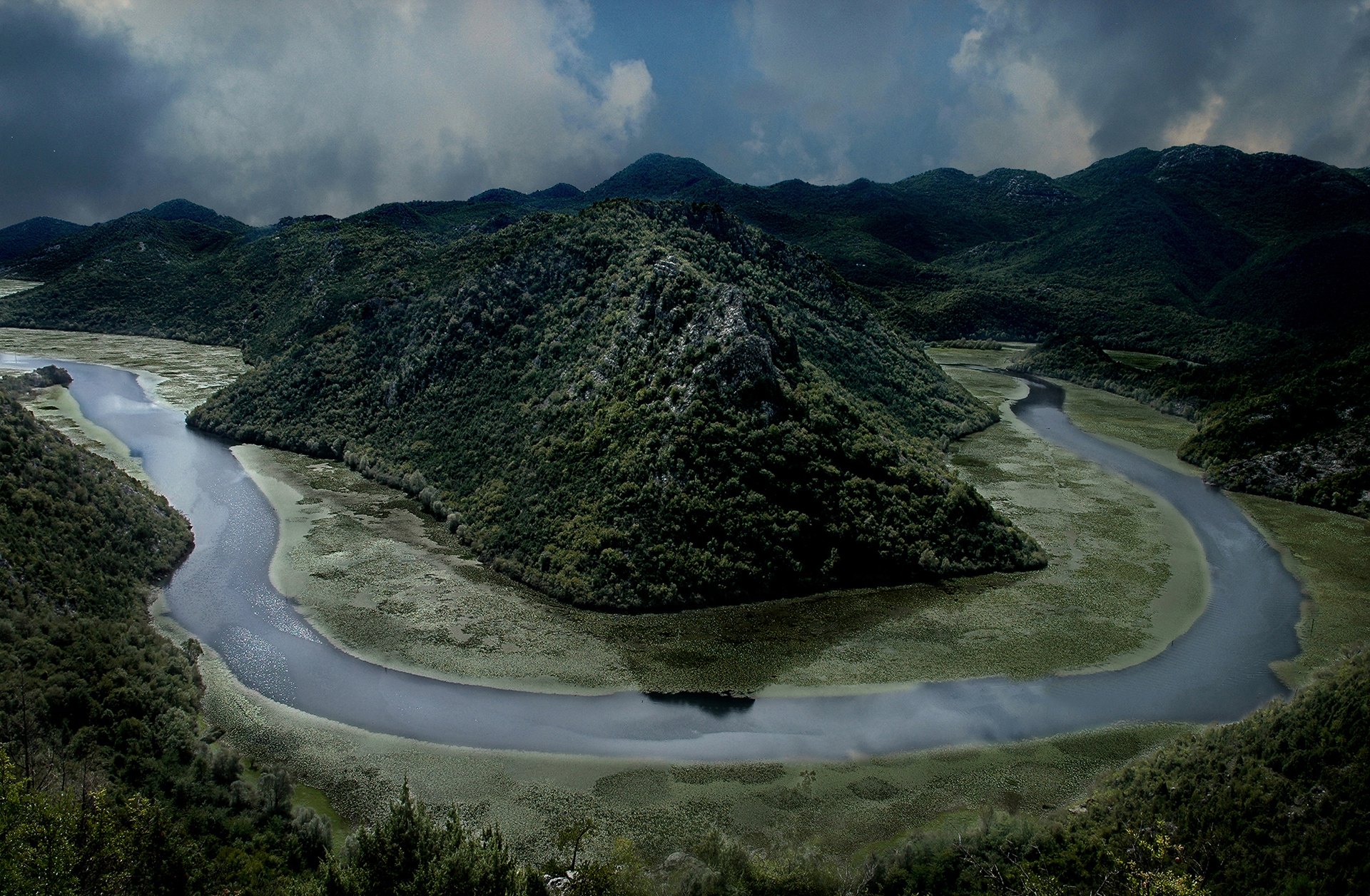
Horseshoe bend in the northwest corner

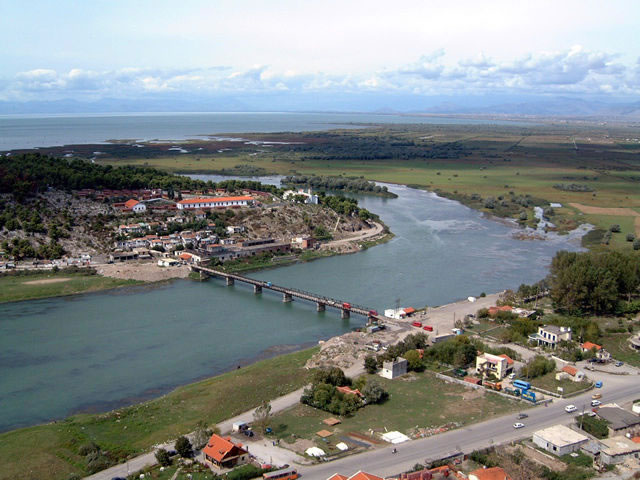
Outflow at Shkodër in Albania

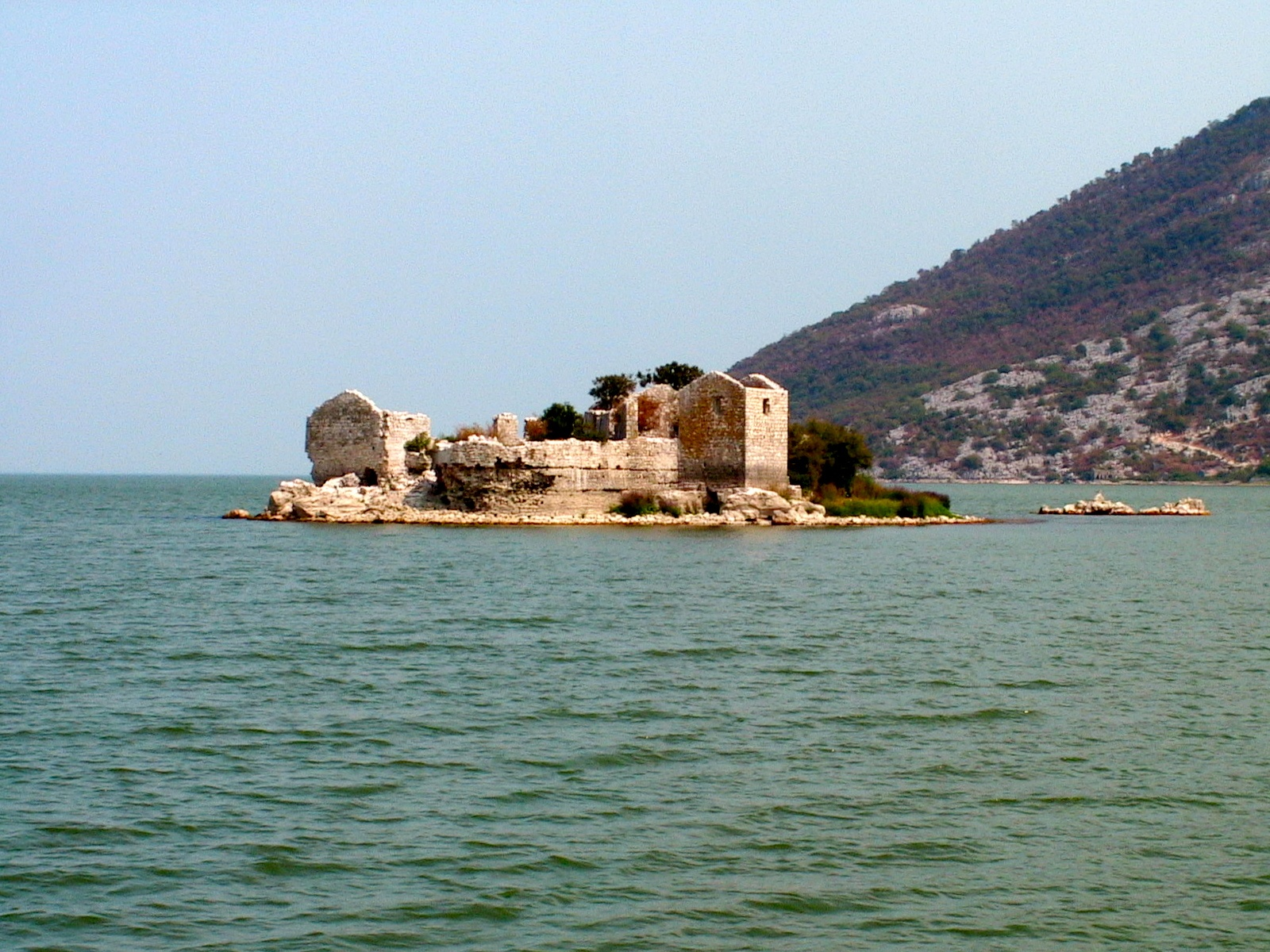
Fortress Grmožur in Lake Skadar, Montenegro

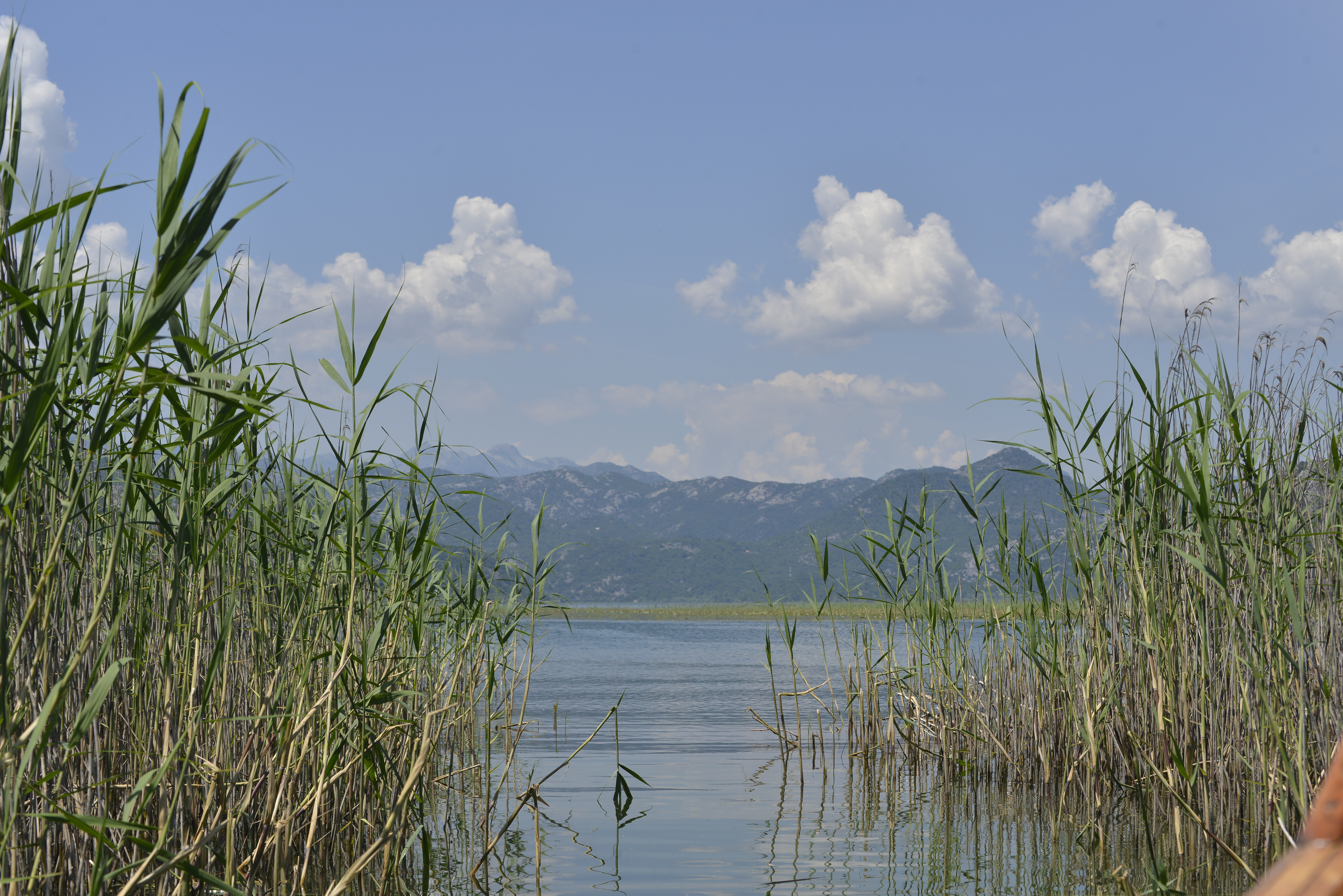
Lake Skadar, Montenegro

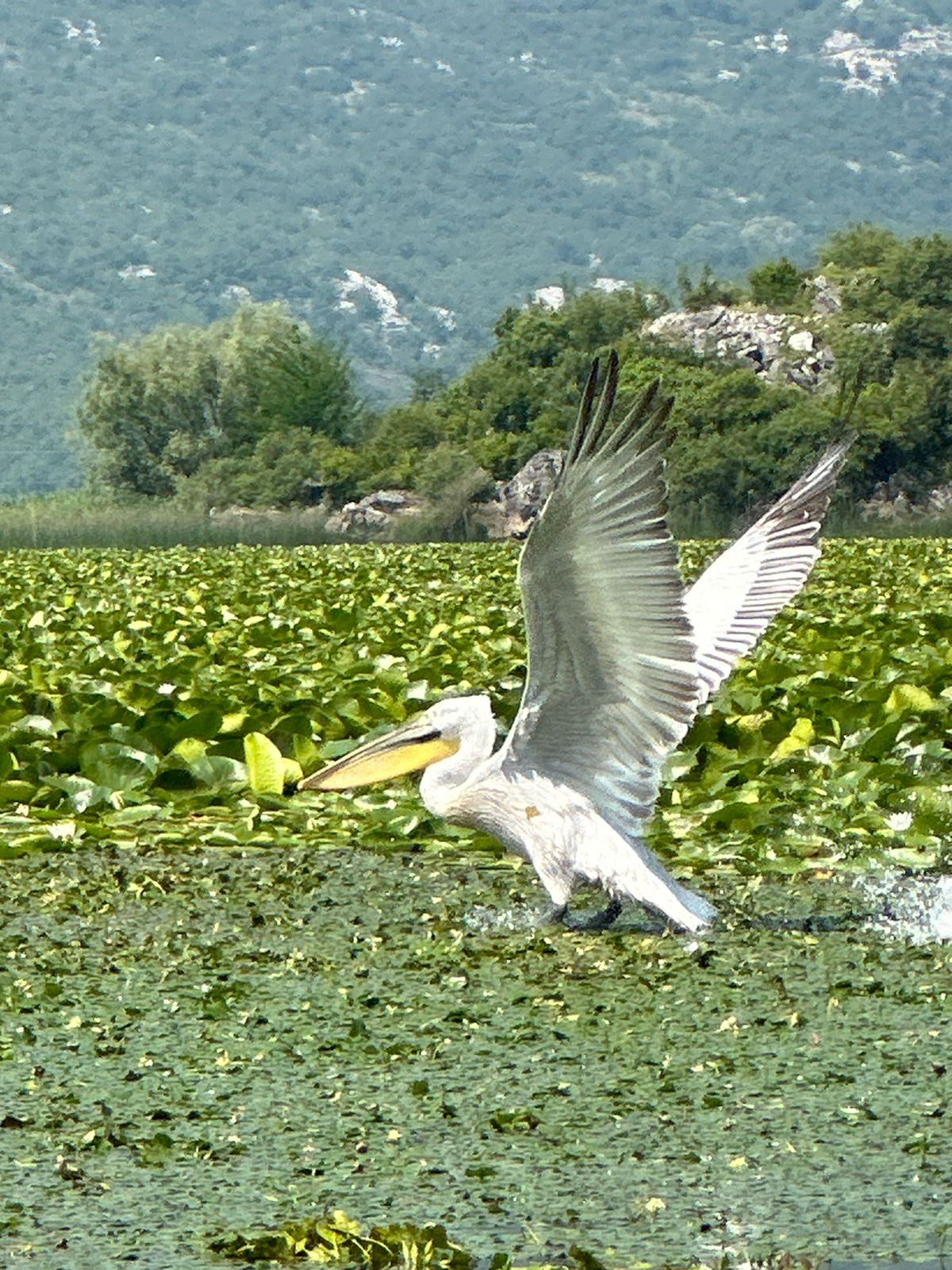
Dalmatian Pelican at Lake Skadar

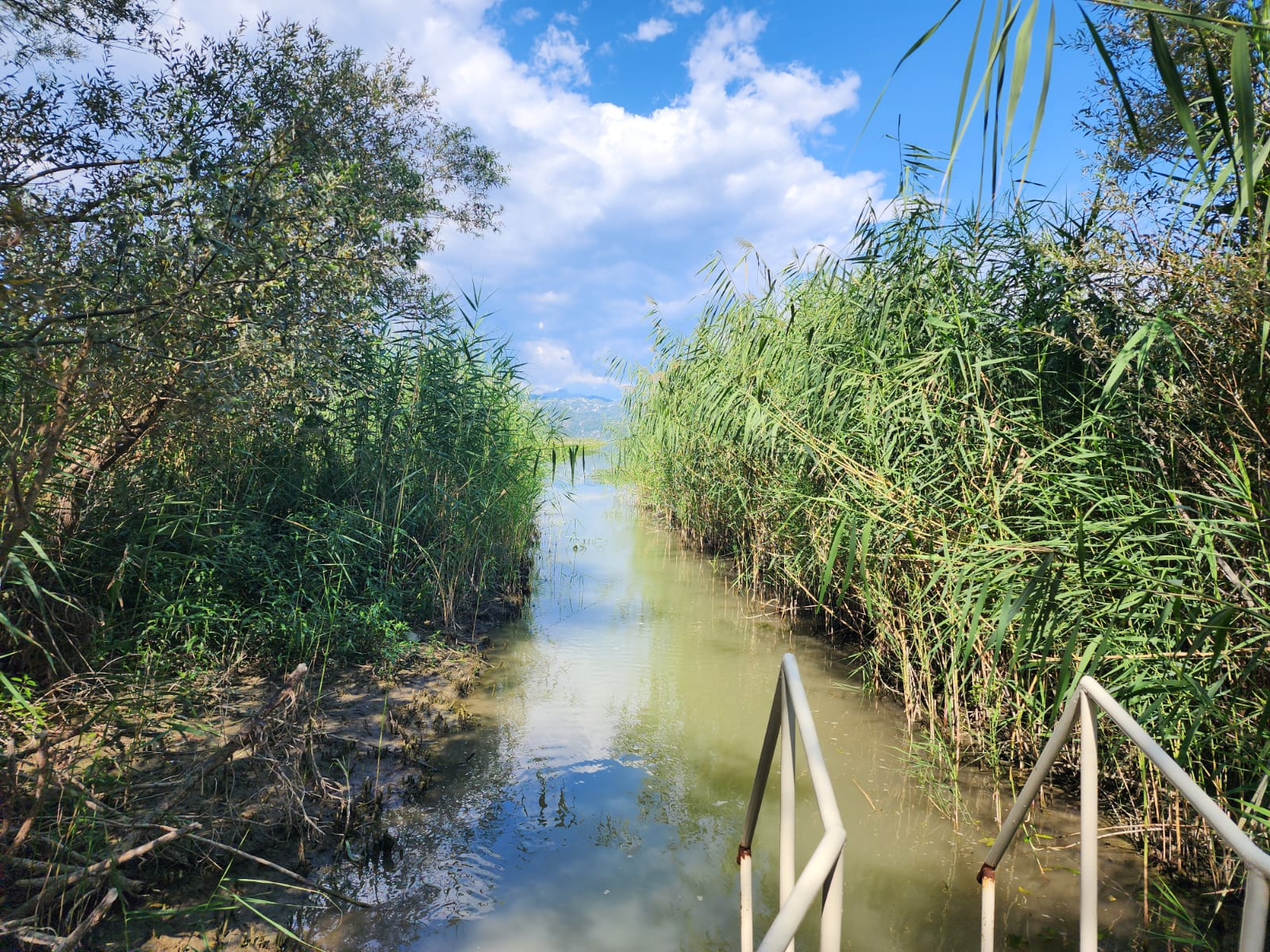

=== Vitoja Spring ===
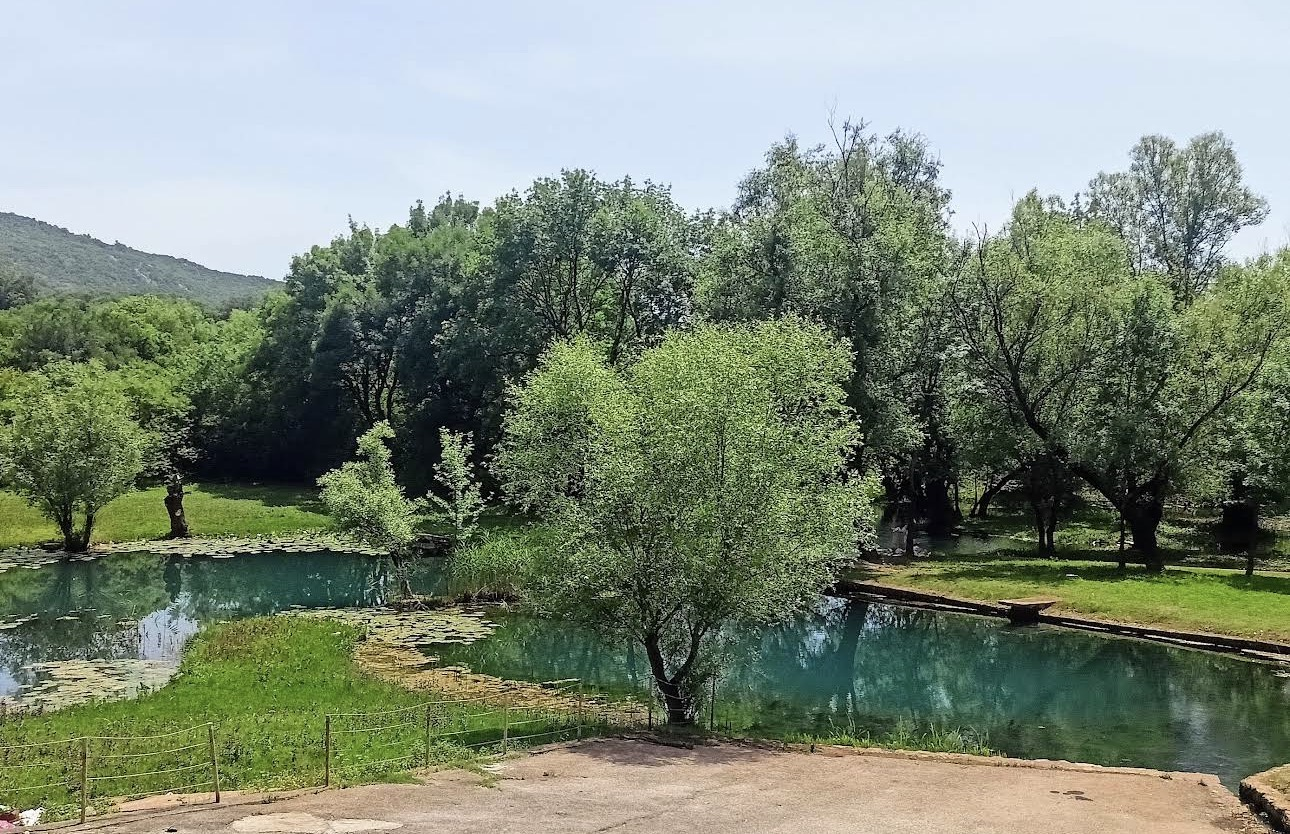
Picture of the Vitoja Spring

Vitoja Spring is a large karst spring system on the northeastern shore of the lake, near the settlement of Hasanoj and close to the Božaj border crossing with Albania.

The spring is part of the hydrological system feeding the lake. The lake receives significant inflow from over 200 temporary and permanent karst springs, many of which are sublacustrine (under the lake surface). The Vitoja system consists of one main spring that feeds into two conjoined small spring lakes, along with several sublacustrine spring zones. An additional five side springs are located within 150 meters west of the main spring. During periods of high water, the entire spring system becomes submerged under the lake level. The springs emerge at the geological boundary between massive limestone and the alluvial deposits of Lake Skadar.

== Geology ==
Lake Skadar is presumably an ancient lake, although it is a relatively young ancient lake.

Most authors agree that the Lake Skadar basin is of tectonic origin which had been formed due to the complex folding and faulting within north eastern wing of Old Montenegro anticlinorium (High Karst Zone). These movements took place during the Cenozoic period. The lake basin has been formed as the result of sinking of blocks in the Neogene period or even in Paleogene. In the Miocene and the Pliocene marine conditions prevailed in the Zeta Plain, which was sunk at the beginning of the upper Miocene, and that the sea inundated this plain up to Podgorica during the Pliocene. Radoman (1985) pointed out that sea must have destroyed all the freshwater populations on this plane and in the Lake Skadar area. The connection of Lake Skadar with the sea was interrupted during the younger Pliocene. The question of the origin of its water is of particular interest for biologists as these waters may have provided its first species and been the basis for its present high degree of endemism.

== Fauna ==
The Lake Skadar system is a hotspot of freshwater biodiversity and harbors a highly diverse mollusc fauna.

Lake Skadar is one of the largest bird reserves in Europe, having 270 bird species, among which are some of the last pelicans in Europe, and thus popular with birders. The lake also contains habitats of seagulls and herons. It has been recognised as an Important Bird Area (IBA) by BirdLife International.

It is abundant in fish, especially in carp, bleak and eel. Of the 34 native fish species, 7 are endemic to Lake Skadar.

At the scale of Lake Skadar, about 31% of freshwater snails (12 out of 39 species sampled in the lake) are endemic. At the scale of the Lake Skadar basin, 38% (19 species) of the total freshwater gastropod fauna appear to be endemic. There were reliably recorded 50 species of freshwater snails from the Lake Skadar basin. The index of freshwater gastropod endemism is 0.478. With this relatively high value, Lake Skadar exceeds Lake Malawi and Lake Titicaca. Lake Skadar is inhabited by five species of Bithynia and it is a hot spot of Bithynia evolution.

There are 17 amphipod species for the Lake Skadar watershed, 10 of them being endemic (mainly from the subterranean habitat).

The small range of many endemic species living in the Lake Skadar system together with ever increasing human pressure make its fauna particularly vulnerable. This becomes even more important in light of ongoing eutrophication, water pollution and sand and gravel exploration activities in the lake and its basin. Research of the phytoplankton community and chlorophyll-based trophic state indices show that the lake is on a betamesosaprobic level of saprobity, which means moderately polluted with organic compounds. Effects of human-induced environmental changes are especially evident for sublacustrine springs, with eutrophication and use for water supply (e.g., sublacustrine spring Karuč) being the most serious threats.

The 2011 IUCN Red List of Threatened Species includes 21 endemic species from the Lake Skadar basin.

Vitoja Spring is notable for its diverse freshwater mollusc fauna, including several species that are endemic to the Lake Skadar basin. Researches have documented the following species of gastropods from the area:

- Theodoxus fluviatilis
- Vinodolia scutarica
- Vinodolia matjasici
- Bosnidilhia vreloana
- Islamia montenegrina
- Bracenica vitojaensis
- Plagigeyeria zetaprotogona
- Lanzaia pesici
- Pyrgula annulata
- Armiger crista
- Gyraulus parvus

Notably, the species Islamia montenegrina, Bracenica vitojaensis, and Lanzaia pesici were described as new to science based largely on specimens from this spring.

== Tourism ==
Located roughly 5 km from the city of Tuzi, Vitoja is promoted as a local recreational destination. It is known for its pure, cold, and clear water. The area features facilities for picnics and barbecues, a summer stage used for traditional festivals and cultural events, and opportunities for hiking and relaxation in a natural setting.

== Cultural impact ==
Radio Skadar, a radio station based in Podgorica, is named after Lake Skadar.

== See also ==
- Shaqari Island
