= National Agency of Protected Areas (Albania) =

Government agency of Albania

- Agjencia Kombëtare e Zonave të Mbrojtura
- Logo of AKZM

Agency overview
- Formed: February 4, 2015
- Preceding agency: Forestry Police
- Jurisdiction: Albanian Government
- Headquarters: Tirana
- Employees: 224
- Minister responsible: Mirela Kumbaro, Minister of Tourism and Environment
- Agency executive: Daniel Pirushi, General Director
- Parent department: Ministry of Tourism and Environment
- Website: akzm.gov.al

The National Agency of Protected Areas (Albanian: Agjencia Kombëtare e Zonave të Mbrojtura, abbreviated AKZM) is a government agency in Albania. Its main duties are focused on the management, protection, development, expansion and operation of the protected areas in the country, which today account for about 21.3% of the territory of Albania. AKZM was established on February 4, 2015, and took many of the functions and duties of former local Forestry Police which was abolished. The newly created local Protected Areas Administrations (AdZM) on a county level are: AdZM Tiranë, AdZM Durrës, AdZM Shkodër, AdZM Kukës, AdZM Dibër, AdZM Lezhë, AdZM Elbasan, AdZM Berat, AdZM Fier, AdZM Korçë, AdZM Vlorë, AdZM Gjirokastër.

== Organization and Mission ==
The agency is under the authority of the Minister of Tourism and Environment. It specializes in defending Albanian agroforestry heritage, safeguarding the environment and landscape. It complied with the fulfillment of security services as well as the control of the territory, with particular reference to rural and mountainous areas.

The AKZM have as primary role to safeguarding the wooded areas, but also have other numerous and varied institutional tasks, which is part of a wider context of protection of the environment and the territory, human health, animal protection, flora and landscaping, conservation biodiversity. It is also charged to protect the Albanian National Parks; marine protected areas and protected areas.

Some of important duties of the AKZM are:

- Controls the implementation of the law on forests, pastures, protected areas, wild flora and fauna, hunting activities and other activities carried out in the national forest fund by private and public entities, and proposes the revocation of licenses when subjects act in violation of the relevant law;
- Prevents, detects and fights damage, occupation, abuse, alienation, desecration and degradation of forests and forest land, violation of uncontrolled interventions in the forestry fund and in the natural environment;
- Organizes work on prevention and extinction of fires on protected areas, in cooperation with Fire and Rescue service and General Directorate of Civil Emergencies;
- Prevents and takes measures in the cases of illegal exploitation and trading of wood material, crime in the forestry sector, pastures, protected areas and forests with special function, wild flora and fauna, medicinal, aromatic and ethereal herbs, forest and non-forest products of national forests fund, as well as any other activity contrary to the law;

== See also ==
- Protected areas of Albania
