= Gashi Valley =

Protected area in Albania

- Lugina e Gashit
- IUCN category Ia (strict nature reserve)
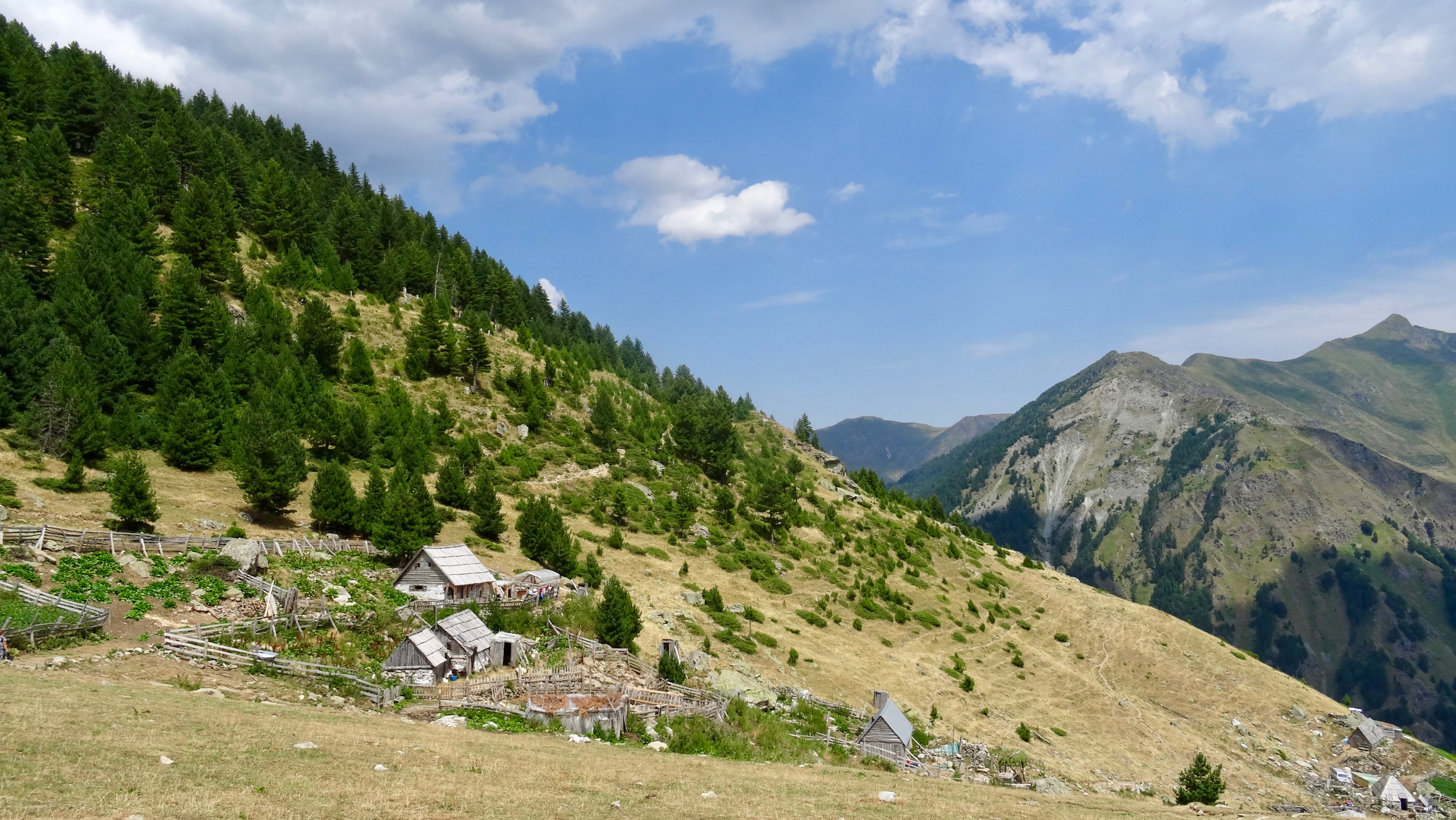
- Alpine pasture of Balçina e Luzhës

- Location within Albania Location within Europe
- Location: Kukës County
- Nearest town: Tropojë
- Coordinates: 42°25′36″N 20°05′45″E
- Area: 3,000 hectares (30 km^{2})
- Governing body: National Agency of Protected Areas

UNESCO World Heritage Site
- Official name: Primeval Beech Forests of the Carpathians
- Type: Natural
- Criteria: ix
- Designated: 7 July 2017

Gashi Valley (Albanian: Lugina e Gashit) is a strict nature reserve located in northern Albania. Along with Rrajcë, it forms the transnational Ancient and Primeval Beech Forests of the Carpathians and Other Regions of Europe, encompassing 94 nature sites, in 18 European countries.

== Geology ==
Spanning 3,000 hectares (30 km^{2}) and situated in the basin of the Gashi River, the valley is characterized by a rugged and fragmented alpine terrain made up of magmatic and limestone formations. Other prominent features of the valley include glacial formations such as cirques, ridges and rapids. The region has a mountainous Continental climate with harsh winters and cool summers, abundant clean waters, and glacial lakes formed in cirques and morainic deposits.

== Biodiversity ==
The valley is host to a diverse range of plant and animal life, including beech forests (with a mix of spruce, mountain maple, cypress, hornbeam), alpine meadows (blueberries are extensively cultivated), many endemic and subendemic plants, and protected mammals such as the brown bear, racoon, goat, wild boar, roe deer, etc.

== Culture ==
The Gashi valley region is rich in cultural heritage, with many symbolisms from, Eposi i Kreshnikëve, Muji and the mountain fairy, the legend of Mic Sokoli and others. The region is recognized for its folklore, specifically the famous Tropojë Dance (Albanian: Vallja e Tropojës), which is a candidate for inclusion in UNESCO's Intangible Cultural Heritage tentative list. Worthy of mention are the many ethnographic values in traditional clothing, most notably the Xhubleta, an undulating, bell-shaped folk skirt, hung on the shoulders using two straps, worn by local women since at least the 17th century.

== See also ==
- Protected areas of Albania
- World Heritage Sites in Albania
