= Lake Shkodër Nature Reserve =

Protected area and a tourist attraction in Albania

- IUCN category IV (habitat/species management area)
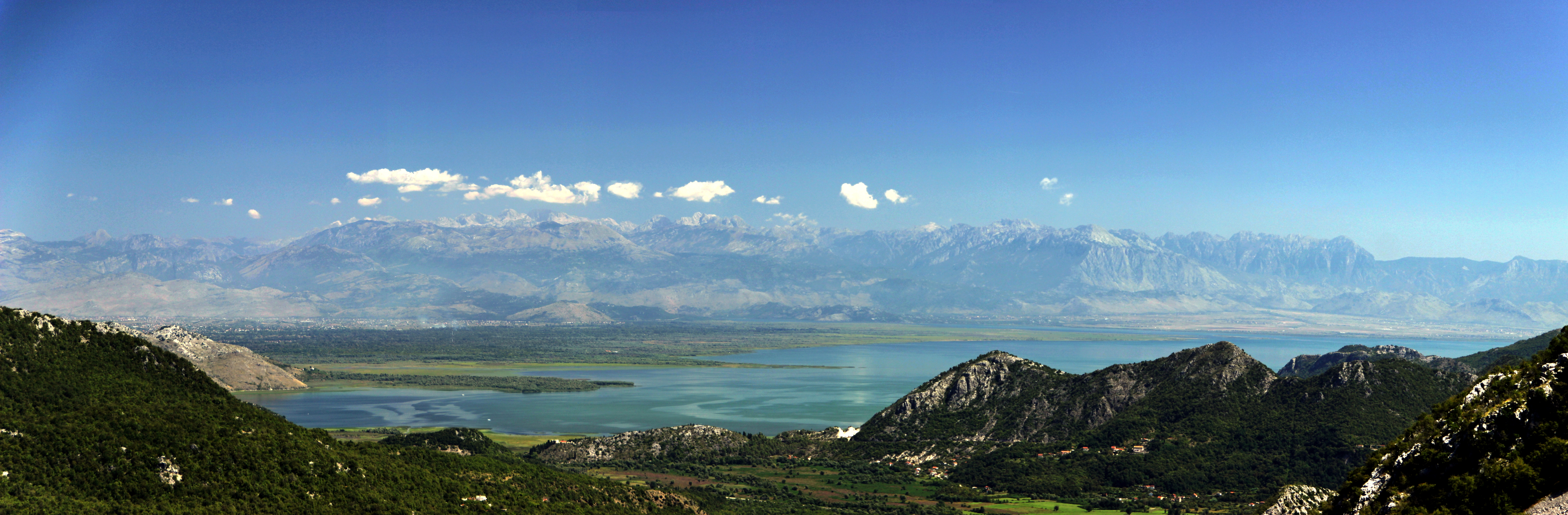
- View across the Lake of Shkodër and the Albanian Alps in the background.

- Location within Albania Location within Europe
- Location: Shkodër District
- Nearest city: Shkodër
- Coordinates: 42°04′18″N 19°29′30″E
- Area: 26,535 hectares (265.35 km^{2})
- Established: 2 November 2005
- Governing body: Ministry of Environment

The Lake Shkodër Nature Reserve (Albanian: Rezervat Natyror i Menaxhuar Liqeni i Shkodrës) is a nature reserve in northwestern Albania. The protected area encompasses the Albanian segment of Lake Skadar (14,900 ha) and the adjoining Buna River and plain (11,635 ha), including water and land areas.

== See also ==
- Protected areas of Albania
- Geography of Albania
- Biodiversity of Albania
