= Bogovë Nature Park =

Protected area and a tourist attraction in Albania

- IUCN category IV (habitat/species management area)
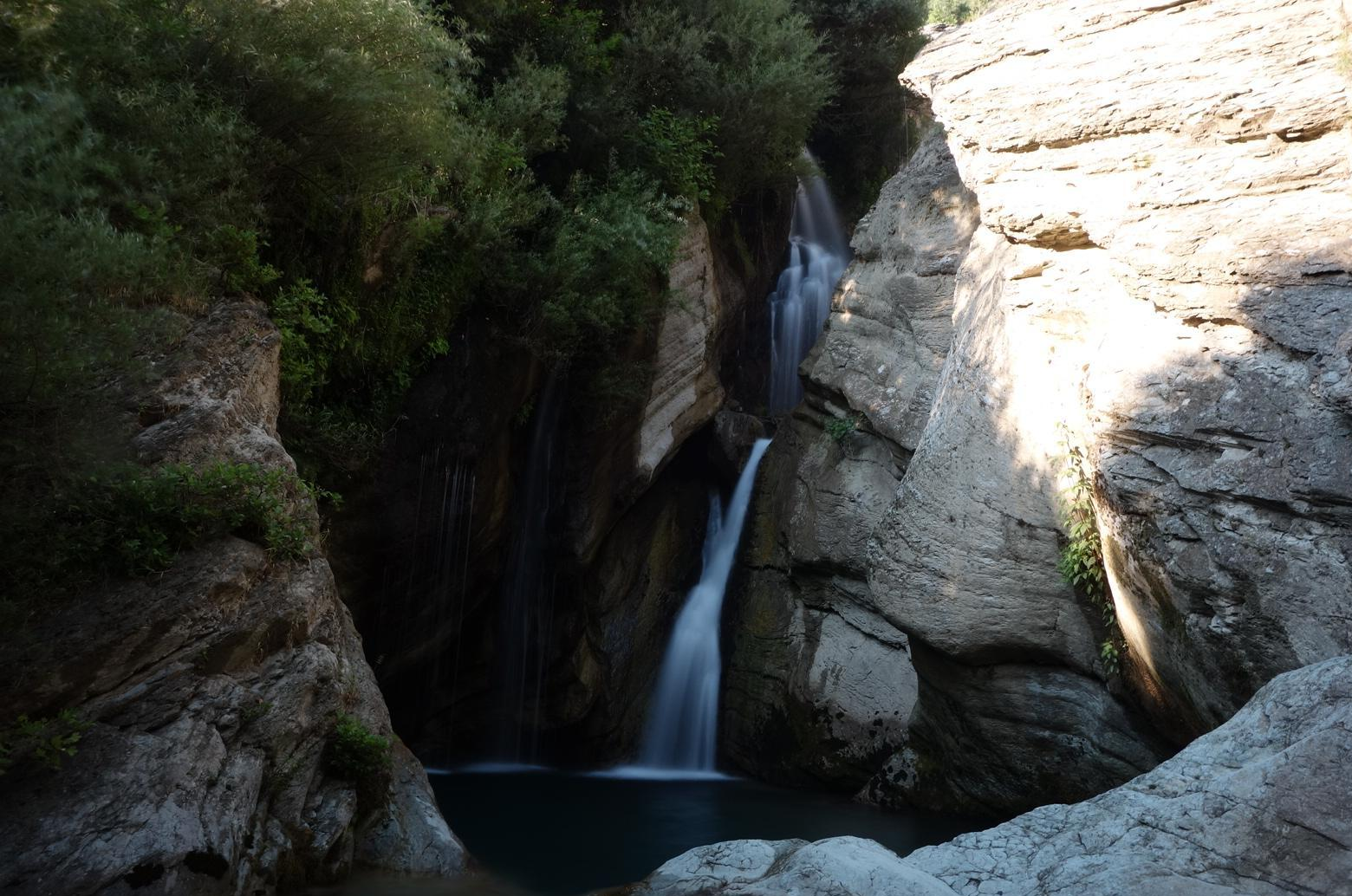
- Bogovë Nature Park

- Location within Albania Location within Europe
- Location: Albania
- Nearest city: Berat
- Coordinates: 40°33′45.05″N 20°7′58.69″E
- Area: 330 ha (3.3 km^{2})
- Established: 1977
- Governing body: Ministry of Environment

Bogovë Nature Park (Albanian: Parku Natyror i Bogovës) is a nature park in southern Albania, spanning an area of 3.3 km^{2} (1.3 sq mi). It was established in 1977 to protect several ecosystems and biodiversity of national importance. The nature park of Bogovë falls inside the Pindus Mountains mixed forests terrestrial ecoregion of the Palearctic Mediterranean forests, woodlands, and scrub biome.

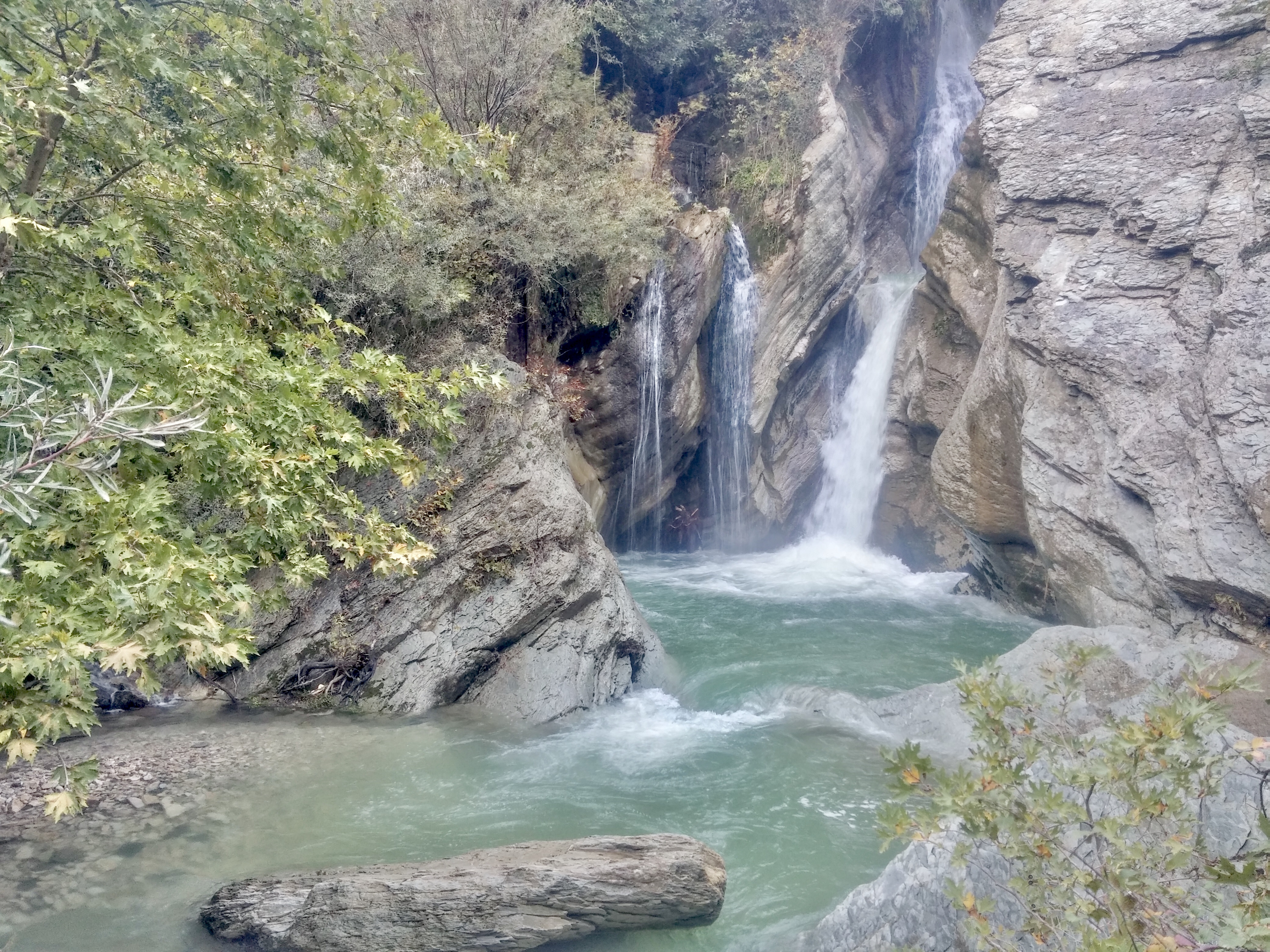
Bogovë Waterfalls

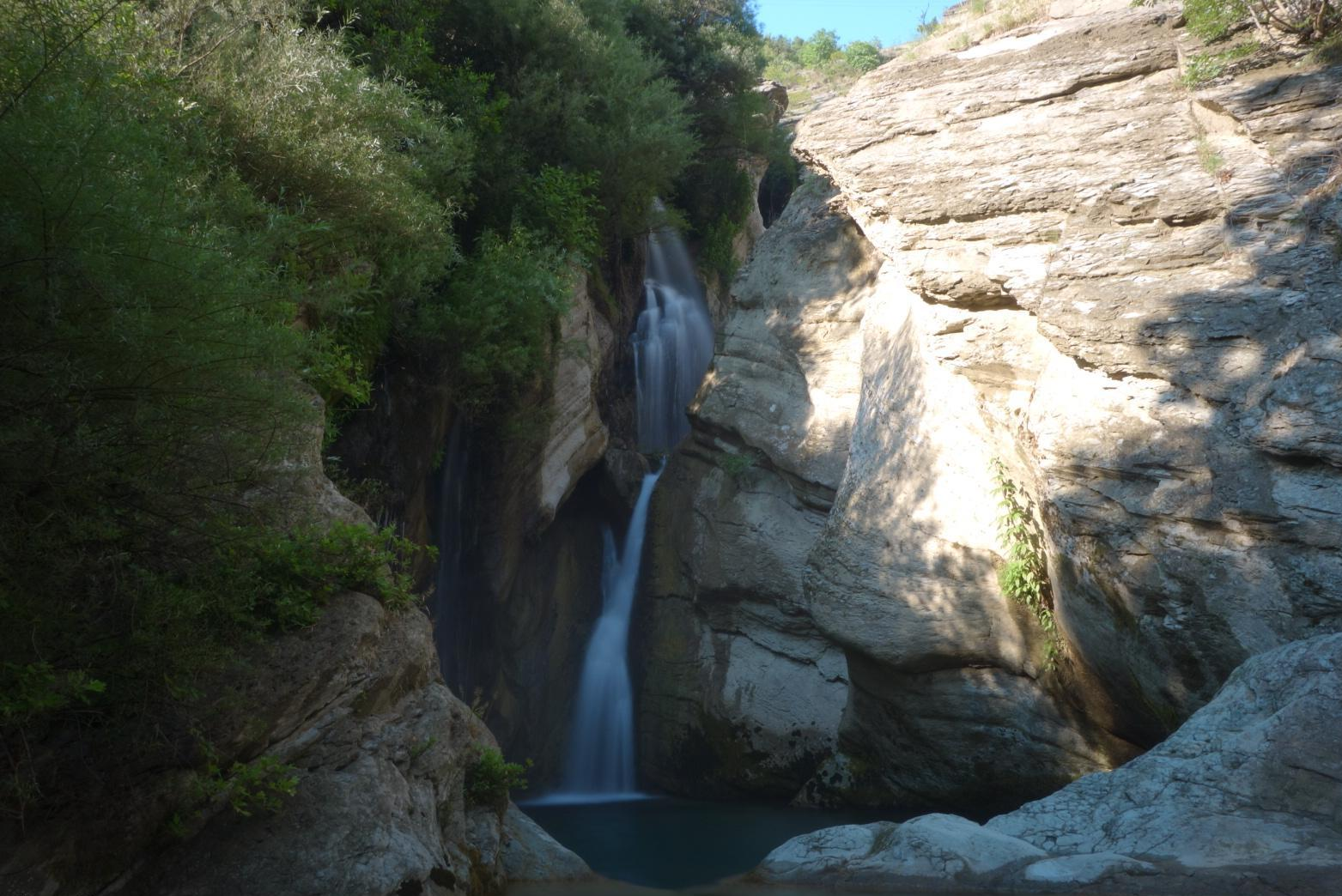
Bogovë Waterfalls

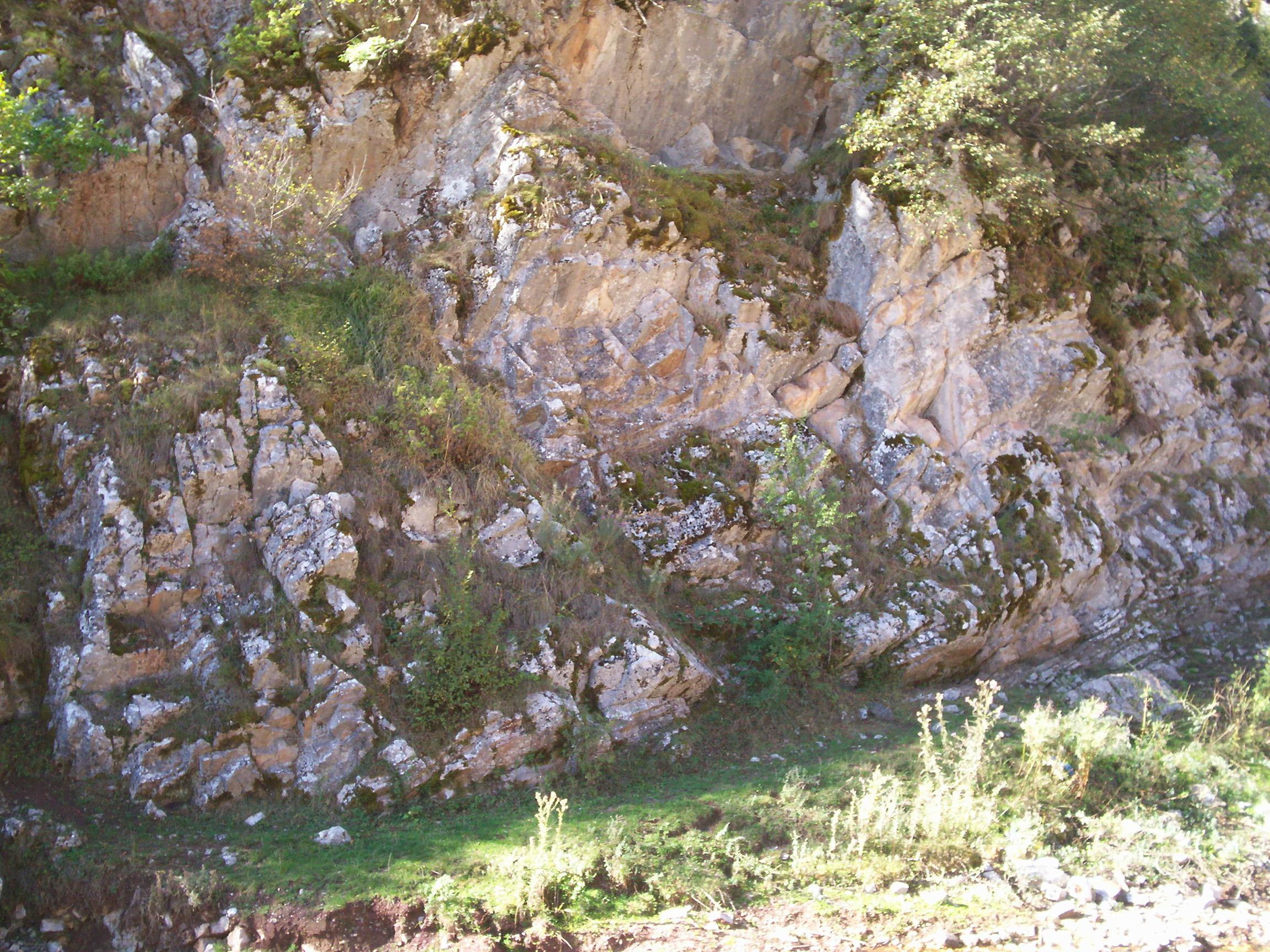
Limestone hill

== See also ==
- Protected areas of Albania
- Geography of Albania
- Biodiversity of Albania
