= Skanderbeg (steamboat) =

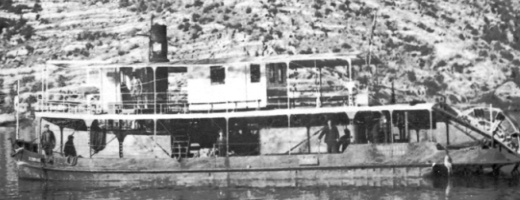
- Skanderbeg

History
- Name: Skanderbeg
- Owner: (Austria-Hungary) Lloyd, Trieste; (Principality of Albania) Tef Curani, agent of Lloyd at Shkoder; (Kingdom of Italy) Lloyd Triestino, Trieste; (Kingdom of Yugoslavia) Jadransko-Skadarska Plovidba, Lipovik (1924–1942); (Kingdom of Italy) Royal Italian Army; (Democratic Federal Yugoslavia) Yugoslav Partisans
- Route: Rijeka Crnojevića — Shkoder (1924–1942)
- Builder: Trieste
- Completed: 1914 or 1916
- In service: 1914–1942
- Fate: Sunk by Yugoslav Partisans in Skadar Lake

General characteristics
- Type: Paddle steamer
- Tonnage: 20 t
- Displacement: 31/41 t
- Length: 21.10 m (69.2 ft)
- Beam: 5.20 m (17.1 ft)
- Height: 1.30 m (4 ft 3 in)
- Installed power: 80 HP
- Crew: 6

The paddle steamer Skanderbeg was used for transport of the goods and passengers mostly on the Skadar Lake in Montenegro in the first half of the 20th century. It was built in Trieste in 1914 or 1916. Skanderbeg's first owner was Lloyd's office in Trieste (then in Austria-Hungary). The ownership over Skanderbeg was transferred to Lloyd's office in Shkoder (its agent Tef Curani). When Italy took control over Trieste the ownership was transferred to Lloyd Triestino in Trieste. In 1924 Yugoslav a shipping company from Cetinje bought Skanderbeg to use it for transport of the goods and passengers over the Skadar Lake. Its route was between Rijeka Crnojevića and Shkoder. In April 1941, after the Axis occupied Yugoslavia during the Second World War, Skanderbeg was confiscated by Italian authorities, together with all boats on Skadar Lake. On 12 February 1942 Skanderbeg was captured and sunk by Yugoslav Partisans who scuttled it. Its wreck is in good condition, 11 m (36 ft) below the surface of the water and can be seen during low water levels.

== Characteristics ==
Skanderbeg was 21.10 m (69.2 ft) long. Its beam was 5.20 m (17.1 ft) and its height was 1.30 m (4 ft 3 in). Skanderbeg had a crew of 6 people. Its displacement was 31 t (light) or 41 t (loaded).

== History ==
According to Dinko Franetović, Skanderbeg was completed in 1916 in Trieste, Italy (then Austria-Hungary). It was first owned by Lloyd in Trieste (then Austria-Hungary), Lloyd's agent in Shkoder (Tef Curani) and by Lloyd Triestino in Italian-held Trieste. In 1924 Skanderbeg was bought by Jadransko-Skadarska Plovidba, founded in Cetinje by the Serbian-Albanian bank in 1920. Its seat was in Lipovik (port near Rijeka Crnojevića). Skanderbeg was used for transport of goods and passengers between Rijeka Crnojevića and Shkoder. In April 1941 all boats of Jadransko-Skadarska Plovidba were confiscated by the Italians who occupied this part of the Kingdom of Yugoslavia.

=== Partisan action and aftermath ===
On 12 February 1942 Yugoslav Partisans ("Carev Laz" battalion of Lovćen detachment and part of battalion "13 July") attacked Skanderbeg while it was sailing on the Skadar Lake, at the mouth of Rijeka Crnojevića. Partisans killed three Italian soldiers and took the remaining nine as prisoners. They also released from captivity fifteen prisoners who were transported by Skanderbeg. One prisoner was killed in the attack. The Partisans scuttled the ship.

The following month, the Italian Navy deployed the minesweeper Vigilante, armed with a 76mm naval gun, and two minor naval units mounting machine guns to Skadar Lake. On 9 March, Vigilante engaged and sank three Partisan motorboats while patrolling the lake. Two militants were captured and shot by the Italians. Other Italian authors reported that this action involved a large Partisan vessel sunk when its crew refused to submit to the Italian minesweeper. In April the master of Skanderbeg was also captured by Italian forces and executed under the charge of collaboration with the rebels.

The wreck of Skanderbeg is still where it sank, 11 m (36 ft) below the surface of the water. The wreck can be seen from the surface during the low water level.
