= Shaqari Islet =

Island in Albania

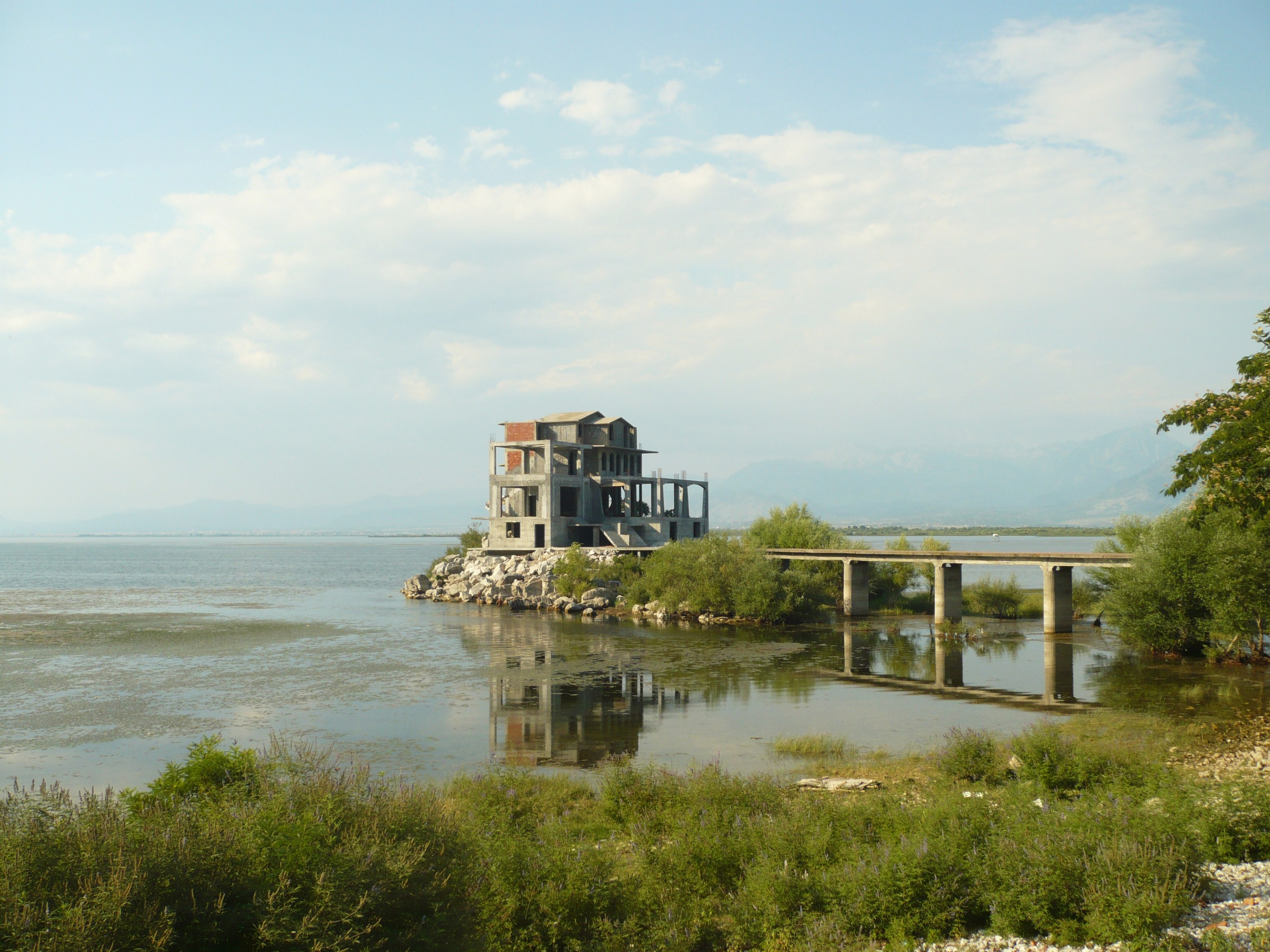
- View of Shaqari Islet

- Location within Albania

Geography
- Location: Lake Shkodër
- Coordinates: 42°03′33.99″N 19°27′42.99″E
- Highest elevation: 1 m (3 ft)

Administration
- Albania
- County: Shkodër County
- Village: Shirokë

Shaqarí Islet (Albanian: Ishulli i Shaqarisë) is a small islet found in northern Albania in Lake Skadar.

It is very small and is situated just opposite the village of Shiroka which stands on the largest lake in the Balkans. The island is connected to Shiroka by a bridge and there is a building on the island.
