= Medal for Service in Public Order =

State decoration of the Republic of Albania

- Native name: Medalja e Shërbimit të Rendit Publik
- Type: State medal
- Awarded for: Contributions to combating crime and protecting life, public order and security.
- Country: Albania
- Presented by: Minister of Interior
- Eligibility: Albanian and foreign citizens
- Status: Currently constituted
- Established: 28 March 2024
- Ribbon bar

The Medal for Service in Public Order (Albanian: Medalja e Shërbimit të Rendit Publik; MSHRP) is an Albanian state decoration conferred on Albanian and foreign citizens in recognition of distinguished contributions to public order and security. The medal is awarded in three grades: gold, silver and bronze.

== Award criteria ==
The medal is conferred on Albanian and foreign citizens in recognition of contributions to combating crime, protecting life, maintaining public order and security, safeguarding and administering property and managing emergency situations.

It may also be awarded for courage and bravery in the performance of duties and responsibilities prescribed by legislation governing public order and security.

== Grades ==
The Medal for Service in Public Order consists of three grades, arranged in descending order of precedence:

- Gold (Albanian: Medalja e Artë e Shërbimit të Rendit Publik)
- Silver (Albanian: Medalja e Argjendtë e Shërbimit të Rendit Publik)
- Bronze (Albanian: Medalja e Bronztë e Shërbimit të Rendit Publik)

== Insignia ==
The medal is modelled on decorations for uniformed personnel used in several European countries. Its central motif is a double-headed eagle, based on the design commonly used in the insignia of the Albanian State Police. The eagle is accompanied by a sword, symbolising the force of law and a sceptre of justice, representing its enforcement. Below the design is the inscription Për Shërbim në Rendin Publik ("For Service in Public Order").

The medal retains the same basic design across its three grades, which are distinguished by gold, silver and bronze finishes.

== See also ==
- Orders, decorations, and medals of Albania
- Albanian State Police
