= List of Ramsar sites in Albania =

This is a list of wetlands in Albania which have been designated by the Ramsar Convention as sites of international importance.

== List of sites ==
Name	Image	Designated	Site no.	Area	Location
Lake Prespa		13 June 2013	2151	15,119 hectares (151.19 km^{2})	List of Ramsar sites in Albania is located in Albania
Butrint		28 March 2003	1290	13,500 hectares (135 km^{2})	List of Ramsar sites in Albania is located in Albania
Karavasta Lagoon		29 November 1995	781	20,000 hectares (200 km^{2})	List of Ramsar sites in Albania is located in Albania
Lake Shkodër / River Buna		2 February 2006	1598	49,562 hectares (495.62 km^{2})	List of Ramsar sites in Albania is located in Albania

== See also ==
- Protected areas of Albania
- Geography of Albania
- Lagoons of Albania
- Lakes of Albania
