= Guri i Nikës-Lenie-Valamarë Protected Landscape =

Protected area and a tourist attraction in Albania

- IUCN category VI (protected area with sustainable use of natural resources)
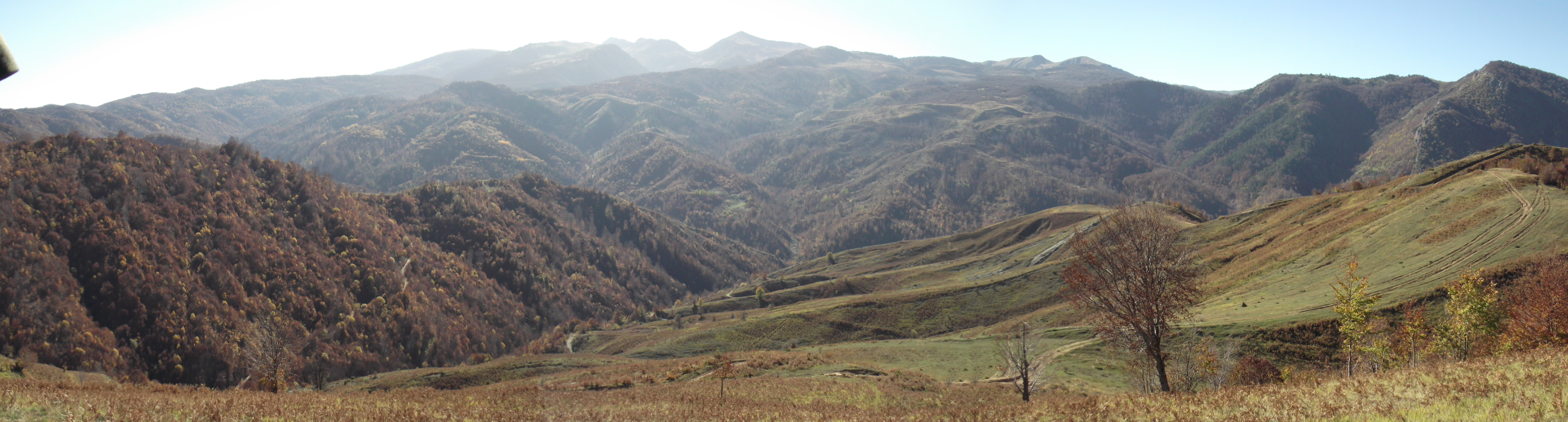
- Guri i Nikës Resource Reserve

- Location within Albania Location within Europe
- Location: Albania
- Nearest city: Pogradec
- Coordinates: 40°50′10″N 20°29′27″E
- Area: 2,200 ha (22 km^{2})
- Established: 15 January 1996
- Governing body: Ministry of Environment

Guri i Nikës-Lenie-Valamarë Protected Landscape (Albanian: Peisazh i Mbrojtur Guri i Nikës-Lenie-Valamarë) is a protected area in southeastern Albania, spanning an area of 22 km^{2} (8.5 sq mi). It was established in 1996 to protect several ecosystems and biodiversity of national importance. The resource reserve of Guri i Nikës falls inside the Pindus Mountains mixed forests terrestrial ecoregion of the Palearctic Mediterranean forests, woodlands, and scrub biome. A number of different species such as the brown bear and gray wolf, that are fast becoming rare in Southern Europe, reside in the region.

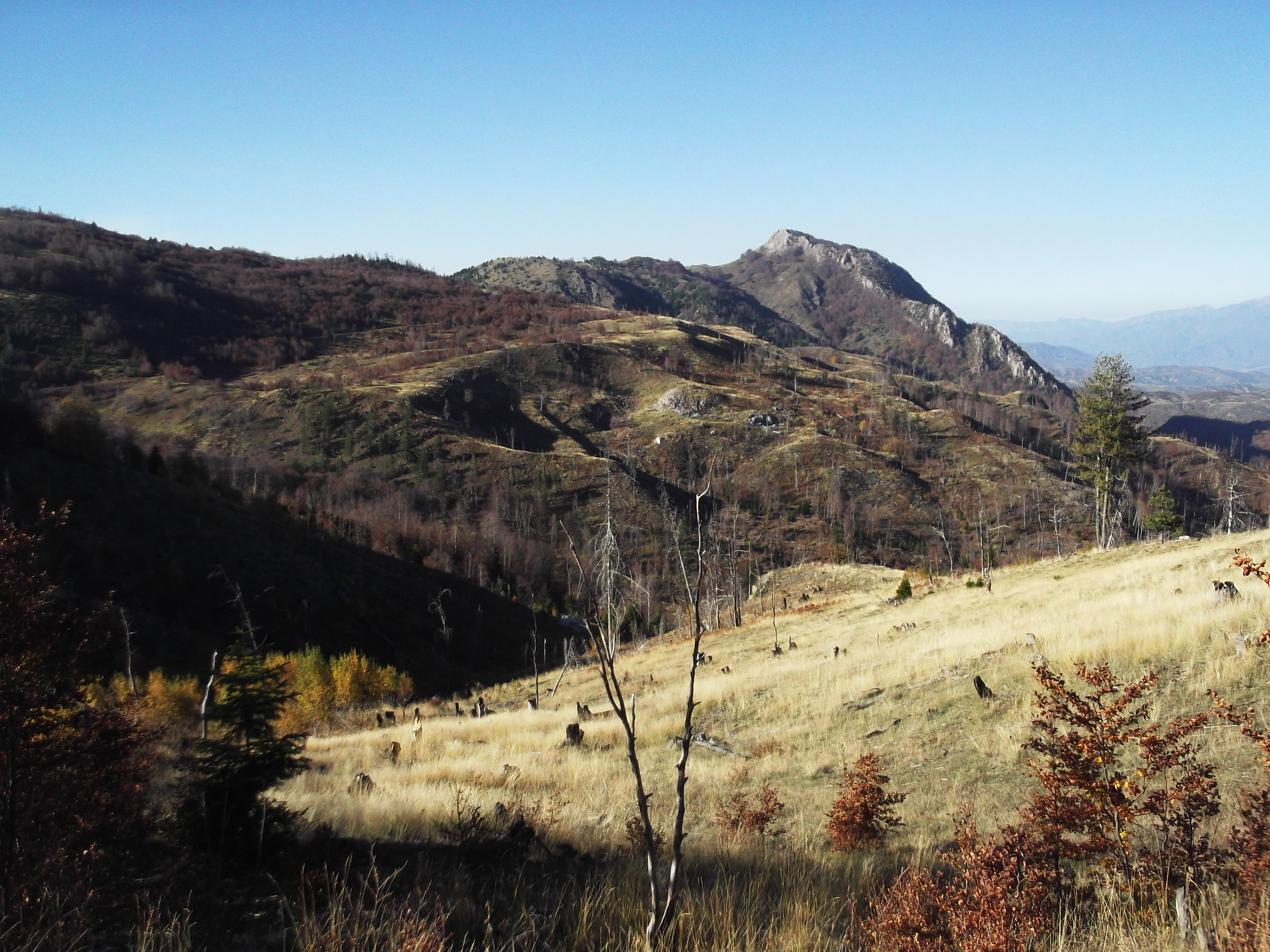
Typical habitat

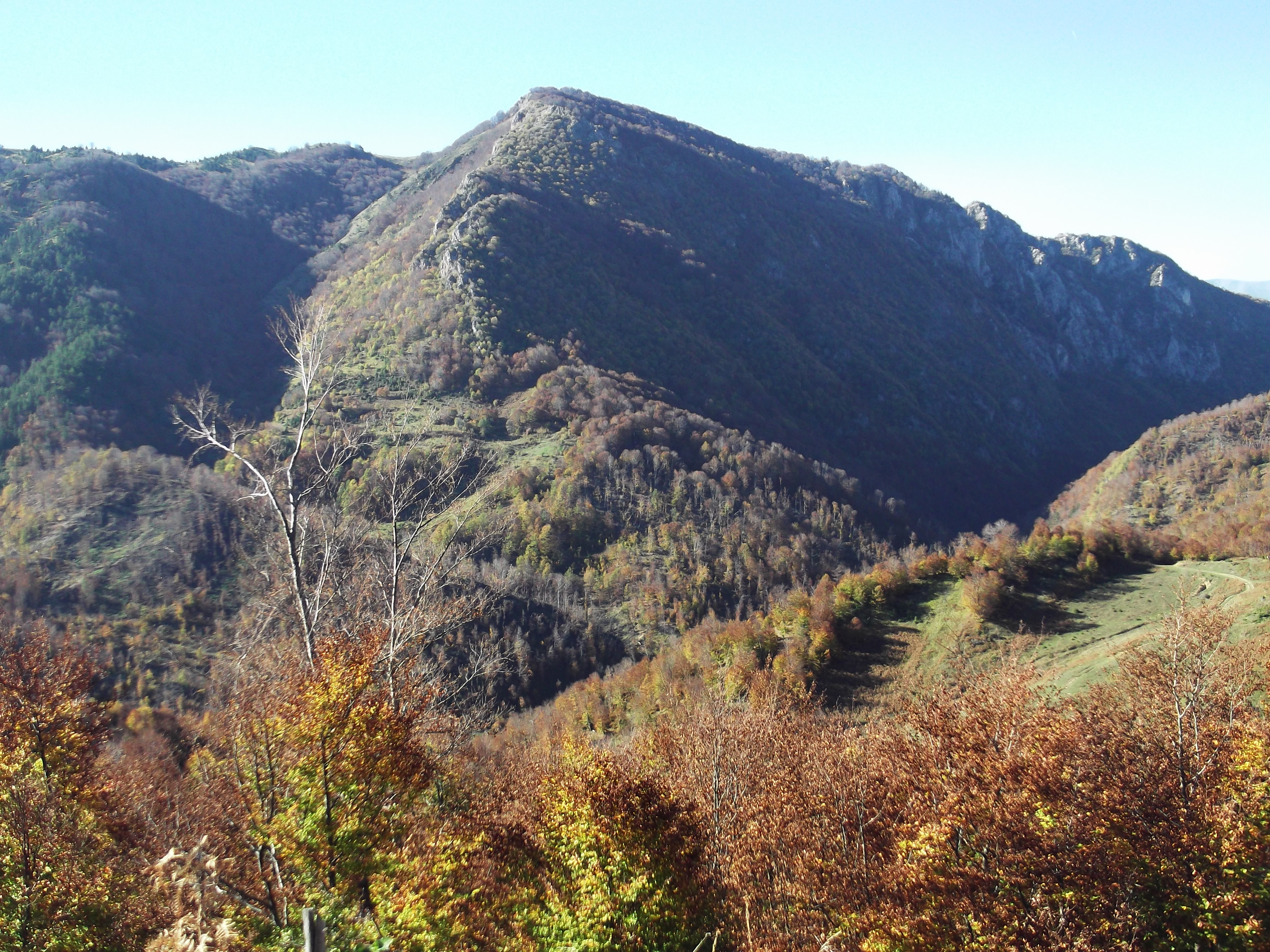
Hills within the area

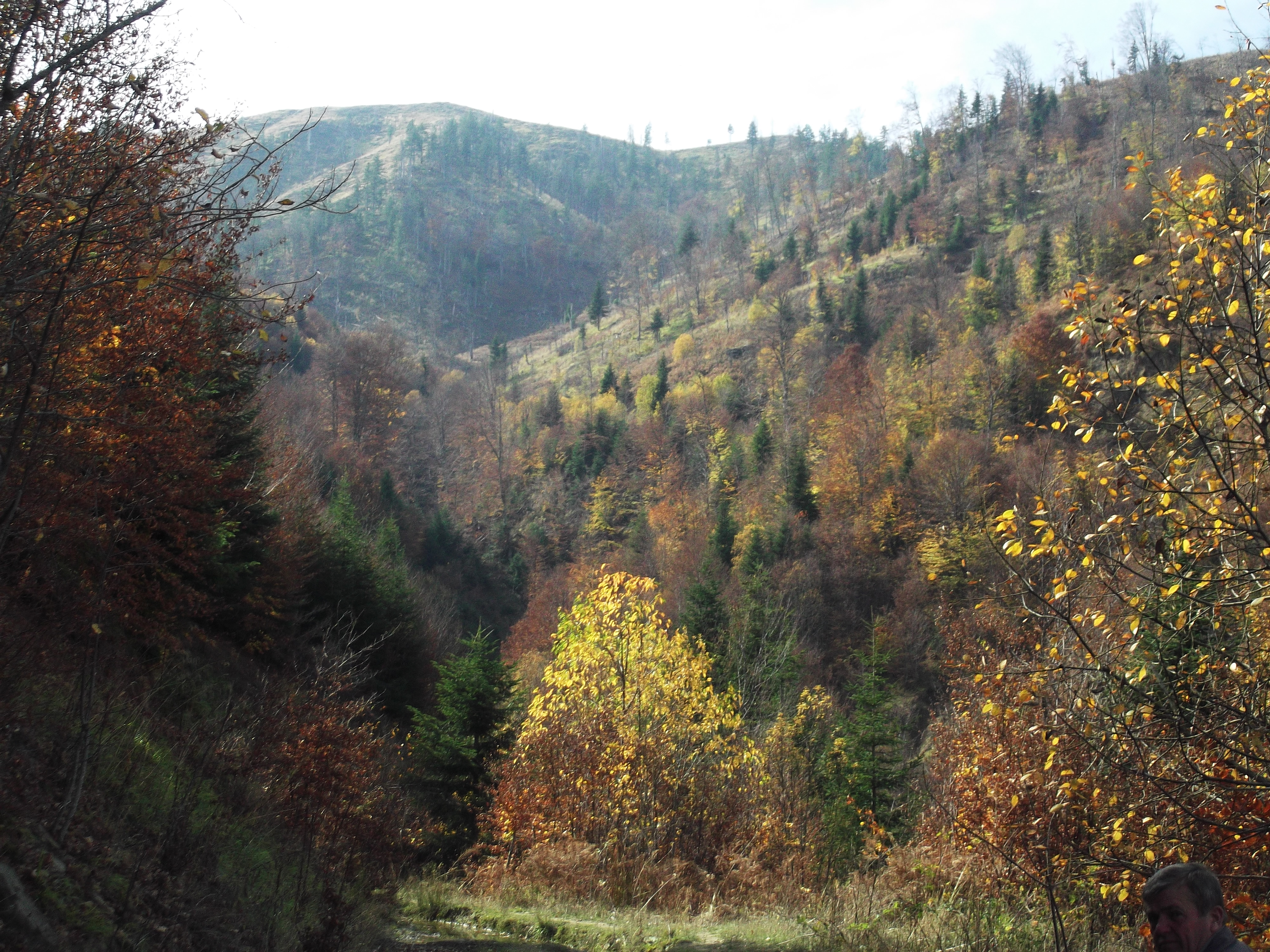
Forests of Guri i Nikës

== See also ==
- Protected areas of Albania
- Geography of Albania
- Biodiversity of Albania
