= Tahir Kolgjini =

Albanian imam, scholar, writer, poet, historian, and clerk

- Born: April 24, 1903; Lamshejt, Lusën, Kukës County, Ottoman Empire
- Died: December 12, 1988 (aged 85); Istanbul, Turkey
- Education: Fatih Sultan Mehmet Elementary School; Dar-ul Hilafet-ul Aliyye High Madrasa
- Occupations: Imam, scholar, writer, poet, historian, clerk

Hafiz Tahir Kolgjini (Lusën, Kukës County, Albania, 24 April 1903 – Istanbul, 12 December 1988) was an Albanian imam, scholar, writer, poet, historian, and clerk.

== Biography ==
He was born in the Lamshejt neighborhood of Lusën as the son of Alia (son of Osman) Kolgjini and Qamila (daughter of Sadik) Tota. He began his training with Mullah Ademi in Skopje, but emigrated to Istanbul with his family during the Balkan Wars, and though the rest of the family returned after six months, he stayed in the Turkish capital with his merchant father. Tahir studied at Fatih Sultan Mehmet Elementary School there, learning the Quran by heart and thus earning the title Hafiz. In Istanbul, he attended the Dar-ul Hilafet-ul Aliyye High Madrasa until that institution was shut down by Mustafa Kemal Atatürk in 1924.

From 1925 to 1926, he worked as a teacher and principal in Bicaj, going on to do the same in his hometown from 1927-28 until he resigned and moved to Tirana. At the end of 1928, he was appointed secretary of the peace court in Himara, followed by a promotion in April 1929 to secretary of the Court of First Instance in Kukës. In 1932, he ran for office for a banned political party in a rigged election, for which he was imprisoned in Porto Palermo Castle. After serving his sentence, he returned to Kukës to work as a government clerk.

In 1939, he was appointed mayor of Kukës. After the invasion of Yugoslavia in 1941, he settled in Prizren to promote the Albanian language as president of the Kosovo region starting on April 15, returning to Kukës once more that October. In November, he met with Muslim clergy and convened the Congress of Muslim Clergy in Prizren with Hafiz Abdullah Telaku, under the direction of Fejzi Alizoti. Kolgjini helped smooth over relations between the new body and puppet Prime Minister of Albania Mustafa Merlika-Kruja, urging the latter to mollify guerrilla Muharrem Bajraktari with an appointment as prefect of Lumë. Kolgjini was then appointed prefect in Gjirokastër from 1942 to 1943, then returned to Pristina for some months in 1943 after Kruja's dismissal. He joined the Interior Ministry of Xhafer Deva as General Director of the Police from September 1943 to his dismissal in August 1944.

From August 1944 to 24 November that year he served as a prefect of Shkodër. He escaped the advancing Allied forces by joining the exodus of Gjon Markagjoni and his followers in the short-lived Republic of Mirdita, who went through the Yugoslavia to Vienna. Kolgjini and eight friends moved on to Milan and Rome, and he would settle with an entourage of anti-communists in Reggio Emilia until 1948. On 30 June 1948 he arrived in Istanbul after a three-day voyage on a ship named after his destination.

In exile, he joined the Blloku Kombëtar Independent and participated in various Albanian emigrant causes.

He died in Istanbul.

== Work ==
He has written articles and works in many fields and different languages, on literary, political, cultural, and scientific topics. His work has been published in newspapers and magazines throughout Europe as well as in the United States of America.

Both under his own name and under pseudonyms (such as Lok Limthi, Dylej, and Dashamiri), Kolgjini published in such publications as Ernest Koliqi’s Shêjzat in Rome, Prof. Lec Shllaku’s Koha e Jonë in Paris, the Boston-based Dielli (published by Vatra, the Pan-Albanian Federation of America), and the Istanbul papers Vardari and Besa. Other works include:

- Shpalime rreth Lahutës së Malcís (“Revelations about The Highland Lute”), over 300 pages, Istanbul, 1969.
- Esad Pashë Toptani dhe akuzat q'i bahen (“Essad Pasha Toptani and the Accusations Against Him”), Istanbul, 1977.
- Të vërtetat shqiptaro-greke (“Albanian-Greek Realities”), originally published as Arnavutluk ve Yuninistan Gerçekleri in Turkish, Istanbul, 1968; a translation into Albanian was published in 1997 with a foreword by Hysamedin Feraj.
- “Fjalët turkisht në Lahutën e Malësisë” (“Turkish words in The Highland Lute”), Shêjzat, Rome, 1962.
- Luma dhe luftat e saj (“Luma and her fights”), Istanbul, 1970.
- Po vajtojmë Gjon Gjinin (“We Are Mourning Gjon Gjini”), Istanbul, 1979.
- Poetry, Tirana, 1993, a summary compiled by Agim Spahiu.
