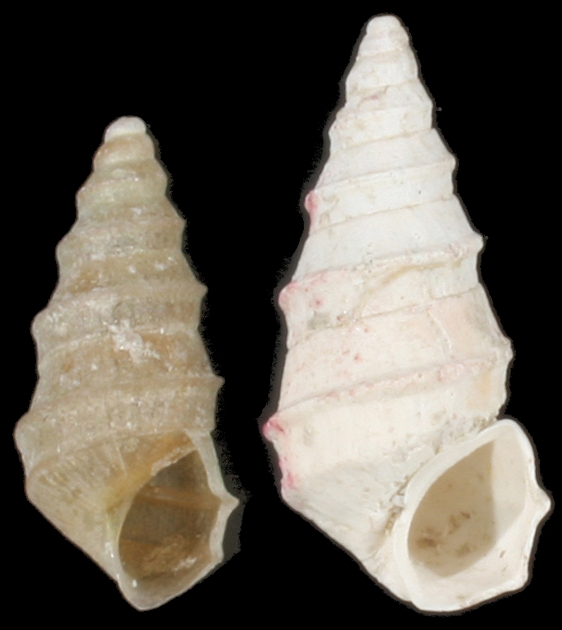
- Photo of apertural view of shells of Pyrgula annulata

Scientific classification
- Domain: Eukaryota
- Kingdom: Animalia
- Phylum: Mollusca
- Class: Gastropoda
- Subclass: Caenogastropoda
- Order: Littorinimorpha
- Family: Hydrobiidae
- Genus: Pyrgula; Cristofori & Jan, 1832

Synonyms
- Pyrgidium Toumouër, 1869; Pirgula Brusina, 1881; Pyrgiscus Herrmannsen, 1848

= Pyrgula =

Genus of gastropods

Pyrgula is a genus of freshwater snail with a gill and an operculum, an aquatic gastropod mollusk in the family Hydrobiidae.

Pyrgula is the type genus of the subfamily Pyrgulinae. Pyrgula annulata is the type species of the genus Pyrgula.

== Species ==
Species within the genus Pyrgula include:

- Pyrgula abichi Logvinenko & Starobogatov, 1968
- Pyrgula acicula A. & P. Reischutz, 2002
- † Pyrgula acuticarinata Pavlović, 1932
- Pyrgula aenigma Logvinenko & Starobogatov, 1968
- † Pyrgula andrusovi Pavlović, 1903
- † Pyrgula angulata Fuchs, 1870
- † Pyrgula angulataeformis Jekelius, 1932
- Pyrgula annulata (Linnaeus, 1758) - type species
  - Pyrgula annulata annulata (Linnaeus, 1758)
  - Pyrgula annulata dalmatica Schutt, 1968
- Pyrgula archimedis Fuchs, 1870
- † Pyrgula aspera Brusina, 1878
- † Pyrgula atava Brusina, 1881
- † Pyrgula baccata Brusina, 1878
- Pyrgula bakuana (Kolesnikov, 1947)
- Pyrgula basalis (B. Dybowski & J. Grochmalicki, 1915)
- Pyrgula behningi Logvinenko & Starobogatov, 1968
- † Pyrgula bicarinata Brusina, 1902
- † Pyrgula bicincta Lörenthey, 1894
- † Pyrgula boettgeri Brusina, 1897
- † Pyrgula boteniensis Wenz, 1942
- † Pyrgula capellinii Wenz, 1919
- † Pyrgula carrarai Brusina, 1902
- † Pyrgula cerithiolum Brusina, 1881
- Pyrgula cincta (Abich, 1859)
- Pyrgula columna Logvinenko & Starobogatov, 1968
- Pyrgula concinna Logvinenko & Starobogatov, 1968
- † Pyrgula conica Taner, 1974
- † Pyrgula crispata Brusina, 1881
- Pyrgula curta (Naliwkin, 1914)
- † Pyrgula dacica Jekelius, 1932
- † Pyrgula dalmatina Brusina, 1881
- † Pyrgula dautzenbergi (Morgan, 1915)
- Pyrgula derzhavini Logvinenko & Starobogatov, 1968
- Pyrgula dimidiata (Eichwald, 1838)
- Pyrgula dubia Logvinenko & Starobogatov, 1968
- Pyrgula ebersini Logvinenko & Starobogatov, 1968
- † Pyrgula elegans Jekelius, 1932
- † Pyrgula elegantissima (Frauenfeld, 1864)
- Pyrgula eulimellula (B. Dybowski & J. Grochmalicki, 1915)
- Pyrgula falkneri A. & P. Reischutz, 2002
- Pyrgula fedorovi Logvinenko & Starobogatov, 1968
- † Pyrgula gladilini Pavlović, 1932
- Pyrgula grimmi (Clessin & W. Dybowski in W. Dybowski, 1888)
- † Pyrgula hungarica Lörenthey, 1894
- † Pyrgula incisa Fuchs, 1870
- † Pyrgula interrupta Brusina, 1878
- Pyrgula isseli Logvinenko & Starobogatov, 1968
- Pyrgula kolesnikoviana Logvinenko & Starobogatov in Golikov & Starobogatov, 1966
- † Pyrgula konstantinovici Pavlović, 1932
- Pyrgula kowalewskii (Clessin & W. Dybowski in W. Dybowski, 1888)
- † Pyrgula krejcii Wenz in Krejci-Graf & Wenz, 1932
- † Pyrgula laevissima de Stefani, 1877
- † Pyrgula laminatocarinata (Andrusov, 1890)
- † Pyrgula laskarevi Pavlović, 1927
- Pyrgula lencoranica Logvinenko & Starobogatov, 1968
- Pyrgula lirata (B. Dybowski & J. Grochmalicki, 1915)
- † Pyrgula malcevici Brusina, 1893
- Pyrgula marginata (Westerlund, 1902)
- † Pyrgula martini Pavlović, 1932
- † Pyrgula marulici Brusina, 1902
- † Pyrgula mathildaeformis Fuchs, 1870
- Pyrgula nana Logvinenko & Starobogatov, 1968
- † Pyrgula nodotiana Tournouër, 1866
- Pyrgula nossovi (Kolesnikov, 1947)
- Pyrgula pallasii (Clessin & W. Dybowski in W. Dybowski, 1888)
- Pyrgula pambotis A. & P. Reischutz, 2002
- Pyrgula prahovensis Papaianopol & Macaleț, 2004
- † Pyrgula prisca (Neumayr in Herbich & Neumayr, 1875)
- Pyrgula pseudobacuana Logvinenko & Starobogatov, 1968
- Pyrgula pseudodimidiata (B. Dybowski & Grochmalicki, 1915)
- Pyrgula pseudospica Logvinenko & Starobogatov, 1968
- Pyrgula pulla (B. Dybowski & Grochmalicki, 1915)
- † Pyrgula purpurina Andrusov, 1890
- † Pyrgula radici Pavlović, 1927
- † Pyrgula radovanovici Pavlović, 1903
- † Pyrgula raskovici Pavlović, 1903
- † Pyrgula reljkovici Brusina, 1902
- Pyrgula rudis Logvinenko & Starobogatov, 1968
- † Pyrgula rusti Neubauer, Harzhauser, Georgopoulou, Mandic & Kroh, 2014
- Pyrgula schorygini Logvinenko & Starobogatov, 1968
- † Pyrgula sergii Brusina, 1902
- † Pyrgula serratula Brusina, 1897
- Pyrgula sieversi (Clessin in W. Dybowski, 1888)
- Pyrgula sieversi (O. Boettger, 1881)
- Pyrgula similis Logvinenko & Starobogatov, 1968
- Pyrgula simplex Logvinenko & Starobogatov, 1968
- Pyrgula sowinskyi Logvinenko & Starobogatov, 1968
- † Pyrgula subarchimedis Friedberg, 1923
- † Pyrgula syrmica Brusina, 1892
- † Pyrgula tessellata Brusina, 1897
- Pyrgula turkmenica Logvinenko & Starobogatov, 1968
- † Pyrgula turricula (Neumayr in Neumayr & Paul, 1875)
- Pyrgula ulskii (Clessin & W. Dybowski in W. Dybowski, 1888)
- † Pyrgula unicarinata Brusina, 1902
- Pyrgula uralensis Logvinenko & Starobogatov, 1968
