= Radio Skadar =

Radio station in Montenegro

Podgorica; Montenegro
- Broadcast area: Montenegro
- Frequency: 107.9 MHz

Programming
- Format: Alternative music radio

Radio Skadar is an alternative music radio station in Montenegro. Its headquarters are located on the delta of Bojana river, near Ulcinj. It is named after Lake Skadar near the city of Podgorica. Its frequency is 107.9 MHz, and is available locally in the area around Podgorica.
