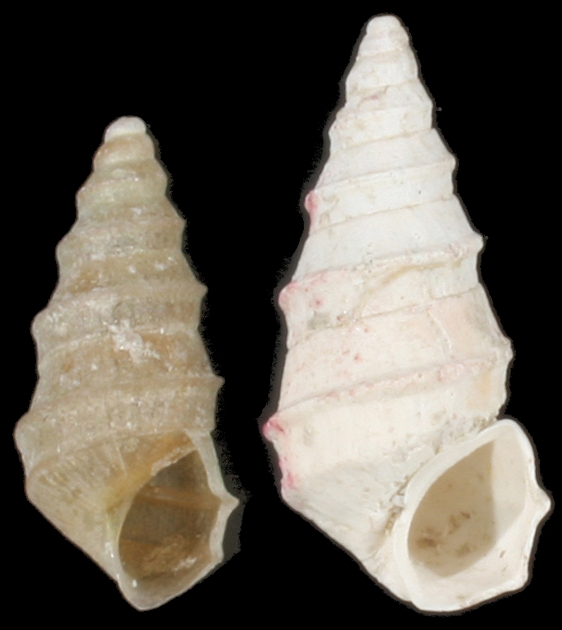
- Apertural view of two shells of Pyrgula annulata.

Scientific classification
- Kingdom: Animalia
- Phylum: Mollusca
- Class: Gastropoda
- Subclass: Caenogastropoda
- Order: Littorinimorpha
- Family: Hydrobiidae
- Genus: Pyrgula
- Species: P. annulata

Binomial name
- Pyrgula annulata (Linnaeus, 1758)

Synonyms
- Turbo annulatus Linnaeus, 1758; Melania helvetica Michelin, 1831; Pyrgula helvetica (Michelin, 1831)

= Pyrgula annulata =

Species of gastropod

Pyrgula annulata is a species of freshwater snail with a gill and an operculum, an aquatic gastropod mollusk in the family Hydrobiidae.

Pyrgula annulata is the type species of the genus Pyrgula.

== Distribution ==
This species occurs in Switzerland, Italy, Croatia, and Albania.
