= Municipal Police (Albania) =

Municipal law enforcement agency in Albania

Municipal Police Policia Bashkiake

Jurisdictional structure
- Operations jurisdiction: Albania
- Legal jurisdiction: Municipalities of Albania
- Governing body: Respective municipal governments

Operational structure
- Headquarters: Varies by municipality (e.g., Tirana)
- Agency executive: Kryeinspektor (Municipal Police Chief), Head of Municipal Police

Facilities
- Detention authoritys: No (transfer to State Police)

Notables
- Person: Mayor of respective municipality, Executive Supervisor
- Significant Administrative policing: Public Order in Local Events

The Municipal Police (Albanian: Policia Bashkiake) are local law enforcement units operating under the authority of municipal governments in Albania. They are unarmed, possess limited powers, and function separately from the Albanian State Police.

== Authority and Legal Basis ==
Their responsibilities and powers are established by Law No. 8224 of 15 May 1997 (“On the organization and functioning of municipal police”) and subsequent amendments. They operate strictly within the boundaries of their municipality and under the supervision of the mayor, with legal oversight by the prefect.

== Powers and Duties ==
Municipal Police have jurisdiction over administrative and misdemeanor offenses. Their duties typically include:

- Enforcing municipal regulations and orders issued by the mayor or municipal council (e.g., street cleanliness, noise control, illegal construction and land use)
- Maintaining public order and safety in public spaces and during local events (markets, ceremonies, public gatherings)
- Protecting municipal property
- Preventing environmental offenses such as illegal dumping
- Coordinating with the State Police to enforce public order and road safety.

They can issue on-the-spot fines for administrative violations, and in cases involving criminal matters, they pass cases to the national police for further action.

== Organization and Leadership ==
Each municipality's police force is headed by a Municipal Police Chief (Kryeinspektor), who reports to the mayor. This chief oversees internal management, allocation of duties, and cooperation with both municipal departments and national police entities. Officers are recruited according to national criteria and must receive formal training qualifications.

== Cooperation with State Police ==
Municipal Police often collaborate with the State Police under formal cooperation agreements, notably in urban centers like Tirana, enhancing municipal safety and community policing efforts.

== Equipment ==
Municipal Police are unarmed. Their fleet commonly includes small patrol vehicles—both conventional and electric.
