= Security Academy =

Police academy in Tirana, Albania

- Akademia e Sigurisë
- Type: police academy
- Established: February 25, 2015
- Rector: Prof. dr. Ilirjan Mandro
- Students: 500+
- Location: Tirana, Albania
- Website: akademiaesigurise.asp.gov.al

The Security Academy (Albanian: Akademia e Sigurisë) is a public institution in Albania aimed at educating employees of the State Police and other law enforcement agencies. It provides programs for training and qualifications at the Basic Police School level. It provides also Bachelor level education. Theory-practice learning can last 3 academic years and students benefit up to 180 credits (ECTS). Those who graduate, receive a Bachelor diploma in Security and Crime Investigation, as police officers.

== See also ==
- List of universities in Albania
- Quality Assurance Agency of Higher Education
