= Fire and Rescue services of Albania =

Fire and Rescue service of Albania
- Policia e Mbrojtjes nga Zjarri dhe për Shpëtim "Zjarrfikësat"

Operational area
- Country: Albania

Agency overview
- Established: 1945
- Employees: 739 career firefighters

Facilities and equipment
- Stations: 12 central stations

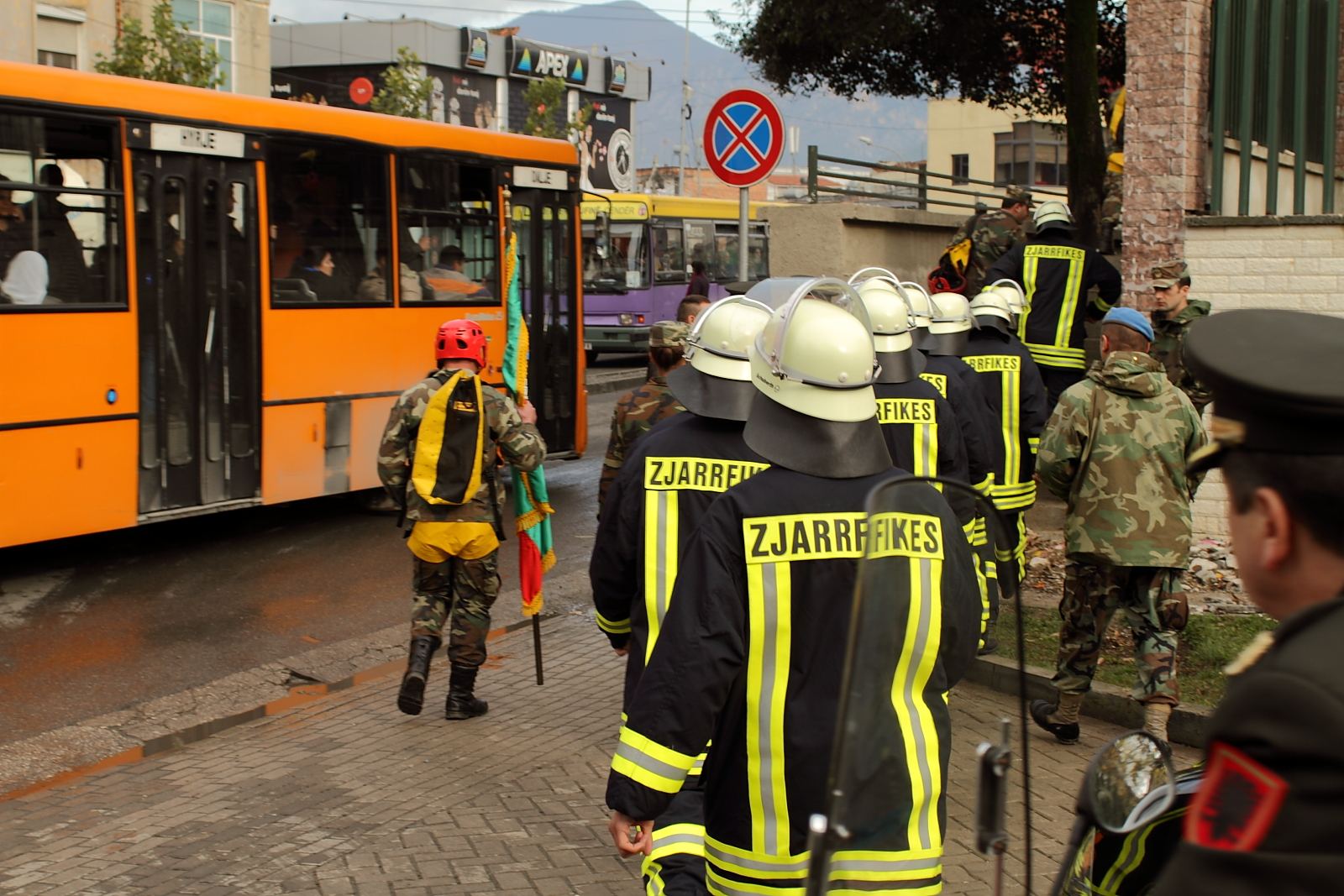
Zjarrfikset on training

The Fire and Rescue service (Albanian: Policia e Mbrojtjes nga Zjarri dhe për Shpëtim or PMNZSH) is a government department in the Republic of Albania responsible for preventing dangers related to the spread of fires, protecting citizens’ lives and property affected by the fires while being involved in rescue and relief operations and providing recovery following a disaster. The PMNZSH operates at a local level in conjunction with the General Directorate of Civil Emergencies and the Ministry of Internal Affairs.

== History ==
The agency was established in 1945 under the name Firefighting Police, which was then part of the “People's Police”. In 1991, during the transition of the political system in Albania, several changes were made to the Law on Firefighters. Until 2017 the Fire and Rescue service was commanded by the prefect for each of the 12 counties of Albania. But with the growing need for the service and the need for renovation and upgrading of all departments and vehicle fleets across the country, the "Council of Ministers" decided to decentralize some of the Fire and Rescue services and pass their direction to the municipalities.

== See also ==
General Directorate of Civil Emergencies
