= Protected areas of Albania =

Network of protected areas in Albania (2020)

Despite being a relatively small country, Albania is exceedingly rich in biodiversity. Its ecosystems and habitats support over 5,550 species of vascular and non-vascular plants and more than 15,600 species of coniferous and non-coniferous evergreens, most of which are threatened at global and European levels. The country has made recent efforts to expand its network of protected areas which now include: 11 national parks, 1 marine park, 718 nature monuments, 23 managed nature reserves, 11 protected landscapes, 4 World Heritage Sites, 4 Ramsar sites and other protected areas of various categories, that when combined, account for 21.36% of the territory. Furthermore, a biosphere reserve, 45 important plant areas and 16 important bird areas are found in the country.

Meanwhile, the central government has proclaimed the Coastline and the Tirana Greenbelt as areas of national importance.

At present, protected areas are constantly under threat by illegal logging, forest fires and the construction of hydroelectric power plants which have prompted ongoing protests from environmentalists and civil society.

The national policy for governing and the management of protected areas is implemented by the Ministry of Environment and Tourism through the National Agency of Protected Areas (AKZM).

== Strict nature reserves ==
(Cat. Ia) Strict nature reserves are limited areas of ecological significance, preserved and protected for scientific purposes, to safeguard the living world and all its cultural and natural values. Two such areas in the country have this designation: Gashi Valley and Rrajcë Strict Nature Reserve.

World Heritage Site

Name	Image	Designated	IUCN cat.	Area	Map
Gashi Valley		15 January 1996	Ia	3,000 hectares (30 km^{2})	Protected areas of Albania is located in Albania
Rrajcë Strict Nature Reserve		7 July 2017	Ia	4,700 hectares (47 km^{2})	Protected areas of Albania is located in Albania

== National parks ==
(Cat. II) National parks are vast areas of land or water, typically not less than 1000 hectares in size, that possess exceptional scientific, ecological, and educational values and are kept away from strenuous human activities. These parks are protected and monitored to maintain the ecological balance of their ecosystems, to promote scientific research, and to provide visitors with spiritual and educational experiences, in compliance with environmental and cultural regulations. A total of 12 national parks, encompassing a surface area of 313,950.77 hectares (3,140 km^{2}), occupy 10.92% of the country's territory.

World Heritage Site
Ramsar wetland or a marine protected area

Logo	Name	Image	Designated	IUCN cat.	Area	Map
	Butrint National Park		2 March 2000	II	8,622.2 hectares (86.222 km^{2})	Protected areas of Albania is located in Albania
	Prespa National Park		18 February 1999	II	27,613.05 hectares (276.1305 km^{2})	Protected areas of Albania is located in Albania
	Divjakë-Karavasta National Park		19 October 2007	II	22,389.08 hectares (223.8908 km^{2})	Protected areas of Albania is located in Albania
	Llogara National Park		21 November 1966	II	1,769.20 hectares (17.6920 km^{2})	Protected areas of Albania is located in Albania
	Shebenik National Park		21 May 2008	II	34,507.90 hectares (345.0790 km^{2})	Protected areas of Albania is located in Albania
	Alps of Albania National Park		26 January 2022	II	82,844.65 hectares (828.4465 km^{2})	Protected areas of Albania is located in Albania
	Tomorr Mountain National Park		18 July 2012	II	27,185.5 hectares (271.855 km^{2})	Protected areas of Albania is located in Albania
	Lurë-Dejë Mountain National Park		21 November 1966	II	19,288.88 hectares (192.8888 km^{2})	Protected areas of Albania is located in Albania
	Dajti Mountain National Park		21 June 2006	II	28,561.85 hectares (285.6185 km^{2})	Protected areas of Albania is located in Albania
	Fir of Hotovë-Dangëlli National Park		17 December 2008	II	36,003.76 hectares (360.0376 km^{2})	Protected areas of Albania is located in Albania
	Vjosa Wild River National Park		15 March 2023	II	12,727 hectares (127.27 km^{2})	Protected areas of Albania is located in Albania
	Karaburun-Sazan Marine Park		28 April 2010	II	12,437.7 hectares (124.377 km^{2})	Protected areas of Albania is located in Albania

== Natural monuments ==
(Cat. III) Natural monuments typically consist of natural entities and habitats that cover a limited area of land, usually no more than 50 hectares. These areas are recognized for their significant scientific, ecological, cultural, historical, aesthetic, and religious values. They may include both living organisms, such as rare or endemic species of trees and plants, as well as non-living environmental features like unique geological formations created by wind, ice, or water erosion, such as: karst springs and lakes, glacial lakes, wetlands, and sources of mining or thermal activity. A total of 718 nature monuments have been designated (government decision no. 303, dated 10.05.2019).

Name	Image	Designated	IUCN cat.	Area	Map
Tulipa Albanica Habitat		13 March 2023	III	35.5 hectares (0.355 km^{2})	Protected areas of Albania is located in Albania

== Managed nature reserves ==
(Cat. IV) Managed nature reserves are protected areas of land or water that are of local and regional importance. These areas are maintained through proper management to preserve the species, habitats, and other unique natural phenomena, with the aim of enhancing their quality and utilizing them for recreational and entertainment purposes, as well as for studies, educational, and cultural activities. A total of 23 managed nature reserves, encompassing a surface area of 216,024.68 hectares (2,160 km^{2}), occupy 7.5% of the territory.

Name	Image	Designated	IUCN cat.	Area	Map
Fir of Kardhiq Nature Park		15 January 1996	IV	4,303.6 hectares (43.036 km^{2})	Protected areas of Albania is located in Albania
Fir of Sotirë Nature Park		15 January 1996	IV	4,927.67 hectares (49.2767 km^{2})	Protected areas of Albania is located in Albania
Fir of Zhulat Nature Park		26 January 2022	IV	936.2 hectares (9.362 km^{2})	Protected areas of Albania is located in Albania
Cangonj Nature Park		27 July 1977	IV	250.3 hectares (2.503 km^{2})	Protected areas of Albania is located in Albania
Dardhë-Xhyrë Nature Park		15 January 1996	IV	400.3 hectares (4.003 km^{2})	Protected areas of Albania is located in Albania
Gërmenj Nature Park		15 January 1996	IV	1,410 hectares (14.1 km^{2})	Protected areas of Albania is located in Albania
Karaburun Nature Reserve		27 July 1977	IV	17,490.7 hectares (174.907 km^{2})	Protected areas of Albania is located in Albania
Korab-Koritnik Nature Park		21 December 2011	IV	53,850 hectares (538.5 km^{2})	Protected areas of Albania is located in Albania
Kunë-Vain-Talë-Patok-Fushëkuqe-Ishëm Nature Park		28 April 2010	IV	8,092.3 hectares (80.923 km^{2})	Protected areas of Albania is located in Albania
Gjergjevica Lagoon Nature Reserve		26 January 2022	IV	2,966.3 hectares (29.663 km^{2})	Protected areas of Albania is located in Albania
Shala Lagoon Nature Park		26 January 2022	IV	10,619.35 hectares (106.1935 km^{2})	Protected areas of Albania is located in Albania
Munellë Nature Park		26 January 2022	IV	20,760.05 hectares (207.6005 km^{2})	Protected areas of Albania is located in Albania
Mali me Gropa-Bizë-Martanesh Nature Park		31 January 2007	IV	26,043.34 hectares (260.4334 km^{2})	Protected areas of Albania is located in Albania
Lake Ulza Nature Park		3 April 2013	IV	4,205.15 hectares (42.0515 km^{2})	Protected areas of Albania is located in Albania
Polis Nature Park		15 January 1996	IV	45.1 hectares (0.451 km^{2})	Protected areas of Albania is located in Albania
Porto Palermo Nature Park		29 July 2022	IV	1,694.98 hectares (16.9498 km^{2})	Protected areas of Albania is located in Albania
Shtamë Pass Nature Park		15 January 1996	IV	6,864.36 hectares (68.6436 km^{2})	Protected areas of Albania is located in Albania
Lake Shkodër Nature Reserve		2 November 2005	IV	24,049.75 hectares (240.4975 km^{2})	Protected areas of Albania is located in Albania
Stravaj and Sopot Nature Park		15 January 1996	IV	1,548.9 hectares (15.489 km^{2})	Protected areas of Albania is located in Albania
Blue Eye Nature Park		15 January 1996	IV	293.3 hectares (2.933 km^{2})	Protected areas of Albania is located in Albania
Zagori Nature Park		26 January 2022	IV	24,607.63 hectares (246.0763 km^{2})	Protected areas of Albania is located in Albania
Balloll Nature Park		27 July 1977	IV	323.3 hectares (3.233 km^{2})	Protected areas of Albania is located in Albania
Bogovë Nature Park		27 July 1977	IV	342.1 hectares (3.421 km^{2})	Protected areas of Albania is located in Albania

== Protected landscapes ==
(Cat. V) Protected landscapes and seascapes are primarily managed for the preservation of landscape values and to provide recreational opportunities for relaxation and entertainment. This category includes areas with residential centers that allow activities like agriculture, horticulture, forestry, fishing, etc., both on land and in sea. The goal is to preserve the quality of landscapes and the harmonious interaction of human activity in them, and maintain the biological diversity they host. A total of 11 protected landscapes, encompassing a surface area of 84,746.69 hectares (847.5 km^{2}), occupy 2.94% of the territory.

Part of the Emerald network

Name	Image	Designated	IUCN cat.	Area	Map
Bjeshka e Oroshit Protected Landscape		15 January 1996	V	4,646.7 hectares (46.467 km^{2})	Protected areas of Albania is located in Albania
Fir of Drenovë-Sinicë Protected Landscape		21 November 1966	V	2,065.8 hectares (20.658 km^{2})	Protected areas of Albania is located in Albania
Guri i Nikës-Lenie-Valamarë Protected Landscape		15 January 1996	V	5,172.7 hectares (51.727 km^{2})	Protected areas of Albania is located in Albania
Qafë Bush-Kuturman Protected Landscape		27 July 1977	V	4,159.7 hectares (41.597 km^{2})	Protected areas of Albania is located in Albania
Rrushkull Protected Landscape		16 December 1995	V	579.5 hectares (5.795 km^{2})	Protected areas of Albania is located in Albania
Bisht Kamëz Protected Landscape		28 December 2020	V	491.5 hectares (4.915 km^{2})	Protected areas of Albania is located in Albania
Nikolicë Protected Landscape		15 January 1996	V	510 hectares (5.1 km^{2})	Protected areas of Albania is located in Albania
Krastë-Verjon Protected Landscape		26 July 2018	V	1,469.24 hectares (14.6924 km^{2})	Protected areas of Albania is located in Albania
Lake Ohri Protected Landscape		18 February 1999	V	28,000 hectares (280 km^{2})	Protected areas of Albania is located in Albania
Vjosa-Nartë Protected Landscape		22 October 2004	V	15,972.7 hectares (159.727 km^{2})	Protected areas of Albania is located in Albania
Buna River-Velipojë Protected Landscape		2 November 2005	V	21,678.85 hectares (216.7885 km^{2})	Protected areas of Albania is located in Albania

== See also ==
- Ohrid-Prespa Transboundary Biosphere Reserve
