= National Civil Protection Agency =

Agency within Ministry of Defence of Albania

Agjencia Kombëtare e Mbrojtjes Civile
- Formation: November 2019
- Headquarters: Tirana, Albania
- Director General: Haki Çako
- Parent organization: Ministry of Defence
- Website: akmc.gov.al

The National Civil Protection Agency (AKMC; Albanian: Agjencia Kombëtare e Mbrojtjes Civile) is a civil protection agency within the Ministry of Defence of Albania responsible for disaster risk assessment and civil protection. The head of the agency is Haki Çako.

== History ==
Under communist rule, Albania’s military was responsible for emergency management, focusing mostly on response rather than mitigation or prevention activities. Since the end of the communist regime, Albania has made significant steps towards developing an emergency management system. In 1999, to coordinate assistance during the Kosovo refugee crisis, an Emergency Management Group (EMG) was established under the Office of the Prime Minister. After the refugee crisis, the Government dissolved the EMG and passed a series of laws and decrees to establish a new emergency management system.

In 2001, the Government of Albania passed Law No. 8756, "Civil Emergency Services," which defined Government-wide emergency management roles and responsibilities. According to that law planning and implementation of civil emergency plans was the responsibility of the General Directorate of Civil Emergencies (GDCE).

Since November 2019, following the enactment of the new Law 45/2019 ‘On civil protection”, GDCE is transformed into an Agency, the National Civil Protection Agency (NCPA).

== See also ==
- Civil defense by country
- Fire and Rescue services of Albania
