= Unit 326 =

Albanian special forces group

Unit 326 commonly known as Sampistët was an Albanian special forces group. It consisted of approximately 600 members. Its duties included counter-terrorism, riot control, search and rescue, and demolition. In some respect its duties were reminiscent of the British SAS. After 1991 the unit was abolished due to its controversial role and association with the Communist government of Albania, and its members were dispersed into subsequent special operations units such as RENEA, ROS, Shqiponjat, and the Commando Brigade.

== History ==
Unit 326 was activated on 22 January 1982 as Battalion 326 in an anti-riot role under the all-powerful Ministry of Interior. The first batch of recruits came from a variety of military and law enforcements units such as the army, National Guard, National Police and Navy divers. In the period 1982-1990 the unit was mostly employed in security measures in sport stadiums, which due to the degeneration of the political and economic situation in Albania were considered as potential hubs of mass movements of insurrection. In this period the unit came only twice in armed conflict.

The first time was in September, 1982 when a band of three Albanian expatriates - named Haznedari and Mustafa, and an unidentified resident of New Zealand - reputedly joined with rightwing political exiles and decided to challenge the Communist dictatorship. Haznedari, owner of a commercial laundry in Rome and banned from the U.S. for several years on political grounds, and the New Zealander were reputedly undercover Communist Albanian intelligence officers, who had left Albania in the late 1940s to spy on their fellow nationals living in exile. Mustafa, also an immigrant from Albania and owner of a Staten Island, NY auto repair shop, had fled a US court trial on drug smuggling charges in the spring of 1981. The trio chartered a fishing boat in a southeast Italy village and were transported across the Adriatic Sea by the boat's skipper. Mustafa was killed by Albanian security forces on the beach near Fier where they landed from their chartered boat, as was Hazndari. The New Zealander was captured, tried and imprisoned for several years before being freed and deported to Auckland and his family. Prince Leka Zogu, pretender to the long-abolished Albanian throne, at first claimed a link to the strange events, but soon denied being involved.

The second time, a few years later, that Unit 326 intervened against a common criminal who was barricaded in a house in Shkodër.

With the fall of the Iron Curtain, and the apparent inability of the authorities to enforce law and order, the Unit began recruiting many conscripted soldiers in an effort to maintain an all-around capability to deal with the growing demand in law enforcement initiatives. At this time the only mandated duties were anti-riot. It was at this time (1991) when the unit registered its first fallen operative – a 21-year-old killed in cold blood by a band of criminals.

In January 1991, under pressure from the international community as well as Albanian public opinion, a general amnesty was declared for the political prisoners languishing in communist jails and work-camps. When common criminals, serving their sentences in the same jails, understood that the amnesty left them out, rioted. In the Shenkoll (trans:Saint Nicholas) penitentiary the riots were particularly violent were dozens of prisoners took hostage several guardians. The Unit was called into action and managed to bring about a solution to the crisis by using only tear-gas and plastic bullets, avoiding in the process any fatalities.

== Transformation ==
With the change of regime, the new democratic government began an anti-communist crusade by dismissing many individuals – investigators, attorneys, and police officers – deemed compromised by association with the old regime. Organized crime, domestic and foreign, took advantage of the ensuing law and order vacuum and began spreading illegal activities in the country. With the deterioration of the situation, it became impossible for the unit to serve under a dual role – anti riot and CT hostage rescue – and for this reason in November 1991, following a strict and rigid selection, approximately eighty out of six-hundred of its members formed RENEA. The rest of the unit was folded into other elite units, such as Forcat e Nderhyrjes se Shpejte FNSh (Rapid Intervention Forces), organized according to the French CRS (Compagnies Républicaines de Sécurité), and U.S. SWAT. FNSH maintain a presence in 12 prefectures of the country.
