= Special Operations Unit (Albania) =

The Special Operations Unit (ROS) (Albanian: Reparti i Operacioneve Speciale) was an Albanian special forces unit, under the authority of the country's Ministry of the Interior.

== See also ==
- RENEA
- Shqiponjat
- FNSH
