= People's Police =

People's Police may refer to:

- People's Police (Albania)
- People's Police of the People's Republic of China branches:
  1. Public Security Organs People's Police
  2. State Security Organs People's Police
  3. Judicial Administrative Organs People's Police
  4. People's Courts Judicial Police
  5. People's Procuratorates Judicial Police
- People's Police Force, the official name of the Myanmar Police Force
- Vietnam People's Police Force, a branch of Vietnam People's Public Security
- Volkspolizei, national police of the German Democratic Republic (East Germany)
- a book by Norman Spinrad
