= Fehim Mezhgorani =

Albanian politician

2nd Director of the Albanian State Police
- In office 24 May 1913 – 30 January 1914
- Preceded by: Halim Gostivari
- Succeeded by: Hil Mosi

Personal details
- Born: 12 August 1874 Tepelenë, Ottoman Empire
- Died: 4 February 1930 (aged 55) Peshkopi, Albania

Fehim Mezhgorani (12 August 1874 – 4 February 1930) was one of the delegates of the Albanian Declaration of Independence.

Along with Dhimitër Tutulani he worked under Petro Poga to draft the Statute that separated the Albanian Justice system from the jurisdiction of the Ottoman Empire.
