= Veli Vasjari =

Albanian public official

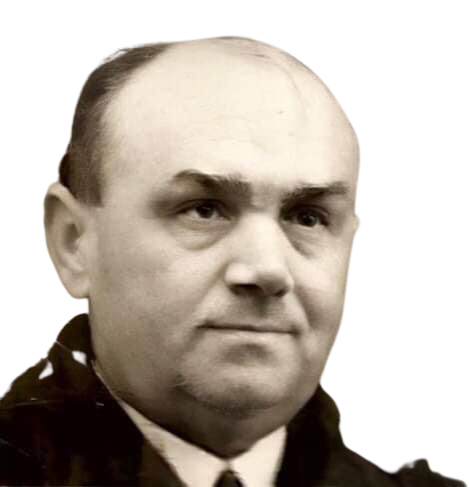
- Veli Vasjari

4th Director of the Albanian State Police
- In office 1 April 1914 – 30 June 1914
- Preceded by: Hil Mosi
- Succeeded by: Sulejman Kërçiku
- In office 11 January 1922 – 22 April 1922
- Preceded by: Ahmet Sinani
- Succeeded by: Halim Jakova-Gostivari

Personal details
- Born: 12 April 1887 Tepelenë, Ottoman Empire (present day Albania)
- Died: 12 May 1944 (aged 57) Korçë, Albania
- Cause of death: Assassinated

Veli Vasjari (1887–1944) was an Albanian public official and patriot who gave a considerable contribution in the early development of police institutions in Albania. He served as the 4th Director of the State Police and later held several positions as prefect and deputy prefect in the post-independence period.

== Early life ==
In the personal state archive file of Veli Vasjari, he is mentioned as having studied at the Vefa Gymnasium in Istanbul and was proficient in Turkish, Greek and Italian.

== Career ==
Vasjari rose to become one of the main exponents of the early gendarmerie force. From May to December 1913, he served as police commissar in Berat. The following year, a contingent of dutch officers arrived in the country and were tasked by the Great Powers to organize the Albanian Armed Forces. With the relocation of the capital to Durrës, Vasjari came in charge of the State Police and served as its director from April 1 until June 30. He served as deputy prefect of Lushnje (1920) then prefect of Elbasan (1933–1935), Dibër (1936) and Korçë (1937–1939). Vasjari was killed on May 12, 1944 during a skirmish between communist partisans and the security entourage of the SATA company in the area between Grabovicë and Çërravë (Korçë region).
