= 2014 Lazarat drug raid =

Albanian police raid on cannabis growers

- Part of the war on drugs
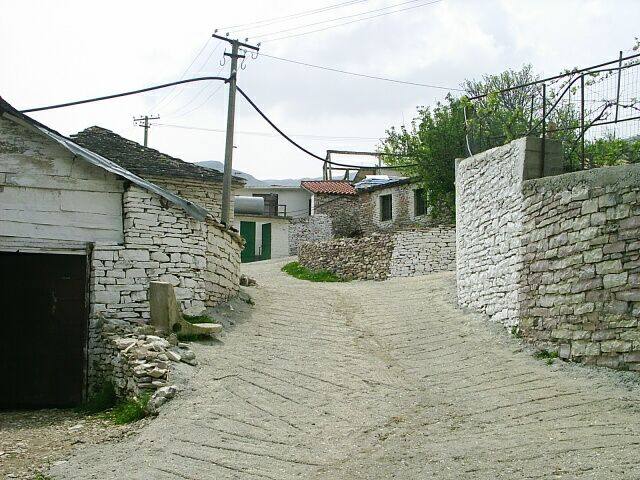
- The village of Lazarat
Date	16–20 June 2014
Location	Lazarat, Gjirokastër County, Albania
Result	Albanian government victory: Destruction of Lazarat's cannabis cultivation; Albania gains EU Candidate status; Cannabis growers move out of Lazarat to the surrounding areas

Belligerents
Albanian government: Albanian police; RENEA	Drug trafficking gangs: Albanian mafia; Cannabis cultivators

Commanders and leaders
(Albania) Edi Rama; Artan Didi	

Units involved
800 policemen; RENEA; 2 helicopters; Armored vehicles	30 cannabis cultivators

Casualties and losses
3 wounded	14 arrested

On 16 June 2014, around 800 heavily armed Albanian police officers began a large scale raid in the mountain village of Lazarat, targeting cannabis growers, as part of a nation-wide operation to quell illegal cannabis plantations. Armed drug gang members responded with fire from automatic rifles, RPG-7s and mortars. After a four-day siege, the police entered the village and its surrounding fields, and arrested fourteen villagers and mafiosos; there were no fatalities. Following the establishment of state authority in the area, the police destroyed around 91,000 cannabis plants.

Albania had for a long time been the largest producer of cannabis in Europe, which had hindered the country's effort to join the European Union. As a result of Albania's EU aspirations, Prime Minister Edi Rama initiated a country wide crackdown on illegal cannabis cultivation.

== Background ==
Lazarat is a village in southern Albania. It sits 3 kilometres (1.9 mi) south of the city Gjirokastër. After the fall of the People's Socialist Republic of Albania, most communities in southern Albania had been plagued by depopulation as a result of migration. Some villages in the vicinity of Lazarat, like Pogon, lost as much as 80% of their population.

In 1997, Albania fell into civil unrest as a result of a pyramid scheme. The civil unrest peaked in the south of the country where criminal gangs and rebels took control. Military depots were looted, which resulted in the theft of around 650,000 firearms, 3.5 million grenades, 1 million landmines and 1.5 billion rounds of ammunition. Lazarat became a rebel stronghold during this time. A report by the landmine monitor in 2001 states that General Karoli had recovered 5,350 anti mines, which had been locked in tunnels since the civil unrest, "from the former rebel stronghold of Lazarat".

Lazarat's population stayed rather stable, due to profits coming from its illegal cannabis trade. At its peak, there were an estimated 300,000 cannabis plants being cultivated in the village and its surrounding hills. This generated around 6–8 billion dollars per year, which at the time was roughly half of the Albanian GDP.

The Albanian police had for a long time unsuccessfully tried to infiltrate the village. In 2004, a police helicopter flew over the village in an effort to gather intel and was met by automatic gunfire from villagers armed with AK-47s.

In 2012, two young Dutch tourists were able to enter the village. They filmed the cannabis cultivation there and uploaded the video to YouTube. The video caused a scandal in Albania. Lazarat was subsequently dubbed "Europe's marijuana Mecca". The scandal caused political-diplomatic reactions which forced Tirana to take action.

== Raid ==
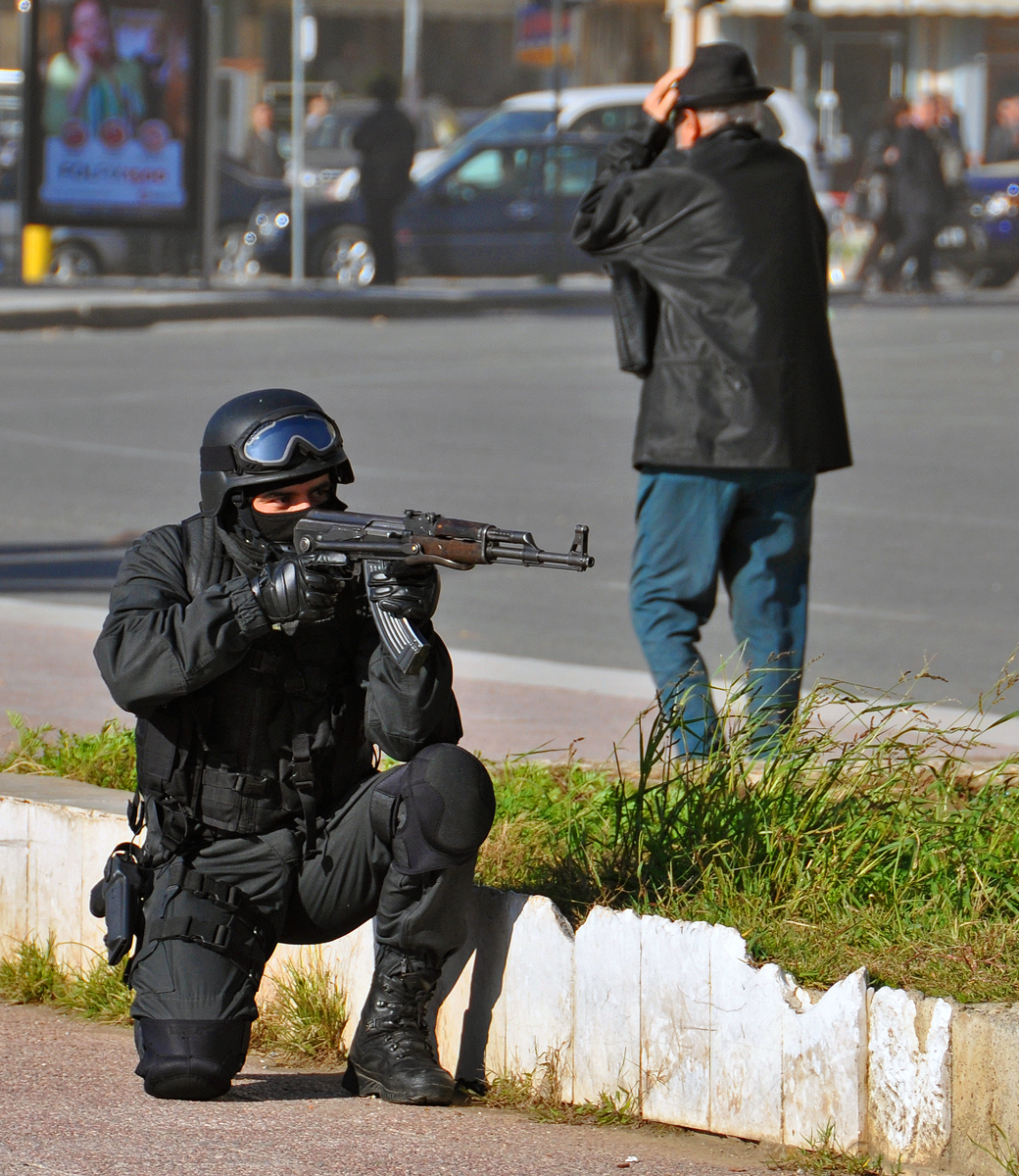
a RENEA's Operator at ALMEX 2010 (Albanian Military Exhibition on Security and Defense), RENEA special police were present during the police operation

=== 16th of June ===
Albanian police started the operation against the Cannabis cultivators in Lazarat. Around 500 heavily armed Albanian police accompanied by armored trucks and special forces besieged the village. Heavily armed gang members responded with fire from automatic weapons, rocket propelled grenades and mortar shells. The police came under attack once they reached the outskirts of the village, at this time televisions reporters were broadcasting the operation live.

=== 17th of June ===
On the second day of the operation, the police had reinforced to 800 officers. According to law enforcement officials, a significant portion of the gunfire originated from two houses suspected of containing large caches of weapons. Within the community, numerous drug gang members were observed firing weapons from strategic positions, utilizing resources from at least four underground armament deposits previously belonging to the military and readily accessible from the village. The police managed to capture around a quarter of the village. The police seized "considerable quantities" ammunition, drug-processing machinery and cannabis. The government forces then destroyed around 11,000 cannabis plants. Albania's interior minister Saimir Tahiri told AP News that the police operations would continue until "every square centimeter in Lazarat is under state control". Smoke arose from the village as cannabis cultivators started to burn their crops.

=== 18th of June ===
As of the late evening hours on Wednesday, approximately 800 police officers had cautiously advanced into sections of the village that were being actively defended by gang members, gaining control over half of the village. Authorities incinerated 11.3 metric tons of marijuana that had been packaged into sacks and destroyed 70,000 cannabis plants. Furthermore, two separate cannabis processing facilities were dismantled. As part of the operation, law enforcement officers had searched over thirty homes, resulting in the confiscation of significant quantities of ammunition.

=== 19th of June ===
On the 19th of June the police advancement had been stalled by anti-aircraft gunfire. Gunmen on the nearby Mount Sopot were operating an anti aircraft gun. A group of RENEA operators were flown in, on a AS332 Super Puma and dispersed the gunmen. This led to a police breakthrough.

=== 20th of June ===
By the 20th of June the entire village was under police control; the Albanian police declared victory. A thick haze of smoke lingered over the village, as a result of the incineration of marijuana that had taken place throughout the day. This marked the first day without any gunfire since the operation began. According to official reports, a total of 25.4 metric tons of marijuana and 91,000 cannabis plants, as well as four drug-manufacturing facilities, were destroyed after authorities searched 162 structures. Notably, law enforcement officials discovered a ton of marijuana concealed within a water tank in an underground storage room in one of the homes. In addition, authorities seized 20 heavy firearms, tens of thousands of rounds of ammunition, and numerous rocket-propelled grenades during the operation.

A total of 14 people were arrested. Three police officers and one villager were wounded during the operation as a result of the gunfire exchanged between police and drug gang members.

== Aftermath ==
A week after the conclusion of the operation on the 27 of June 2014, Albania was awarded European Union Candidacy. Deutsche Welle reporter Angelina Verbica wrote "is probably no coincidence that a week ahead of the decision in Brussels the police in Albania brought a stronghold of for the growing of marihuana under control. In the village of Lazarat, which is known as Europe's biggest cannabis-growing area, the police has destroyed 12 tons of marihuana."

On 24 June 2015, a member of the Albanian counter-terrorist force RENEA was shot and killed in the town, and two other soldiers wounded. A car containing gunmen had been stopped at a checkpoint, with attackers then opening fire on the soldiers from a nearby house. Following the murder of the police officer, a new operation commenced that involved 400 police officers which resulted in the arrest of 8 people.
