= People's Police (Albania) =

Former law enforcement agency in Albania

People's Police Policia Popullore

Jurisdictional structure
- Operations jurisdiction: People's Socialist Republic of Albania

The People's Police (Albanian: Policia Popullore) was the main law enforcement agency of the People's Socialist Republic of Albania between 1945-1991. It was the law enforcement successor to the interwar Royal Albanian Gendarmerie and served primarily as the civilian law enforcement agency of Albania throughout the Cold War. The People's Police was subordinate to the Ministry of Interior and served a separate function to the Sigurimi police during the Hoxhaist era of Albanian history. The People's Police was disbanded in 1991 following the change of the Albanian governmental system.

== History ==
The People's Police was founded on May 14, 1945, and officially sanctioned as a formalized law enforcement agency by Law No. 144 on August 30, 1945, by the Interim Postwar government. The People's Police primarily served as a regular police force imitating various other communist states of the Eastern Bloc such as the Militsiya model of policing among the USSR and its client states. Although initially created to safeguard communist control over the general populace, by 1947, the police forced had expanded significantly and were allocated greater funding and resources by the state, primarily to defend industry and maintain control of Albania's rural regions. Additionally, the People's Police maintained 36 regional branches in each district (rreth) and varied in size demanding on each rreth's population size.

In 1951, the People's Police was targeted by a bombing attack in Elbasan with Sali Ormeni, the Head of the Albanian police, being assassinated in this attack with allegations of a false flag attack.

In 1982, the Mustafa Band, an anti-communist band of guerrilla breached Albania's borders and murdered four police officers; this inevitably lead to the creation of the "Sampistet" or Unit 326, the predecessor to the RENEA. That year, Unit 326 would serve as the special police forces of the late communist period in addition to anti-riot functions when it was activated in 1990.

The general structure of the People's Police was subdivided into five branches by 1989; the Police for Economic Objectives, Communications Police, Fire Police, Detentation/Penal Police, and the General Police. Although functions between the General Police and Sigurimi overlapped, the People's Police primarily functioned on a local rather than a national level (unlike the Sigurimi). All members of the People's Police, regardless of which branch they served had to be members of the Party of Labour. Much like the military, the People's Police would face significant changes and reforms through the Hoxhaist era as Albania routinely shifted alliances among the major communist parties of the Cold War era.

By 1991, the People's Police would officially be weakened due to budget constrains and rising anti-government sentiments. Ramiz Alia and the ruling party opted to reduce the personnel by 30% to put less strain on the state's limited budget. By July 1991, the People's Police would officially be disbanded alongside the Sigurimi. The State Police would serve as the legal successor to the former People's Police. Much of the files on dissidents would be destroyed.

== Structure ==
The People's Police mainly served local law enforcement functions, although they were subordinated to the Ministry of Interior. Generally, service to the People's Police was mandatory for party members, typically for three years. Each bureaus was as follows:

- General Police - primarily responsible to stop criminal elements within the general society but also to stop political dissidence. It served as the largest bureau of the People's Police and was subdivided into 36 districts. Its main role was to investigate crimes, traffic violations among others. The General Police often cooperated with the Sigurimi in general investigations, and within larger towns and cities, they maintained internal security sections and files on dissidents and citizens.
- Police for Economic Objectives - primarily served as security for Albania's industrial complexes, maintaining security within these facilities and ensuring general worker obedience to quotas. They also guarded state buildings, construction projects and state-owned enterprises.
- Communications Police - primarily served as the police forces that guarded communist Albania's telecommunications, bridges, railroads, telephone and telegraph networks. In addition they often tapped into phones to listen in on communications among the general populace.
- Fire Police - also under the People's Police umbrella, the fire police primarily served as firefighting functions and natural disaster relief.
- Detention Police - established in 1947, it primarily was responsible for maintaining Albania's penal colony network and maintain control among the prisoner population. It also put down prisoner revolts.
- Auxiliary Village Police - Founded in 1947, and enshrined into law by 1948, the Auxiliary Village Police was a conscripted service of able-bodied men who primarily served as collaborators to the People's Police. Unlike service to the General Police, which required three years, Village Auxiliary Units served two months out of the year. The auxiliary police were part-time police officers who provided additional manpower to the People's Police in times of need. They also served as a bridge between the state and the rural regions of Albania which remained loose from direct control by the government.
