= Beretta Nano =

Italian compact semi-automatic pistol

Nano
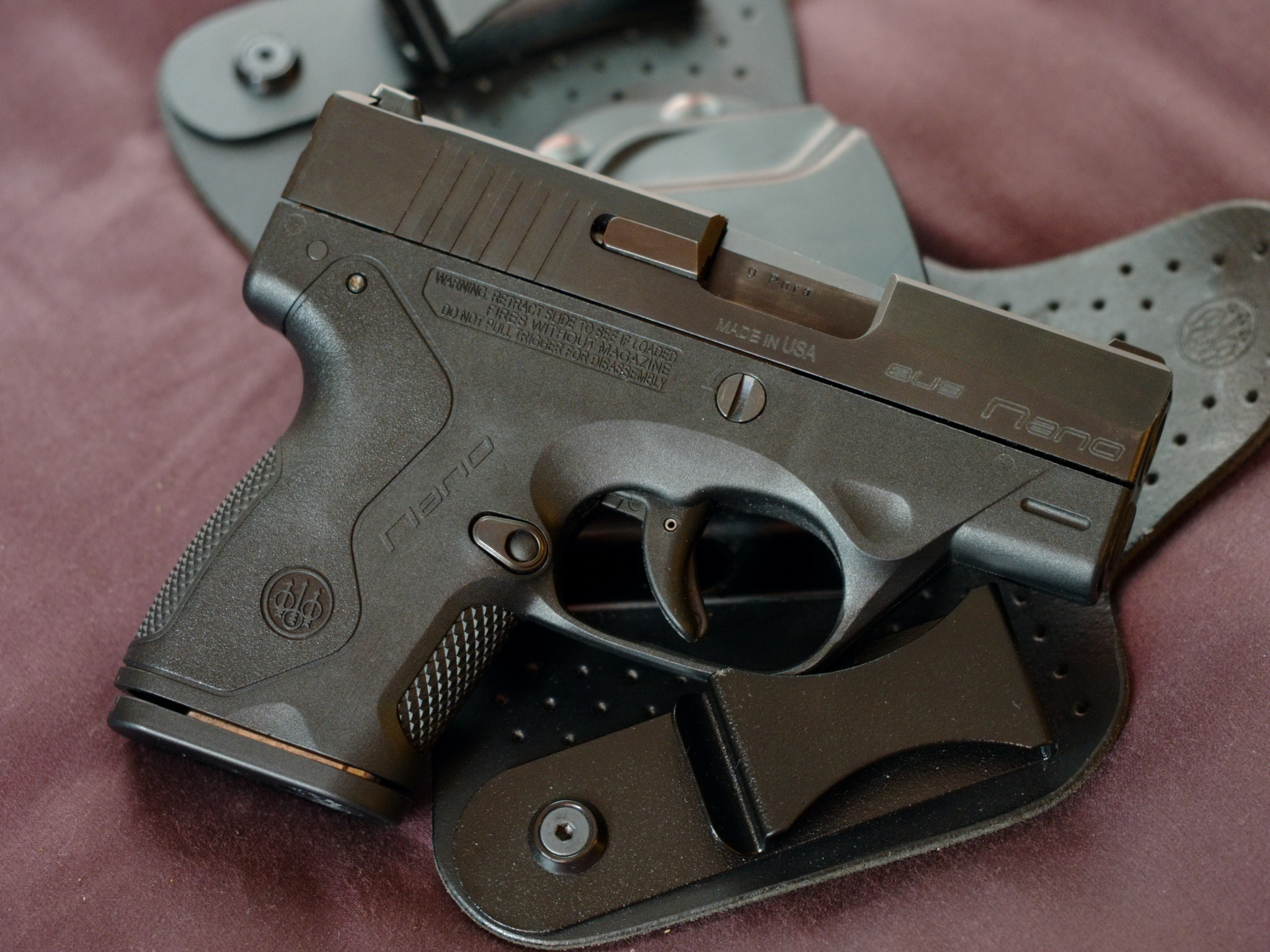
- Beretta Nano with holster
- Type: Semi-automatic pistol
- Place of origin: United States

Production history
- Manufacturer: Beretta
- Unit cost: $536
- Produced: 2011 - 2019; 2019 - present (APX Carry)

Specifications
- Mass: 19.8 ounces (0.56 kg)
- Length: 5.6 inches (14 cm)
- Width: .9 inches (2.3 cm)
- Height: 4.17 inches (10.6 cm)
- Caliber: 9×19mm Parabellum,
- Barrels: 3.07 inches (7.8 cm)
- Action: Striker

The Beretta BU 9 Nano is a semi-automatic, striker fired, micro compact pistol line that was manufactured by Beretta USA in the United States at its Gallatin, Tennessee facility. Until 2016, it was manufactured at Beretta USA's main headquarters in Accokeek, Maryland. The Nano was introduced in October of 2011 and was chambered in 9mm Luger.

== History ==
The Nano was discontinued in 2019, when Beretta introduced the APX Carry (which is largely a cosmetic refresh of the Nano).

The Nano is not available for retail sale in the state of California, as it does not meet handgun roster requirements.

== Design ==
The Beretta Nano is a compact handgun developed for concealed carry. It has a fiberglass infused "technopolymer" frame and a Pronox finished slide. Pronox is a form of ferritic nitrocarburizing finish similar to Tenifer (as used on for example Glock pistols) and Melonite (as used on for example Springfield Armory XD and Smith & Wesson M&P pistols). The sights on the Nano are low-profile 3-dot sights.

The 9mm version of the Nano holds 6 rounds of ammunition in a single-column box magazine, for a total capacity of 7 if the pistol is chambered and the magazine is fully loaded. A .40 S&W version of the pistol was in development, but was never produced.

The Nano was designed with a removable serial-numbered chassis separate from the frame, an unusual feature notably also found in the SIG Sauer P250-series pistols. This allows the owner to customize their grips with multi-colored frames without replacing the component that legally constitutes a firearm.

Designed to be used as a concealed carry self-defense weapon, the Nano has no external slide lock or release. Additionally, the Nano has no external safety. The absence of these protruding controls reduces the likelihood of the weapon snagging on clothing during an occasion where a quick and clean draw is required. The slide locks in a rear position after the magazine has been emptied. A loaded magazine must then be installed, or the empty magazine withdrawn, and the slide must be pulled rearward, in order to cycle the slide completely.

Early owners of the Nano voiced concern about an intermittent failure to eject (FTE) while using lower quality ammunition with 115 grain bullets. Some users of the Nano counter that 115 grain ammunition would seldom, if ever, see service in the Nano as it is employed to its intended purpose of a concealed carry defensive weapon, although 115 grain ammunition is frequently used in training and range shooting. Many add that the Nano is rated for 9mm +P ammunition, and as such requires ammunition heavier than 115 grains to function as designed, although Beretta did not mention this in the owner's manual or in any of its marketing materials. Most Nano owners agree that the pistol functions best on ammunition with bullets of 124 grains or heavier, and this opinion is seconded by many representatives of Beretta USA.

== Legacy ==
Beretta also used the modular/removable fire control unit concept for the Pico pistol and APX platform.

== Users ==
- Indonesia: Limited use by Indonesian Navy.
- Philippines: Philippine Drug Enforcement Agency with 40 Beretta Nanos delivered in 2013.
