= Beretta Pico =

- Type: Pistol
- Place of origin: United States

Production history
- Designer: Beretta
- Manufacturer: Beretta
- Produced: 2013–2020

Specifications
- Mass: 11.5 ounces (330 g) (unloaded)
- Length: 5.1 inches (130 mm)
- Barrel length: 2.7 inches (69 mm)
- Width: 0.7 inches (18 mm)
- Height: 4.0 inches (100 mm)
- Cartridge: .380 ACP
- Action: Double Action Only
- Maximum firing range: 300 meters
- Feed system: 6-round box magazine
- Sights: Iron sights

The Beretta Pico is a small, semi-automatic pistol intended for concealed carry. It has been discontinued by Beretta.

== Design ==
=== Specifications ===
The Beretta Pico is chambered for the .380 ACP.

The Beretta Pico measures 5.1 inches in length, 4 inches in height, and 0.725 inch in width; barrel length is 2.7 inches and the pistol weighs 11.5 ounces unloaded. The Pico is a Double Action Only (DAO) pistol. The frame of the gun is made of polymer. The slide is made mostly from stainless steel, with the exception of the iron sights. The Pico's magazine holds six rounds; one additional round can be held in the chamber.

=== Features ===
The Beretta Pico magazine release is of the paddle variety, but much smaller than is ordinary for a weapon employing this feature. This is to aid concealment and a snag-free draw. The design of this release means that it is also ambidextrous in nature. The iron sights can be removed and replaced with the use of a 1.3 mm hex key, as they are dovetailed into the slide of the pistol. The pistol also features a low profile slide stop and locks open on an empty magazine. Additionally, the internals of the pistol are removable to allow changing of grips, or to thoroughly clean the pistol, similar to the Beretta Nano.

=== Owner feedback ===
A few reports online show customers complaining of broken or "defective" firing pins. By and large, this is not the case. The owner's manual states on page 18 that a broken firing pin is the result of dry firing the pistol without dummy rounds in the chamber. Use of dummy rounds will prevent this breakage from occurring.

By comparison, some owners have found the Beretta Pico to have a stiff action and heavy trigger. All Beretta Pico pistols manufactured after 2015 use upgraded springs, resulting in a mild improvement to spring weight. Dealers often recommend manipulating the slide of the firearm to ensure that the owner can adequately manipulate it.

== Accessories ==
The frame of the handgun is available to purchase in multiple colors. Holsters have also been developed for the Beretta Pico by several companies, most noticeably by Beretta, the manufacturer of the handgun.

== Uses ==
The Pico was designed for self-defense and deep concealment—its small size and snag-free profile makes it more suitable for pocket or ankle carry than inside-the-waistband carry.
