= State Police (Albania) =

Main law enforcement agency of Albania

State Police Policia e Shtetit
- Patch of the State Police

- Flag of the State Police
- Common name: Policia
- Abbreviation: ASP
- Motto: Në shërbim të komunitetit “In service of the community”

Agency overview
- Formed: 13 January 1913; 113 years ago
- Preceding agency: Gendarmerie (1925–1939); People's Police (1945–1991)
- Employees: 11,645 (2026)
- Annual budget: €373 m EUR (2026)

Jurisdictional structure
- National agency: Albania
- Operations jurisdiction: Albania
- Area: 28,748 km2
- Population: 2,402,113 (2023)
- Governing body: Government of Albania
- Constituting instrument: Law on "State Police"
- General nature: Local civilian police

Operational structure
- Overseen by: Ministry of Internal Affairs
- Headquarters: Bajram Curri Boulevard, Tirana
- Police Employees: 10,460
- Civilian Staffs: 1,185
- Minister responsible: Ervin Demo, Internal Affairs Minister
- Agency executive: Skënder Hita, General Director

Website
- Official Website

The State Police (Albanian: Policia e Shtetit) is the national police and largest law enforcement agency of the Republic of Albania. This agency is responsible for ensuring the safety of citizens, keeping the public order, and serving the people anytime anywhere. The Albanian Police emergency number is 129, or 112 for general emergency services.

== History ==
The original Albanian Police was founded on 13 January 1913 by the government of Ismail Qemali, Albania's first prime minister.

The collapse of the Communist system and the establishment of political pluralism post-1991 brought important changes to the structure of the Albanian Police. The Ministry of Public Order and the General Directorate of Police were established in April 1991, and the new law of July 1991 established the Public Order Police. Nearly 80% of police manpower, i.e. personnel who had served under the previous system, were replaced by new recruits.

On 4 November 1991, the Albanian Police was accepted as a member of Interpol.

=== The unrest of 1997 ===
Following the collapse of the Albanian economy in January–February 1997 in the wake of the implosion of the Ponzi pyramid banking schemes promoted by the government, increasing insurgency in early March led to the Police and Republican Guard deserting en masse because it became clear they were unlikely to be paid, leaving their armouries unlocked, which were promptly looted by parties unknown, believed to mostly have been the local crime bodies and self-appointed militias: many of the weapons eventually surfaced in the ethnic fighting in Kosovo.

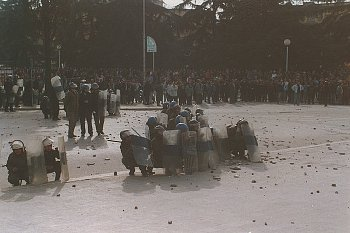
Riot policemen during 1997 unrest in Tirana

The resulting anarchy led a number of nations to use military forces to evacuate citizens, culminating in the UN authorising Operation Alba ("Daybreak"), a short-term military stabilisation force led by the Italian Army, tasked with facilitating the repatriation of foreigners and laying the foundations for another International Organisation to undertake the longer-term stabilisation. The political debate eventually settled in Europe within the body responsible for the defence diplomatic coordination of the Continent, the Council of the Western European Union. In a 2-hour meeting which convened at 1400 hrs on 2 May 1997, the WEU Council decided on the immediate establishment of the Multinational Advisory Police Element, sending a pathfinder officer, a Norwegian Police Colonel, the same evening. The Italian force in Operation Alba predicated the Command structure of MAPE passing into the Italian Carabinieri, General Pietro Pistolese, previously commanding the Genoa region, bringing his team with him. Four phases followed, assessment, reconstruction, support of the Albanian Police control during the Kosovo Crisis, and finally build-down and handback in early 2001, which was somewhat accelerated ahead of the transfer of the WEU's operational responsibilities to the Council of the EU on 30 June 2001. The reconstruction principally involved the reconstruction of the Judicial system and the training of Police, but the Finance section also accommodated economic specialists acting as the principal feedback into the correction of the Judicial system. The Command Team later formed the core of the European Union Border Assistance Mission Rafah from 2005 onwards.

=== Public perception ===
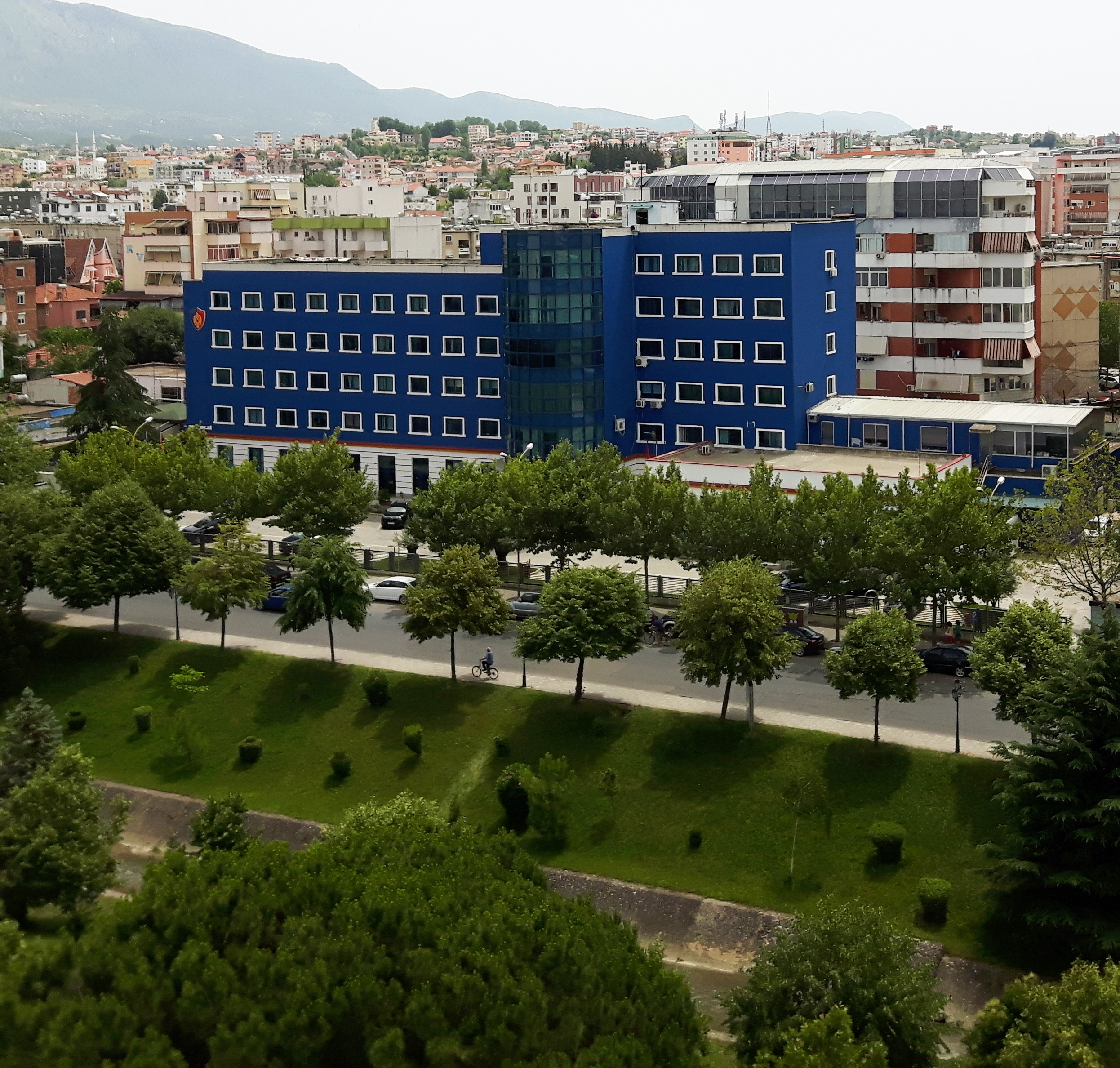
Building of the Albanian State Police Headquarters in Tiranë

According to the 2025 National Police Satisfaction Survey conducted by the Institute for Development, Research, and Alternatives (IDRA) in partnership with the Swedish government “Strengthening Community Policing in Albania” program, Albanians’ perception of the police was as follows:

- Public Safety: 82% of respondents reported feeling “safe” or “very safe” when walking alone in their neighborhood after dark.
- Property Crime Concerns: 69% of respondents reported rarely worrying about home burglaries.
- Police Performance Rating: 65% of respondents rated the State Police as performing “good” or “very good,” while 8% rated them as “poor.”
- Treatment by Police: 67% of respondents believe police often or very often treat citizens with respect, while approximately one-third feel that respect is rarely shown.

The 2025 survey provides valuable insights into the public's perception of the Albanian State Police, indicating progress in safety and government performance, while also identifying areas for further improvement in police-citizen interactions.

=== Recent developments ===
From 2014 to 2016, the Albanian State Police conducted several operations in criminally active regions, such as Lazarat, to restore public confidence and encourage support for law enforcement actions. In June 2014, approximately 800 police officers raided Lazarat, a village notorious for large-scale cannabis cultivation, seizing over 10 tonnes of marijuana. During this period, body cameras became an integral tool for the police, extensively used in drug busts and high-profile operations. In February 2016, body cameras were installed on police uniforms to improve police behavior and deter bribery. However, the initiative to use body cameras began to decline due to high operating and maintenance costs, as well as time constraints, ultimately leading to their discontinuation for field policemen.

In response to ongoing challenges, the Ministry of Interior introduced the Public Order Strategy 2015–2020, accompanied by the Action Plan 2015–2017. This comprehensive strategy aimed to modernize the Albanian State Police and align it with European Union standards. Key objectives included enhancing transparency and accountability, improving infrastructure, integrating advanced technologies into police operations, and building partnerships between the police and the public through community policing initiatives. The 2020s marked significant advancements in the operations of the Albanian State Police, particularly in tourism management. Between 2022 and 2024, the Border & Migration Department, especially the Border & Migration Police Team stationed at Tirana International Airport, effectively managed a yearly influx of 7 to 12 million passengers entering the country. This accomplishment highlighted the department's efficiency and contribution to Albania's growing tourism sector.

As part of the draft law, there are plans to integrate artificial intelligence into police operations: installing intelligent camera systems across about 20 cities and along the coastline, aiming for continuous territorial control 24/7. Also changes are proposed to how police leadership is appointed—more transparency and oversight (e.g. police chiefs selected via council rather than only by a general director).

About regular operations, for example in January 2025 saw 121 operations, 19 international, large seizures (drugs, firearms). Then in May 2025 the State Police carried out 99 operations targeting organized crime; over 600 arrests, and international operations to capture high-risk individuals. Lastly, in August 2025 there were about 90 police operations with ~664 people arrested for various crimes.

=== Significant arrests since 2020s ===
The arrest of Former President of Albania Ilir Meta in October 2024, who was apprehended by DPFO Operatives on orders from SPAK, in the middle of the street, dragged outside of his vehicle and then escorted back to the police commissariat. He was arrested on allegations of corruption, money laundering, hiding assets / failing to declare property and income. He is a significant political figure, since he is in the opposition.

The arrest of Former Prime Minister of Albania and opposition leader Sali Berisha in December 2023, on orders from SPAK, put on house arrest after Parliament of Albania removed his immunity, on charges for passive corruption and abuse of office related to helping his son-in-law in a privatization deal in Tirana. In November 2024, he was released from house arrest, though SPAK appealed. Berisha denies the charges, calling them politically motivated.

The arrest of Former Environment Minister Lefter Koka in December 2021, accused of abuse of office, corruption, money laundering in connection with a concession contract for an incinerator in Elbasan; accused of accepting bribes up to €3.7 million.

The arrest of Former Mayor of Tirana Erion Veliaj in February 2025, on orders from SPAK, apprehended by the State Police at his residence. He faces charges of passive corruption, money laundering, and concealment of assets, linked to the controversial Tirana incinerator project. Veliaj remains in custody while his legal team appeals, and Deputy Mayor Anuela Ristani serves as acting mayor.

The arrest of Former Mayor of Himara Fredi Beleris in March 2024, on orders from SPAK, he was sentenced to two years in prison for vote-buying during the 2023 mayoral election.

The arrest of Former Mayor of Durrës Vangjush Dako in June 2023 and 8 other officials of the Municipality of Durrës, on orders from SPAK, on charges for abuse of power related to unauthorized construction and inflating project costs, leading to significant financial losses.

The arrest of the "Belgian Most Wanted", also known as Safet Rustemi, considered one of Belgium's most dangerous criminals, Rustemi was involved in several assassinations in Albania and attempted to control prostitution rings in Brussels using violence.

The arrest of Edmond “Edi” Dodaj, an International Drug Trafficker. Dodaj was a fugitive for nearly a decade. He led a network responsible for importing large quantities of cocaine from the Netherlands to Italy. He was apprehended by RENEA operatives following a European arrest warrant issued by Italian authorities. The arrest of Shkodra's strongman Safet Bajri in February 2025, apprehended by RENEA operatives on orders from SPAK, he was charged with being linked to organized crime activities, including drug trafficking and violent offenses such as the involvement in the 2018 murder of Fatbardh Lici in Shkodra.

The arrest of "The Gambling King" Ervis Martinaj in October 2018, after he was implicated in a deadly shooting in the former Bllok area of Tirana, resulting in the death of Fabian Gaxha. Martinaj was arrested but later released on bail due to insufficient evidence. In 2022, Martinaj went missing under mysterious circumstances. His whereabouts remain unknown, and he is considered a fugitive by Albanian authorities and has an Active Warrant for his arrest.

The arrest of three Internationally Wanted Albanian Criminals. Emirjan Beu, Syrjan Tola, Dorian Beu, all of them were arrested as part of "Operation Highway" which saw the dismantling of an international drug-trafficking criminal group. This also led to the seizure of their assets in Albania estimated to be over €1 million.

The arrest of over 200 Suspects as part of the Operation to counter the drug distribution near schools, led to the large seizures of narcotics of various types (cannabis, heroin, cocaine, ecstasy), showing public safety concern especially near schools.

== Rank structure ==
In 2015, the State Police underwent reorganizational reforms which were expected to continue for several years. It implemented a new hierarchical structure composed of nine hierarchic ranks.

Unlike many countries in the world where every sworn in Policeman is called or referred to as a Police Officer, in Albania it works completely differently. Albanian State Police has preserved the way policemen are addressed, keeping them the same as during the Communist Era, when the Albanian Police used Military Ranks. For example: The Military would address Commissioned Officers as Officers and Enlisted men were to be addressed to as Soldiers, this was the same case for the Albanian Police.

Today the State Police's Senior Ranking Officers and High Ranking Officers are addressed to as Police Officer (Albanian: Oficer policie) and those that are below Vice Commissar are addressed to as Police Effective (Albanian: Efektiv policie) or simply Policeman (Albanian: Polic). Officially by law every State Police employee term of addressing is Police Employee (Albanian: Punonjës policie).

| | Police Directors | Senior Ranking Officer | | | | Police Commissars | Lower Ranking Officer | | | Policemen | Lower Ranked Policeman | |
|---|---|---|---|---|---|---|---|---|---|
| Ceremonial Field Albanian Police Ranks | | | | | | | | | |
| Ceremonial Field Albanian Police Ranks | Chief director Drejtues Madhor | Senior director Drejtues i Lartë | First director Drejtues i Parë | Director; Drejtues | Head commissar Kryekomisar | Commissar; Komisar | Vice commissar Nënkomisar | Inspector; Inspektor | Cadet; Kursant |
| Equivalent to American Police Ranks | Chief of Police | Chief of Department | Inspector | Deputy Inspector | Captain | Lieutenant | Sergeant | Police Officer | State Police Cadet |
| Notes | The Director of the Albanian State Police Agency. | The Director of any Albanian State Police Department. | The Director of any Albanian State Police Regional Directory or Bureau. | The Deputy Director of any Albanian State Police Regional Directory or Bureau. | Most commonly they are Police Station Chiefs or hold other positions for example in Directories. | Usually are Section Chiefs or Unit Commanders. Sections can vary depending on commissariat, and might be Order Section, Criminal Section, or even Border Section. Depending on seniority, they are usually next in line for the Police Station Chief. | Shift Supervisors on Borders, but also Patrol Units. Can also be as an Regional Directory Staff member and or hold commanding powers. | Regular Field Policeman, this rank makes up 80% of the State Police Force. Needs 3 years of experience and additional education before competing for Vice Commissar. | Non-graduated Policeman still on the academy. |

== Branches ==
| Patch | Branch unit | Type |
|---|---|---|
| | Policia e Rendit; The Order Police is tasked to deal with issues of Public Order, assist and help local population. | Regular Field Police |
| | Policia Rrugore; The Road Police administers road safety and Enforces Traffic Regulations. | Regular Field Police |
| | Policia Kufitare dhe Migracionit; The Border & Migration Police is in charge of migration and border control. | Regular Field Police |
| | Shqiponjat; The Eagles are a rapid response unit that handles domestic criminal activities. | Special Field Police |
| | Forcat e Ndërhyrjes së Shpejtë; The Rapid Intervention Force, also known as FNSH, is a quick intervention unit primarily dealing with cases of violent riots and special operations. | Special Reserve Police |
| | Reparti i Neutralizimit të Elementit të Armatosur; Unit for the Neutralization of the Armed Element, also known as RENEA, is the main counter-terrorism and critical incident response unit. | Special Force Police |
| | Drejtoria e Forcës së Posaçme Operacionale The Directorate of the Special Operational Force, also known as DFPO, is the main Criminal Police Special Force, similar to RENEA. | Special Operational Criminal Police Force |
| | Akademia e Sigurisë The Security Academy is a public institution in Albania aimed at educating employees of the State Police and other Albanian law enforcement agencies. | Training Academy |

== Recruitment and training ==
To join the Albanian State Police, you must meet specific eligibility criteria and successfully navigate a multi-step recruitment process before being eligible to join the Albanian Security Academy on the way to become an Police Employee.

=== Applying for the Security Academy ===
- Be Albanian citizen.
- Be no older than 30 years.
- Have completed at least secondary education.
- Be in good physical and mental health.
- Be at least 170 cm tall for men and 165 cm for women.
- Have a valid category “B” driver's license.
- Have no criminal convictions or pending criminal cases.
- Possess a certificate of reliability.
- Not be excluded from the State Police or other national security structures, nor have left civil service.
- Be fluent in spoken and written Albanian.
- Have a High School Graduation Score of 5.5 for Basic Police Academy and 6.5 for Officer's Police Academy.

Additionally, Senior Ranking Officer Positions and above require a university degree in fields such as law, economics, or computer science, along with a minimum GPA of 8.0.

=== Training and Security Academy ===
The Albanian State Police is trained through a structured and formal process at the Security Academy of Albania, which is the central institution for police education and training. The Academy creates both Policemen and Officers depending on what you choose and what you qualify for. Usually standards for the basic option are lower than those for Officers.

New Cadets undergo basic training at the Security Academy, which may and includes some of the following:

==== Theoretical education ====
- Albanian criminal and procedural law
- Human rights and democratic policing
- Police ethics and professional standards
- Use of force and firearms laws
- Public order and crowd management
- Communication and conflict resolution
- Cybercrime and digital evidence (for certain positions)

==== Physical training ====
- Physical fitness and endurance exercises
- Self-defense and arrest techniques
- Firearms training (marksmanship and safety)
- Tactical driving and pursuit operations
- Role-playing and scenario-based simulations
- First aid and emergency response

Basic Police Academy Training for Policeman lasts 9 months, combining classroom work and field exercises focusing more on a professional field role. Cadets must pass final exams to graduate and become full police employees with the rank of Inspector.

Officer's Academy Police Training for Officers lasts 3 years and is considered a Bachelor's degree. The Academy goes through Law thoroughly more than the Basic Academy, and also heavily focuses on Leadership Skills and Organization. Cadets must pass yearly final exams, and one final exam at the end. Once the cadets graduate, they begin their Career as Vice commissars and they may compete further on their Career for Higher Officer Ranks.

Specialized trainings

After initial training, police employees can apply for specialized courses based on their assigned roles or career paths. These may include:

- Criminal Investigation Techniques
- Anti-Terrorism and Organized Crime
- Border and Migration Police
- Cybercrime Investigation
- Forensics and Evidence Handling
- Community Policing Strategies

Special units like RENEA, anti-drug unit, and counter-trafficking units receive advanced tactical training, often in collaboration with international partners such as with German GSG 9 or SEK.

== Equipment ==
Albanian State Police has had a lot of Communist era equipment in storage, even though a few are still in use today. However, since 2014 the Ministry of Interior has been actively modernizing the State Police's uniforms, vehicles and weaponry, introducing newer modern equipment to replace their outdated Communist era equipment.

=== Field Police Employees’ Uniforms ===
The Albanian State Police uniforms have undergone several changes since 1991. Some visible changes to their uniforms and equipments are shown below:

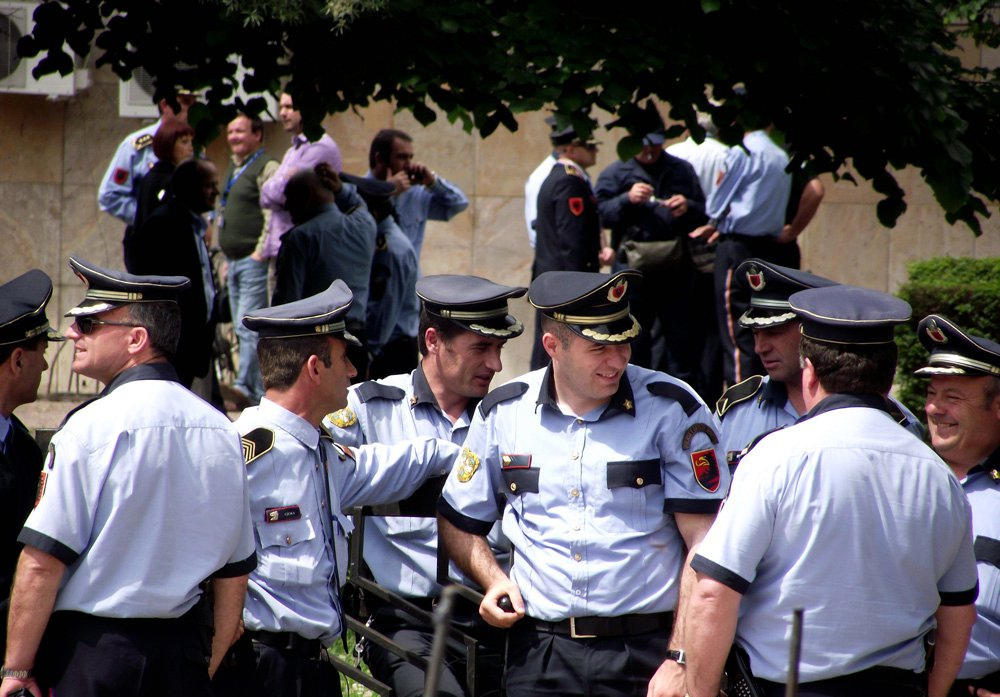
Albanian Police Uniforms 1999-2014

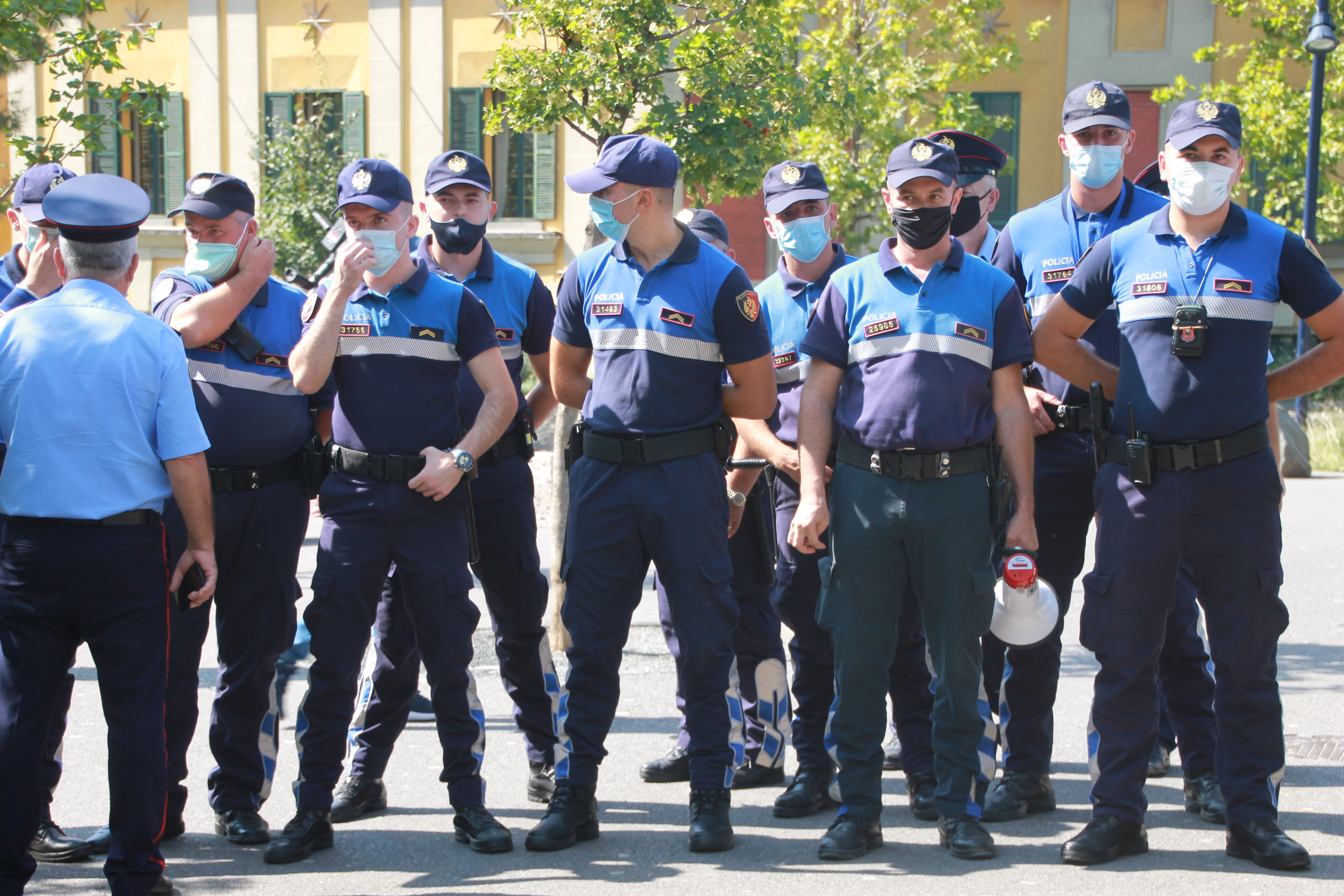
Albanian Police Uniforms 2014-2021

Policemen are equipped with tactical trousers, tactical boots or durable sneakers, and a dark blue T-shirt displaying the branch patch, State Police patch, badge number, and rank. The T-shirt also includes reflective markers and “Police” (Albanian: Policia) printed on the front and back. Over the T-shirt, officers wear a semi-tactical blue vest, with colors varying by branch. The vest includes a large front pocket, reflective markings, “Police” lettering, and the badge number.

In addition, policemen are issued a tactical duty belt, which typically holds the standard-issue firearm, handcuffs, an additional utility pouch, and spare firearm magazines. For headgear, a police cap is provided, bearing an eagle insignia representing the Albanian eagle.

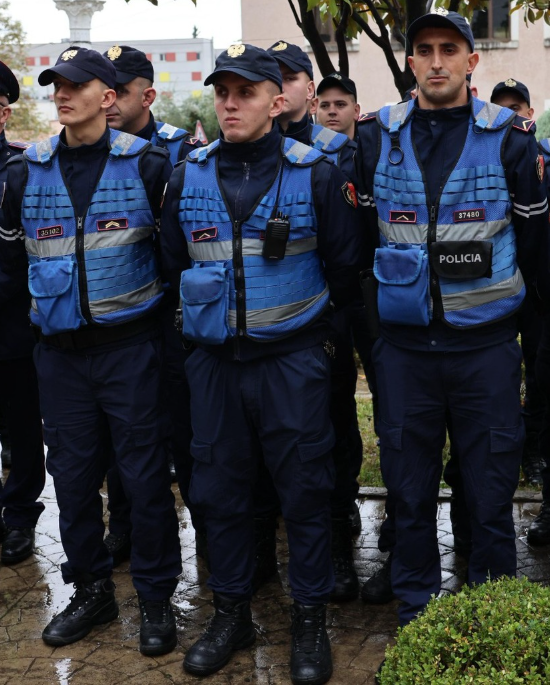
Policeman's' Uniform 2021-Present

For officers, the uniform differs significantly from the standard policemen uniform. Instead of tactical trousers, boots, or T-shirts, officers wear black polished shoes, black trousers featuring thin red side stripes, and a blue shirt bearing the branch patch, State Police patch, badge number, and rank insignia (also displayed on the shoulder boards). A tactical duty belt may be worn, though its use is not frequent. The uniform is completed with a police hat featuring the Eagle insignia.

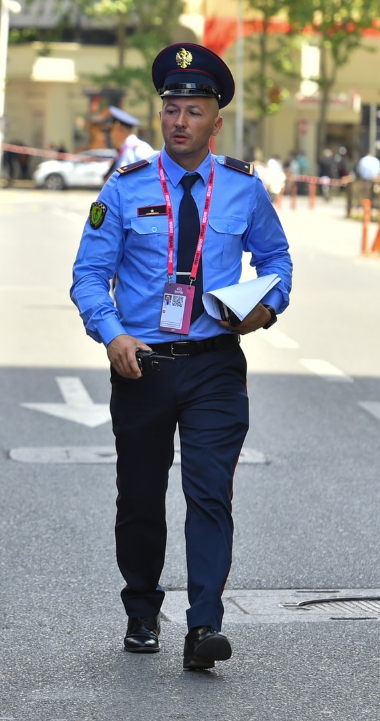
Officer's Uniform

=== Specialized Police Units ===
The Albanian State Police like all other Police Forces around the world has some of its own Specialized Police Units, responsible for many different operations or missions.

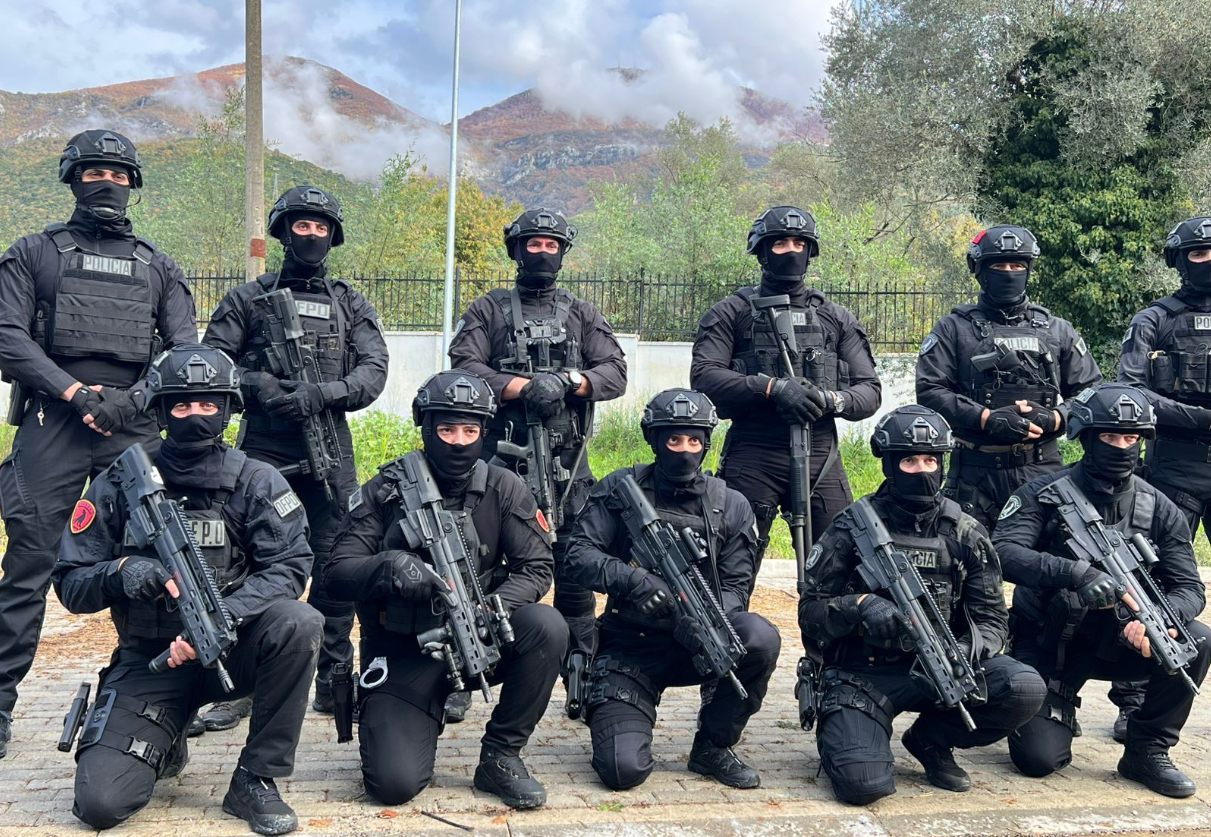
DFPO Operatives

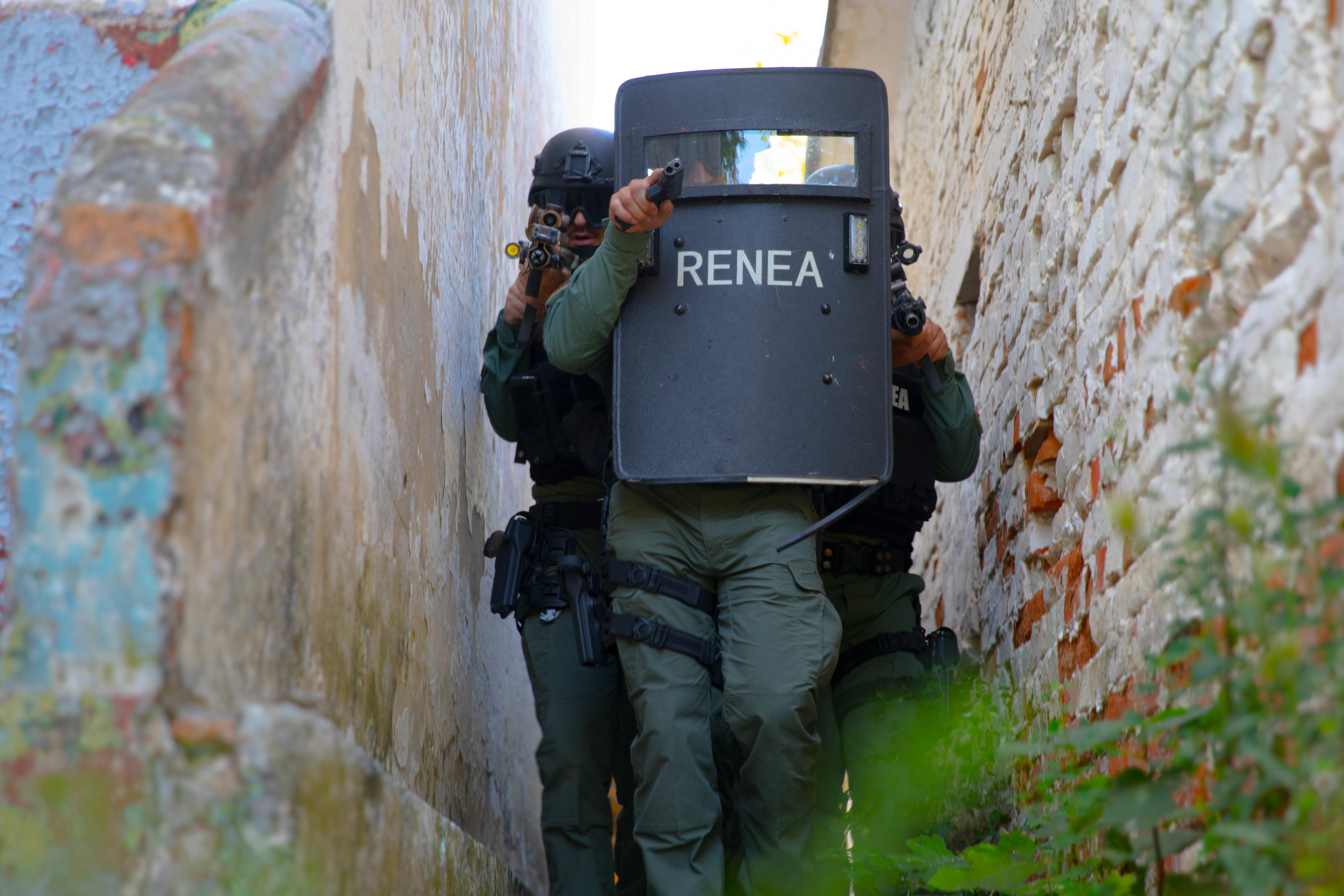
RENEA Operatives during Training Exercise

=== Weaponry ===
Since 2017, the Government of Albania has contracted with several countries to procure new firearms, replacing the outdated weapons from the Communist era. The list of weaponry used by the State Police below includes all firearms that have been in service with the Albanian State Police since 2010.

| Model | Type | Status | Origin Country |
|---|---|---|---|
| TT-33 | Semi-automatic pistol | Retired | Soviet Union |
| Makarov PM | Semi-automatic pistol | Retired | Soviet Union |
| Glock 17 | Semi-automatic pistol | In service | Austria |
| Beretta 92 | Semi-automatic pistol | In service | Italy |
| Beretta PX4 Storm | Semi-automatic pistol | In service | Italy |
| Beretta APX | Semi-automatic pistol | In service | Italy |
| Heckler & Koch MP5 | Sub-machine gun | In service | Germany |
| Heckler & Koch UMP | Sub-machine gun | In service | Germany |
| Heckler & Koch MP7 | Sub-machine gun | In service | Germany |
| AKM | Assault rifle | In service | Soviet Union |
| ASH-78 | Assault rifle | In service | Albania |
| Beretta ARX 160 | Assault rifle | In service | Italy |
| HS Produkt VHS | Assault rifle | In service | Croatia |
| Heckler & Koch G36 | Assault rifle | In service | Germany |
| Heckler & Koch HK417 | Sniper rifle | In service | Germany |
| Sako TRG M10 | Sniper rifle | In service | Finland |
| Sako TRG-42 | Sniper rifle | In service | Finland |
| RPK machine gun | Machine gun | In service | Soviet Union |
| RPD machine gun | Machine gun | In service | Soviet Union |

=== Vehicles ===
Plenty of diverse vehicles have been bought from the Albanian Government.

While many police forces around the world, usually tend to stick with 2-3 car brands in their fleets, Albania has been known to have numerous car brands in their police fleets, with the most popular car brand being Hyundai.

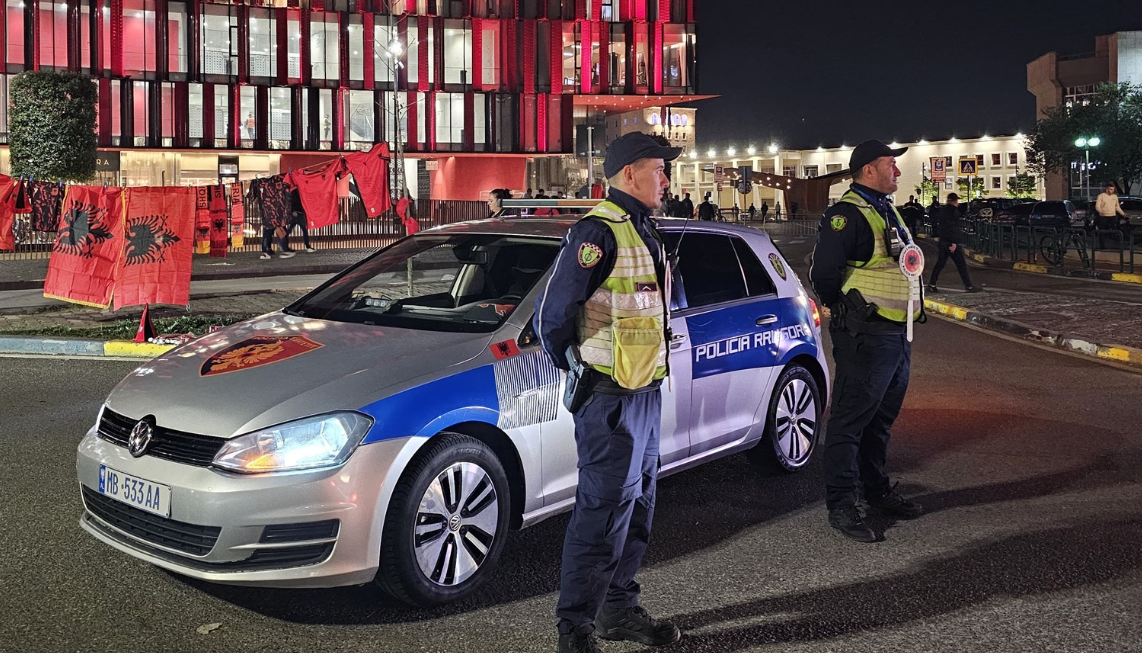
Traffic Police with Volkswagen e-Golf

It is worth mentioning that the State Police other than from having brand new purchased vehicles for police use, they also have impounded or confiscated vehicles converted to police vehicles, with those specific brands being Mercedes-Benz, Audi and BMW. They are exclusively mentioned in the list below.

Here is a full list of the vehicles used and currently in use by Albanian State Police since 2010.

==== Current ====
| Vehicle | Use/Type | Class | Origin Country |
|---|---|---|---|
| Ford Focus | Regular Police | Car | United States |
| Škoda Octavia | Regular Police | Car | Czech Republic |
| Kia Sportage | Regular Police | Car | Republic of Korea |
| Hyundai Santa Fe | Regular Police | Car | Republic of Korea |
| Hyundai i30 | Unmarked Police | Car | Republic of Korea |
| Hyundai Kona | Regular Police | Car | Republic of Korea |
| Hyundai Tucson | Regular Police | Car | Republic of Korea |
| Volkswagen e-Golf | Regular Police | Car | Germany |
| Volkswagen Golf | Unmarked Police | Car | Germany |
| BMW 5 Series | Regular Police Confiscated Vehicles | Car | Germany |
| Mercedes-Benz GLC 63 Coupe | Regular Police Confiscated Vehicles | Car | Germany |
| Mercedes-Benz E-Class | Regular Police Confiscated Vehicles | Car | Germany |
| Mercedes-Benz GLA | Regular Police Confiscated Vehicles | Car | Germany |
| Audi A6 | Regular Police Confiscated Vehicles | Car | Germany |
| Audi A8 | Regular Police Confiscated Vehicles | Car | Germany |
| Land Rover Discovery | DFPO Vehicles | Car | United Kingdom |
| Ford Transit Custom | Regular Police | Mini-Van | United States |
| Hyundai i800 | Regular Police | Van | Republic of Korea |
| Volkswagen Transporter | Regular Police | Van | Germany |
| Mercedes-Benz Sprinter | FNSH or RENEA Vehicles | Van | Germany |
| Aprilia RS660 | Regular Police | Motorcycle | Italy |
| BMW R 1250 RT | Regular Police | Motorcycle | Germany |
| Suzuki V-Strom 650 | Regular Police | Motorcycle | Japan |
| Iveco VM 90 | FNSH or RENEA Vehicles | Utility Vehicle | Italy |
| Land Rover Defender | FNSH or RENEA Vehicles | Utility Vehicle | United Kingdom |
| Mil Mi-8 | FNSH or RENEA Vehicles | Helicopter | Soviet Union |
| Bell 212 | FNSH or RENEA Vehicles | Helicopter | United States |
| AS350B | FNSH or RENEA Vehicles | Helicopter | France |
| Zodiac Nautic | FNSH or RENEA Vehicles | Boat | France |

==== Retired ====
| Vehicle | Class | Origin Country |
|---|---|---|
| Chevrolet Aveo | Car | United States |
| Hyundai Accent | Car | Republic of Korea |
| Dacia Sandero | Car | Romania |

== General Directors (1913–present) ==
| No. | Name | Term in office |
| 1 | Halim Gostivari | 13 January 1913 | 24 May 1913 |
| 2 | Fehim Mezhgorani | 24 May 1913 | 30 January 1914 |
| 3 | Hil Mosi | 1 February 1914 | 30 March 1914 |
| 4 | Veli Vasjari | 1 April 1914 | 30 June 1914 |
| 5 | Sulejman Kërçiku | 2 October 1914 | 27 January 1916 |
| – | Halim Gostivari | 28 August 1919 | 17 December 1920 |
| 6 | Ahmet Sinani | 17 December 1920 | 10 January 1922 |
| – | Veli Vasjari | 11 January 1922 | 22 April 1922 |
| – | Halim Gostivari | 22 April 1922 | 21 August 1922 |
| 7 | Musa Çelepia | 21 August 1922 | 26 December 1922 |
| 8 | Hamza Isaraj | 10 December 1924 | 25 December 1924 |
| 9 | Qazim Bodinaku | 24 February 1926 | 7 July 1926 |
| 10 | Rustem Ymeri | 20 December 1926 | 1927 |
| – | Hil Mosi | 3 September 1928 | 1929 |
| 11 | Zef Kadarja | 31 August 1940 | 23 March 1942 |
| 12 | Theodor Stamati | 24 March 1942 | 26 November 1942 |
| 13 | Shyqyri Borshi | 26 November 1942 | 4 June 1943 |
| 14 | Gjush Deda | 4 June 1943 | 30 August 1943 |
| 15 | Kolë Radovani | 1 September 1943 | 13 October 1943 |
| 16 | Skënder Selmanaj | 15 October 1943 | 10 January 1944 |
| 17 | Tahir Kolgjini | 10 January 1944 | 24 November 1944 |
| 18 | Namik Xhafa | 24 November 1944 | 20 March 1947 |
| 19 | Lako Polena | 24 March 1947 | 2 February 1948 |
| 20 | Sali Ormeni | 16 February 1948 | 2 March 1951 |
| 21 | Maqo Çomo | 2 March 1951 | March 1952 |
| 22 | Delo Balili | March 1952 | 1 May 1956 |
| 23 | Xhule Çiraku | 1 May 1956 | February 1968 |
| 24 | Kasëm Kaso | February 1968 | January 1980 |
| 25 | Agron Tafa | January 1980 | August 1982 |
| – | Kasëm Kaso | August 1982 | 31 December 1984 |
| 26 | Dilaver Bengasi | 1 January 1987 | 17 July 1990 |
| 27 | Pandeli Lluka | 17 July 1990 | 1 May 1992 |
| 28 | Astrit Mehaj | 1 May 1992 | 22 June 1993 |
| 29 | Sabri Jacaj | 22 June 1993 | 15 June 1995 |
| 30 | Agim Shehu | 15 June 1995 | 30 June 1997 |
| 31 | Sokol Baraj | 3 July 1997 | 16 May 1998 |
| 32 | Besnik Bregu | 16 May 1998 | 4 September 1998 |
| 33 | Hasan Ahmetaj | 4 September 1998 | 9 November 1998 |
| 34 | Veton Gjoliku | 9 November 1998 | 20 January 1999 |
| 35 | Veli Myftari | 20 January 1999 | 22 November 2000 |
| 36 | Bilbil Mema | 23 November 2000 | 19 August 2002 |
| 37 | Bajram Ibraj | 12 September 2002 | 30 March 2007 |
| 38 | Ahmet Prençi | 30 March 2007 | 28 October 2009 |
| 39 | Hysni Burgaj | 28 October 2009 | 9 September 2013 |
| 40 | Artan Didi | 10 October 2013 | 31 March 2015 |
| 41 | Haki Çako | 15 April 2015 | 8 January 2018 |
| 42 | Ardi Veliu | 5 February 2018 | 8 October 2021 |
| 43 | Gledis Nano | 8 October 2021 | 31 August 2022 |
| 44 | Muhamet Rrumbullaku | 8 September 2022 | 5 September 2024 |
| 45 | Ilir Proda | 2 October 2024 | 1 March 2026 |
| 46 | Skënder Hita | 30 March 2026 |

== See also ==
- Law enforcement in Albania
- General Directorate of Civil Emergencies
- Sigurimi
- Albanian police raids MEK camps
