= Halim Jakova-Gostivari =

Albanian politician

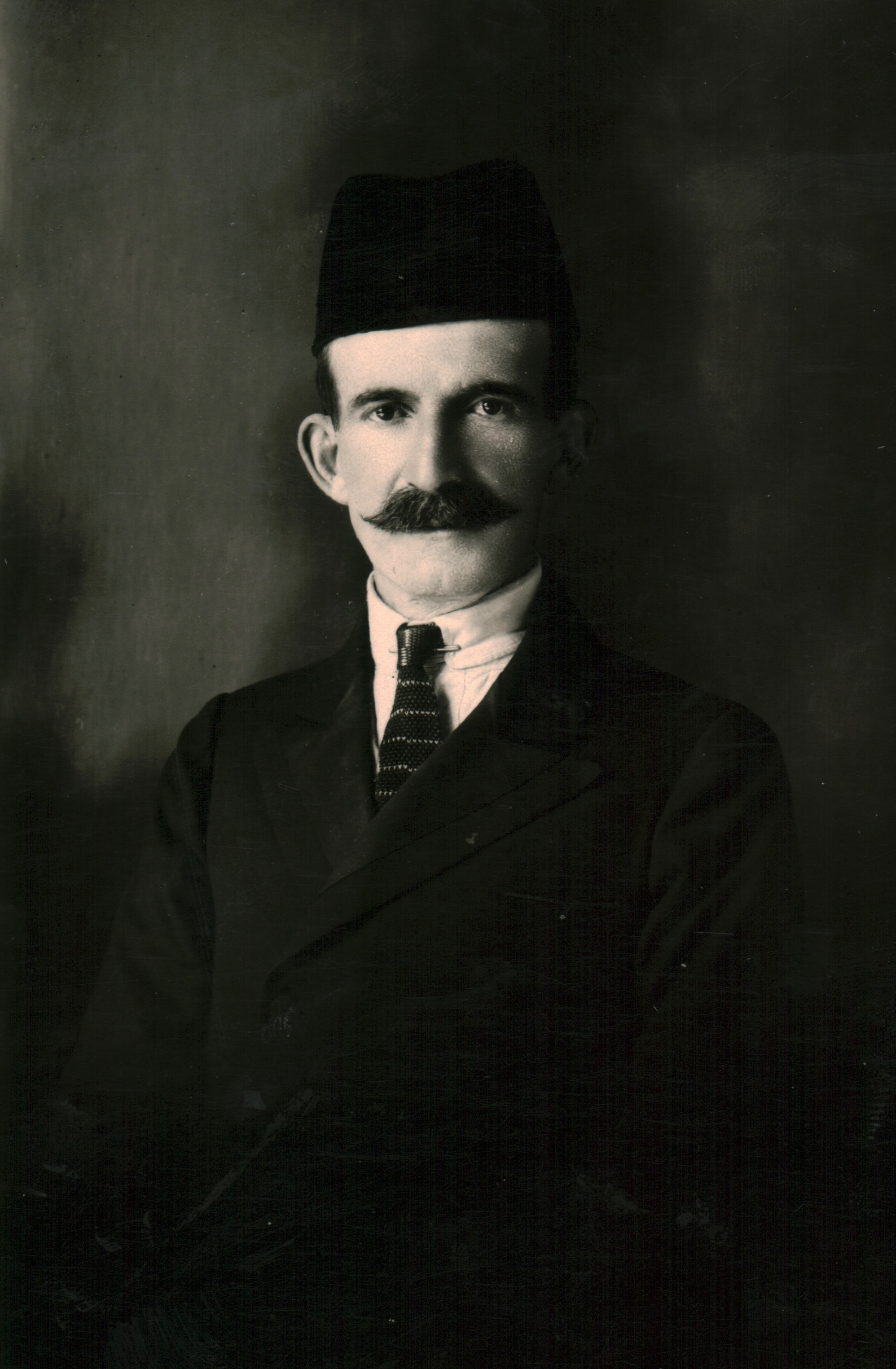
- Halim Jakova-Gostivari

1st Director of the Albanian State Police
- In office 13 January 1913 – 24 May 1913
- Preceded by: Office established
- Succeeded by: Feim Mezhgorani
- In office 28 August 1919 – 17 December 1920
- Preceded by: Sulejman Kërçiku
- Succeeded by: Ahmet Sinani
- In office 22 April 1922 – 21 August 1922
- Preceded by: Veli Vasjari
- Succeeded by: Musa Çelepia

Personal details
- Born: 1878; Gjakovë, Vilayet of Kosovo, Ottoman Empire
- Died: 1 August 1927 (aged 48–49); Korçë, Albania

Halim Jakova-Gostivari (1878–1927) was an Albanian politician, lawyer and public official who served as the first director of the Albanian State Police, a post which he held for three separate terms.

== Early life ==
Jakova-Gostivari was born in 1878, in Gjakovë, Vilayet of Kosovo (then Ottoman Empire) to parents Jusuf and Minushe Jakova (Gostivari). He completed his primary education in his hometown, while in 1905 enrolled as a student at the American institution Robert College in Istanbul, where he graduated in law.

== Political activism ==
In August 1908, Jakova-Gostivari supported Hasan bey Prishtina and the group that formed the "Bashkimi" club, based in Skopje. In May 1912, Malësia e Hasit and Reka plain voted him as an MP in the elections for the Turkish parliament, a parliament that never came to fruition due to the developments in the Balkans at the time.

Jakova-Gostivari contributed in organizing the Albanian revolt of 1912, which was highlighted by his participation at the assembly of the national forces in Junik, between May 21–25, 1912.

== Career ==
Having been recognized for his contribution to the police services and in legal affairs, the government of Ismail Qemali appointed him General Director of Police in the newly formed Albanian State.

Flag of the Committee for the National Defence of Kosovo

Jakova-Gostivari became a member of the Committee for the National Defence of Kosovo, which drafted in early 1919 a "protest note" sent to the Foreign Ministers of the Great Powers and General d'Espèrey, commander of the allied forces in the Balkans, regarding the Serbian massacres in Kosovo. This document was published in French, in the newspaper "Populli", signed by Bedri Pejani (secretary) and Hoxha Kadri (president). Due to his connections with Hoxha Kadri, chairman of the "MCR" Committee and Minister of Justice in the government cabinet headed by Sulejman Delvina, Jakova-Gostivari was reappointed as "General Director of Police" and shortly after as deputy prefect of the Tirana sub-prefecture, as soon as it was declared the administrative capital of Albania.

On December 17, 1920, on the proposal of the Minister of Interior, Xhafer bey Ypi, Jakova-Gostivari was dismissed from his post having been replaced by lawyer Ahmet Sinani from Elbasan. On December 20, 1920, he signed under the interim position of "Director of the Civil State", with Yzedin Beshiri as his deputy. By the end of April 1922, he was appointed inspector at the "Ministry of Internal Affairs". After the dismissal of police director Veli Vasjari, Ahmet Zogu, terribly frightened by the situation created in March 1922, decided to call back in charge of the Police his former loyalist, Halim Jakova-Gostivari, naming him "Deputy Director General of Police", where he would remain there until August 21, 1922.

From 1922 to 1923, he was elected deputy of the Prefecture of Kosovo, serving at the National Council. A few months later, on September 25, 1923, he would leave the "Popular Party" along with eight other deputies.

Halim Jakova-Gostivari was elected as a delegate representing Kolonjë at the Muslim Congress which took place from February 23 until March 14, 1923.

He died on August 1, 1927, at the age of 49.
