= Shqiponjat (police unit) =

Police unit

Team Eagle Skuadra Shqiponjat
- Official Patch
- Common name: Shqiponjat

Agency overview
- Formed: 15 May 2013

Jurisdictional structure
- National agency (Operations jurisdiction): Albania
- Operations jurisdiction: Albania
- Legal jurisdiction: As per operations jurisdiction
- Governing body: Albanian State Police
- General nature: Local civilian police

The Eagles (Albanian: Shqiponjat) also known as Team Eagles (Skuadra Shqiponjat) is a quick intervention unit of the Albanian State Police.

== History ==
The Eagles were created in 2006 by the idea and the direct support of Mr. Muhamet Rrumbullaku (Police Director of Tirana at the time) disbanded in 2013 but were quickly reinstated in 2014.

== Capabilities ==
They are the most specialized quick intervention unit after RENEA and FNSH.

== See also ==
- Albanian Police
- RENEA
