= Lazarat =

- Administrative unit
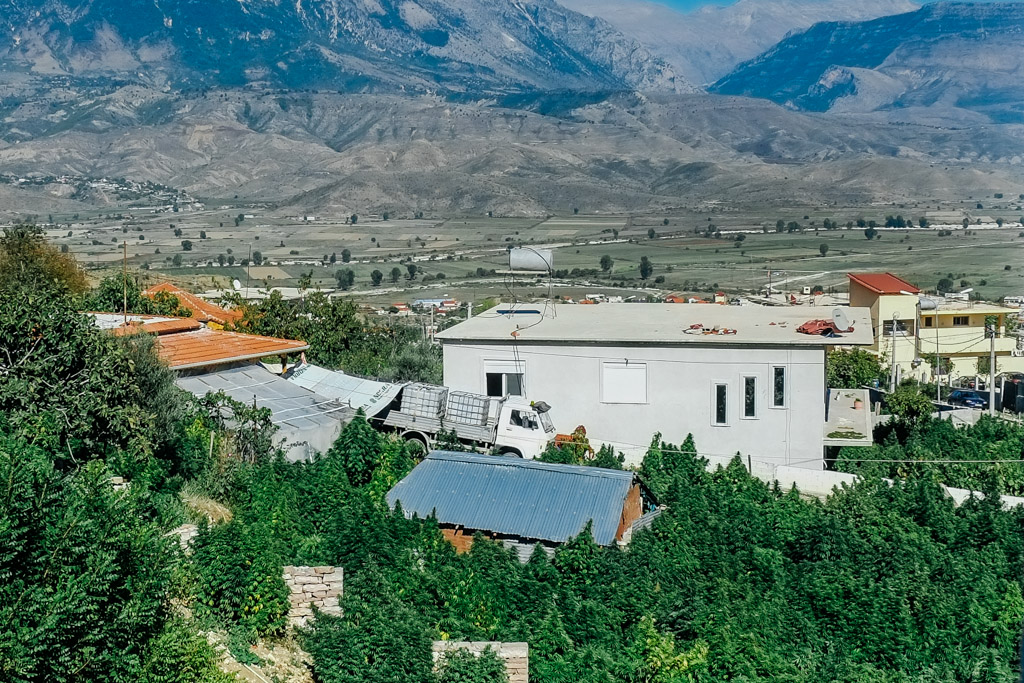
- Lazarat

- Location within Albania
- Coordinates: 40°3′N 20°9′E
- Country: Albania

Population (2011)
  - Administrative unit: 2,801
- Time zone: UTC+1 (CET)
  - Summer (DST): UTC+2 (CEST)
- Postal Code: 6004

Lazarat (Albanian definite form: Lazarati) is a village in Gjirokastër County, in southern Albania. It is located in the Dropull valley. Formerly functioning as a municipality, as part of the 2015 local government reform, it became a subdivision of the municipality of Gjirokastër. The former municipality consisted of the villages Lazarat and Kordhocë.

The population at the 2011 census was 2,801.

In recent years, Lazarat had gained the reputation as the cannabis capital of the country due to its large scale growth of cannabis by the local population. However, in June 2014, the Albanian government cracked down and destroyed the local production and transit of the drug.

== Name ==
Its name contains the Albanian suffix -at, widely used to form toponyms from personal names and surnames. The founder of the village was Lazar hence the name Lazarat. Lazarat is official name used by Albanian Government, but it's pronounced as Lazërati, also often written Lazerati.

== Geography ==
Lazarat is a village just outside Gjirokastër, situated on mountain slope of Mali i Gjerë.

Amidst the socio-political turbulence of the late eighteenth century in the area, Lazarat had bandits and it became a shelter for outlaws and criminals.

Since the Albanian Government's attempts to stop the illegal cultivation of cannabis, there have been a growing number of activists from around the region demanding a special status for the small commune. The activists demand the right to legalize production and selling of cannabis inside municipality borders. The Albanian government has rejected the demand.

== Crime ==
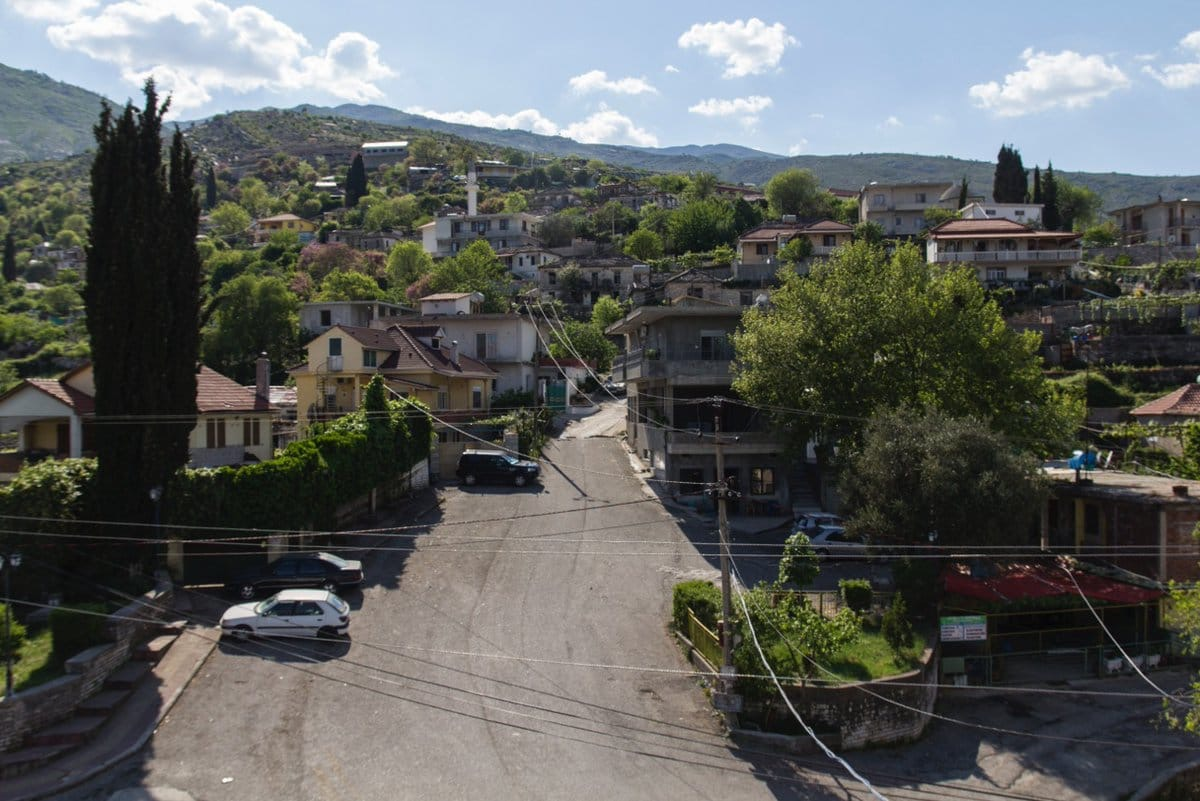
Lazarat in 2020

In June 2014, Albanian police launched a major operation against the village, involving over 800 officers. Heavily armed locals shot RPGs and fired mortar rounds at the officers, who returned fire. Police took control of most of the village, with Interior Minister Saimir Tahiri saying the operation would continue until "every square centimetre in Lazarat is under state control". Smoke rose from the village as locals reportedly burned cannabis plants.

On 24 June 2015, a member of the Albanian counter-terrorist force RENEA was shot and killed in the town, and two other soldiers wounded. A car containing gunmen had been stopped at a checkpoint, with attackers then opening fire on the soldiers from a nearby house. Ibrahim Basha was a RENEA officer who had previously served with NATO in Afghanistan. The United States Ambassador to Albania, Donald Lu, expressed condolences at the soldier's funeral, calling the incident a "national tragedy". Additional police and RENEA officers were sent to reinforce the town and locate the attackers.

== Population ==
Lazarat is inhabited by Muslim Albanians, many of whom have traditionally been Bektashi. The villagers speak with the Tosk dialect of the Albanian language.

== Economy ==
The main activity is agriculture, especially animal husbandry. The area is known for its dairy products.

== Popular culture ==
The eponymous film The Brave (2019) (previously Lazarat) is centred on the conflict between locals and the police.

In 2017 rapper Sin Boy wrote a song named Lazarat about the trafficking of pot from Lazarat to Greece
