= Rapid Intervention Force (Albania) =

Police force

Rapid Intervention Force Forcat e Ndërhyrjes së Shpejtë
- Official patch
- Abbreviation: FNSH

Agency overview
- Formed: 22 January 1992

Jurisdictional structure
- Governing body: Albanian Police

The Rapid Intervention Force (Albanian: Forcat e Ndërhyrjes së Shpejtë, FNSH) is the reserve force of the Albanian State Police which is tasked to carry out special security operations and resolve situations that can not be overcome by other police services, the execution of which requires specially prepared and equipped personnel. FNSH offers assistance in cases of civil emergencies and accidents for the protection of life and property.

== See also ==
- Albanian Police
- RENEA
