= Beretta APX =

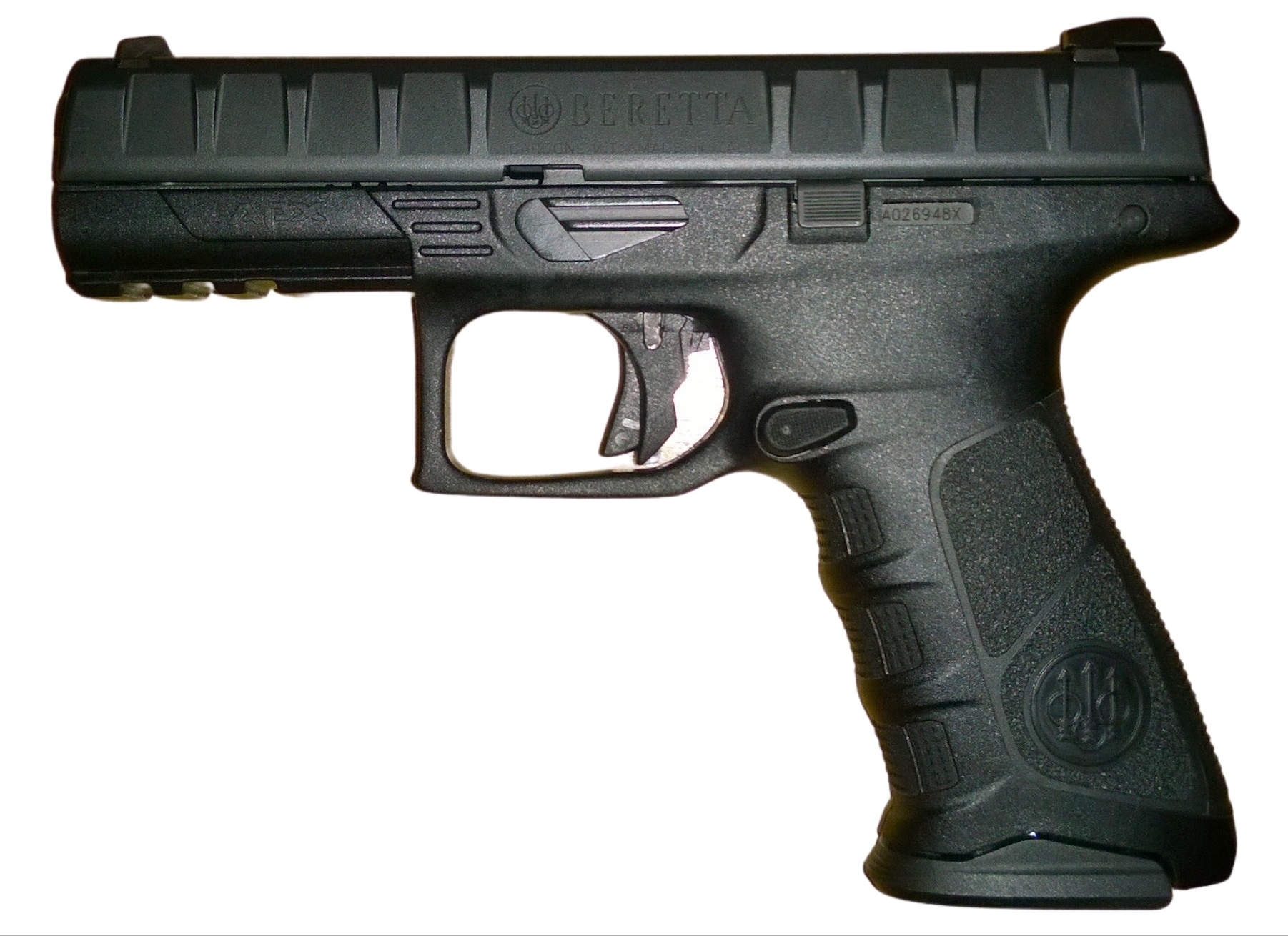
- Beretta APX first generation model with 17-round magazine
- Type: Semi-automatic pistol
- Place of origin: Italy

Production history
- Designer: Beretta
- Designed: 2016
- Manufacturer: Beretta
- Unit cost: $499
- Produced: 2016–present
- Variants: APX A0: APX RDO, APX Combat, APX Target, APX Centurion, APX Centurion Combat, APX Compact, APX Carry; APX A1: APX A1 Tactical, APX A1 Compact, APX A1 Compact Tactical, APX A1 Ported, APX A1 Carry

Specifications
- Mass: 800 g (1.8 lb) (9×19mm); 820 g (1.81 lb) (.40 S&W)
- Length: 192 mm (7.6 in)
- Barrel length: 108 mm (4.3 in)
- Width: 33 mm (1.3 in)
- Height: 142 mm (5.6 in)
- Cartridge: 9×19mm NATO; 9×21mm IMI.40 S&W
- Action: Locked breech, short recoil
- Feed system: 10, 15, 17, or 21-round detachable box magazine (9×19mm NATO); 15-round detachable box magazine (9×21mm IMI); 10, 13, 15, or 18-round detachable box magazine (.40 S&W)
- Sights: dovetailed 3-dot low profile or Trijicon Night Sights

The Beretta APX is a family of polymer-framed, modular, striker-fired semi-automatic pistols designed and produced by Beretta. The series began in 2016, starting with the full-size standard model. The line includes compact, concealed carry, and competition models. Most APX models have a decocker pin, preventing the need to dryfire when disassembling. The improved APX A1 series was introduced in 2022.

== History ==
=== APX (aka APX A0) ===
Designed largely for the U.S. Armed Forces' XM17 Modular Handgun System competition. Beretta had offered to provide their M9A3 model at a reduced price as a continuance of M9 procurement program, but were informed that the changes to the M9A3 were so significant that it fell outside the scope of an Engineering Change Proposal (ECP), and that the United States Department of Defense preferred to go through a new procurement instead. If the Beretta APX had won the MHS competition, it would have been manufactured in the Beretta factory in Gallatin, Tennessee.

The Army Times reported on January 19, 2017 that the winner of the MHS competition was the SIG-Sauer P320, but the APX performed well, passing every test in the competition. According to Beretta, the pistol can withstand a 45,000-round firing schedule with 5,000 rounds between stoppages. Soon after, on February 28, 2017, Beretta USA announced the APX availability for the US civilian market starting on April 15, 2017.

In 2018, three variants of the APX were announced: the APX Centurion, with a slightly smaller frame, slide and barrel, and the APX Compact, with a subcompact-sized frame, slide and barrel, and the APX Combat, with a threaded barrel and a mounting plate for optics on the slide. Beretta started selling frames with and without finger grooves in black, olive green, flat dark earth (FDE), and grey.

In 2019, Beretta lowered the MSRP of the APX from $499 to $399 in an attempt to be more competitive in the oversaturated polymer striker-fired market. That same year, in April, Beretta introduced the APX Carry, a single stack magazine variant intended for the concealed carry market. (The APX Carry is based on the Beretta Nano design with some design features incorporated from the full sized APX.) In July of that year, Beretta introduced three more designs, starting with flat dark earth variants of the Centurion and Compact models. The Centurion Combat was also introduced, which has a threaded barrel and mounting plate like the full-size APX Combat.

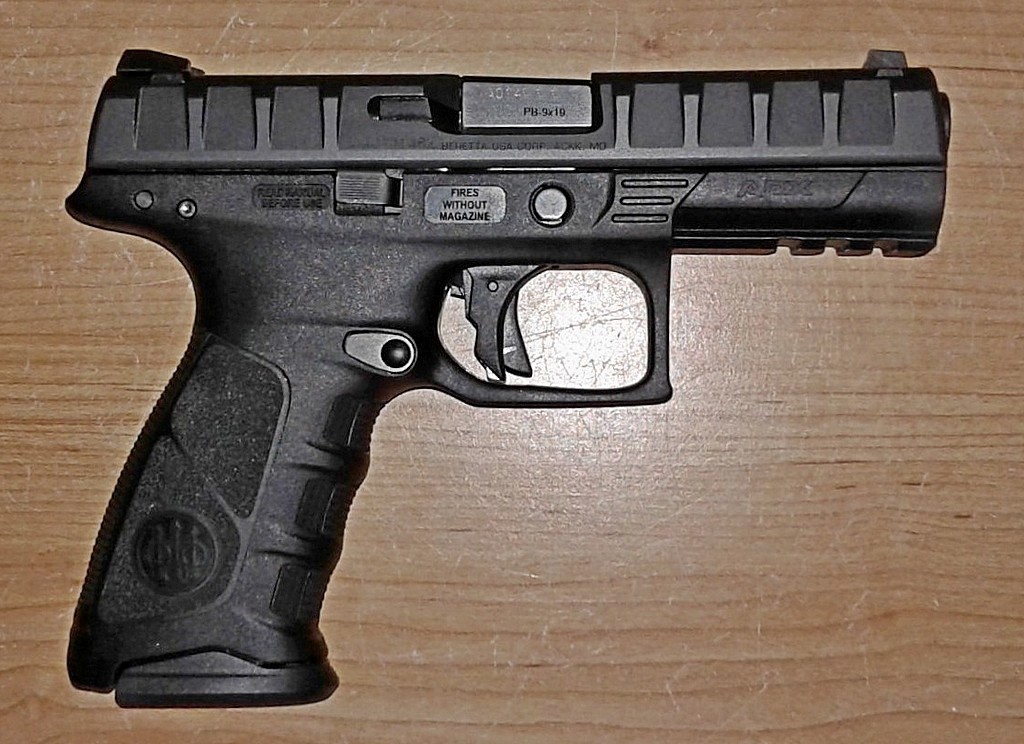
Beretta APX A0 Standard in 9×19 with 17-round magazine

Finally, the APX Target was introduced in 2020, which is a competition variant of the APX with a longer slide and 4.7-inch pre-tensioned barrel; these are fitted to each other at the factory to ensure greater accuracy. Erik Stern, the product manager at Beretta’s Pro Shop, said that the APX Target is a 20 to 30 percent more accurate than a standard full-size APX, adding "It’s the most accurate APX we’ve ever built". The slide also retained the optics-ready capability from the APX Combat and RDO models, but the sights have been changed to a fiber-optic front sight and a blacked out rear sight for competition. In addition to the changes to the slide and barrel, the frame is "wolf grey" colored and also has no finger grooves to better suit the needs of competition shooters. The frame also features an extended magazine release and slide stop, as well as a green striker guide for a competition trigger. The APX Target trigger is half a pound (~2.2 N) lighter than a standard model and has a shorter reset. The APX Target also came with four 17-round magazines, because competitive shooters need more magazines for use in matches. The APX Target was a very limited production model, but is significant because it was effectively the basis for the APX A1 line.

As of January 2024, Beretta still manufactures the first generation APX to fulfill existing contracts with military and police agencies, though only the A1 models are available on the civilian market.

=== APX A1 ===
Beretta APX A1 Carry in 9×19 with 8-round magazine

In May 2022, Beretta announced the APX A1, an ergonomically improved standard APX designed by Giovanni Prandini. The two main differences in the design are the slide and frame construction. The slide has deeper and more aggressive slide serrations that are more conventional, and the frame has a higher, undercut trigger guard and an enhanced beavertail. Many of the improvements were taken directly from the competition-oriented APX Target, including the blacked-out rear sight, the red-dot standard slide, the lack of finger grooves on the frame and the competition striker and trigger assembly. Other improvements include Beretta's "Aqua Tech Shield" finish on both the slide and barrel, a stainless steel chassis and a heavier competition-grade flat recoil spring to reduce recoil. There are also no finger grooves on the APX A1 full size frame, though users may use the A0 frames with finger grooves due to parts interchangeability. Slides and other parts will also interchange between A0 and A1 models, however in order to ensure proper function, the A0 needs to use its original recoil spring.

Current APX A1 models include the standard full size, the APX A1 Tactical, APX A1 Compact (which has same dimensions as the APX A0 Centurion), APX A1 Compact Tactical, and APX A1 Carry (subcompact version). The APX A1 Tactical comes from the factory with three 21-round magazines, an olive-drab green frame, a threaded barrel and blacked-out suppressor height sights. In 2024, Beretta introduced a flat dark earth version of the APX A1 Tactical with a tan slide and frame, albeit with a black interchangeable back strap. The APX A1 Compact is the same as the APX A0 Centurion, but with all the improvements of the A1 and incorporating the fiber-optic front sight from the APX Target. The APX A1 Compact Tactical is identical to the A1 Compact but with the green frame, threaded barrel and suppressor height sights of the A1 Tactical. New production A1 full size models come with the fiber-optic front sight from the APX A1 Compact instead of the tritium front sight from older A1 models. The A1 Carry also now has the same disassembly lever as the other guns in the APX platform.

In August of 2026, Beretta released the "APX A1 Ported", with a single angled port in the barrel and seven ports machined into the slide. The front sight, equipped with high-visibility orange paint, is moved back on the slide so the gas can escape the top of the barrel. Because this ported configuration directs expanding gas upward, it reduces muzzle rise and felt recoil. This increases accuracy and the speed of follow-up shots for either competition shooting and personal defense. The APX A1 Ported was released in FDE, OD green and black color patterns, and is also equipped with oversized magazine and ambidextrous slide releases taken from the APX Target.

== Design ==
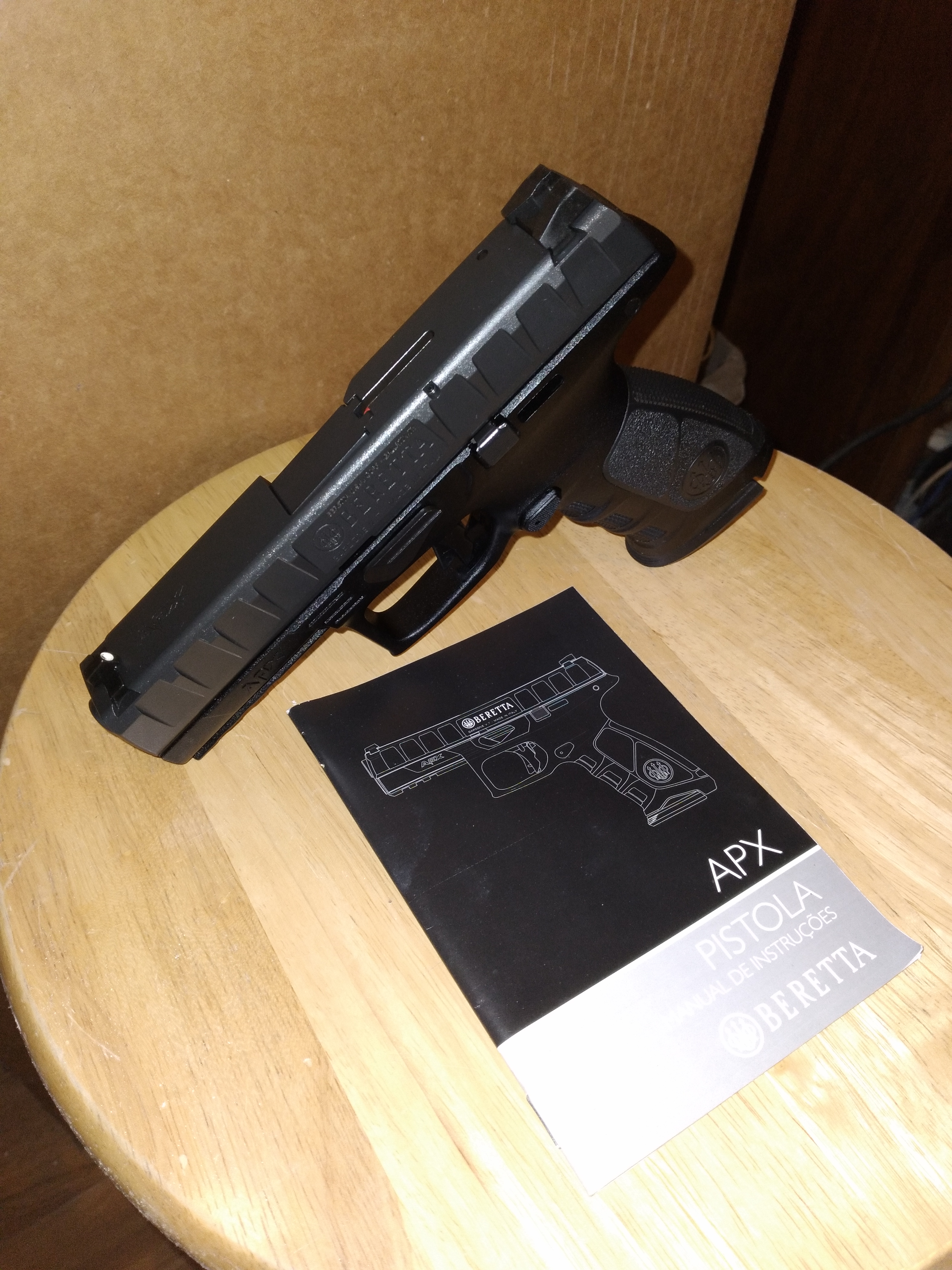
The Brazilian Police version of the Beretta APX. Note the loaded chamber indicator on the top of the slide and that the manual is in Portuguese.

The APX is Beretta's first striker-fired duty-sized handgun. The name APX refers to "Advanced Pistol X" (the "X" referring to a caliber of choice), as the firearm is fully modular and can change calibers and frame sizes somewhat easily. In order to comply with the MHS specification, the firearms must support different grip sizes to fit shooters of different stature. The APX has replaceable grip straps. The distance from the axis of the barrel to the top of the handgrip has been kept to a minimum of 21 mm (0.83 in) in order to reduce muzzle rise, which increases the ability to accurately fire quick follow-up shots. As specified in the MHS specification, the APX also features a MIL-STD-1913 rail under the front of the frame.

Unlike the Beretta 92 series, the APX uses the traditional Browning tilting-barrel short recoil design. The serialized part of the gun is a stainless steel chassis which allows true modular reconfiguration. by allowing the factory black frame to be changed with a number of different options, including flat dark earth (FDE), tan, wolf grey and olive drab. Replacement frames are also available without finger grooves. Initially, the slide and barrel are coated in a black nitride finish, except for a newer FDE model that has a cerakote FDE slide and black nitride barrel. APX A1s, on the other hand, use Beretta's "Aqua Tech Shield" finish that they first used on their shotguns, followed with a Bruniton coat on the slides.

Similar to Beretta's 92 and PX4-series pistols, when the APX A0's trigger is pulled, the top of the striker block safety extends from the top of the pistol. This serves as a visual indicator to the user that this safety is working properly and has been disengaged. The APX A1 has an optics plate instead of this feature.

Unlike a number of striker-fired pistols, such as the Glock, which have to have the trigger pulled during take down, the APX has a striker deactivation button that can be pushed to deactivate the striker, thus preventing accidental discharge, which other striker-fired pistols can suffer due to user negligence during disassembly. There is also an automatic striker block safety.

The trigger mechanism features a drop safety. If the pistol is dropped, this prevents inertia from causing the trigger to fire the weapon, thus preventing accidental discharge.

== Users ==
The APX is used in more than 20 countries.

- Albania: used by RENEA
- Brazil: Several different police forces operate the APX:
  - National Public Security Force: A total of 159,000 were purchased in 2020 for $69,000,000 for the National Public Security Forces and other regional agencies.
  - Military Police of Pará State: over 17.000 APX pistols acquired in 2025.
  - Military Police of Mato Grosso do Sul State: 6250 9mm pistols acquired by Mato Grosso do Sul to equip the PMMS.
  - Civil Police of Acre state: 300 pistols acquired in 2024.
  - Grupo de Operações Pénitenciárias: 800 pistols bought by the National Prison Department to equip the Grupo de Operações Penitenciárias, táctical operations group from the Penal State Police from the state of Ceará.
- France: Municipal Police of Béziers use the 9mm Parabellum variant.
- Indonesia: Used by Taifib (Amphibious Reconnaissance Battalion), Kopaska (Frogman Forces Command), Denjaka (counter-terrorism special operations force) of the Indonesian Navy; and Bakamla (Indonesian Maritime Security Agency).
- Italy: Italian Army, Italian police
- Poland: Purchased 4,600 pistols for the Poland National Police in 2019
- United States: Gallatin Police Department, Tennessee; Wetumpka Police Department, Alabama, Glendale Heights Police Department, Illinois
- Vietnam: Used by the Mobile Police Command.
