= Hil Mosi =

Albanian politician

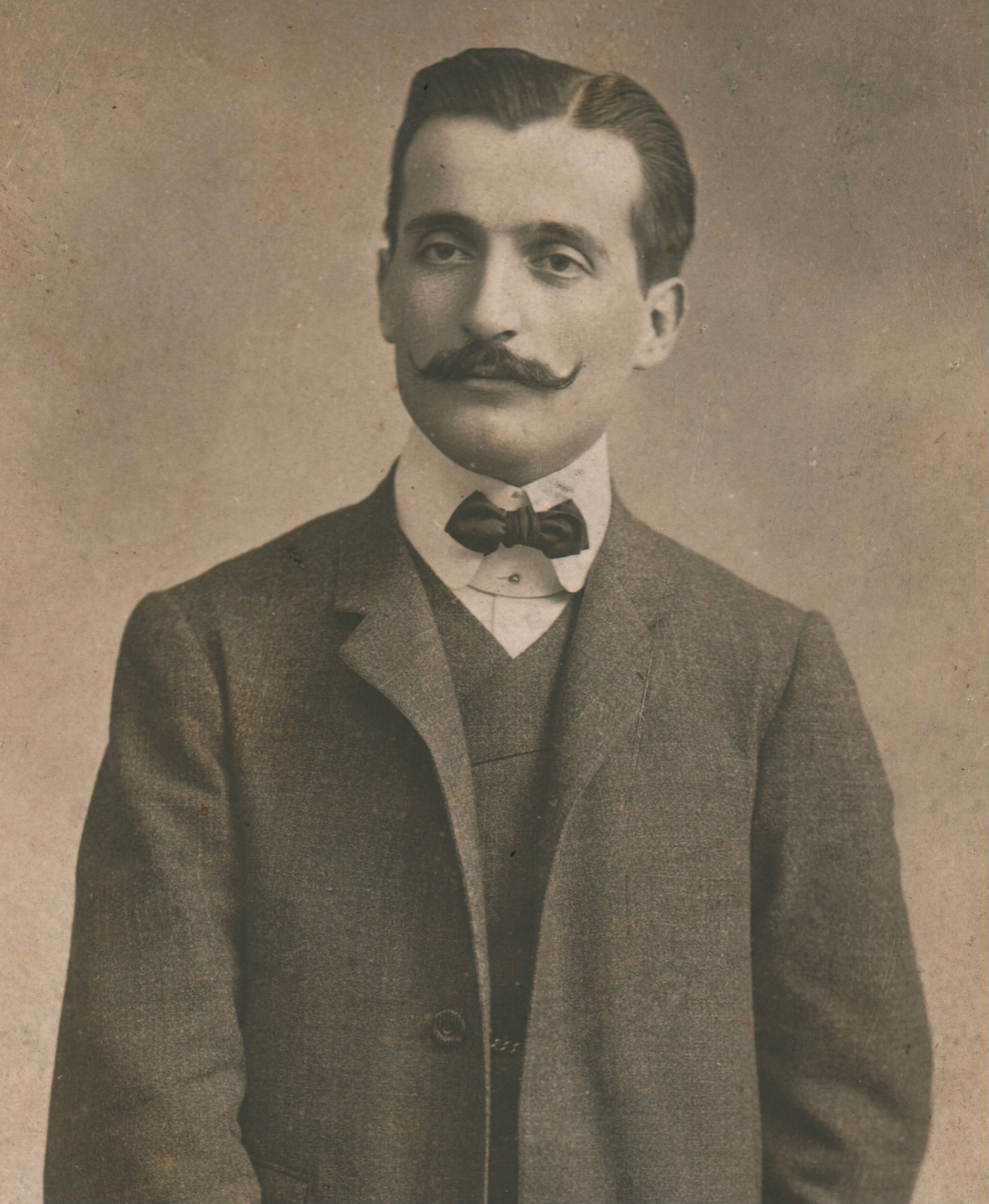
- Mosi, 1920s

3rd Director of the Albanian State Police
- In office 1 February 1914 – 30 March 1914
- Preceded by: Feim Mezhgorani
- Succeeded by: Veli Vasjari

Personal details
- Pronunciation: Also pronounced Hilë
- Born: 22 April 1885 Shkodër, Ottoman Empire (today Albania)
- Died: 22 February 1933 (aged 47) Tirana, Albania
- Parent: Mark Mosi (Father)

Hil Mosi (1885 - 1933) was an Albanian politician and poet.

== Biography ==
Hil Mosi, son of Mark Mosi, was born in Shkodër, then part of the Ottoman Empire, in 1885. He attended an Italian elementary school and later the Xavierian Shkodër Jesuit College before studying from 1904 to 1908 in Klagenfurt, southern Austria in order to become a teacher. In 1911, he took part in the Albanian uprising of northern Albania against Montenegro and the Ottoman Empire. In 1916 he became a member of the Albanian Literary Commission, and in 1920 a member of the Albanian delegation in the League of Nations. He was also a deputy of Shkodër from 1920 to 1924.

In 1924, Mosi was one of the main supporters of the revolution that overthrew the regime of Ahmet Zogu and established a democratic government. Fan S. Noli became the new Prime Minister, while Mosi served as a prefect of Korçë and Gjirokastër. After the restoration of Zog's regime he was initially exiled but returned to Albania in 1927 after amnesty was proclaimed and served anew in the government as minister of public works. In 1928, he served as director-general of public security and from 1930 until his death as minister of education.

== Work ==
Mosi's poetry contains mainly themes of patriotism and love. Most of his works were published between 1900 and 1925. His works include:

1. Këngat Shqipe (English: Albanian Songs), Thessaloniki, 1909.
2. Zan' i Atdheut (English: The Voice of the Homeland), Trieste, 1913.
3. Lotët e Dashtniës: Vjersha dashtnore (English: Tears of Love: Love poems), Shkodër, 1915-1916.
