= RENEA =

Albanian counter-terrorist response unit

Unit of Neutralization of Armed Elements Reparti i Eleminimit dhe Neutralizimit të Elementit të Armatosur
- Official patch
- Abbreviation: RENEA
- Motto: Tueri vitam cum nostram ipsorum vitam Protect life with our own life

Agency overview
- Formed: 1990
- Preceding agency: Unit 326
- Employees: 200

Jurisdictional structure
- National agency: Albania
- Operations jurisdiction: Albania
- General nature: Local civilian police
- Specialist jurisdiction: Counter terrorism, special weapons operations; protection of internationally protected persons, other very important persons, or state property

Operational structure
- Headquarters: Tirana, Albania
- Agency executive: Altin Dardha, Commander
- Parent agency: Albanian State Police

Notables
- Significant operation: 2014 Lazarat drug raid
- Award: Golden medal of the eagle

Website
- www.asp.gov.al

The Department of Neutralization of Armed Elements (Albanian: Reparti i Neutralizimit të Elementit të Armatosur) commonly known by its acronym RENEA, is the main Albanian counter-terrorist and critical incident response unit. The force was constituted in the early 1990s in response to the growing crime levels in the country after the fall of communism. RENEA's responsibilities are rescue operations, hostage situations, counter-terrorism and response to particularly violent forms of crime. Since 1990, the unit has lost four men in action and more than forty wounded. Their skills are highly regarded and well thought-of inside Albania and in the West, they are reported to have one of the highest OPTEMPOs (frequency of deployments) in all of Europe and they have been trained by GSG 9.

== Background ==
Following the emergence of capitalism in Albania after 1990 and in order to eradicate all semblances to and associations with the communist state, many investigators, attorneys and police officers were simply dismissed. This confused situation soon allowed organized and individual crime to flourish to the point that it soon became the norm of everyday life. Kidnapping, extortion, drug-related crime, murder and human trafficking were at an all-time high, and the Albanian fledgling democracy did not have the legal, administrative and organizational experience to combat these problems — in fact its infrastructure was almost non-existent. During communism, the force that was entrusted with CT and other special missions was Unit 326, but because of its role in suppressing public unrest during the popular uprising against communism, it had been neglected.

The new public order authorities recognised the need for a small professional force, and after exhaustive trials and training finally established what subsequently came to be known as RENEA. It was also known as Unit 88. It was composed of eighty members, or operatives, who were elected from the 600 original members of Unit 326. The rest of the operators joined subsequent special intervention groups that came into existence.

== Composition of the unit ==
The real number is secret but is estimated to be about 200 members. Initially, its organization was military in nature, dividing each team in groups of four, after the reputable British SAS system. In case of an open conflict, the police were expected to assume military duties. However, after the administrative reform of the Albanian Police, such duties were excluded from the police curriculum. Consequently, even RENEA was reorganized, this time modelling itself after sister units such as GSG-9, GIS, NOCS, GIGN etc. The tactics are still primarily SAS-based, but not the actual duties. The unit is composed of negotiators, infiltrators, divers, rock-climbing, sappers, snipers and a small nucleus of logistics operatives.

=== Structure ===
Organization:

- Support Command

1. Directory of Operational Movable Forces (F.L.O), first level (center):
2. Sector of planification and coordination of the operations
3. Sector of training

- Departments and Special Units, second level (base):

1. The department of neutralization of armed elements (RENEA)
2. The department of helicopters
3. Anti-explosive unit
4. Unit of negotiation

- Composition

1. Rapid reaction Unit Shkodra
2. Rapid reaction Unit Tirana
3. Rapid reaction Unit Fier

== Selection and training ==
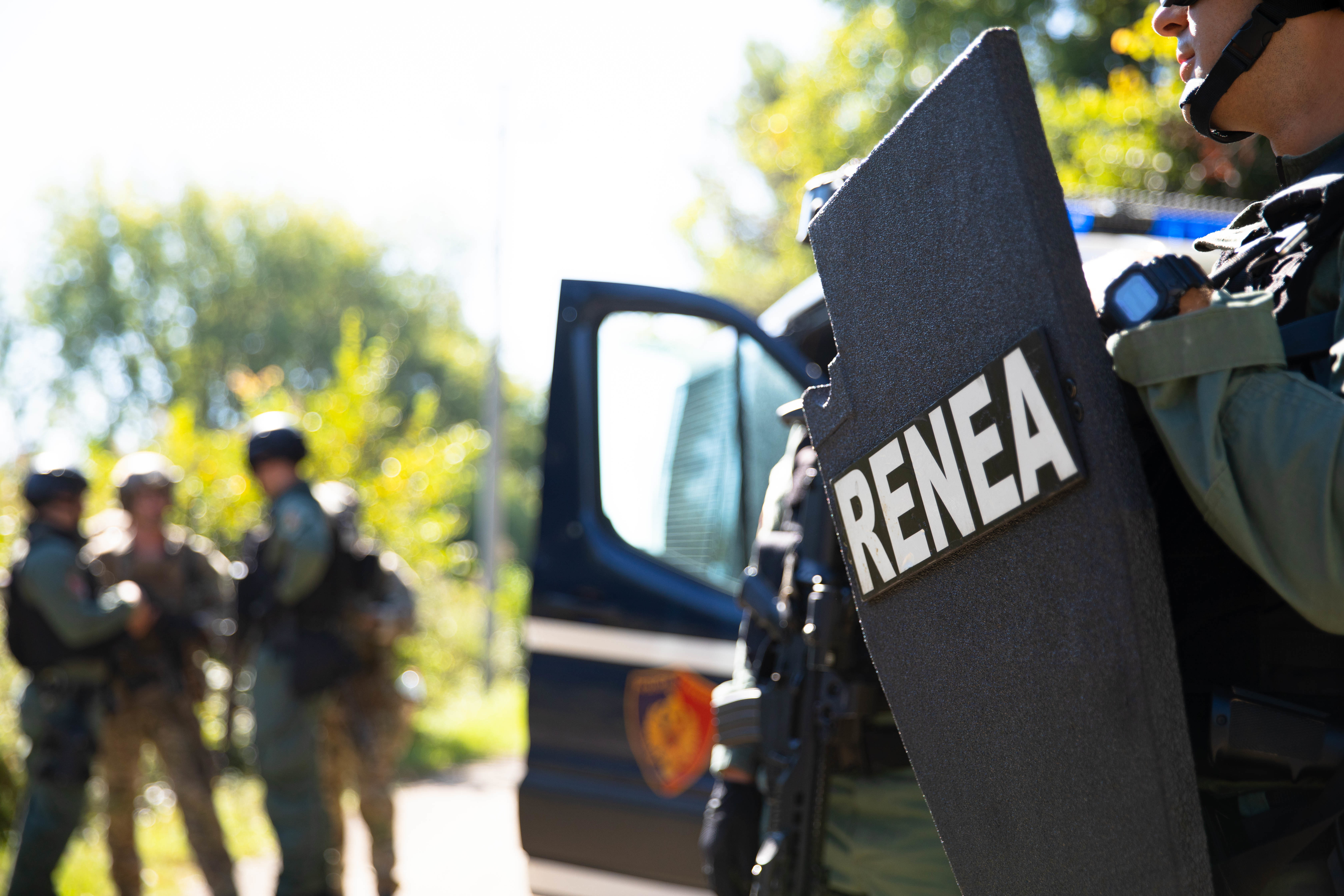
RENEA operatives during a 2010 public demonstration

In recent years, RENEA has been closely cooperating in the Training of their Operatives with the German GSG-9, as well as other Special Forces such as those from United Kingdom, France and Italy.

The selection process is held only once a year and lasts twelve weeks. Subsequently, recruits are trained for an additional nine months in other skills such as linguistics, signals, photography, and hostage negotiations. Candidates also continue undergoing strict psychological and physical tests. Only after a period of three years may the recruit become a RENEA operator cleared in participating in hostage rescue operations. About 90 per cent of candidates come from other branches of the Albanian State Police and the Albanian Republican Guard, while the rest are from the Albanian Army. The military candidates that pass selection must also complete a six-month course on jurisprudence. The maximum age for selection is 26 years and candidates are expected to have been members of their respective previous units for no less than two years. The first two weeks are called the "shake-down", in which almost everyone takes part. Only the negotiators and part of the logistics group (not including drivers) are exempted. Candidates undergo long and complicated psychological and durability tests designed to weed out weaker applicants. "Shake-down" is harsh, consisting of forced marches in full combat gear. True to their SAS origins, the operatives must carry a 35 kg (77 lb) backpack, ARX-160 with eight full magazines, handgun and magazines, knives, gas mask, and radio. Their training routes take part in the worst weather, in some of the toughest terrain that Albania has to offer: in the northeastern mountain range (the highest peak is Korabi, at 2,751 metres (9,025 feet)), the marshes of Vlora, and the swamps of Durrës and Lezha. Approximately 75 per cent of the candidates fail at this initial phase. The last day is reserved for infiltration tests. The candidates that have successfully accomplished the first phase are left helpless in some remote part of Albania, at a safe distance from the capital, with 200 commandos and national guardsmen at their heels. Each is expected to make it back to headquarters in Tirana unintercepted. If they are caught they go home. Training, preparation and tests change according to the whims of the instructors, who are themselves veterans of the unit. They have a reputation for being unyielding and unmerciful.

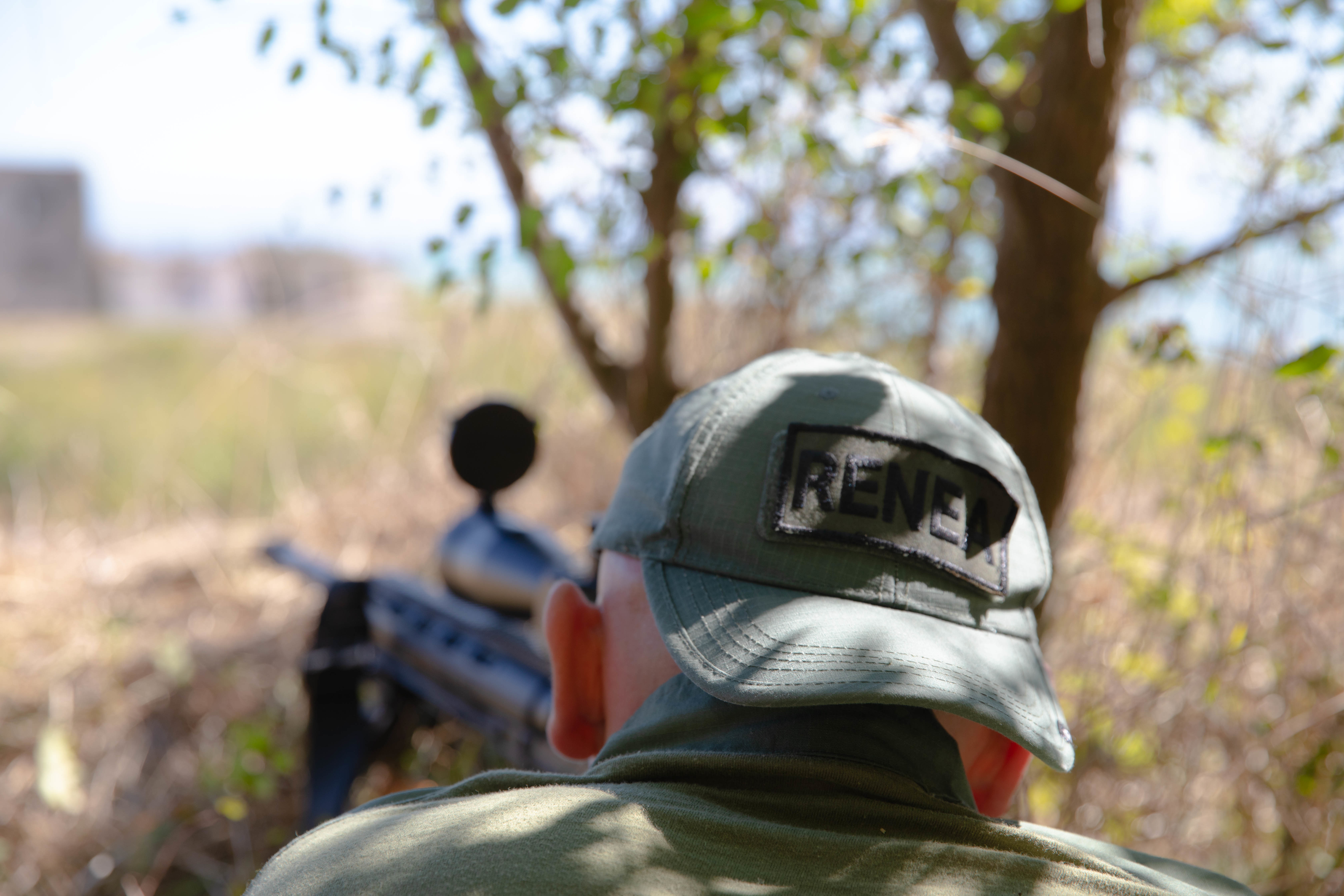

== The role of the negotiator ==
From 1991, the unit's negotiators have resolved, without resorting to violence, more than 500 of the 600 cases involving kidnappers and armed occupations.

All negotiators must have served for minimum of ten years with the police force and are persons of good temperament and mental balance, with knowledge of all dialects and regional mentalities. They all either have a degree in law or have attended the police academy. In addition they complete training courses with the FBI at Quantico FBI Academy and with other United States federal agencies. The negotiators are the first to intervene in cases of an occupation with or without hostages. Nobody intervenes without their explicit order, except in cases when the hostage is already dead.

== Notable missions ==
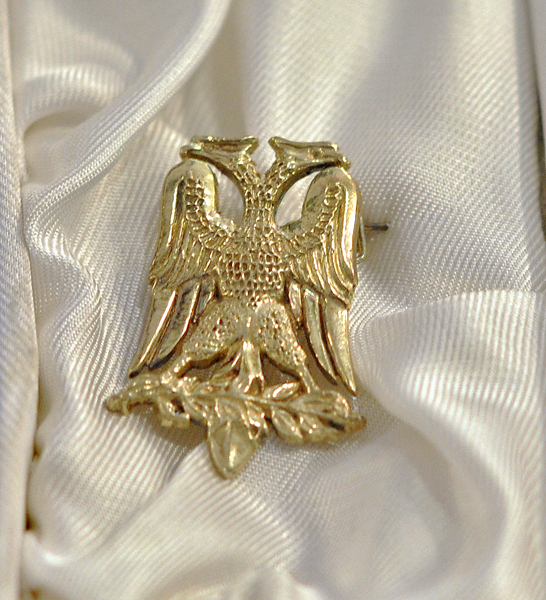
Golden Medal of the Eagle awarded to RENEA by the President of the Republic Albania

- January 1991: In riots at the Shenkoll (Saint Nicholas) maximum security prison, an armed prisoner took several guards hostage. The attention of national and foreign media was drawn to the crisis. The government of the time sent in Unit 326, the predecessor of RENEA, which quelled the riots using tear gas and rubber bullets, without bloodshed. One operative was lightly wounded in the process.
- November 1992: Albania was plagued by massive floods, which inundated many parts of the country. RENEA distributed food and provided shelter and medical assistance for the uprooted via speedboat and helicopter. One operative (killed in the line of duty in August 1993) selflessly dived into the icy waters and saved three drowning shepherds.
- April 1996: In a diplomatic high-level meeting between the Italian president Oscar Luigi Scalfaro and Sali Berisha in Tirana, a deranged individual armed with a grenade with the safety pin removed sought to approach the two presidents. The two officials were immediately taken away from the scene, while a RENEA negotiator steadily approached the perpetrator and made contact by twisting his arm, taking the grenade from his hand and putting the safety pin back on.
- January 1997: A female student in depressive state roamed the streets of Tirana with a grenade in her hand. A RENEA operator approached her and defused the situation without bloodshed.
- 1997: During the crisis that threw Albania in a state of anarchy as a result of the collapse of various pyramid schemes, where three quarters of the population lost their savings, RENEA was entrusted with the task of safeguarding the monetary and gold reserves of the National Bank and other financial institutions. RENEA accomplished the task by removing all valuables from the facilities in unarmed Iveco vans. No money was lost in the process. This operation, at a time when many police officers were killed by angry civilians, is remembered by the unit as Operation Kamikaze. During the same year, 90 per cent of all police stations were looted and taken over by armed individuals. RENEA retook possession of these facilities, recalled all officers to work, and re-established communications and security systems. In many cases, the operatives repaired all damaged property themselves.
- 1998–1999: During these years RENEA was engaged in fights with multiple gangs across the nation, which, as a result of the previous year's anarchy, were armed with weaponry ranging from personal equipment to artillery and anti-aircraft batteries looted from military depots.
- July 1998: The unit conducted a CT mission by arresting five Egyptian terrorists connected to Bin Laden's Al-Qaeda.
- March 1999: Three armed criminals murdered three police officers and four civilians. Subsequently, they barricaded themselves into a house, taking hostage a couple and their 7-month-old daughter. A RENEA team went in, freed the hostages, and neutralized the criminals.
- May 1999: An Albanian emigrant in Greece, disgruntled with his employer over payment matters, was deported after complaining to Greek authorities. After buying an AK-47 and two grenades, he returned to Greece and went to Thessaloniki, where he took hostage a bus carrying fourteen people. The Greek government gave him the $250,000 that he had asked for and allowed him to enter Albania with his hostages. Close to Tirana, the negotiators sought to convince him to let the hostages free. He wounded one and was killed in return by a RENEA sniper.
- 1999: Zani Çaushi, leader of one of the most ruthless Albanian gangs, was arrested. The same fate befell the senior leaders of many other gangs.
- 1999: A gang that had held hostage and then released a senior police official was arrested.
- 1999: Acting on the request of the Italian government, an individual suspected of the murder of three police officers in Udine was arrested. Although exonerated of this murder, the individual remained behind bars due to other criminal activities.
- 2000–2001: In three separate operations, three individuals sought for the murder of Azem Hajdari, an Albanian MP, were arrested. This mission was important because Hajdari was one of the most unorthodox and controversial leaders of the political opposition at the time.
- February 2001: During Operation Journey Italia, RENEA took credit for destroying an Albanian-American gang, which, in partnership with the Medellín drug cartel and Italian and Albanian mafia, was exploring the possibility of turning Albania into a major international launching pad for the trafficking of cocaine. RENEA arrested all suspects, including a former senior police officer.
- January 2002: RENEA destroyed a gang of narcotics traffickers, which was trafficking than 100 kg (202.5 lb) heroin per trip. More than 1,000 kg (2,205 lb) of pure heroin was confiscated.
- 1990–2004: During the last decade and a half, RENEA has provided escort security to such high-level officials as: former United States Secretaries of State James Baker and Madeleine Albright, Pope John Paul II, former British Prime Minister Tony Blair, Italian President Oscar Luigi Scalfaro, and various Italian and Greek prime ministers, in addition to Albanian officials and international officials in government missions in Albania.
- June 2014: RENEA in a combined operation with the Albanian Police put the rogue village of Lazarat under siege for a few weeks. Around 800 officers and police agents took part in the operation. RENEA operatives fought against drug traffickers armed with RPGs, AK-47s and other light weaponry. Dozens were arrested and tons of Marijuana and Heroin were confiscated and burnt. There were no casualties from both sides.
- June 2015: For the second year in a row, the village of Lazarat was put under siege after one RENEA operative was killed and two others were wounded. After an intense manhunt, both assailants surrendered.
- August 2018: RENEA was involved in a massive manhunt to arrest Ridvan Zykaj who killed 8 people in Vlorë. He was arrested by RENEA in the morning of 11 August.
- October 2018: During an operation by RENEA, the 35-year-old Greek Konstantinos Katsifas died on the mountainside over the village of Bularat, in Gjirokastër. He had helped organize the local commemoration for the anniversary of the Ohi Day on 28 October. His death was criticized by the Greek Foreign Ministry, calling it "unacceptable", and demanded a thorough investigation; Albanian Prime Minister Edi Rama followed by describing Katsifas as an "extremist". Katsifas allegedly opened fire on the Albanian police with an AK-47, prompting the RENEA forces to later intervene; it is reported that the reason he initially attacked, was either "for the sake of the Greek irredentist cause in Southern Albania", or because he had previously quarreled with a local police officer. The exact circumstances of his death are a matter of dispute. The judicial investigation of the case was assigned to the Prosecutor's Office in Gjirokastër. On 22 April and 13 September 2021, the Prosecutor's Office requested for the case to be closed, stating that Katsifas committed suicide; this was dismissed by the court of Gjirokastër, for failure of the Prosecutor's Office to provide sufficient evidence. On 13 December 2021, the court accepted the request and closed the case. According to Albanian forensic experts, Katsifas committed suicide and died of two wounds to the chest, caused by contact shots; RENEA's initial admission that it killed Katsifas wasn't taken into account. A Greek forensic expert who examined the body concluded that Katsifas died of two wounds to the chest from a distance of approximately 25 meters. The Public Prosecutor's Office in Athens also began its own investigation on 8 December 2019, due to Katsifas also being a Greek citizen.
- RENEA was called during the Flamingo Revolution on 17 October 2026, after originally peaceful protests turned violent on 13 October.

== Casualties ==
Since 1990, RENEA has suffered a total of five casualties, mostly during the 1990s, due to the lack of training and the rise of armed criminal organized groups that became sophisticated as well. Since 2015, no loss of life of an operative has been reported.

Casualty List
Operative	Rank	KIA	Notes
Luan I. Haxhiaj	Vice commissar	1990	
Lulezim R. Sulollari	Head Inspector	1991	
Arben N. Ujka	Inspector	1993	
Elam S. Elezi	Commissar	1998	
Ibrahim Basha	Inspector	2015	Killed during the aftermath of Lazarat Drug Raid

== Name ==
Loosely translated, RENEA stands for "Department of Neutralization of Armed Elements", whereby "RE" accounts for REparti (Departament), "N" for Neutralizimit (Neutralisation), "E" for Elementit (Element), and "A" for Armatosur (Armed). A common misconception is the addition of the word "Elimination" to account for the second "E". Therefore, the name would get a new meaning: "Department of Elimination and Neutralization of Armed Elements". In another version (received directly by one of the most representing members of the group previously called "repart 326") the first "e" of RENEA stands for "Energjike".

== Equipment ==
Weapons
Model	Type	Status	Origin Country
Glock 34	Semi-automatic pistol	Active	Austria
Heckler & Koch USP	Semi-automatic pistol	Active	Germany
Beretta 92FS	Semi-automatic pistol	Active	Italy
Beretta PX4 Storm	Semi-automatic pistol	Active	Italy
Beretta APX	Semi-automatic pistol	Active	Italy
Heckler & Koch MP5	Submachine gun	Active	Germany
Heckler & Koch UMP	Submachine gun	Active	Germany
Beretta ARX160	Assault rifle	Active	Italy
AKM	Assault rifle	Retired	Albania
ASH-78	Assault rifle	Retired	Albania
Heckler & Koch G36	Assault rifle	Active	Germany
HS Produkt VHS	Assault rifle	Active	Croatia
Sako TRG M10	Sniper rifle	Active	Finland
Sako TRG-42	Sniper rifle	Active	Finland
Heckler & Koch HK417	Sniper rifle	Active	Germany

Non-Lethal Weapons & Secondary Equipments
Model	Type	Status	Origin Country
S10 NBC Respirator	Anti-Gas Mask	Active	United Kingdom
Randall	Fighting Knife	Active	United States
PVS-14, PVS-31	Night Vision Goggles	Active	United States
Defense Technology	Pepper spray	Active	United States
M84 Stun Grenade	Flash-bang	Active	United States
FN 303	Semi-automatic less-lethal Riot Gun	Active	Belgium
3M Peltor ComTac Series	Headset Comms	Active	Sweden
Future Assault Shell Technology helmet	Helmet	Active	United States
EnGarde Body Armor	Heavy Bulletproof Kevlar Vest	Active	Netherlands

== Vehicles ==
Vehicles
Vehicle	Class	Origin Country
Mercedes-Benz Sprinter	Van	Germany
Land Rover Defender	Utility Vehicle	United Kingdom
Iveco VM 90	Utility Vehicle	Italy
Bell 212	Helicopter	United States
Mil Mi-8	Helicopter	Soviet Union
AS350B	Helicopter	France
Zodiac Nautic	Boat	France

== Trivia ==
The force has a mascot, a little three-legged dog called Triçikle (English: tricycle), who is considered to bring great fortune to the unit.

== See also ==
- EURALIUS, European Assistance Mission to the Albanian Justice System
