= Albania–Greece relations =

- Albania: Greece

Albania–Greece relations are diplomatic relations between Albania and Greece. They are influenced by factors such as the presence of Albanian immigrants in Greece, the Greek minority in Albania, historical and cultural ties, and interactions between the governments of both countries.

Both Albania and Greece are members of international organizations such as the Council of Europe and NATO, and share political views about the Balkans and the rest of the world. During the 2004 EU–Western Balkans Summit of Thessaloniki, Greece proposed the "Agenda 2014", which promoted the integration of all Western Balkan states into the European Union. On June 24, 2014, under the Greek EU presidency, Albania was granted official EU candidate status, coinciding with the 10th anniversary of "Agenda 2014".

Greece ranks as Albania's 15th-largest foreign investor. Alongside Italy, Greece has supported Albanian Euro-Atlantic integration efforts, such as Albania's entry into NATO in 2009. Cooperation between the two governments and business sectors spans fields such as energy, military, tourism, and culture, as well as bilateral projects like the Trans Adriatic Pipeline and hydroelectric power plants. Greece has also been Albania's largest donor and the leading donor for the National Theater of Albania.

Modern diplomatic relations between the two countries were established in 1971 and are currently considered positive. Despite shared common traditions, culture, history, and inter-ethnic relations, diplomatic tensions relating to the Greek communities in Albania and vice versa continue to influence perceptions in both countries. Current diplomatic issues between the two NATO states include the unresolved status of war between Greece and Albania, which persists after the Greco-Italian War in 1940, and the human rights issues faced by the Greek minority in Albania. Contrary to media portrayal and despite these factors, Albanians and Greeks continue to maintain relations in their respective countries. This is facilitated by efforts from academics, cultural groups, NGOs, ethnic minorities, mixed families, and other non-state actors to foster closer and stronger social and political ties.

== History ==
Both Albania and Greece claim autochthonous status in their respective countries and the wider Balkan region. This has led to a sense of shared kinship as well as contested claims throughout history.

Due to the close proximity of the two countries, European genetic research has shown that there is genetic similarity between Albanians and Greeks, as well as with other southern European populations, such as southern Italians and Cypriots.

Since the nineteenth century, both Albania and Greece have been separate nation-states. For at least twenty-two centuries prior, they belonged to the same state in different forms. The ancient Greek and Illyrian tribes that inhabited both countries were Indo-European groups that intermarried with pre-Hellenic populations after arriving in the Balkans about four thousand years ago. Then, as now, multiple migration events occurred between both countries and peoples. Greek colonies were established along the coast of Illyria, which corresponds to modern-day coastal Albania.

In the Middle Ages, Albanians, particularly those in the population group known as Arvanites, migrated across Greece. They established themselves throughout the country and played a role in the Greek War for Independence and the establishment of the modern Greek state. Other Christian Albanians took part in the Greek struggle against the Ottoman Empire.

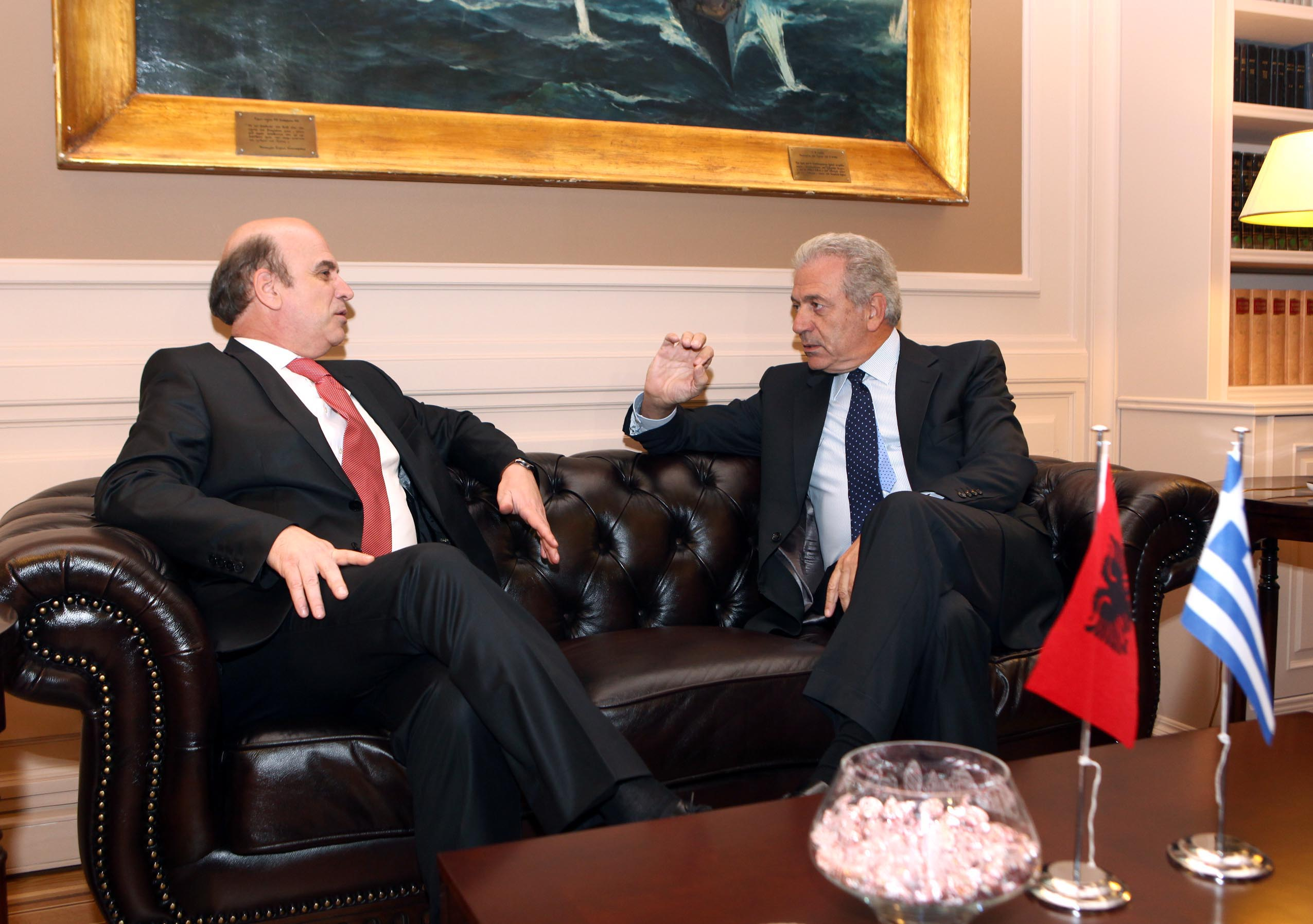
Foreign Minister of Albania Edmond Panariti (left) and Foreign Minister of Greece Dimitris Avramopoulos (right) in October 2012

After the Albanian Declaration of Independence from the Ottoman Empire (1912), the land division between Albania and Greece was resolved under the influence of the Great Powers (Austria-Hungary and Italy) with the Florence Protocol. Relations did not improve until the 1939 occupation of Albania by Italy. Greek and Albanian forces came into conflict during the Greco-Italian War. During the Axis Occupation of Greece, the Greek and Albanian resistance groups were in close contact, exchanging information about the Nazi occupation forces.

The People's Socialist Republic of Albania, an ally of the Soviet Union, was involved in the Greek Civil War (1946–1949) by supporting the communist-led Greek Democratic Army. Leskovik, in southern Albania, became its headquarters for some time. Several invasions were mounted from Albanian soil into the Greek region of Grammos, with communist guerrillas retreating to Albania after each operation. Negotiations leading up to the re-establishment of full diplomatic relations started in 1953, and a trade agreement was reached in Paris in 1966. However, the trade agreement was not implemented due to the absence of a payment agreement. In 1970, a new trade agreement was also reached in Paris, which led to the establishment of telegraphic and telephone lines and the opening of trade bureaus in Athens and Tirana. In early April of the same year, a truck carrying Albanian goods reached Greece via Yugoslavia—the first since the end of World War II. Following a lapse of more than 30 years, the two countries re-established diplomatic relations on May 6, 1971, in a period when economic cooperation and strategy led Enver Hoxha and the right-wing Greek military junta of 1967–1974 to explore paths of cooperation.

=== Confederation aspirations ===
During the Ottoman period, Albanians and Greeks made numerous discussions, research, and attempts to form a confederation. In the 19th century, plans were made to create a Greek-Albanian confederation, reviving earlier plans from the 18th century. In 1907, a special protocol and memorandum of understanding were signed by Neoklis Kazazis and Ismail Qemali, the first prime minister of Albania.

Arvanite author Aristides Kollias, in his book The Proclamation of the Association of Arvanites, states that "from 1881 to 1907, sustained efforts and repeated consultations between Greeks and Albanians were made to create a Greek-Albanian state."

In his book Greece and Albania in the Early 20th Century (1995), Thanos Paleologos-Anagnostopoulos wrote that Ismail Qemali, a philhellene, collaborated with numerous Greek politicians and lobbyists, including Arvanite leaders, on a possible Greek-Albanian federation. This federation was envisioned as one that "maintains the national and religious independence of the two peoples." Neoklis Kazazis viewed this federation as a means for Greece to counter Italian influence in the region.

=== 1990s ===
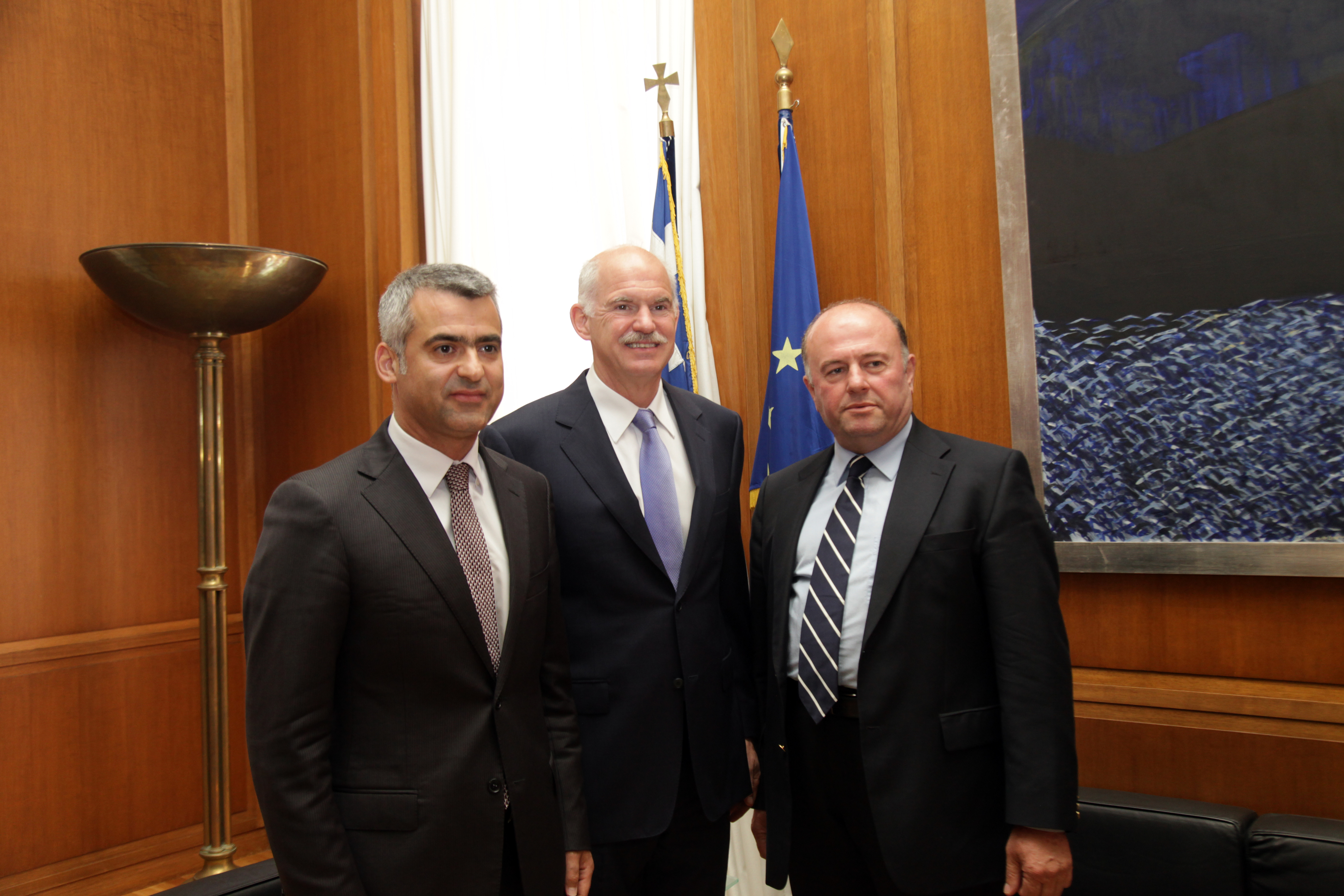
Greek PM Papandreou meets Unity for Human Rights Party leader Vangjel Dule and Omonoia leader Vasil Bollano

Following the collapse of communism in Albania in 1992, an influx of economic refugees and immigrants from Albania and other former Communist countries—including Bulgaria, Georgia, Moldova, Poland, Romania, Russia, and Ukraine—arrived in Greece. Most of these individuals entered Greece as illegal immigrants seeking employment. Albanians in Greece constitute 60–65% of the total immigrant population. As per the 2001 census, there are officially 443,550 Albanian citizens residing in Greece.

In the 1990s, Greece favored and supported Fatos Nano, an Orthodox Christian, as the Albanian leader over Sali Berisha, a Muslim. Nano was perceived as more amenable to Greek interests. During the Albanian Rebellion of 1997, Greece took part in Operation Alba, a multinational peacekeeping and humanitarian mission. Prior to Operation Alba, Greece executed "Operation Kosmas" on March 15, 1997, which involved the evacuation of 240 foreign dignitaries from Albania.

Presently, both countries describe their relations as 'excellent', with Albania considering Greece one of its 'strongest and most important allies'. Both nations are NATO member states and currently enjoy close relations. However, Greece opposed the route of the Trans Adriatic Pipeline through Albanian territory, as it would enable Albania to become a transmission hub for gas in the Western Balkans.

== Modern relations ==
On September 4, 2004, ethnic tensions escalated when Gramoz Palushi, an Albanian living near Zakynthos, was murdered by an ethnic Greek after celebrating Albania's 2–1 win over Greece in a football match. This led to widespread protests by members of the Albanian and anti-racist communities in Greece. In the Albanian capital of Tirana, youth organizations held rallies and marched to Mother Teresa Square to condemn the murder, while hundreds of people attended his funeral. The perpetrator, Panagiotis Kladis, was originally sentenced to life imprisonment. In early 2010, he had his sentence reduced to 22 years by the Greek courts.

On August 12, 2010, ethnic tensions escalated again following the death of Aristotelis Goumas, an ethnic Greek shopkeeper. Goumas was killed when his motorcycle was struck by a car driven by three Albanian youths. The youths had allegedly demanded that Goumas refrain from speaking Greek in his store. In response to the incident, local residents blocked the main highway between Vlorë and Sarandë in protest, and a spokesman called for a restructuring of local police services and an increased representation of Himariotes in the local police force. Both the Greek and Albanian governments condemned the incident.

Following the UEFA Euro 2016 qualifying match between Serbia and Albania, Albanian nationalists were armed with flags and banners. They attacked local ethnic Greeks, vandalized houses, and smashed car windows. This incident prompted diplomatic intervention from Greece, with the Greek foreign ministry issuing a démarche to its Albanian counterpart, demanding the prosecution of those responsible for the attacks. The Albanian foreign minister acknowledged the swift and efficient response of the state police in identifying the perpetrators.

Greece ranks as the 15th largest foreign investor in Albania, with investments totaling 217 million euros.

In August 2017, Albania experienced widespread wildfires. In response to a request for assistance from the Albanian authorities, Greece dispatched two Canadair CL-415 aircraft and seven fire engines, along with their crews, to aid in the firefighting efforts.

In the aftermath of the 2019 earthquake in Albania, Greece sent two Special Unit for Disaster Management (ΕΜΑΚ) teams comprising 40 members, search and rescue dogs, a convoy of trucks, and a C-130 airplane carrying food parcels. Greek Foreign Minister Nikos Dendias also visited Tirana. In addition, Greek doctors and medical supplies were dispatched to assist the affected civilians. The Greek army provided further support by sending three mobile military kitchens and their personnel. A team of 16 civil engineers was also sent to Albania. The Hellenic Red Cross contributed by sending over 200 tons of basic necessities.

During the COVID-19 pandemic, Greece donated 20,000 vaccine doses to Albania.

=== Greek minority of Albania ===
The status of the Greek minority in Albania remains an unresolved issue between the two countries. The former communist regime granted limited rights to the Greek minority within a designated minority zone consisting of 99 villages. Since the fall of communism, issues related to the treatment of the Greek minority have frequently caused tension in relations between Greece and Albania. Current issues primarily involve respect for property rights, access to Greek language education outside the "minority zone", accurate census figures, and occasional violent incidents targeting the Greek minority. The Greek government maintains that the resolution of these issues is a condition for Albania's accession to the European Union.

In 1992, Greece proposed that a UN delegation visit the minority areas and that Greece establish a consulate in the region; both proposals were rejected by Albania. In December 2022, Greek Prime Minister Kyriakos Mitsotakis visited the town of Himara, becoming the first Greek Prime Minister to do so, as well as the villages of Derviçan and Livadhe. He received a warm welcome from the local inhabitants and stressed that Albania must support their rights, while also expressing support for Albania's EU integration.

=== Military cemeteries of fallen Greek soldiers ===
In January 2018, an agreement was reached between the foreign ministers of Greece and Albania to systematically recover the bodies of fallen Greek soldiers from the Greco-Italian War. It is estimated that between 6,800 and 8,000 Greek soldiers were hastily buried on the battlefield, their remains not properly identified. Joint Greek-Albanian teams began work on January 22 in the Këlcyrë Gorge, the site of the Battle of Kleisoura Pass. A small group of Cham Albanian activists attempted to disrupt the work but were removed by Albanian police. The soldiers' remains will be interred in Greek military cemeteries in the Kelcyre Gorge and in Bularat, a Greek minority village near the Greek-Albanian border. In 2021, the remains of three Greek soldiers from World War II were looted near the village of Vodhinë.

=== Cham issue ===
The "Cham issue" refers to a dispute initiated by Albania in the 1990s concerning the repatriation of the Cham Albanians. These individuals were expelled from the Greek region of Epirus between 1944 and 1945, at the conclusion of World War II, due to their alleged collaboration with the Axis powers' occupying forces. While Albania advocates for the reopening of this issue, Greece regards the matter as resolved. Nevertheless, an agreement was reached to establish a bilateral commission to address the property issue, which is viewed as a technical problem. This commission was formed in 1999 but has yet to operate.

=== Kosovo issue ===
Albania was among the first countries to recognize Kosovo as an independent state. In contrast, Greece maintains a neutral stance on the issue. Greece initially stated in 2008 that it would decide whether to recognize Kosovo's independence after a thorough examination of the issue, and that the decision would be made in close cooperation with European and neighboring countries, taking into account Serbia's role in maintaining regional stability.

Relations between Kosovo and Greece developed significantly following the election of Albin Kurti as Prime Minister of Kosovo in 2020. The Greek Foreign Minister has visited Kosovo on several occasions, and Greece has expressed a strong interest in normalizing relations between Kosovo and Serbia.

== Diplomatic missions ==
Albania has established an embassy in Athens, along with consulates in Ioannina and Thessaloniki. Similarly, Greece has an embassy in Tirana and operates consulates in Gjirokastër and Korçë.

== Bilateral relations and cooperation ==
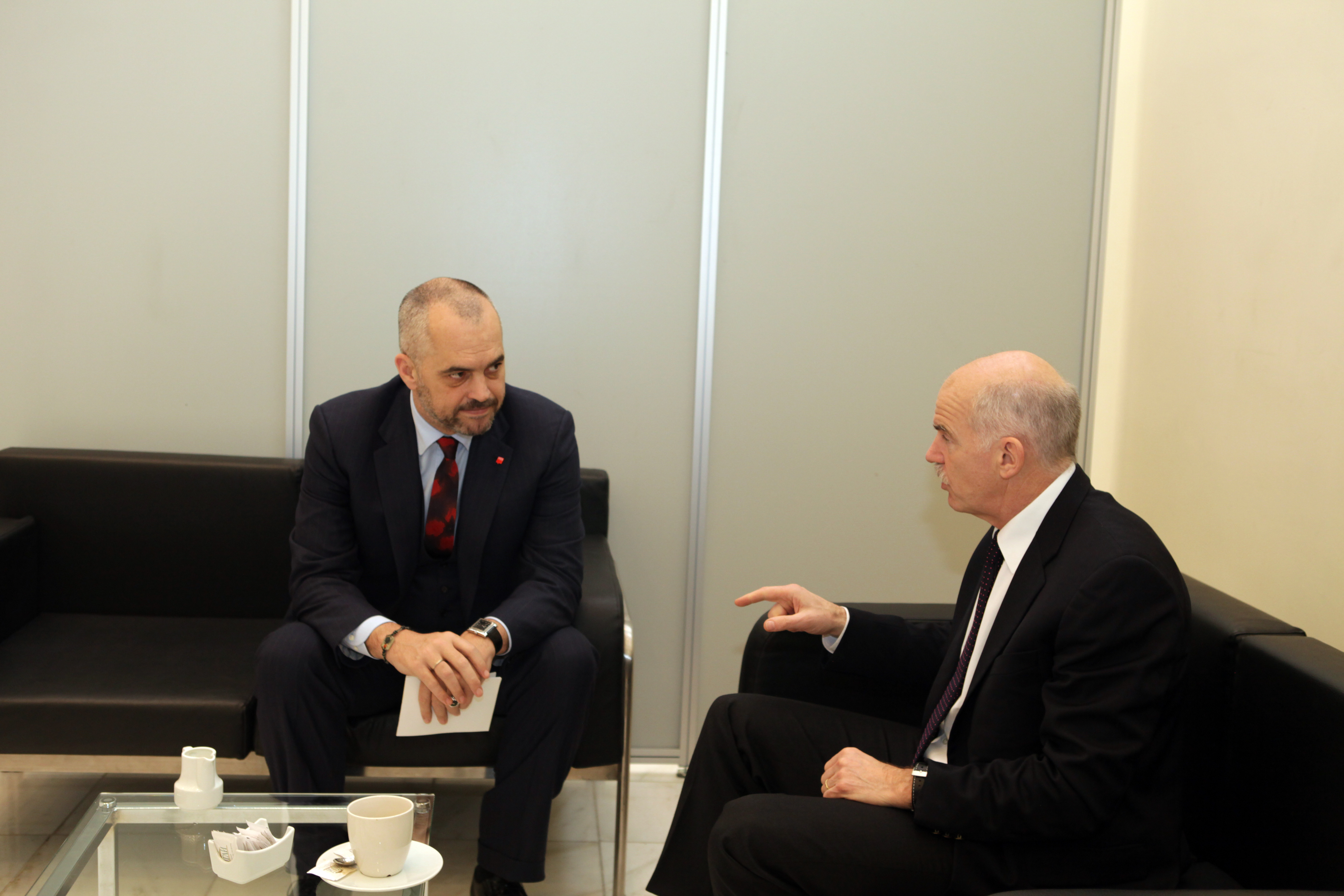
The two socialist leaders of Albania and Greece in 2011, Edi Rama and George Papandreou

Relations between Greece and Albania have improved since 1991, culminating in the signing of a Friendship, Cooperation, Good Neighborliness, and Security Agreement on March 21, 1996.

Greece has supported the Euro-Atlantic integration of the Republic of Albania. Since Albania's entry into NATO in May 2009, Albanian-Greek relations have developed on all fronts. The election victory of Edi Rama in 2013 marked a period of improvement of relations between the two nations. Ralf Gjoni, the Albanian Chief of Foreign Policy, described the diplomatic relations between the two countries as "excellent". However, relations deteriorated and became increasingly strained in 2014, a year after Rama's election, due to his refusal to accept the agreement defining the maritime borders and setting the Exclusive Economic Zone between the two countries. This agreement had been signed by Albania's previous government with Greece in 2009. Despite these difficulties, Greece is regarded as Albania's most important European Union ally and partner.

The two states cooperate in many fields, including politics, judiciary, energy, and tourism. Regular high-level visits and frequent contacts between the governments, parliaments, and local authorities of the two countries occur on various matters concerning individual sectors and mutual interests. Major ongoing projects between the two countries include the Trans Adriatic Pipeline and the touristic development of their shared Ionian coastline. Official meetings between the two governments and parliaments are frequent, and the armies of both states regularly conduct co-training as part of the NATO training program for the modernization of the Albanian Armed Forces.

Under the Greek EU Presidency, Albania was granted official EU candidate status. This coincided with the 10th anniversary of the "Agenda 2014", a proposal by the Greek Government to boost the integration of Albania and all the Western Balkan states into the European Union.

In March 2023, Greek Prime Minister Kyriakos Mitsotakis personally attended an artistic exhibition held by Albanian PM Edi Rama in Athens. Delegations from the two governments also held a working meeting aimed at enhancing relations between the two countries.

== Notable visits ==
Guest	Host	Place of visit	Date of visit
(Greece) Foreign Minister Nikos Kotzias	(Albania) Foreign Minister Ditmir Bushati	Tirana, Albania	July 2015
(Albania) Foreign Minister Ditmir Bushati	(Greece) Foreign Minister Nikos Kotzias	Athens, Greece	May 2016

=== State visit by Nikos Kotzias ===
On 14–16 July 2015, Nikos Kotzias, the Greek Foreign Minister, visited Albania as part of his tour of the Western Balkans. During this visit, both countries reaffirmed their close ties, asserting that there were no unresolved issues or taboo subjects between them. They agreed that maritime disputes would be resolved in due time, with both ministers emphasizing the close, strategic, and friendly relations between their peoples. Kotzias acknowledged the Greek National Minority and the Albanians residing in Greece, viewing their shared history and future as a bridge towards sustainable, robust, and productive relations.

== Bilateral agreement on maritime borders ==
The long-standing dispute between Albania and Greece over the division of maritime borders posed a significant obstacle to Albania's aspirations for European integration. Negotiations between the two countries began in earnest in 2007, culminating in a 2009 agreement titled "On the Delimitation of Their Respective Areas, the Continental Shelf, and Other Maritime Areas Belonging to International Law". Following this agreement, Greece expressed firm support for Albania's integration into the European Union, alongside other Balkan countries. However, in 2010, the Constitutional Court of Albania declared the 2009 agreement incompatible with the Constitution of the Republic of Albania.

== See also ==
- Foreign relations of Albania
- Foreign relations of Greece
- Greeks in Albania
- Albanians in Greece
- Accession of Albania to the European Union
