= List of foreign ministers in 2013 =

This is a list of foreign ministers in 2013.

== Africa ==
- Algeria
  1. Mourad Medelci (2007–2013)
  2. Ramtane Lamamra (2013–2017)
- Angola - Georges Rebelo Chicoti (2010–2017)
- Benin - Nassirou Bako Arifari (2011–2015)
- Botswana - Phandu Skelemani (2008–2014)
- Burkina Faso - Djibril Bassolé (2011–2014)
- Burundi - Laurent Kavakure (2011–2015)
- Cameroon - Pierre Moukoko Mbonjo (2011–2015)
- Cape Verde - Jorge Borges (2011–2014)
- Central African Republic
  1. Antoine Gambi (2009–2013)
  2. Parfait Anicet Mbay (2013)
  3. Charles Armel Doubane (2013)
  4. Léonie Banga-Bothy (2013–2014)
- Chad - Moussa Faki (2008–2017)
- Comoros
  1. Mohamed Bakri Ben Abdoulfatah Charif (2011–2013)
  2. El-Anrif Said Hassane (2013–2015)
- Republic of Congo - Basile Ikouébé (2007–2015)
- Democratic Republic of Congo - Raymond Tshibanda (2012–2016)
- Côte d'Ivoire - Charles Koffi Diby (2012–2016)
- Djibouti - Mahamoud Ali Youssouf (2005–present)
- Egypt
  1. Mohamed Kamel Amr (2011–2013)
  2. Nabil Fahmi (2013–2014)
- Equatorial Guinea - Agapito Mba Mokuy (2012–2018)
- Eritrea - Osman Saleh Mohammed (2007–present)
- Ethiopia - Tedros Adhanom (2012–2016)
- Gabon - Emmanuel Issoze-Ngondet (2012–2016)
- The Gambia -
  1. Susan Waffa-Ogoo (2012–2013)
  2. Aboubacar Senghore (2013–2014)
- Ghana -
  1. Muhammad Mumuni (2009–2013)
  2. Hanna Tetteh (2013–2017)
- Guinea - François Lonseny Fall (2012–2016)
- Guinea-Bissau -
  1. Faustino Imbali (2012–2013)
  2. Fernando Delfim da Silva (2013–2014)
- Kenya -
  1. Sam Ongeri (2012–2013)
  2. Amina Mohamed (2013–2018)
- Lesotho - Mohlabi Tsekoa (2007–2015)
- Liberia - Augustine Kpehe Ngafuan (2012–2015)
- Libya - Mohammed Abdelaziz (2012–2014)
- Madagascar -
  1. Pierrot Rajaonarivelo (2011–2013)
  2. Ulrich Andriantiana (acting) (2013–2014)
- Malawi - Ephraim Chiume (2012–2014)
- Mali
  1. Tieman Coulibaly (2012–2013)
  2. Zahabi Ould Sidi Mohamed (2013–2014)
  - Azawad -
    1. Hama Ag Mahmoud (2012-2013)
    2. Ibrahim Ag Mohamed Assaleh (2013)
- Mauritania
  1. Hamadi Ould Baba Ould Hamadi (2011–2013)
  2. Ahmed Ould Teguedi (2013–2015)
- Mauritius - Arvin Boolell (2008–2014)
- Morocco
  1. Saadeddine Othmani (2012–2013)
  2. Salaheddine Mezouar (2013–2017)
  - Western Sahara - Mohamed Salem Ould Salek (1998–2023)
- Mozambique - Oldemiro Balói (2008–2017)
- Namibia - Netumbo Nandi-Ndaitwah (2012–present)
- Niger - Mohamed Bazoum (2011–2015)
- Nigeria
  1. Olugbenga Ashiru (2011–2013)
  2. Viola Onwuliri (acting) (2013–2014)
- Rwanda - Louise Mushikiwabo (2009–2018)
- São Tomé and Príncipe - Natália Pedro da Costa Umbelina Neto (2012–2014)
- Senegal - Mankeur Ndiaye (2012–2017)
- Seychelles - Jean-Paul Adam (2010–2015)
- Sierra Leone - Samura Kamara (2012–2017)
- Somalia - Fowsiyo Yussuf Haji Aadan (2012–2014)
  - Somaliland
    1. Mohammad Abdullahi Omar (2010–2013)
    2. Mohamed Yonis (2013–2015)
  - Puntland - Daud Mohamed Omar (2010–2014)
- South Africa - Maite Nkoana-Mashabane (2009–2018)
- South Sudan
  1. Nhial Deng Nhial (2011–2013)
  2. Charles Manyang d'Awol (acting) (2013)
  3. Barnaba Marial Benjamin (2013–2016)
- Sudan - Ali Karti (2010–2015)
- Swaziland
  1. Mtiti Fakudze (2011–2013)
  2. Sotsha Dlamini (acting) (2013)
  3. Mgwagwa Gamedze (2013–2018)
- Tanzania – Bernard Membe (2007–2015)
- Togo -
  1. Elliott Ohin (2010–2013)
  2. Robert Dussey (2013–present)
- Tunisia -
  1. Rafik Abdessalem (2011–2013)
  2. Othman Jerandi (2013–2014)
- Uganda - Sam Kutesa (2005–present)
- Zambia -
  1. Given Lubinda (2012–2013)
  2. Effron Lungu (2013)
  3. Wilbur Simuusa (2013–2014)
- Zimbabwe - Simbarashe Mumbengegwi (2005–2017)

== Asia ==
- Afghanistan -
  1. Zalmai Rassoul (2010–2013)
  2. Ahmad Moqbel Zarar (2013–2014)
- Armenia - Eduard Nalbandyan (2008–2018)
- Azerbaijan - Elmar Mammadyarov (2004–2020)
  - Nagorno-Karabakh - Karen Mirzoyan (2012–2017)
- Bahrain - Sheikh Khalid ibn Ahmad Al Khalifah (2005–2020)
- Bangladesh
  1. Dipu Moni (2009–2013)
  2. Abul Hassan Mahmud Ali (2013–2014)
- Bhutan
  1. Ugyen Tshering (2008–2013)
  2. Rinzin Dorji (2013–2015)
- Brunei - Pengiran Muda Mohamed Bolkiah (1984–2015)
- Cambodia - Hor Namhong (1998–2016)
- China
  1. Yang Jiechi (2007–2013)
  2. Wang Yi (2013–present)
- East Timor - José Luís Guterres (2012–2015)
- Georgia - Maia Panjikidze (2012–2014)
  - Abkhazia - Viacheslav Chirikba (2011–2016)
  - South Ossetia - David Sanakoyev (2012–2015)
- India - Salman Khurshid (2012–2014)
- Indonesia - Marty Natalegawa (2009–2014)
- Iran
  1. Ali Akbar Salehi (2010–2013)
  2. Mohammad Javad Zarif (2013–2021)
- Iraq - Hoshyar Zebari (2003–2014)
  - Kurdistan - Falah Mustafa Bakir (2006–2019)
- Israel
  1. Benjamin Netanyahu (2012–2013)
  2. Avigdor Lieberman (2013–2015)
  - Palestinian Authority - Riyad al-Maliki (2007–present)
    - Gaza Strip (in rebellion against the Palestinian National Authority) - Ismail Haniyeh (acting) (2012–present)
- Japan - Fumio Kishida (2012–2017)
- Jordan - Nasser Judeh (2009–2017)
- Kazakhstan – Erlan Idrissov (2012–2016)
- North Korea - Pak Ui-chun (2007–2014)
- South Korea
  1. Kim Sung-hwan (2010–2013)
  2. Yun Byung-se (2013–2017)
- Kuwait - Sheikh Sabah Al-Khalid Al-Sabah (2011–2019)
- Kyrgyzstan - Erlan Abdyldayev (2012–2018)
- Laos - Thongloun Sisoulith (2006–2016)
- Lebanon - Adnan Mansour (2011–2014)
- Malaysia - Anifah Aman (2009–2018)
- Maldives -
  1. Abdul Samad Abdulla (2012–2013)
  2. Asim Ahmed (acting) (2013)
  3. Mariyam Shakeela (acting) (2013)
  4. Dunya Maumoon (2013–2016)
- Mongolia - Luvsanvandan Bold (2012–2014)
- Myanmar - Wunna Maung Lwin (2011–2016)
- Nepal
  1. Narayan Kaji Shrestha (2011–2013)
  2. Madhav Prasad Ghimire (2013–2014)
- Oman - Yusuf bin Alawi bin Abdullah (1982–2020)
- Pakistan
  1. Hina Rabbani Khar (2011–2013)
  2. Sartaj Aziz (2013–2017)
- Philippines - Albert del Rosario (2011–2016)
- Qatar
  1. Sheikh Hamad bin Jassim bin Jaber Al Thani (1992–2013)
  2. Khalid bin Mohammad Al Attiyah (2013–2016)
- Saudi Arabia - Prince Saud bin Faisal bin Abdulaziz Al Saud (1975–2015)
- Singapore - K. Shanmugam (2011–2015)
- Sri Lanka - G. L. Peiris (2010–2015)
- Syria - Walid Muallem (2006–2020)
- Taiwan - David Lin (2012–2016)
- Tajikistan -
  1. Khamrokhon Zaripov (2006–2013)
  2. Sirodjidin Aslov (2013–present)
- Thailand - Surapong Tovichakchaikul (2011–2014)
- Turkey - Ahmet Davutoğlu (2009–2014)
- Turkmenistan - Raşit Meredow (2001–present)
- United Arab Emirates - Sheikh Abdullah bin Zayed Al Nahyan (2006–present)
- Uzbekistan - Abdulaziz Komilov (2012–present)
- Vietnam - Phạm Bình Minh (2011–2021)
- Yemen - Abu Bakr al-Qirbi (2001–2014)

== Europe ==
- Albania
  1. Edmond Panariti (2012–2013)
  2. Aldo Bumçi (2013)
  3. Ditmir Bushati (2013–2019)
- Andorra - Gilbert Saboya Sunyé (2011–2017)
- Austria -
  1. Michael Spindelegger (2008–2013)
  2. Sebastian Kurz (2013–2017)
- Belarus - Vladimir Makei (2012–present)
- Belgium - Didier Reynders (2011–2019)
  - Brussels-Capital Region
    1. Jean-Luc Vanraes (2009–2013)
    2. Guy Vanhengel (2013–2019)
  - Flanders - Kris Peeters (2008–2014)
  - Wallonia - Rudy Demotte (2009–2014)
- Bosnia and Herzegovina - Zlatko Lagumdžija (2012–2015)
- Bulgaria -
  1. Nickolay Mladenov (2010–2013)
  2. Marin Raykov (acting) (2013)
  3. Kristian Vigenin (2013–2014)
- Croatia - Vesna Pusić (2011–2016)
- Cyprus
  1. Erato Kozakou-Marcoullis (2011–2013)
  2. Ioannis Kasoulidis (2013–2018)
  - Northern Cyprus
    1. Hüseyin Özgürgün (2009–2013)
    2. Kutlay Erk (2013)
    3. Özdil Nami (2013–2015)
- Czech Republic
  1. Karel Schwarzenberg (2010–2013)
  2. Jan Kohout (2013–2014)
- Denmark -
  1. Villy Søvndal (2011–2013)
  2. Holger K. Nielsen (2013–2014)
  - Greenland
    1. Kuupik Kleist (2009–2013)
    2. Aleqa Hammond (2013–2014)
  - Faroe Islands - Kaj Leo Johannesen (2011–2015)
- Estonia - Urmas Paet (2005–2014)
- Finland - Erkki Tuomioja (2011–2015)
- France - Laurent Fabius (2012–2016)
- Germany -
  1. Guido Westerwelle (2009–2013)
  2. Frank-Walter Steinmeier (2013–2017)
- Greece
  1. Dimitris Avramopoulos (2012–2013)
  2. Evangelos Venizelos (2013–2015)
- Hungary - János Martonyi (2010–2014)
- Iceland
  1. Össur Skarphéðinsson (2009–2013)
  2. Gunnar Bragi Sveinsson (2013–2016)
- Ireland - Eamon Gilmore (2011–2014)
- Italy -
  1. Giulio Terzi di Sant'Agata (2011–2013)
  2. Mario Monti (acting) (2013)
  3. Emma Bonino (2013–2014)
- Latvia - Edgars Rinkēvičs (2011–2023)
- Liechtenstein - Aurelia Frick (2009–2019)
- Lithuania - Linas Antanas Linkevičius (2012–2020)
- Luxembourg - Jean Asselborn (2004–present)
- Republic of Macedonia - Nikola Poposki (2011–2017)
- Malta
  1. Francis Zammit Dimech (2012–2013)
  2. George Vella (2013–2017)
- Moldova
  1. Iurie Leancă (2009–2013)
  2. Natalia Gherman (2013–2016)
  - Transnistria - Nina Shtanski (2012–2015)
  - Gagauzia - Svetlana Gradinari (2013–2015)
- Monaco - José Badia (2011–2015)
- Montenegro - Igor Lukšić (2012–2016)
- Netherlands - Frans Timmermans (2012–2014)
- Norway -
  1. Espen Barth Eide (2012–2013)
  2. Børge Brende (2013–2017)
- Poland - Radosław Sikorski (2007–2014)
- Portugal -
  1. Paulo Portas (2011–2013)
  2. Rui Machete (2013–2015)
- Romania - Titus Corlăţean (2012–2014)
- Russia - Sergey Lavrov (2004–present)
- San Marino - Pasquale Valentini (2012–2016)
- Serbia - Ivan Mrkić (2012–2014)
  - Kosovo - Enver Hoxhaj (2011–2014)
- Slovakia - Miroslav Lajčák (2012–2020)
- Slovenia - Karl Erjavec (2012–2018)
- Spain - José Manuel García-Margallo (2011–2016)
  - Catalonia - Francesc Homs Molist (2012–2015)
- Sweden - Carl Bildt (2006–2014)
- Switzerland - Didier Burkhalter (2012–2017)
- Ukraine - Leonid Kozhara (2012–2014)
- United Kingdom - William Hague (2010–2014)
  - Scotland - Fiona Hyslop (2009–2020)
  - Jersey - Sir Philip Bailhache (2013–2018)
- Vatican City - Archbishop Dominique Mamberti (2006–2014)

== North America and the Caribbean ==
- Antigua and Barbuda - Baldwin Spencer (2005–2014)
- The Bahamas - Fred Mitchell (2012–2017)
- Barbados - Maxine McClean (2008–2018)
- Belize - Wilfred Elrington (2008–2020)
- Canada - John Baird (2011–2015)
  - Quebec - Jean-François Lisée (2012–2014)
- Costa Rica - Enrique Castillo (2011–2014)
- Cuba - Bruno Rodríguez Parrilla (2009–present)
- Dominica - Roosevelt Skerrit (2010–2014)
- Dominican Republic - Carlos Morales Troncoso (2004–2014)
- El Salvador -
  1. Hugo Martínez (2009–2013)
  2. Jaime Miranda (2013–2014)
- Grenada -
  1. Tillman Thomas (2012–2013)
  2. Nickolas Steele (2013–2014)
- Guatemala
  1. Harold Caballeros (2012–2013)
  2. Fernando Carrera (2013–2014)
- Haiti - Pierre Richard Casimir (2012–2014)
- Honduras
  1. Arturo Corrales (2011–2013)
  2. Mireya Agüero (2013–2015)
- Jamaica - Arnold Nicholson (2012–2016)
- Mexico - José Antonio Meade Kuribreña (2012–2015)
- Nicaragua - Samuel Santos López (2007–2017)
- Panama
  1. Rómulo Roux (2012–2013)
  2. Fernando Núñez Fábrega (2013–2014)
- Puerto Rico –
  1. Kenneth McClintock (2009–2013)
  2. David Bernier (2013–2015)
- Saint Kitts and Nevis -
  1. Sam Condor (2010–2013)
  2. Patrice Nisbett (2013–2015)
- Saint Lucia - Alva Baptiste (2011–2016)
- Saint Vincent and the Grenadines
  1. Douglas Slater (2010–2013)
  2. Camillo Gonsalves (2013–2015)
- Trinidad and Tobago - Winston Dookeran (2012–2015)
- United States of America
  1. Hillary Clinton (2009–2013)
  2. John Kerry (2013–2017)

== Oceania ==
- Australia
  1. Bob Carr (2012–2013)
  2. Julie Bishop (2013–2018)
- Fiji - Ratu Inoke Kubuabola (2009–2016)
- French Polynesia -
  1. Oscar Temaru (2011–2013)
  2. Gaston Flosse (2013–2014)
- Kiribati - Anote Tong (2003–2016)
- Marshall Islands - Phillip H. Muller (2012–2014)
- Micronesia - Lorin S. Robert (2007–2019)
- Nauru
  1. Kieren Keke (2012–2013)
  2. Sprent Dabwido (2013)
  3. Roland Kun (2013)
  4. Sprent Dabwido (2013)
  5. Baron Waqa (2013–2019)
- New Zealand - Murray McCully (2008–2017)
  - Cook Islands
    1. Tom Marsters (2010–2013)
    2. Henry Puna (2013–2020)
  - Niue - Toke Talagi (2008–2020)
  - Tokelau
    1. Kerisiano Kalolo (2012–2013)
    2. Salesio Lui (2013–2014)
- Palau
  1. Victor Yano (2010–2013)
  2. Billy Kuartei (2013–2017)
- Papua New Guinea - Rimbink Pato (2012–2019)
- Samoa - Tuilaepa Aiono Sailele Malielegaoi (1998–2021)
- Solomon Islands - Clay Forau Soalaoi (2012–2014)
- Tonga - Sialeʻataongo Tuʻivakanō (2010–2014)
- Tuvalu
  1. Apisai Ielemia (2010–2013)
  2. Taukelina Finikaso (2013–2019)
- Vanuatu
  1. Alfred Carlot (2011–2013)
  2. Edward Natapei (2013–2014)

== South America ==
- Argentina - Héctor Timerman (2010–2015)
- Bolivia - David Choquehuanca (2006–2017)
- Brazil -
  1. Antonio Patriota (2011–2013)
  2. Luiz Alberto Figueiredo (2013–2015)
- Chile - Alfredo Moreno Charme (2010–2014)
- Colombia - María Ángela Holguín (2010–2018)
- Ecuador - Ricardo Patiño (2010–2016)
- Guyana - Carolyn Rodrigues (2008–2015)
- Paraguay
  1. José Félix Fernández Estigarribia (2012–2013)
  2. Eladio Loizaga (2013–2018)
- Peru -
  1. Rafael Roncagliolo (2011–2013)
  2. Eda Rivas (2013–2014)
- Suriname - Winston Lackin (2010–2015)
- Uruguay - Luis Almagro (2010–2015)
- Venezuela
  1. Nicolás Maduro (2006–2013)
  2. Elías Jaua (2013–2014)
