= Death of Konstantinos Katsifas =

2018 police killing of an ethnic Greek in Albania

The death of Konstantinos Katsifas occurred on October 28, 2018, in the village of Bularat, Albania, near the Greek-Albanian border.

Katsifas, a 35-year-old ethnic Greek from Albania, was fatally shot by Albanian police under controversial circumstances. His death sparked significant tensions between Greece and Albania, as well as within the Greek minority in Albania.

== Konstantinos Katsifas ==
Katsifas was born in Bularat, the son of Greek parents. In 1990, when he was seven, his family moved to Athens, where he grew up along with his three sisters. He had served in the Greek army. He was working as a blacksmith, and was also seasonally employed. He was married and had a daughter.

After his death, Greek police sources stated that he had been arrested in the past for cocaine and hashish trade and trafficking on the testimony of an Albanian drug dealer, but was acquitted of the charges.

He was active on social media, posting for the annexation of Northern Epirus to Greece, as well as photographs related to the paramilitary, terrorist, and ultranationalist organisation MAVI ("Northern Epirus Liberation Front"). A few days before his death, he had announced in advance his intention to send a message against the rapprochement between Greece and Albania, with a post on his Facebook account stating that the "hardcore youth of Northern Epirus will not stay inactive", and calling all of the area's Greeks to "send a message on October 28th to all directions. GREECE OR DEATH."

== Incident ==
On October 28, 2018, Albania was commemorating Ohi Day, a national holiday in Greece that also holds significance for the Greek minority in Albania. On that day, according to his family, Katsifas fired a Kalashnikov rifle into the air near the village of Bularat during a procession; Albanian police, however, stated that he had fired at police cars, which bore visible bullet holes. Albanian police responded to the incident. Katsifas allegedly opened fire on the Albanian police with an AK-47, prompting the RENEA forces to later intervene. Katsifas fled to the nearby mountains, where he was eventually located by RENEA.

According to Albanian authorities, Katsifas was killed in an exchange of gunfire after he allegedly refused to surrender and opened fire on the police. There are conflicting reports and allegations that Katsifas may have been executed rather than killed in a firefight. The precise circumstances of his death remain disputed.

== Reactions ==
Katsifas's funeral in Bularat was attended by thousands, including many who traveled from Greece.

The Greek government called for a thorough investigation into the circumstances of Katsifas's death.

The Greek ex-minister of foreign affairs Theodoros Pangalos condemned Katsifas, saying that he stands against everyone who attack the police forces and everyone who is armed against the police must be shot.

== See also ==
- Ohi Day
- North Epirus
- Albania–Greece relations
- RENEA
- Death of Aristotelis Goumas
