= Goumas =

Goumas (Greek: Γκούμας) is a Greek surname. Notable people with the surname include:

- Aristotelis Goumas (died 2010), Greek car ramming victim in Albania
- Giannis Goumas (born 1975), Greek football manager and former player
- Nikos Goumas (1908–2001), Greek businessman
- Vassilis Goumas (1946–2026), Greek basketball player

== See also ==
- Nikos Goumas Stadium
