= Pavli Terka =

Albanian politician (died 1943)

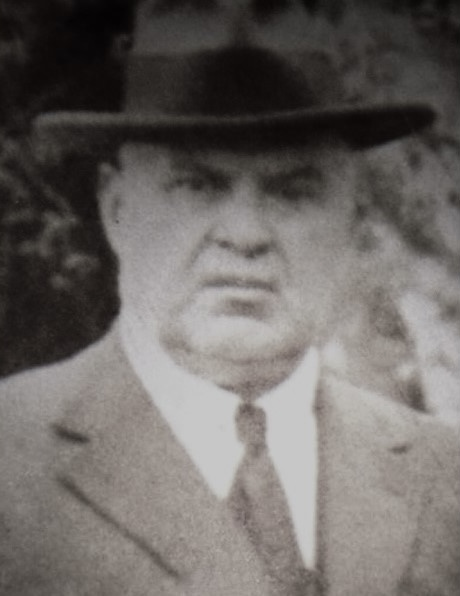

4th Foreign Minister of Albania
- In office 5 October 1914 – 27 January 1916
- Prime Minister: Essad Toptani
- Preceded by: Prenk Bib Doda
- Succeeded by: Mehmed Konica

Personal details
- Born: c. 1865 Durrës, Ottoman Albania
- Died: 8 June 1941 Corfu, Greece

Pavli Terka (born 1865 year in Durrës and died 8 June 1941 in Corfu) was an Albanian state official and politician who served as Minister of Foreign Affairs in the Toptani Government.

== Biography ==
Pavli Terka was born in the western port city of Durrës to a family with ties to the city's merchant elite. Terka Family originates from Voskopoja(Moskopoly) Albania. A part of Terka Family left Voskopoja since 1730, and placed to Wien, Austrian Habsburg Empire. Andrea Tirka(Terka); Teodor Demeter Tirka, Demeter Teodor Tirka... Another part of Tirka=Terka Family established to Durres. Prior to entering politics, in the year 1895 he worked as banker, in the Durres sanxhak, privat business. Later as a consular officer near the Italian Consulate, Durres. On September 15, 1909, along with Haxhi Sulejmani and Jahja Ballhysa, he founded the patriotic club "Bashkimi" and took the role of deputy chairman. The club was established just days following the Congress of Dibër and worked to introduce written Albanian to the local idadiye school (gymnasium).

A few years later, Terka joined the orthodox eldership of Durrës and emerged as its leader. It was during this time when he acquainted himself with Essad Pasha Toptani who appointed him as minister of foreign affairs in his newly formed cabinet. Terka accompanied Essad Pasha at the Paris Peace Conference in April 1919.

After leaving politics, Terka migrated with his family to the island of Corfu, Greece and became involved in the local trade. He died in 1941.
