= Ilir Boçka =

Albanian diplomat

Ambassador of Albania to Serbia
- Incumbent
- Assumed office 2014
- President: Bujar Nishani; Ilir Meta
- Prime Minister: Edi Rama
- Foreign Minister: Ditmir Bushati

Albanian Minister for Foreign Affairs
- In office 18 December 1991 – 11 April 1992
- President: Ramiz Alia; Sali Berisha
- Prime Minister: Vilson Ahmeti
- Preceded by: Muhamet Kapllani
- Succeeded by: Alfred Serreqi

Personal details
- Born: January 10, 1950 (age 76) Gjirokastër, People's Republic of Albania

Ilir Boçka (born January 10, 1950) was an Albanian career diplomat, serving as Albania's Ambassador to Serbia for a long time, and is now retired. He briefly served as Minister of Foreign Affairs from 1991 to 1992.

== Life and career ==
Ilir Boçka was born on January 10, 1950 in Gjirokastër, People's Republic of Albania. Boçka graduated with a Law Degree in 1975 from the University of Tirana. From 1972 to 1980, he worked as journalist with the Albanian News Agency (ATA). He joined the Ministry of Foreign Affairs in June 1981, when he was appointed as the Head of the Press and Information Directory at the Ministry of Foreign Affairs. From 1986 to 1990, he was Ambassador to East Germany. After the democratic changes during the period from June 1991 to December 1991, he was appointed as Deputy Minister in the Ministry of Foreign Affairs. In the first free elections held in Albania he was appointed as Minister of Foreign Affairs in the Provisional Government (December 1991–April 1992).

From 1992 to 1997 he worked as a lawyer and adviser of National and International Law in the private sector. From October 1997 to May 1998, Boçka was the Director of Information and Media Department at the Prime Minister's Office, and from May 1998 to August 2000 he was Deputy Minister of Defense, responsible most particularly for Albania's Euro-Atlantic Integration and the country's preparations for NATO membership.

He served as Ambassador of the Albanian Mission to NATO and as the Representative of Albania to the Euro-Atlantic Partnership Council from November 2000 to July 2007. In July 2007, Ilir Boçka was among the top four nominations for the post of President of Albania. He was Charge d'affaires in New Delhi, India, from January 2008 to September 2010, overseeing the establishment of the first Albanian embassy in India.

Since 2014, Boçka has served as the Albanian Ambassador to Serbia.
