= Alfred Serreqi =

Albanian politician

Foreign Minister of Albania
- In office 11 April 1992 – 11 July 1996
- Preceded by: Ilir Boçka
- Succeeded by: Tritan Shehu

Personal details
- Born: 24 September 1938 (age 87) Shkodër, Albania

Alfred Serreqi (born September 24, 1938) was the minister for foreign affairs for Albania in the 1992 government of Sali Berisha. He is a member of the Democratic Party.
