= Aldo Bumçi =

Albanian politician

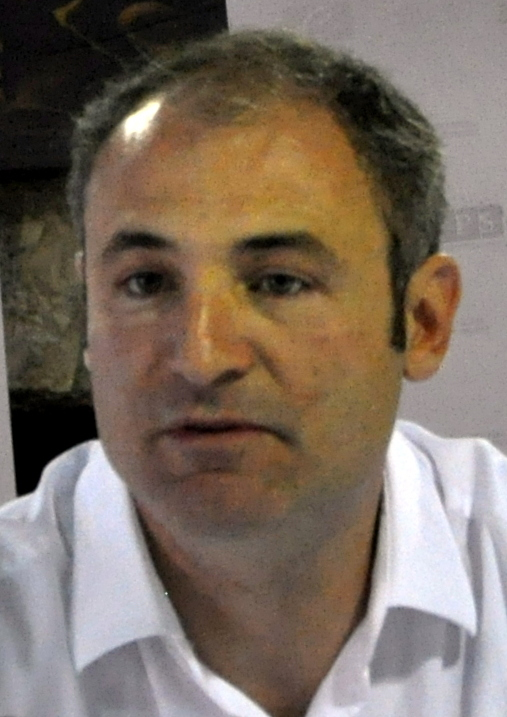

Minister of Foreign Affairs
- In office 4 April 2013 – 15 September 2013
- Prime Minister: Sali Berisha
- Preceded by: Edmond Panariti
- Succeeded by: Ditmir Bushati

Minister of Tourism, Cultural Affairs, Youth and Sports
- In office 2011 – 4 April 2013
- Preceded by: Ferdinand Xhaferraj
- Succeeded by: Visar Zhiti

Member of the Albanian parliament
- In office 2005–2019

Minister of Justice
- In office 2005–2007
- Preceded by: Fatmir Xhafaj
- Succeeded by: Enkelejd Alibeaj

Personal details
- Born: Aldo Tonin Bumçi; 11 June 1974 (age 52) Tirana, Albania
- Party: Democratic Party
- Spouse: Ilda Zhulali
- Children: David Bumci
- Education: Bilkent University
- Committees: Committee on Legal Affairs, Public Administration and Human Rights; Committee on European Integration

Aldo Tonin Bumçi (born 11 June 1974) is a member of the Assembly of the Republic of Albania for the Democratic Party of Albania. He was Minister of Justice from 2005 to 2007, Minister of Foreign Affairs on 2013. He is also member of Committee on Legal Affairs, Public Administration and Human Rights and Committee on European Integration.

== Early life ==
Bumçi was born 1974 in the Albanian capital of Tirana.

== Career ==
He is a member of the Albanian Parliament, serving a constituency based around the northern Albanian town of Lezhë. He was elected as a representative of the Democratic Party of Albania.

=== Minister of Justice ===
From 2005 to 2007, he served as the country's Minister of Justice in the government of Prime Minister Sali Berisha.

Bumçi's term as Minister of Justice was marked by the government's efforts to dismiss the Prosecutor General of Albania, Theodhori Sollaku. While generally recognized to have been an ineffective Prosecutor General and accused by the ruling coalition of links to organized crime, the proceedings against him in the Parliament were deeply flawed, eventually leading President Alfred Moisiu to issue a statement saying more time is needed to examine all the related documentation. This led to an outcry from the Democratic Party, which claimed to have investigated 83 cases of criminal action by Sollaku and reached guilty verdicts in all of them in an extraordinarily short period of time. After President Moisiu refused to decree the dismissal, Bumçi became the leading voice of the Democratic Party carrying on the fight to remove Sollaku.

=== Minister of Foreign Affairs ===
On 4 April 2013, Bumçi was appointed Minister of Foreign Affairs.

== See also ==
- List of foreign ministers in 2013
- List of ministers of foreign affairs of Albania

Political offices
Preceded by Fatmir Xhafaj	Minister of Justice; 2005–2007	Succeeded by Enkelejd Alibeaj
Preceded by Edmond Panariti	67th Foreign Minister of Albania; 4 April 2013–15 September 2013	Succeeded by Ditmir Bushati
