= Fuad Asllani =

Albanian diplomat and lawyer (1897-1981)

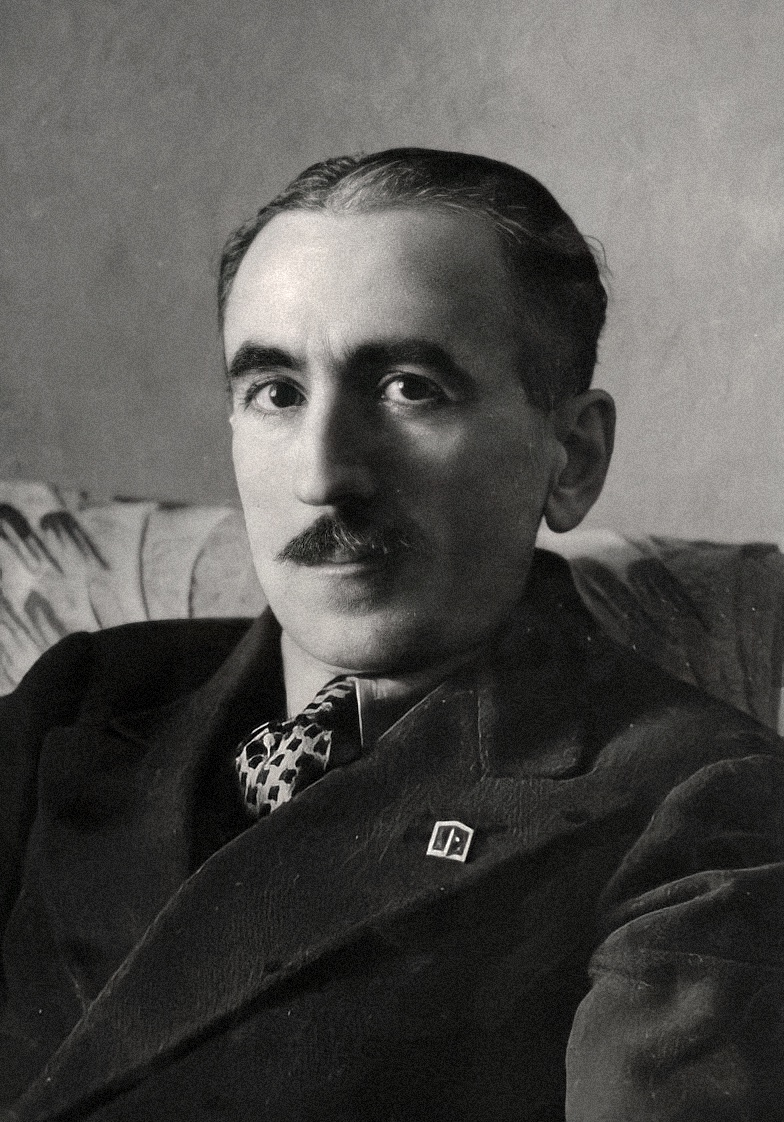

Foreign minister of Albania
- In office 21 October 1935 – 7 November 1936
- Prime Minister: Mehdi Frashëri
- Preceded by: Xhaferr Vila
- Succeeded by: Ekrem Libohova

Personal details
- Born: 27 September 1897 Beirut, Ottoman Empire
- Died: 27 May 1981 (aged 83) Elbasan, Albania
- Profession: Diplomat, politician

Fuat or Fuad Asllani (1897-1981) was Albanian lawyer, politician and diplomat. He was Minister of Foreign Affairs from 1935 to 1936.

== Biography ==
He was born in Beirut. His father was Bexhet Asllani the kadi Asllan Effendi from Nepravishtë , at that time he was the director of the Hama District in the Sham vilayet, present-day Syria. In the years 1908-1917 he attended primary and secondary education in Istanbul at Robert College. In 1917–1923, through a scholarship awarded by the Austro-Hungarian military command in Shkodra, he was awarded a scholarship through which he studied at the Faculty of Law of the University of Vienna. In the temporary Djalëria, which was published by the Albanian student youth in the Austrian capital, he published several articles on legal, political and cultural topics, wrote poetry and translated French, German and English authors. He signed himself with the pseudonyms "Fedo Lami", as well as "FA".

In 1923-24 he was employed as a secretary in the Ministry of Internal Affairs. On July 14, 1924, he was appointed secretary to the organizer of the Ministry of Internal Affairs, Sterling, and three days later he was appointed a member of the Dictation Court. With the defeat of the June Revolution , in December he left Albania for Italy, where he stayed for a short time in Brindisi and Bari. He went to Switzerland, where he edited the newspaper "Liria Kombëtare", then returned to Bari and in 1926 to his homeland. In the three-year period 1926 - 1929 he worked as a lawyer in Delvinë. In 1929 he was an assistant member of the Council of State. In 1929-32 and 1933 he was appointed administrative and consular director at the Ministry of Foreign Affairs. In 1932-33 he was appointed director of the Political Directorate of the same ministry. In 1933 he was sent as a chargé d'affaires to London. In the Frashëri government, he was given the portfolio of Minister of Foreign Affairs. In 1937, he was elected deputy of the Gjirokastra prefecture, and continued to be so even after the Italian occupation. In 1945–46, together with Adem Balliçi, he practiced the tobaccotrade in Tirana. In 1946, Omer Nishani proposed to him to take a directorship in the Ministry of Foreign Affairs, but he refused. In 1947, he left Tirana and settled in Elbasan, where he continued practicing law. On May 3, 1951, he was arrested and on October 4, 1951, the Korça Court sentenced him to 15 years in prison on the charge of having "served the Zog and fascism regimes, had participated in meetings against LANÇ and had intended to overthrow the popular government". This decision was changed by the Supreme Court to 5 years in prison and forced labor. He was released from prison on May 3, 1956. In the years 1959 - 1967 he continued to work as a lawyer in Elbasan until it was abolished as a profession. He died on May 27, 1981.
