= Gent Cakaj =

Albanian politician

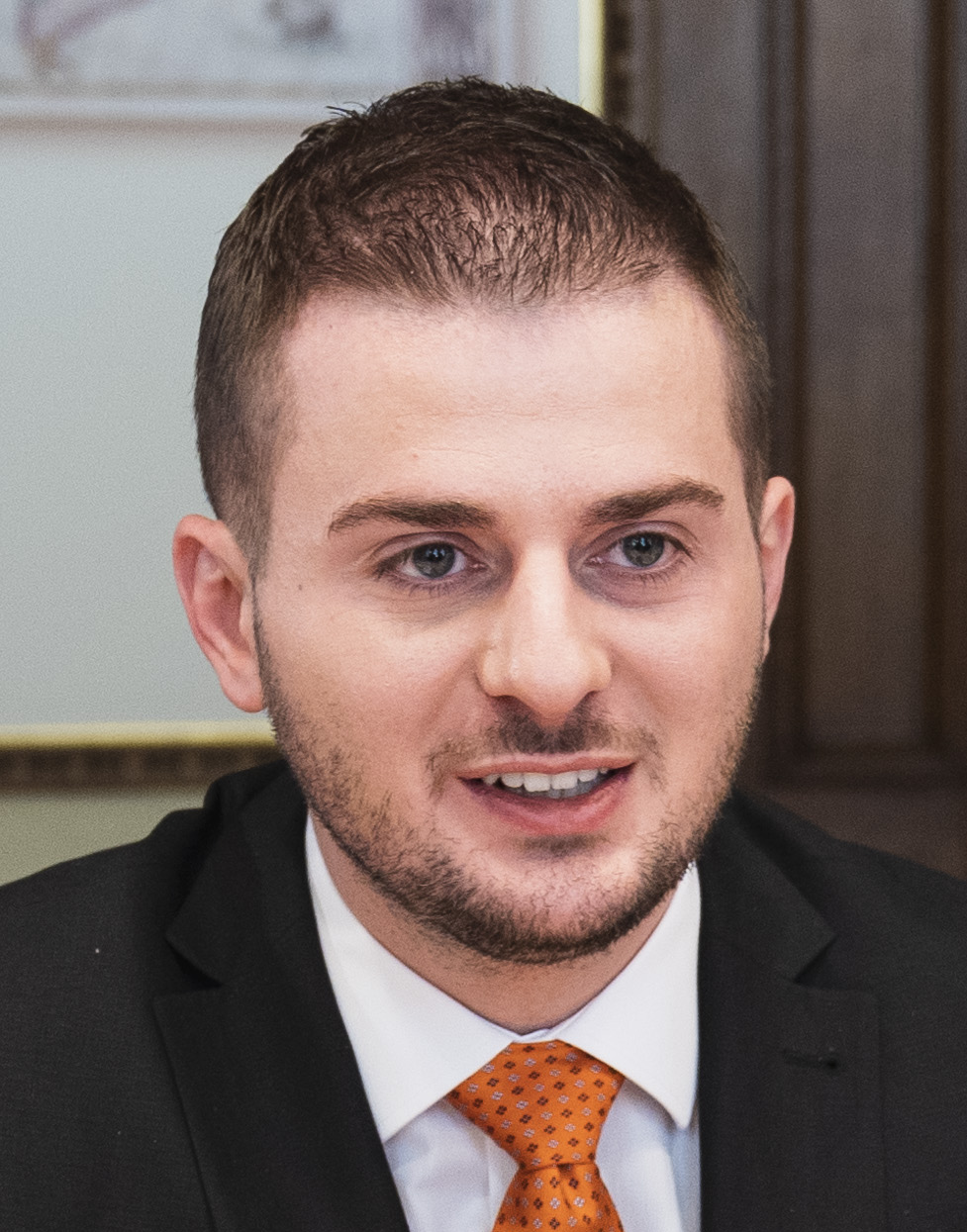

40th Minister of Foreign Affairs
- In office 23 January 2019 – 29 December 2020 Serving with Edi Rama
- Prime Minister: Edi Rama
- Preceded by: Ditmir Bushati
- Succeeded by: Olta Xhaçka

Personal details
- Born: 6 July 1990 (age 36) Pristina, SFR Yugoslavia
- Party: Socialist Party (2019–2020; Albania)
- Other political affiliations: Vetëvendosje (2005–2007; Kosovo)
- Education: Central European University; University of Pristina; AAB University; University of Leuven

Gent Cakaj (born 6 July 1990) is a Kosovo-born Albanian politician, who served as the Acting Minister of Foreign Affairs of Albania from 2019–2020.

== Biography ==
He is the son of Shkëlzen Cakaj, a scientist born in Gjakova, at the time SAP Kosovo, SFR Yugoslavia. Gent Cakaj was born and grew up in Pristina. He is the brother of Gresa Caka Nimani, who currently is the President of the Constitutional Court of Kosovo.

Cakaj was educated in Kosovo, Belgium and Hungary, and holds two bachelor and three master degrees in philosophy, political sciences, and law. He graduated with distinctions, in 2014 with a MA on Philosophy from KU Leuven, in 2015 with a MA on political sciences from the Central European University and in 2017 with a RMA on philosophy from KU Leuven.

During 2018, he initially served as a political advisor to the Prime Minister of Albania and subsequently as a Deputy Minister for Foreign Affairs. In addition, Cakaj served as both, the National Coordinator for the Regional Economic Area and the National Coordinator for the European Integration process. Prime Minister Edi Rama had an exceptional assessment for Cakaj also claiming that he is among the “most knowledgeable” persons he has met.

In January 2019, Cakaj was designated to replace incumbent Ditmir Bushati as Minister of Foreign Affairs by Prime Minister Edi Rama after a cabinet reshuffle. The matter led to a public spat between the President and Prime Minister that ended with President Meta rejecting his appointment and Prime Minister Rama temporarily taking on the additional role of Foreign Affairs Minister. However, Rama delegated the foreign affairs portfolio to Cakaj as Acting Minister on January 23 and Cakaj, subsequently exercised the role of Minister of Foreign Affairs.

During his mandate, Cakaj led Albania's diplomatic campaign for opening accession talks with the EU and was specifically engaged in ensuring Albania's successful bid to become a non-permanent member in the Security Council 2022-2023. Cakaj is also known for his engagement in the regional affairs, especially for his contribution to the Albanian minority in Serbia.

On 29 December 2020, Cakaj resigned from the position of Acting Foreign Minister, stating that "following the successful completion of the OSCE chairmanship, the opening of the EU accession negotiations, the extraordinary work to secure a seat in the Security Council for 2022–2023, the implementation of a series of unprecedented factor-raising measures for Albanians in the Western Balkans, and since Albania is on the verge of an election campaign, where I do not intend to run as a candidate for MP, I consider that the chapter of my service as the head of Albanian diplomacy is over".

After finishing his term, Cakaj was also mentioned as a potential candidate to lead Kosovo's largest opposition party, Democratic Party of Kosovo.

== Publications ==
- With Gezim Krasniqi: The role of minorities in the Serb-Albanian political quagmire, in Kosovo and Serbia: Contested Options and Shared Consequences, edited by Leandrit Mehmeti and Branislav Radeljic (Pittsburgh: Pittsburgh University Press, 2016), 149-167.

== See also ==
- List of current foreign ministers
- List of ministers of foreign affairs of Albania
