= Muhamet Kapllani =

Albanian diplomat (born 1943)

Foreign Minister of Albania
- In office 22 February 1991 – 6 December 1991
- Prime Minister: Fatos Nano; Ylli Bufi
- Preceded by: Reis Malile
- Succeeded by: Ilir Boçka

Personal details
- Born: 6 July 1943 (age 83) Kavajë, Kingdom of Albania

Muhamet Ismail Kapllani (born 6 July 1943, in Kavajë) is a former Albanian diplomat who served as Foreign Minister of Albania in 1991.

== Early life ==
Muhamet Kapllani was born on July 6, 1943, in the west-central town of Kavajë, present day Albania. From 1962–1966 he studied at the Faculty of Western Languages, Department of English Language and Literature, Peking University.

== Career ==
During the period from 1966 until 1974, he worked as a lecturer and head of the English language department at the University of Tirana. From 1972–1974 he served as deputy dean at the university's Foreign Languages Faculty. Later that year, he was appointed first secretary and deputy ambassador of the permanent mission of Albania to the UN in New York and remained there until 1978. From 1984–1990, Kapllani served as Deputy Minister of Foreign Affairs, in charge of international organizations. In 1991, he held the portfolio of Minister of Foreign Affairs in both the Nano and Bufi governments. He served as political adviser to president Alfred Moisiu from 2002 to 2007.
