= Elías Jaua =

Venezuelan politician (born 1969)

Elías Jaua Milano
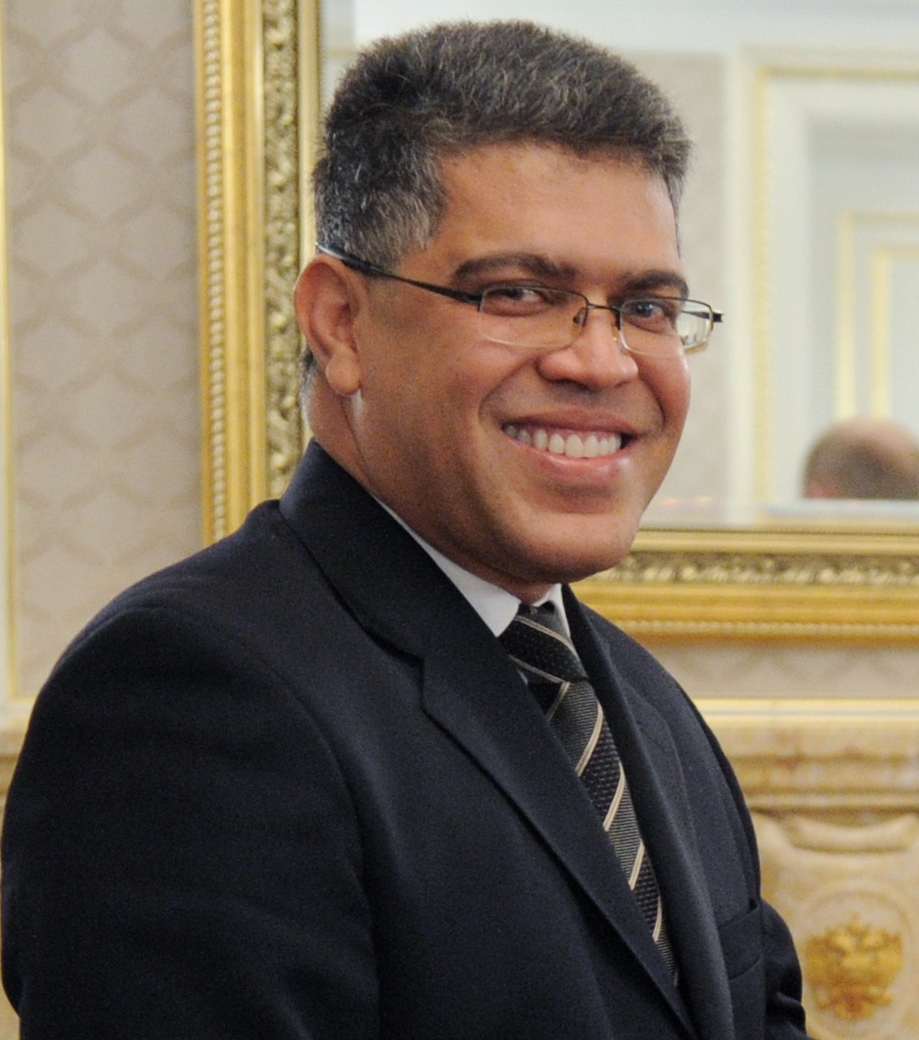
- Jaua in 2011.

Minister of Education
- In office 4 January 2017 – 4 September 2018
- President: Nicolás Maduro
- Preceded by: Rodulfo Pérez
- Succeeded by: Aristóbulo Istúriz

Deputy of the National Assembly of Venezuela
- In office 5 January 2016 – 4 January 2017
- Constituency: Miranda State

Minister of Foreign Affairs of Venezuela
- In office 15 January 2013 – 2 September 2014
- President: Hugo Chávez; Nicolás Maduro
- Preceded by: Nicolás Maduro
- Succeeded by: Rafael Ramírez

Vice President of Venezuela
- In office 27 January 2010 – 13 October 2012
- President: Hugo Chávez
- Preceded by: Ramón Carrizales
- Succeeded by: Nicolás Maduro

Minister of Agriculture
- In office 29 January 2012 – 13 October 2012
- Preceded by: Juan Carlos Loyo
- Succeeded by: Juan Carlos Loyo
- In office 24 February 2006 – 22 June 2010
- Preceded by: Antonio Albarrán
- Succeeded by: Juan Carlos Loyo

Minister of Economy
- In office 12 September 2003 – 2006

Secretary of the Presidency of Venezuela
- In office October 2000 – May 2001

Personal details
- Born: Elías José Jaua Milano; 16 December 1969 (age 56) Caucagua, Miranda, Venezuela
- Party: PSUV (since 2008)
- Other political affiliations: Fifth Republic Movement (1997-2007); Revolutionary Bolivarian Movement-200 (1996-1997)

Elías José Jaua Milano (born 16 December 1969) is a Venezuelan politician and university professor who served as the vice president of Venezuela from January 2010 to October 2012. He also served as Minister of Foreign Affairs from January 2013 until September 2014 and as Minister of Education from January 2017 to December 2018.

== Career ==
Jaua obtained a Sociology degree from the Central University of Venezuela. In 2000 he was part of the Comisión Legislativa Nacional and Minister of the Secretaría de la Presidencia from 2000 to 2001. He was nominated as Venezuelan Ambassador to Argentina in 2002. Jaua served as Minister of Agriculture in President Hugo Chávez's government before being appointed as vice-president in January 2010, while remaining Minister of Agriculture.

On 15 December 2011, following a major reshuffle of the Venezuelan political leadership, President Chávez proposed Jaua to be the PSUV candidate for governor of the state of Miranda (reported in El Universal). He resigned the vice presidency on 13 October 2012 to compete in the election and was replaced by Nicolás Maduro. He lost the election on 16 December 2012 to the former governor Henrique Capriles who had stepped down in June 2012 to unsuccessfully challenge Hugo Chávez for president.

Jaua succeeded Nicolás Maduro as Minister of Foreign Affairs on 15 January 2013.

== Sanctions ==
Jaua has been sanctioned by several countries.

On 26 July 2017, Jaua was sanctioned by the United States Department of Treasury due to his involvement with the 2017 Venezuelan Constituent Assembly election, being the Head of Venezuela's Presidential Commission for the Constituent Assembly. Canada sanctioned 40 Venezuelan officials, including Jaua, in September 2017. Canadians were banned from transactions with the 40 individuals, whose Canadian assets were frozen. On 29 March 2018, Jaua was sanctioned by Panama for his alleged involvement with "money laundering, financing of terrorism and financing the proliferation of weapons of mass destruction". On 25 June 2018, the European Union sanctioned Jaua, freezing his assets and banning him from entering the EU. On 10 July 2018, Switzerland imposed financial sanctions on Jaua and banned him from entering Switzerland.

== See also ==
- List of ministers of foreign affairs of Venezuela
- List of foreign ministers in 2013
- List of foreign ministers in 2014

Political offices
| Preceded by Ramón Carrizales | 24th Vice President of Venezuela; 27 January 2010 – 13 October 2012 | Succeeded by Nicolás Maduro |
| Preceded by Nicolás Maduro | 186th Minister of Foreign Affairs of Venezuela; 16 January 2013 – 5 March 2013 | Succeeded by Himself |
| Preceded by Himself | 187th Minister of Foreign Affairs of Venezuela; 5 March 2013 – 2 September 2014 | Succeeded by Rafael Ramírez |
