= Bularat =

Bularat Βουλιαράτες
- Village
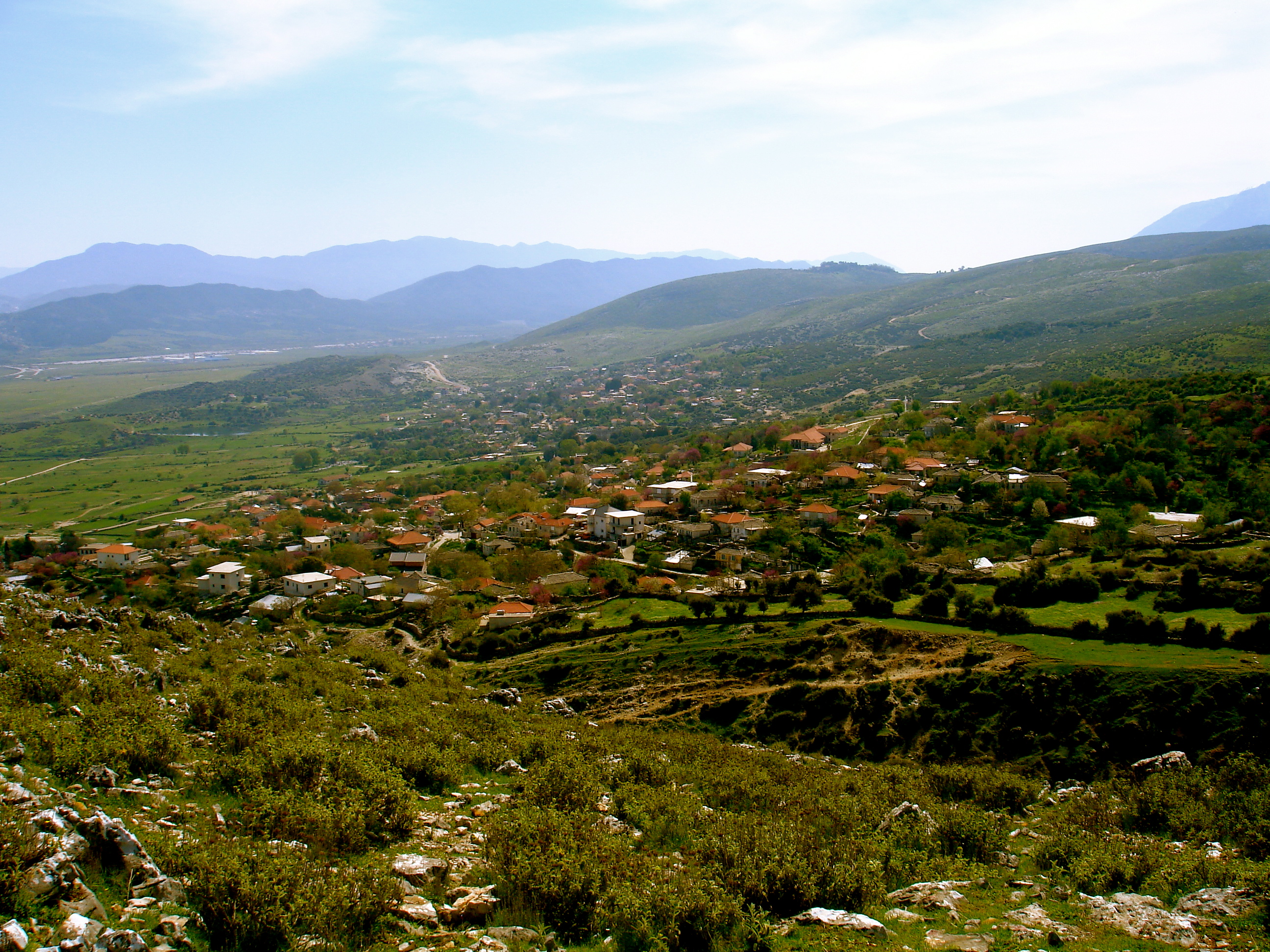
- View of the village

- Location within Albania
- Coordinates: 39°54′22″N 20°17′37″E
- Country: Albania
- County: Gjirokastër
- Municipality: Dropull
- Elevation: 350 m (1,150 ft)
- Time zone: UTC+1 (CET)
  - Summer (DST): UTC+2 (CEST)
- Website: vouliarati.altervista.org

Bularat (Albanian definite form: Bularati; Greek: Βουλιαράτες, romanized Vouliarátes) is a village in Gjirokastër County, southern Albania. At the 2015 local government reform it became part of the municipality of Dropull. It is located just six km away from the Greek–Albanian border.

== Name ==
Its name contains the Albanian suffix -at, widely used to form toponyms from personal names and surnames.

== History ==
Archeological findings (clay objects) discovered in 1979 prove that the village has been continuously inhabited since the 3rd century BC. The village has a 16th century Orthodox church, St. Athanasios. A battle occurred near the village during the Greco-Italian War, which resulted in a Greek victory with 15 casualties and 130 wounded (on the Greek side). Following the capture of the village and its surroundings by Greek forces, a temporary hospital was established to heal wounded soldiers, of whom 60 eventually died however. A military graveyard was also erected, for casualties of other nearby battles. This is still open to the public today.

The first school was established in the 1700s. It was repaired in 1830 by donations from wealthy Georgios Kouremenos, the name of which was found on an inscription of a slab. In 1905, a girls-only school was established from expenses of architect Vasilakos Kouremenos. In 1935, Albanian authorities temporarily closed the school, resulting in reactions from locals, following clashes with the Albanian gendarmerie on 17 June.

In 1993, Albanian authorities arrested the mayor of the village due to offence caused by waving of Greek flags in the village during annual celebrations commemorating Greece's entry to World War II.

== Demographics ==
According to the local newspaper, Το Γραφικό Βουλιαράτι, Bularat had 1,308 inhabitants in 1912. The village is inhabited by Greeks, and the population was 833 in 1992.

== Notable individuals ==
- Vasileios Kouremenos (el), architect and professor of the National Technical University of Athens
- Konstantinos Katsifas (el), killed by Albanian authorities on 28 October 2018

== Bibliography ==
- Γεώργιος Γ. Καλυβόπουλος, Χρήστος Γ. Καλυβόπουλος, «Μπουλιαράτι Δερόπολη». Ιστορία - Λαϊκός Πολιτισμός, Athens 1975
- Αγαθοκλής Πρ. Παναγούλιας, Όσοι δε γύρισαν από το μέτωπο: Αναφορά στους πεσόντες του Ελληνικού στρατού που φιλοξενεί το στρατιωτικό νεκροταφείο Βουλιαρατίου, έκδοση: Αγαθοκλής Πρ. Παναγούλιας, Athens 2002
- Σύνδεσμος Συνταξιούχων Ελληνοδάσκαλων Εθνικής Ελληνικής Μειονότητας Νομού Αργυροκάστρου, Τα Πανάρχαια ελληνικά χωριά του Νομού Αργυροκάστρου, Ioannina 2009
