= Mehmed Konica =

Albanian politician (1881–1948)

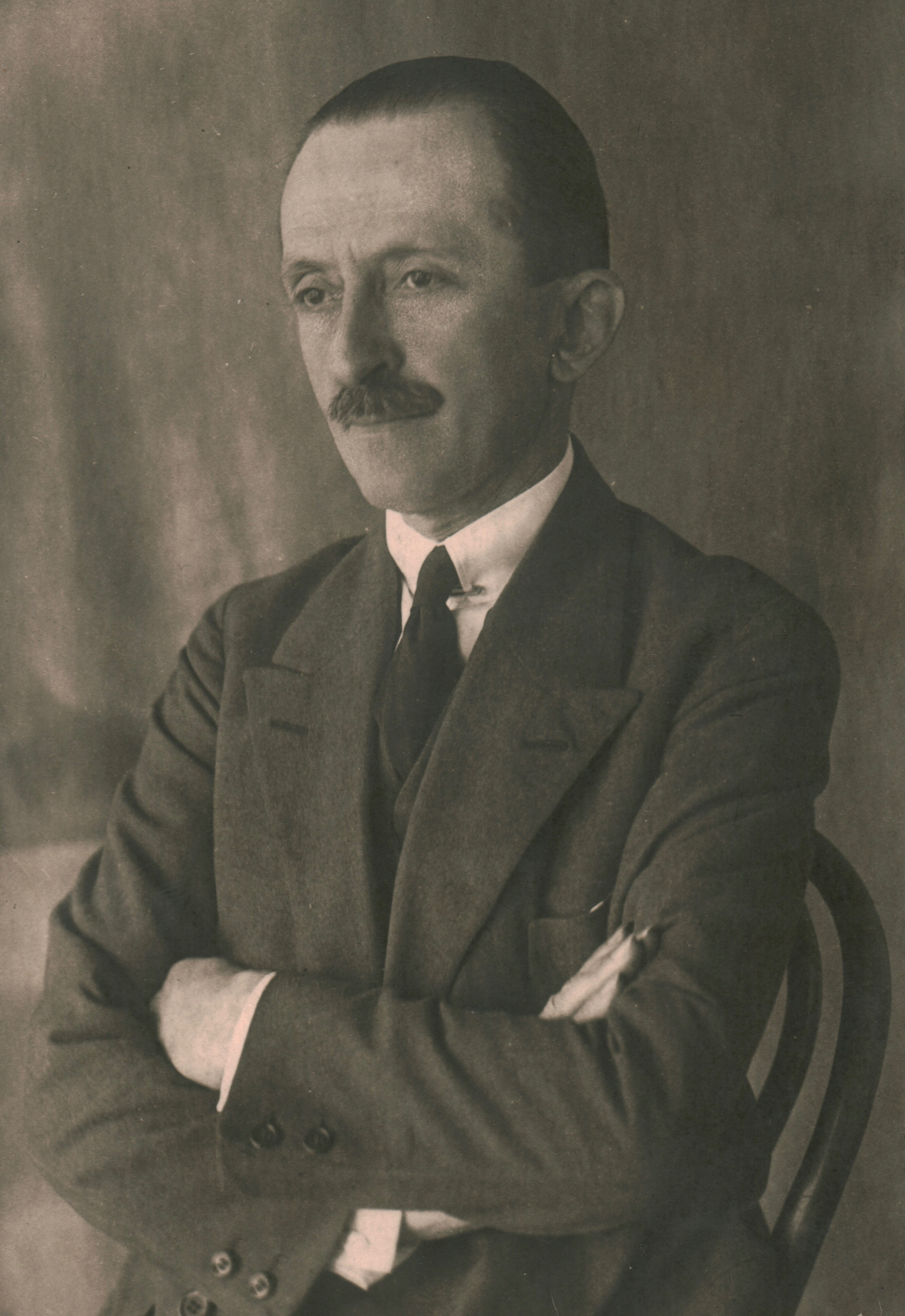
- Born: 1881; Konitsa, Janina Vilayet, Ottoman Empire (modern Greece)
- Died: 1948 (aged 66–67); Rome, Italy
- Occupation: Politician
- Known for: Foreign Minister of Albania; Congress of Durrës; Congress of Lushnje
- Parent(s): Shahin Zenelbej (Father), Lalia Zenelbej (Mother)
- Relatives: Faik Konica, Rustem Konica, Hilmi Konica (Brothers)

Mehmed Konica (1881 – 1948), was an Albanian politician. He served three times as the Foreign Minister of Albania. He was the brother of Albanian writer Faik Konica.

Konica was born in Konitsa, today's Greece, back then part of the Janina Vilayet of the Ottoman Empire. His parents were Shahin Zenelbej and Lalia Zenelbej. He was present in the Conference of Ambassadors in London in 1913. He was appointed Foreign Minister on 22 June 1914 for a short period. In 1918, he headed the Congress of Durrës and served again as Foreign Minister. After participating in the Congress of Lushnjë, he was appointed Foreign Minister once more and accompanied Fan Noli on his journey to the League of Nations. On 28 March 1922 he was appointed plenipotentiary Ambassador of Albania in the UK until 21 May 1925. Although originally an opponent of Ahmet Zogu, Konica conducted negotiations in Rome on his behalf in 1926. He served thereafter as an informal political advisor and intermediary and represented Albania at the Balkan Conferences of 1931.

During World War II, Mehmed bey Konica was initially interned in Rome by the Italians and, later, under the German occupation, was appointed Albanian Foreign Minister but refused to take up the position. He died in exile in Rome.

== See also ==
- List of Foreign Ministers of Albania
