= Murder of Gramoz Palushi =

2004 murder in Zakynthos, Greece

- Location: Zakynthos, Greece
- Date: September 4, 2004
- Attack type: Murder
- Weapon: Knife
- Deaths: Gramoz Palushi
- Perpetrator: Panagiotis Kladis

The murder of Gramoz Palushi took place on September 4, 2004, at Tsilivi village in Zakynthos, Greece, when the 20-year-old Albanian Gramoz Palushi, who was celebrating the victory of the Albania national football team against the Greece national football team, was killed by a drunk Greek during a fight that broke out after the match.

The event was followed by widespread protests in various areas of Albania and Greece. The perpetrator of the murder, Panagiotis Kladis, initially sentenced to life imprisonment, had his sentence reduced to 22 years by the Greek courts in early 2010.

== Incident ==
On September 4, 2004, after the victory of the Albania national football team against Greece, Gramoz Palushi, his brother, and another Albanian were attacked on the island of Zakynthos by Greek-American Panagiotis Kladis and another Greek fan. Gramoz Palushi was stabbed to death by Kladis, while the other two Albanians were injured. The Greek police arrested both individuals for the attack. In 2006, Panagiotis Kladis was initially sentenced to life imprisonment and in 2010 reduced to 22 years for committing murder, while his accomplice was sentenced to ten months in prison and three years of probation.

== Reactions ==
The first autumn session of the Albanian parliament began with the publication of a declaration of the deputies condemning Palushi's death. In Thessaloniki hundreds of demonstrators took part in protests held by the Albanian Immigrant Forum and Greek anti-racist groups while two days later anti-racist groups occupied the office of Panagiotis Psomiadis, who was then prefect of Thessaloniki. In Athens more than 2000 immigrants and members of Greek anti-racist groups marched on the Greek parliament to protest against racism. During the protest some anarchist groups hurled Molotov bombs at riot police that was following the protesters, while no arrest and injuries were reported. Similar protests were held in Chania and Ioannina.

In Albania youth organization held rallies in Tirana marching to the Mother Teresa Square to condemn Palushi's murder, while hundreds of people attended his funeral. The Albanian Youth Council asked Edi Rama, the mayor of the city to rename a street near the Qemal Stafa Stadium, where the match took place, after Gramoz Palushi. Additionally the Albania national football team donated 10,000 US$ to Palushi's family and the Albanian Football Association requested from FIFA to give permission to Albania to wear black mourning ribbons during its next match with Georgia.

== See also ==
- Albanians in Greece
- Greek nationalism
