= Ministry for Europe and Foreign Affairs (Albania) =

Government ministry of Albania

- Ministria për Europën dhe Punëve të Jashtme

Department overview
- Formed: 4 December 1912; 113 years ago
- Dissolved: 1939–1943
- Jurisdiction: Council of Ministers
- Headquarters: Bulevardi Zhan D'Ark 63, 1017 Tirana, Albania
- Minister responsible: Ferit Hoxha
- Website: punetejashtme.gov.al

The Ministry for Europe and Foreign Affairs (Albanian: Ministria për Europën dhe Punët e Jashtme) is a department of the Albanian Government, in charge of diplomacy, foreign policy and the process of admission of Albania into the European Union. The ministry also provides support to Albanian citizens residing abroad. In September 2017, the ministry was restructured and it was merged with the Ministry of European Integration.

== History ==
=== Establishment ===
The establishment of the Ministry of Foreign Affairs (MFA) of the modern Albanian state dates back to the creation of the Provisional Government of Vlora on December 4, 1912, a few days after declaring Albania's secession from the Ottoman Empire. The Prime Minister of the Provisional Government, Ismail Qemali, also held the post of Minister of Foreign Affairs until June 1913. Later this function passed to Myfit Bey Libohova who exercised it until the end of January 1914. The MFA in this period functioned as a section of the Provisional Government, with the main objective ensuring the recognition of Albania's independence from the Great Powers at the London Conference of Ambassadors. To accomplish this goal were also accomplished the first diplomatic services as was the diplomatic deployment of the Government of Vlora at the Ambassadorial Conference, headed by the personal diplomat of the Prime Minister, which was Rasih Dino.

=== 1914–1920 ===
On March 7, 1914, the German prince Wilhelm Friedrich Heinrich arrives in Durrës. The Prince of Albania appointed on 17 March 1914 the "definitive government". The first Prime Minister and Minister of Foreign Affairs of the newly recognized Albanian state was Turhan Pashë Përmeti, former ambassador of the Ottoman Empire in Saint Petersburg. Turhan Pasha remained foreign minister until May 28, 1914, later replaced by Prenk Bib Doda and the latter, after July, was followed by Mehmet Konica.

Since Italy and Austria-Hungary were the authors of the formula for recognition of Albania's independence, Captain Castoldi, an Italian officer, was "commanded" at the Ministry of Foreign Affairs for diplomatic missions. He and the Austrian diplomat Carl Buchberger formed the prince's political cabinet. The first official Albanian diplomatic representation was established in Vienna, represented by Syrja bey Vlora, and in Rome, represented by Myfid bej Libohova. The government and the Ministry of Foreign Affairs of Albania operated until the eve of the First World War in September 1914. On September 3, Prince William of Wied left Albania and the country turned into a theater of war in the Balkan states and the Great Powers.

=== 1920–1925 ===
In January 1920, in Lushnje, at the initiative of Albanian patriots and intellectuals of the time, a Congress was convened with representatives from all the liberated provinces of Albania, which would elect Albanian national government away from Italian influences. On January 30, 1920, the Albanian national government was created, with a broad support base.

Its prime minister was Sulejman Delvina and Minister of Foreign Affairs Mehmet Konica. Since the Peace Conference in Paris left unresolved recognition of the independence and borders of Albania, as set forth in 1913, Foreign Minister Konica immediately embarked on the key European chancellors of the time to secure their support in reaching a decision-making for Albania. To build a foreign professional service, with a special decision of the Council of Ministers, in October 1920, the Minister of Foreign Affairs, M.Konica, was asked to find a consul from the old Austrian consuls to be hired for a 2-year period for organizing Albanian consulates and serving as teachers for those who wanted to enter the consular service of Albania. Then, in August 1921, the National Council (parliament), upon the proposal of the Foreign Policy Committee, decided to open the Albanian consulates in Brindisi, Trieste and Florence.

== Officeholders (1912–present) ==
No.	Name	Term in office
1	Ismail Qemali	4 December 1912	22 January 1914
2	Turhan Pasha Përmeti	14 March 1914	20 May 1914
3	Prenk Bib Doda	28 May 1914	3 September 1914
4	Pavli Terka	5 October 1914	27 January 1916
*	Mehmed Konica (Note: The title "Substitutive" (gheg albanian: Zavëndësisht), often using the acronym "Zav.", references to the temporary exercise of duty by an official who was not formally appointed by the prime minister but occupied the interim role of the vacant minister. These officials are labeled in the list with an asterisk.) → Mehdi Frashëri (Note: Konica and Frashëri were delegates of foreign affairs.)	25 December 1918	29 January 1920
5	Mehmed Konica	30 January 1920	14 November 1920
6	Ilias Vrioni	15 November 1920	1 July 1921
7	Pandeli Evangjeli	11 July 1921	6 December 1921
8	Fan Noli	6 December 1921	12 December 1921
9	Xhafer Villa	12 December 1921	24 December 1921
–	Fan Noli (Note: Xhafer Ypi served concurrently as substitutive minister of foreign affairs.)	24 December 1921	11 September 1922
–	Pandeli Evangjeli	11 September 1922	25 February 1924
–	Ilias Vrioni	3 March 1924	10 June 1924
10	Sulejman Delvina	16 June 1924	24 December 1924
11	Gjergj Koleci → Mufid Libohova	6 January 1925	31 January 1925
12	Mufid Libohova	1 February 1925	23 September 1925
13	Hysen Vrioni	28 September 1925	10 February 1927
–	Ilias Vrioni	12 February 1927	18 April 1929
14	Rauf Fico	18 April 1929	11 April 1931
–	Hysen Vrioni	20 April 1931	7 December 1932
–	Xhafer Villa	11 January 1933	16 October 1935
15	Fuad Asllani	21 October 1935	7 November 1936
16	Ekrem Libohova	9 November 1936	7 April 1939
*	Mihal Sherko (Note: Mihal Sherko was member in charge of foreign affairs.)	8 April 1939	12 April 1939
17	Xhemil Dino	12 April 1939	25 May 1939
–	Mehmed Konica	5 November 1943	7 February 1944
18	Bahri Omari	7 February 1944	16 June 1944
*	Omer Nishani (Note: Omer Nishani was member in charge of foreign affairs.)	28 May 1944	11 January 1946
19	Eqrem Vlora	18 July 1944	28 August 1944
*	Ibrahim Biçaku (Note: Ibrahim Biçaku was substitutive minister of foreign affairs.)	6 September 1944	25 November 1944
20	Omer Nishani	23 October 1944	9 February 1946
21	Enver Hoxha	9 February 1946	31 July 1953
22	Behar Shtylla	1 August 1953	16 March 1966
23	Nesti Nase	17 March 1966	15 June 1982
24	Reis Malile	15 June 1982	21 February 1991
25	Muhamet Kapllani	22 February 1991	6 December 1991
26	Ilir Boçka	18 December 1991	13 April 1992
27	Alfred Serreqi	13 April 1992	10 July 1996
28	Tritan Shehu	11 July 1996	1 March 1997
29	Arian Starova	11 March 1997	24 July 1997
30	Paskal Milo	25 July 1997	6 September 2001
31	Arta Dade	6 September 2001	25 July 2002
32	Ilir Meta	29 July 2002	18 July 2003
33	Kastriot Islami	29 December 2003	10 September 2005
34	Besnik Mustafaj	11 September 2005	30 April 2007
35	Lulzim Basha	1 May 2007	17 September 2009
–	Ilir Meta	17 September 2009	14 September 2010
36	Edmond Haxhinasto	17 September 2010	2 July 2012
37	Edmond Panariti	3 July 2012	4 April 2013
38	Aldo Bumçi	4 April 2013	15 September 2013
39	Ditmir Bushati	15 September 2013	18 January 2019
40	Edi Rama → Gent Cakaj	22 January 2019	31 December 2020
41	Olta Xhaçka	4 January 2021	9 September 2023
42	Igli Hasani	12 September 2023	19 September 2025
43	Elisa Spiropali	19 September 2025	26 February 2026
44	Ferit Hoxha	26 February 2026	Incumbent

== See also ==
- Foreign relations of Albania
