= Death of Aristotelis Goumas =

The death of Aristotelis Goumas (Greek: Αριστοτέλης Γκούμας) took place on August 12, 2010, in Himarë, Albania, when the motorcycle of 37-year-old ethnic Greek shopkeeper Aristotelis Goumas was hit by a car driven by three Albanian men from Vlorë. According to eyewitnesses the death occurred after an altercation in Goumas' store, when the three men demanded that Goumas not speak Greek in his own store, which Goumas refused. The suspects reportedly drove over the victim at least twice to make sure he was dead.

The death sent shockwaves through the ethnic Greek community of Albania, and demonstrators blocked the main highway from Vlorë to Sarandë, which passes through the region. The event was reported by all major news outlets in both countries, and was strongly condemned by both the Greek and Albanian governments. Three suspects have been charged with murder and are awaiting trial.

== Incident ==
On the morning of Thursday, August 12, 2010, three Albanian men from the town of Vlorë accosted Goumas in his store in the predominantly ethnic Greek town of Himarë, and demanded that he not speak Greek in his own store according to eyewitnesses. According to eyewitness reports, Goumas refused, resulting in an altercation. The three men then assaulted Goumas. Several hours later, as Goumas was leaving his store, patrons at the store saw the three men leave in a hurry. Suspecting something to be amiss, friends of the 37-year-old followed them and found Goumas a short distance outside the town lying bleeding on the pavement, his motorcycle bearing marks of a hit and run. According to police reports, the suspects had rammed Goumas' motorcycle with their Audi, injuring him fatally. The suspects reportedly drove over the victim twice, so as to make sure he was dead, then fled the scene.

== Reaction ==
The death and lack of immediate police response sparked outrage throughout the Greek community in Albania. Demonstrators blocked the main highway between the towns of Vlorë and Sarandë using rocks, while municipal workers in the town of Himarë held a work stoppage. According to the Himariote Union, the death of Goumas was the culmination of a series of recent provocations in the town of Himarë by Albanian nationalists. Albanian newspapers reported that Goumas was a supporter of annexing Himara into Greece, an idea that he made part of a controversial debate with some young Kosovo Albanians, just the day before the accident. Local Greeks further called for the replacement of certain individuals in the Himarë police force, stating that attacks against ethnic Greeks have occurred frequently in the past and been duly reported, without the local police authorities showing the slightest interest.

Initial reports in the Albania news media characterized the incident as a traffic accident resulting from road rage. Albanian Prime Minister Sali Berisha issued a strong condemnation of the incident, calling it an "act of extreme and blind fanaticism" and demanding that police authorities make every effort to find the perpetrators and bring them to justice. The death of Goumas was also condemned by the main opposition Albanian Socialist Party and the Socialist Movement for Integration party.

The ethnic Greek mayor of Himarë, Vasil Bollano, spoke of a "premeditated crime" as the suspects had been "provoking the victim for days".

Vangjel Dule, leader of the Unity for Human Rights Party, which champions the rights of the Greek minority in Albania, called for restructuring of the police force in Himarë, and for greater recruitment of local Himariotes to the local force.

The death was reported by all major news outlets in Greece, and was strongly condemned by the Greek government. George Papandreou, the Prime Minister of Greece, strongly condemned the incident, adding that "the rise of nationalism among extremist groups targeting the Greek minority in Albania is a very serious matter". Greek Foreign Ministry spokesman Dimitris Delavekouras said that the perpetrators acted out of ethnic prejudice and that such incidents were designed to stir ethnic tensions and undermine Greek-Albanian relations. He called for "swift and proper" justice and further underlined that respect for minorities is one of the conditions for EU membership. The main opposition New Democracy (ND) party and the Communist Party of Greece (KKE) also sharply condemned the incident and called on the Greek government to take all necessary measures to ensure that a full investigation and judicial actions are taken. The issue was brought to the European Parliament by three Parliamentary Questions.

Concerns were raised about the police response as there were reports of threats from Albanian nationalists in the days leading up to the death. Only after the outcry following the murder did they being to treat the incident as a homicide and launch a manhunt in the region; they arrested seven individuals aged 19 to 22, while the main suspect remained at large. The main suspect, Ilir Mukaj from Vlorë, surrendered to police late on Sunday, August 15. Seven people were eventually charged in all: Three for the murder of Goumas, and the other four for hiding the murder suspects.

Several days after the incident, two cars driving on the road from Vlorë to Sarandë stopped in front of the Goumas family residence and fired bullets into the air. The Goumas family, which was in the house at the time, notified the police, who took eyewitness statements and collected bullet casings. According to diplomatic sources, there has recently been an upsurge in nationalist activity among Albanians, especially following the ruling of the International Court of Justice in favour of Kosovo's independence.

Three years after his death, members of Golden Dawn went to his grave in Himara for remembrance and after unfurling the flags of Northern Epirus and Golden Dawn, they read an anti-Albanian statement. They also attacked the Top Channel crew, preventing them from filming. There was no intervention from the Albanian police.

== See also ==
- Himarë
- Greeks in Albania
- Albanian nationalism
- Greek nationalism
- Death of Konstantinos Katsifas
