= Greece's reaction to the 2008 Kosovo declaration of independence =

Kosovo's declaration of independence from Serbia was enacted on Sunday, 17 February 2008 by a unanimous vote of the Assembly of Kosovo. All 11 representatives of the Serb minority boycotted the proceedings. International reaction was mixed, and the global community continues to be divided on the issue of the international recognition of Kosovo. Greece has not recognized Kosovo as a sovereign independent state, citing principles of International Law and UN Security Council's resolutions.

== Reaction ==
The day after the declaration, Greece stated that it would make a decision whether to recognise independent Kosovo or not after examining the issue in depth and that its decision would come as a result of close cooperation with European and neighbouring countries, bearing in mind Serbia's role in maintaining regional stability.

On 29 August 2008, following the Russo-Georgian War, a Greek foreign ministry spokesman replied in passing during a press briefing that Greece did not recognise Kosovo and will not recognise South Ossetia and Abkhazia because "the basic principle of respect for the territorial integrity and independence of states" is of "long-standing importance to, and is a fundamental constant of, the Greek foreign policy of all Greek governments".

In February 2009, a spokesman from the Greek embassy in Belgrade said that Greece has no plans to alter its stance on Kosovo despite the adoption of EP resolution calling on EU states that have not recognised Kosovo to do so. He also added that all Greek MEPs who attended the debate in Strasbourg "voted against the resolution".

In May 2009, Greece backed Kosovo's IMF bid and voted in favour of it becoming the IMF's latest member.

On 2 July 2009, President of Greece, Karolos Papoulias, stated "When it comes to Kosovo, the Greek position is well known. Our country has always been in favour of a mutually acceptable solution which would be based on international law, which would respect minority rights and would produce neither winners nor losers".

In September 2009, new Greek Prime Minister George Papandreou commented on the issue of Kosovo's independence by saying that "its unilateral recognition is a flagrant violation of international law" and added that "Greece's insistence on international law is a profoundly patriotic stance". In a June 2008 letter to French President Nicolas Sarkozy, he had stated that "unilateral declaration of independence by Kosovo and its recognition by some EU member-states in violation of the principles of International Law and UN Security Council's resolutions and without a previous decision by the EU's 27 member-states, does not contribute to the region's stability".

In September 2011, it was reported that Greece supported Kosovo's membership in the European Bank for Reconstruction and Development.

In a March 2012 interview for Gazeta Express the head of the Greek Liaison Office in Pristina, Dimitris Moschopoulos, said that the recognition by Greece will arrive step by step and is something that will come naturally. He said that Greece wants all of the Western Balkans to become part of the EU, and therefore this perspective involves recognition.

During a September 2012 address to the National Assembly of Serbia, Greek Ambassador to Serbia Dimosthenis Stoidis said that his country would not recognize Kosovo in spite of the fact that the Greek government-debt crisis had been "used in order to pressure Athens to recognize the authorities in Priština".

In December 2012, Moschopoulos said that Greece does not recognise Kosovo, but supports its European integration, and voted in favor of Kosovo as a member of the European Bank for Reconstruction and Development.

There were reports in 2015 that Prime Minister Alexis Tsipras would visit Serbia to discuss recognising Kosovo as a condition of Greece's financial bailout, yet two Belgrade newspapers wrote it would not happen and reported "it would take a miracle for Greece not to recognize Kosovo". Dusan Janjic, a political analyst, said "Tsipras will play pragmatically. He will recognize Kosovo in order to delay the issue of Northern Macedonia's name. Due to the bad situation he won't be able to conduct his own policy. He will have to make concessions, and in this case it will be recognizing Kosovo." Janjic also said that recognizing Kosovo "would be useful for establishing ties between Greece and Albania and Albanians in the region."

In February 2022, during a meeting with President of Serbia Aleksandar Vučić, Prime Minister of Greece Kyriakos Mitsotakis stated that Greece will not change its position on Kosovo, but will support the continuation of the dialogue between Kosovo and Serbia, in order to seek normalisation of relations with Kosovo.

In April 2023, Greece along with Bosnia and Herzegovina, Moldova, Slovakia and Ukraine abstained in the vote to approve Kosovo's membership in the Council of Europe.

== Relations ==
Despite not formally recognizing Kosovo, Greek authorities still maintain ties. Foreign Minister Nikos Dendias has made numerous visits to Pristina, meeting with the Prime Minister of Kosovo, the President of Kosovo and his Kosovar counterpart.

Greece maintains a liaison office in Pristina and Kosovo has a liaison office in Athens.

== See also ==
- Greece–Serbia relations
