= Edmond Panariti =

Albanian academic and politician (born 1960)

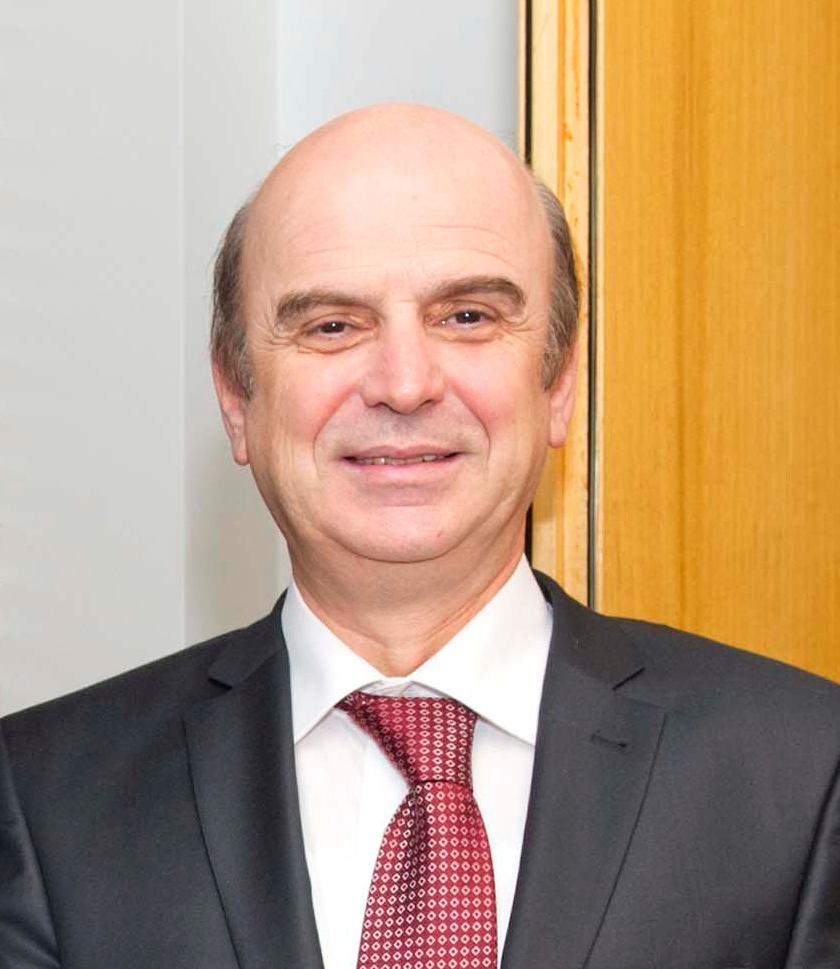

Minister of Agriculture and Rural Development
- In office 15 September 2013 – 11 September 2017
- Prime Minister: Edi Rama
- Preceded by: Genc Ruli
- Succeeded by: Niko Peleshi

Minister of Foreign Affairs
- In office 3 July 2012 – 4 April 2013
- Prime Minister: Sali Berisha
- Preceded by: Edmond Haxhinasto
- Succeeded by: Aldo Bumçi

President of the Committee of Ministers of the Council of Europe
- In office 3 July 2012 – 9 November 2012
- Preceded by: William Hague
- Succeeded by: Gilbert Saboya Sunyé

Personal details
- Born: 1 June 1960 (age 66) Tirana, Albania
- Party: Socialist Movement for Integration
- Children: 2
- Education: Agricultural University of Tirana

Edmond Panariti (born 1 June 1960) is an Albanian academic and politician, who is the former minister of foreign affairs and the former minister of agriculture and rural development.

== Early life and education ==
Panariti was born in Tirana on 1 June 1960. He studied veterinary medicine and graduated from the University of Agriculture in Tirana in 1984. He obtained a PhD in 1993 and the title of his thesis is "Tissue distribution and milk secretion of 131 I in ruminants following their experimental exposure".

== Career ==
Panariti holds academic degrees, including associate professor (1996) and full professor of toxicology (2000). He began his career as a researcher at the Department of Radiobiology of the Institute of Veterinary Research in Tirana (1984–1989). He served as the head of the Department of Environmental Toxicology at the Institute of Veterinary Research (1992–1995). Then he worked as the head of the food safety section at the Institute of Public Health (1996–1998). He became the deputy director of the Institute of Veterinary Research in 1998. His tenure lasted until 2006. During this period, he published many articles and two textbooks.

Panariti has been a member of the Socialist Movement for Integration (SMI) since 2004. In addition, he has been chairman of the national steering committee of the SMI since 2008. He was the secretary for agriculture and environment of the SMI from 2006 to 2008. He was elected to the Tirana municipality council in 2011, and was deputy mayor of Tirana from July 2011 to July 2012. Panariti was appointed minister of foreign affairs on 3 July 2012, replacing Edmond Haxhinasto. He also served as chairman of the committee of European ministers at the Council of Europe until 9 November 2012.

Panariti visited Australia on 24 and 25 August 2012, becoming the first Albanian government minister to visit the country. He met with the Australian foreign minister Bob Carr in this historical visit.

When the SMI left the coalition, its three ministers, including Panariti, resigned from office, leading to cabinet reshuffle on 3 April 2013. Therefore, Panariti was succeeded by Aldo Bumçi in the post. Panariti run for office in the parliamentary elections in June 2013, being on the list of MSI in Durrës. On 31 July 2013, Panariti was named minister of agriculture and rural development to the coalition cabinet led by the prime minister Edi Rama. The cabinet was approved by the Albanian parliament on 15 September 2013 and Panariti began his term as agriculture minister.

In 2015 the University of Perugia conferred the honorary degree in veterinary medicine on Edmond Panariti, minister of agriculture, rural development and water resources. The solemn ceremony took place in the Aula Magna according to the ceremonial dating back to the sixteenth century and was presided over by the rector Franco Moriconi.

== Personal life ==
Panariti is married and has two children.

Political offices
Preceded by Edmond Haxhinasto	Foreign Minister of Albania; 2012–2013	Succeeded by Aldo Bumçi
