= Ditmir Bushati =

Albanian politician and diplomat

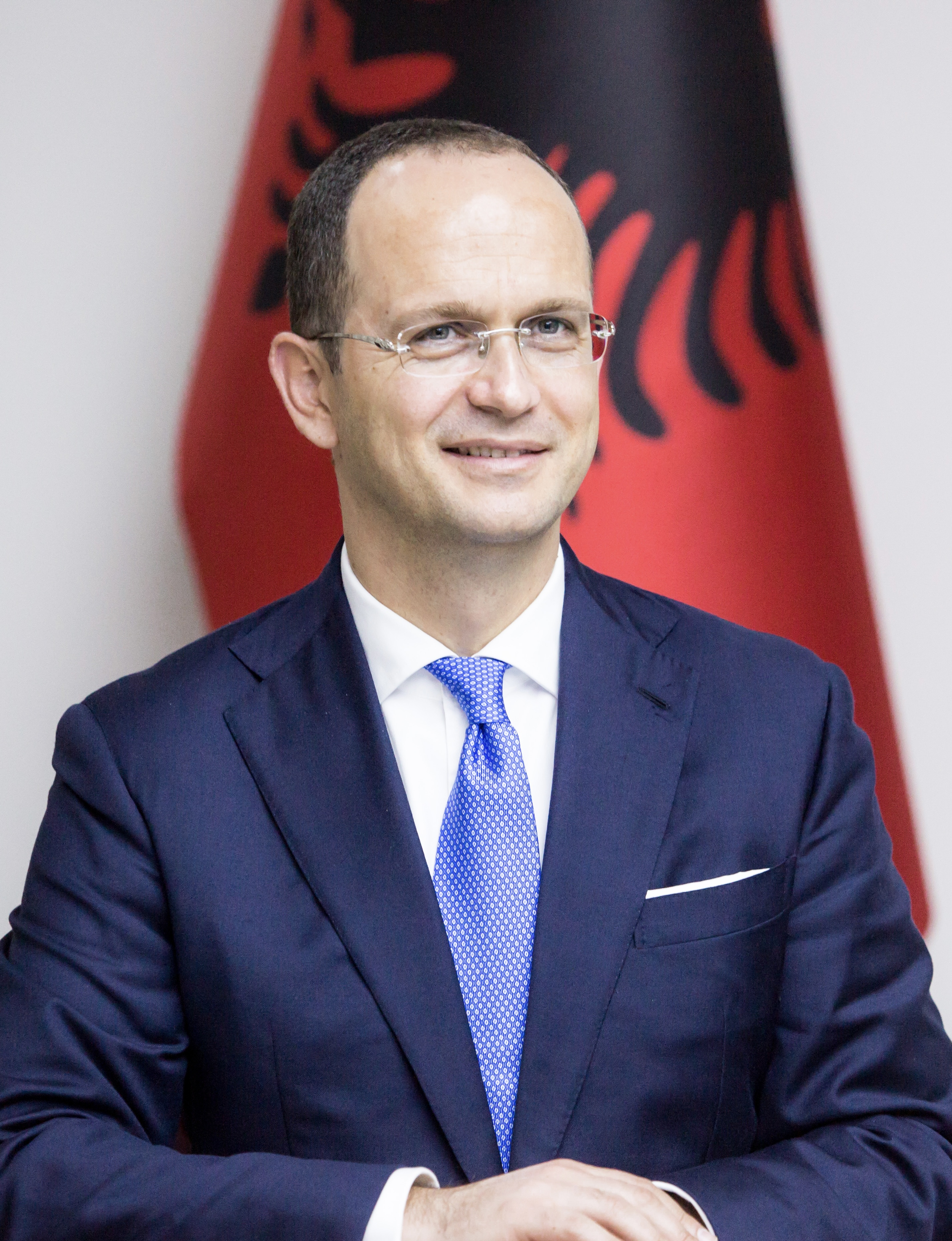

Minister of Foreign Affairs
- In office 15 September 2013 – 21 January 2019
- Prime Minister: Edi Rama
- Preceded by: Aldo Bumçi
- Succeeded by: Edi Rama; Gent Cakaj

Chairperson of the Committee for European Integration
- In office 2009–2013
- Prime Minister: Sali Berisha
- Succeeded by: Majlinda Bregu

Personal details
- Born: 24 March 1977 (age 49) Shkodër, Albania
- Party: Socialist Party
- Spouse: Aida Bushati
- Children: Hera; Martin
- Education: University of Tirana; Leiden University
- Ditmir Bushati's voice Recorded on 11 April 2017

Ditmir Bushati (born 24 March 1977) is an Albanian politician and diplomat who served as Minister of Foreign Affairs from 2013 to 2019. He previously chaired the Parliamentary Committee for European Integration.

== Early life and education ==
Bushati was born in Shkodër, Albania on March 24, 1977. Bushati graduated from the Faculty of Law of the University of Tirana in 1999 with the highest honors, and he received a master's degree in Public International Law (LL.M) from Leiden University in the Netherlands in 2001.

Bushati was a Research Fellow in Public International Law at TMC Asser Institute, in the Hague. He spent also one year as a TEMPUS Fellow in Greece at the European Public Law Centre of the University of Athens, specializing in EU Law, and has received a diploma from the Kennedy School of Government of Harvard University and from the Academy of American and International Law, Dallas and Abo Academy University, Finland.

Bushati has lectured on European Law and the EU enlargement process at different institutions and universities in Albania and Kosovo. He has published numerous scientific papers and articles in areas related to the EU enlargement process, public international law and European law. He is fluent in English and Italian, and has good knowledge of French.

== Career ==
=== Civil society positions ===
Prior to his political career Ditmir Bushati was a civil society leader and a Founding Director of the European Movement Albania (EMA).

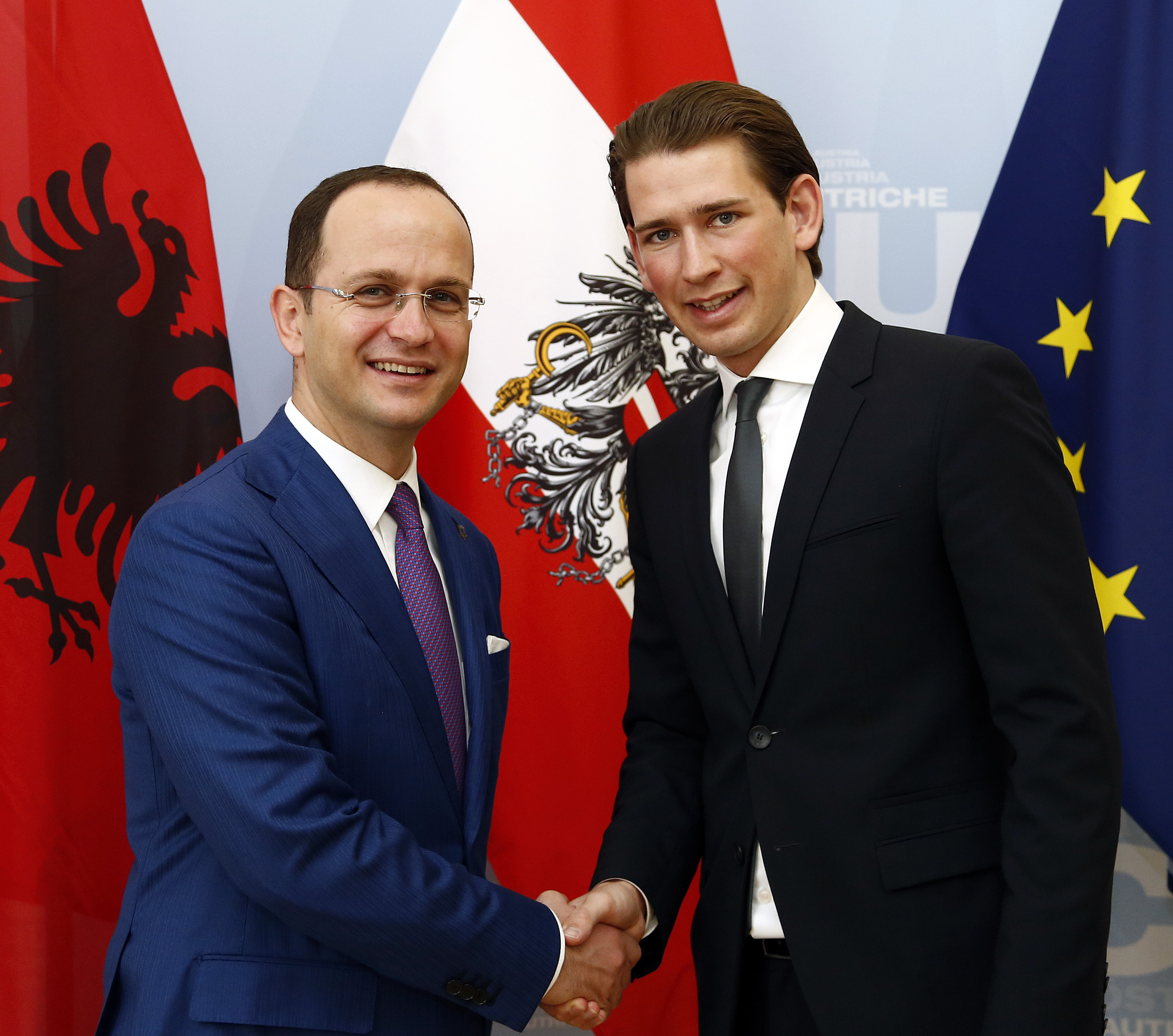
Bushati meeting with Sebastian Kurz in 2014

He is a member of European Council on Foreign Affairs and has also served as analyst for Freedom House (2007-2008) for the Nations in Transition Report, National Reporter for the European Society of International Law (ESIL), and National Coordinator of the Open Society Foundations' project monitoring Albania's progress in the European integration process (2006-2008). He has worked as consultant for various projects of the EU, WB, USAID, GIZ, OSI, Friedrich Ebert Stiftung, IOM, SNV.

=== Civil service ===
Ditmir Bushati served as Director for Legal Approximation at the Albanian Ministry of European Integration. In that capacity he was part of the team negotiating the Stabilization and Association Agreement with the European Union (SAA). Bushati worked as Advisor on European Affairs to the Deputy Prime Minister, as Legal Advisor to the Constitutional Court, the Office of the President of the Republic of Albania and the International Criminal Tribunal for the former Yugoslavia.

=== Political career ===
Standing as a candidate of the Socialist Party of Albania, Bushati was first elected as a Member of Parliament for the Tirana District in the 2009 parliamentary election. He was re-elected in the June 2013 parliamentary elections for the same district.

As an MP, he chaired the Parliamentary Committee for European Integration (2011-2013) and was a member of the Joint EU-Albania Parliamentary Committee (2009-2013). In November 2011, Bushati was elected as a Member of the Steering Committee of the Socialist Party.

He served as Minister of Foreign Affairs from September 2013, when he replaced Aldo Bumçi, to December 2018, when he was replaced by Gent Cakaj.

In August 2016, he met with Chinese State Councilor Yang Jiechi at Zhongnanhai to discussion Albania-Chinese relations In January 2017, he called for cooperation with Iran in matters concerning energy, agriculture, and tourism after a two-day stay in Tehran.

=== Later career ===
In 2020, the government of Prime Minister Rama nominated Bushati as its candidate for the post as Representative on Freedom of the Media of the Organization for Security and Co-operation in Europe (OSCE).

== Other activities ==
- European Council on Foreign Relations (ECFR), Member

== Personal life ==
He is married to Aida Bushati and they have two children, Hera and Martin. Ditmir Bushati is the great grandson of Süleyman Bushati. He is a part of the Bushati family a feudal Albanian family in the Ottoman era.

== See also ==
- List of current foreign ministers
- List of ministers of foreign affairs of Albania

Political offices
Preceded by Aldo Bumçi	68th Foreign Minister of Albania; 15 September 2013–28 December 2018	Succeeded by Edi Rama
