= Part Six =

Part Six, Part 6 or Part VI may refer to:

== Television ==
- "Part 6" (True Detective), an episode of True Detective
- "Part 6" (Twin Peaks), an episode of Twin Peaks
- "Part VI" (Lawmen: Bass Reeves), an episode of Lawmen: Bass Reeves
- "Part VI" (Obi-Wan Kenobi), an episode of Obi-Wan Kenobi
- "Part Six" (The Pacific), an episode of The Pacific
- "Part Six" (Your Honor), an episode of Your Honor
- "Part Six: Far, Far Away", an episode of Ahsoka

== Other uses ==
- Part VI of the Albanian Constitution

== See also ==
- PT6 (disambiguation)
