= Part Seven =

Part Seven, Part 7 or Part VII may refer to:

== Television ==
- "Part 7" (Twin Peaks), an episode of Twin Peaks
- "Part VII" (Lawmen: Bass Reeves), an episode of Lawmen: Bass Reeves
- "Part Seven" (The Pacific), an episode of The Pacific
- "Part Seven" (Your Honor), an episode of Your Honor
- "Part Seven: Dreams and Madness", an episode of Ahsoka

== Other uses ==
- Part VII of the Albanian Constitution
- Part VII transfer

== See also ==
- PT-7 (disambiguation)
