= Part Four =

Part Four, Part 4 or Part IV may refer to:

== Television ==
- "Part 4" (True Detective), an episode of True Detective
- "Part 4" (Twin Peaks), an episode of Twin Peaks
- "Part IV" (Lawmen: Bass Reeves), an episode of Lawmen: Bass Reeves
- "Part IV" (Obi-Wan Kenobi), an episode of Obi-Wan Kenobi
- "Part Four" (Lego Star Wars: Rebuild the Galaxy), an episode of Lego Star Wars: Rebuild the Galaxy
- "Part Four" (The Pacific), an episode of The Pacific
- "Part Four" (Your Honor), an episode of Your Honor
- "Part Four: Fallen Jedi", an episode of Ahsoka

== Other uses ==
- Part IV of the Albanian Constitution

== See also ==
- PT4 (disambiguation)
