= Constitution of the Albanian Kingdom =

Constitution of the Albanian Kingdom may refer to:

- Fundamental Statute of the Kingdom of Albania (1928), imposed by King Zog when Albania became a kingdom
- Fundamental Statute of the Kingdom of Albania (1939), imposed by Italy after conquering Albania
