= Part 8 =

Part Eight, Part 8 or Part VIII may refer to:

== Television ==
- "Part 8" (Twin Peaks), an episode of Twin Peaks
- "Part VIII" (Lawmen: Bass Reeves), an episode of Lawmen: Bass Reeves
- "Part Eight" (The Pacific), an episode of The Pacific
- "Part Eight" (Your Honor), an episode of Your Honor
- "Part Eight: The Jedi, the Witch, and the Warlord", an episode of Ahsoka

== Other uses ==
- Remembering the Fireballs (Part 8), an album by the American band Lync
- JoJolion, a seinen manga series and the eighth part of the larger JoJo's Bizarre Adventure series
- Part VIII of the Albanian Constitution
- Part Eight of the Constitution of India, defining the union territories of India

== See also ==
- PT-8 (disambiguation)
