= Part Three =

Part Three, Part 3 or Part III may refer to:

== Music ==
- Part 3 (KC and the Sunshine Band album)
- Part III (112 album) (2001 album), R&B album by 112
- "Part Three into Paper Walls", a song by Russell Morris

== Television ==
- "Part 3" (True Detective), an episode of True Detective
- "Part 3" (Twin Peaks), an episode of Twin Peaks
- "Part III" (Lawmen: Bass Reeves), an episode of Lawmen: Bass Reeves
- "Part III" (Obi-Wan Kenobi), an episode of Obi-Wan Kenobi
- "Part Three" (Lego Star Wars: Rebuild the Galaxy), an episode of Lego Star Wars: Rebuild the Galaxy
- "Part Three" (The Pacific), an episode of The Pacific
- "Part Three" (Your Honor), an episode of Your Honor
- "Part Three: Time to Fly", an episode of Ahsoka

== Other uses ==
- Brahmāstra: Part Three, third part of the Astraverse series of Indian superhero films, to be released in 2027
- Sangliyana Part 3, a 1997 Indian film
- Part III of the Albanian Constitution
- Part III of the Constitution of India, defining fundamental rights in India
- Part III of the Mathematical Tripos
- MPEG-4 Part 3

== See also ==
- PT3 (disambiguation)
