= PT2 =

PT2 or its variants may refer to:

- New Horizons PT2 aka 2014 OS393
- Pratt & Whitney PT2 company designation for the Pratt & Whitney T34 turboprop aircraft engine
- PT-2, a pre-World War II US Navy PT-boat.
- Prison Tycoon 2: Maximum Security (2006 videogame)
- PT2, a Para triathlon classification
- Pt. 2, a 2016 single by Kanye West

== See also ==
- Part Two (disambiguation)
