= Part 14 =

Part Fourteen, Part 14 or Part XIV may refer to:

== Television ==
- "Part 14" (Twin Peaks), an episode of Twin Peaks
- "Part Fourteen" (Your Honor), an episode of Your Honor

== Other uses ==
- Part XIV of the Albanian Constitution
- Part XIV of the Constitution of India
