= Part Two =

Part Two, Part 2 or Part II may refer to:

== Music ==
=== Albums ===
- Part 2 (Brix & the Extricated album), 2017
- Part II (Brad Paisley album), 2001
- Part II (Lil Jon & the East Side Boyz album), 2003
- Part Two (Throbbing Gristle album), 2007

=== Songs ===
- "Part II" (Method Man & Redman song), a 2001 single by Method Man & Redman from the soundtrack to How High
- ""Part II" (Paramore song), a 2013 song by Paramore from Paramore
- "Part II (On the Run)", a 2014 single by Jay-Z and Beyoncé
- "Pt. 2", a 2016 single by Kanye West, the second part of "Father Stretch My Hands"

== Television ==
- "Part 2" (True Detective), an episode of True Detective
- "Part 2" (Twin Peaks), an episode of Twin Peaks
- "Part II" (Lawmen: Bass Reeves), an episode of Lawmen: Bass Reeves
- "Part II" (Obi-Wan Kenobi), an episode of Obi-Wan Kenobi
- "Part Two" (Lego Star Wars: Rebuild the Galaxy), an episode of Lego Star Wars: Rebuild the Galaxy
- "Part Two" (The Pacific), an episode of The Pacific
- "Part Two" (Your Honor), an episode of Your Honor
- "Part Two: Toil and Trouble", an episode of Ahsoka

== Other uses ==
- Part 2, Sounder, 1976 film
- Part II, a stage of the qualification process in the UK to become an architect
- Part II of the Albanian Constitution
- Part II of the Constitution of India, pertaining to Indian nationality law
- MPEG-4 Part 2

== See also ==
- PT2 (disambiguation)
