= 1998 Albanian coup attempt =

Attempted coup d'etat by the Democratic Party of Albania

Date	14 September 1998
Location	Tirana, Albania
Result	Coup failed: Government forces retake control of institutions.; Immunity of Sali Berisha lifted.; Nano III Government subsequently resigns on 28 September.

Belligerents
Democratic Party	Government of Albania

Commanders and leaders
Sali Berisha; Ridvan Bode; Genc Pollo; Ekrem Spahiu	(Albania) Fatos Nano (Albania) Perikli Teta (Albania) Skënder Gjinushi

Units involved
PD protesters and militants	Republican Guard; State Police; RENEA

The 1998 Albanian coup attempt was an armed political uprising in Tirana from 13 to 15 September 1998, during which supporters of the opposition Democratic Party of Albania seized the offices of Prime Minister Fatos Nano, the parliament building, the headquarters of Albanian state television and radio, and several tanks. The unrest followed the assassination of Azem Hajdari, a founding Democratic Party politician and former leader of the 1990 anti-communist student movement, on 12 September.

The violence began with an attack on the Prime Minister's Office on 14 September. It escalated during Hajdari's funeral later that day, when armed demonstrators overran several state institutions, commandeered armoured vehicles and briefly controlled parts of central Tirana. Special police units recaptured the buildings within hours. The remaining armed supporters withdrew to the Democratic Party headquarters, where they maintained a brief standoff with police before returning two tanks.

The Nano government called the events an attempted coup d'état and accused former president and Democratic Party leader Sali Berisha of organising them. Berisha denied attempting a coup and claimed that government guards had provoked the violence. The International Crisis Group subsequently described the events as an attempted coup by opposition forces, while Human Rights Watch more cautiously referred to Berisha's role in what the government called a coup d'état. Parliament lifted Berisha's immunity on 18 September, clearing the way for possible prosecution, but he was not arrested or ultimately tried as the organiser of the uprising.

Contemporary casualty figures varied. Radio Free Europe/Radio Liberty and the Los Angeles Times reported three deaths and 14 injuries during the government counter-operation, while the United States Department of State reported at least four deaths across the several days of protest and rioting.

The uprising failed to remove the government immediately, but it deepened an existing crisis inside the governing coalition. Nano resigned on 28 September after failing to secure sufficient support for a cabinet reshuffle and was replaced by Pandeli Majko.

== Terminology ==
The classification of the events became politically contested immediately. Nano, Teta and Socialist Party officials called them an attempted coup d'état led by Berisha. Parliament's subsequent decision to lift Berisha's immunity was based on a prosecutor's request concerning an alleged armed uprising against the constitutional order.

The International Crisis Group described 14 September as an attempted coup by opposition forces and identified Berisha as having been accused by Nano of acting as its principal organiser. The Los Angeles Times, several other contemporary newspapers and later political histories also used the term "coup attempt".

Berisha and the Democratic Party rejected the description. Berisha said he had not attempted to seize power and portrayed the unrest as an uncontrolled popular reaction to a political assassination. His recorded broadcast calling on demonstrators not to destroy institutions was cited by his supporters as evidence that he sought to restrain the crowd.

Human Rights Watch adopted more qualified wording, describing armed Democratic Party supporters' attack and noting that Parliament lifted Berisha's immunity for his role in what the government called a coup d'état. The United States Department of State referred to the episode as anti-government rioting and an armed uprising without making a definitive finding that Berisha had directed it.

== Background ==
=== Political crisis after 1997 ===
Albania entered 1998 still recovering from the collapse of fraudulent pyramid investment schemes and the resulting nationwide disorder of 1997. Military depots had been looted, placing hundreds of thousands of weapons in civilian hands, while police and central-government authority remained weak in several regions. The Socialist Party and its allies had won the 1997 Albanian parliamentary election, replacing the Democratic Party government of Sali Berisha. International observers considered the election acceptable under the exceptional circumstances, but the Democratic Party disputed its legitimacy and frequently boycotted Parliament.

Nano formed a coalition government in July 1997. Political relations remained intensely confrontational. The opposition accused the Socialists of using criminal groups and state institutions to persecute Democratic Party supporters, while government figures alleged that Berisha was attempting to destabilise the country and block institutional reconstruction.

The confrontation intensified in August 1998 after prosecutors arrested six former Democratic government officials—including former defence and interior ministers—on charges related to the state's violent response to the 1997 unrest. The Democratic Party denounced the cases as political prosecutions and organised street demonstrations.

The country was also affected by the escalating Kosovo War. Refugees crossed into northern Albania, weapons and supplies moved through the border region, and the government exercised limited authority around Tropojë and other northeastern districts. International organisations warned that renewed political violence in Tirana could destabilise both Albania and the wider region.

=== Assassination of Azem Hajdari ===
On the evening of 12 September 1998, gunmen shot Hajdari and his bodyguard Besim Çera outside the Democratic Party headquarters. Both died, while a second bodyguard was seriously wounded. Hajdari was a member of Parliament, a founding Democratic Party figure and one of the most recognisable leaders of the student movement that had helped end one-party communist rule.

Berisha immediately accused Nano's government of organising the assassination and demanded its resignation. The government denied involvement and offered a reward for information leading to the killers. Human Rights Watch and the United States Department of State later stated that no conclusive evidence supported the Democratic Party's accusation of government responsibility.

Hajdari's death generated anger among Democratic Party supporters and among people from his native Tropojë. The killing occurred in an atmosphere of widespread weapons possession, political mistrust and rumours that the government or opposition was preparing to use force.

== Timeline ==
=== 13 September ===
- 00:30: The Democratic Party gives a press conference. Berisha declares: "Azem was killed by Nano and Slobodan. In his first assassination attempt, he had told me: I am happy to die for you. He was talking about democracy".
- 08:30: The Ministry of Public Order offers 50-100 thousand USD for information on the event.
- 10:00: The Democratic Party gives a press conference. Berisha declares that "Nano must resign within 24 hours". The Chairman of the Democratic Party for Tirana, Vili Minarolli, declared that "three days of mourning should be held". Interior Minister Perikli Teta stated in TVSH: "One of the scenarios of the murder is one of the versions of the DP that accuses the chief of order of the Tropoja Police Station, Jaho Salihi, as the author". The Ministry of Public Order announces the search for the murderer. Teta states that "Salihi reported to work at 07:15 of this day". His presence is confirmed by the government's representative in this district, Taulant Dedja.
- 10:10: The Democratic Party gave a press conference while a billboard was installed outside the headquarters in front of which there were thousands of sympathizers. Berisha stated: "We have information that Prime Minister Nano's spokesman today in the name of Nano gave the murderer his [Nano's] blessing. The murderer is Fatos Nano. He has only 24 hours. If he does not resign, we won't be able to contain the crowds".

=== 14 September ===
- 10:00: The Prime Minister’s Press Office notifies that “armed groups who want to destablize order will be struck down”.
- 10:30: 2000 PD militants begin a protest march towards the Prime Minister’s Office. Militants fail to seize the Ministry of Public Order. Nevertheless all parked cars there are destroyed.
- 11:00: Following Hajdari’s funeral participants do not head to the Sharra Cemetery but to the Prime Minister’s Office. Berisha returns to the PD headquarters. The government begins an emergency cabinet meeting in order to discuss the circumstances of the murder and possible measures following it, but the meeting is interrupted by protesters attacking the PM’s Office. The offices of the first floor are destroyed. 8 cars behind the building are burned. Dozens of armed people enter. Nano and his cabinet leave from the back door.
- 11:45: A group of people take the casket to the Prime Minister’s Office. The building is attacked with firearms and grenades.
- 12:00: While the procession was nearing the PM’s Office, station 324 near the Ministry of Public Order was attacked. 100 firearms and grenades were stolen there. The Republican Guard sends tanks to quell the unrest but they are taken by the rioters.
- 13:00: Hundreds of armed militants destroy and burn the PM’s office and urinate there. Parliament is attacked. A grenade is thrown in the office of Speaker Skënder Gjinushi.
- 13:30: The Constitutional Court, Ministry of Justice, and Ministry of Culture are seized.
- 14:00: RTSH is seized. Around 200 armed militants surround the building while the Chariman of PLL Ekrem Spahia is interviewed by director Artur Bejzade and Alfons Zeneli. Director Edi Mazi and Radio director Martin Leka are taken hostage.
- 14:10: Lootings and burnings of shops in Central Tirana occur.
- 15:00: Police forces begin to quell the unrest. Police forces of Commisariat 3 in Tirana led by Neritan Nallbati retake the ministries.
- 16:00: Police forces set out massively in Tirana. Police alongside RENEA special forces defend local businesses and retake control of seized institutions.
- Afternoon: US Ambassador Marisa Lino, declares that “Hajdari’s death must not be exploited politically” and that “albanians must remain calm”. The US Department of State condemns the coup attempt and declares that “it will not recognize any government installed through violence”. US and EU ambassadors urge Nano to not resign and promise that they will “not recognize any government instated through violence”. The Italian Government holds a cabinet meeting. PM Romano Prodi states that “the violence in Albania must stop”.
- 19:00: Perikli Teta gives an ultimatum for the handover of RTSH.
- 19:30: Armed PD groups surrender. Perikli Teta declares that “the coup attempt failed”.
- 20:00: An armed individual attempts to assassinate Perikli Teta. The person is shot and killed by Teta‘s guards.

== Government and international response ==
Nano appealed to citizens to defend Albania's democratic institutions and warned that the violence could return the country to the chaos of 1997. The Interior Ministry imposed restrictions on demonstrations and announced that police could fire without warning if confronted by armed resistance.

President Rexhep Meidani sought dialogue between the government and opposition. International organisations backed his effort and urged all political leaders to accept responsibility for the conduct of their supporters.

NATO secretary-general Javier Solana called on demonstrators and political leaders to show restraint and preserve Albania's democratic institutions. The United States urged the government to work with Meidani on proposals to end the crisis and warned party leaders that they would bear responsibility for their followers' behaviour.

The OSCE Parliamentary Assembly stated that any attempt to overthrow the lawful government or undermine the elected Parliament had to be rejected, while also calling on the government to respect the opposition's rights. The OSCE and the Council of Europe sent a high-level mission to Albania. The European Union requested an urgent assessment of possible international police assistance to help restore law and order.

The Parliamentary Assembly of the Council of Europe condemned Hajdari's assassination and the subsequent violence, demanded respect for constitutional government and called for an independent investigation into the killing.

== Aftermath ==
=== Standoff and protests, 15–16 September ===
Despite a government prohibition on demonstrations, Berisha led about 1,000 supporters in a peaceful march through Tirana on 15 September. The two seized tanks remained outside the Democratic Party headquarters during the rally.

Berisha publicly denied attempting a coup. He described the accusation as absurd and claimed that government security personnel had initiated the clashes during the funeral. Nano and government spokesman Ben Blushi blamed Berisha, his bodyguards and political collaborators for the violence.

The captured tanks were subsequently returned to the Republican Guard. Armed supporters withdrew from their positions around the party headquarters, although contemporary reporting indicated that not all privately held weapons were surrendered. A further Democratic Party march on 16 September passed without major violence.

=== Lifting of Berisha's immunity ===
On 18 September, Parliament voted overwhelmingly to remove Berisha's parliamentary immunity, allowing prosecutors to seek his arrest on allegations that he had attempted to overthrow the government. Democratic Party members boycotted or rejected the proceedings and warned that an arrest could provoke renewed unrest.

Berisha was not arrested. Human Rights Watch reported that he remained free as of October 1998, and the political authorities gradually stepped back from a confrontation that could have reignited violence.

Police arrested or sought several lower-ranking Democratic Party supporters and members of allied opposition organisations on armed-uprising charges. The chairman of the monarchist Legality Movement Party was among those detained. The United States Department of State noted concerns that some prosecutions appeared influenced by political considerations and that the government had disclosed little evidence by the end of 1998.

A later trial concerning the September riots did not result in convictions of prominent Democratic Party leaders.

=== Resignation of Fatos Nano ===
Nano initially refused calls to resign. The unrest nevertheless weakened his authority within the Socialist Party and its coalition partners. Several senior officials criticised corruption and the government's handling of the crisis, while Interior Minister Teta resigned. On 28 September, Nano unexpectedly resigned after failing to obtain sufficient political support for a cabinet reshuffle. The Socialist Party selected Pandeli Majko, then 31 years old, as prime minister.

=== Constitutional process ===
The crisis disrupted Albania's constitutional reform process. The Democratic Party had already boycotted much of the drafting process and continued its opposition after the September events. A new constitution was nevertheless approved in the 1998 Albanian constitutional referendum on 22 November.

International organisations treated the adoption of a constitutional framework and restoration of parliamentary dialogue as essential to preventing a return to political violence.

== See also ==
- Assassination of Azem Hajdari
- 1997 Albanian civil unrest
- 1998 Albanian constitutional referendum
- Democratic Party of Albania
- Fatos Nano
- Sali Berisha
- List of coups and coup attempts
