= Part 9 =

Part Nine, Part 9 or Part IX may refer to:

== Television ==
- "Part 9" (Twin Peaks), an episode of Twin Peaks
- "Part Nine" (The Pacific), an episode of The Pacific
- "Part Nine" (Your Honor), an episode of Your Honor

== Other uses ==
- Part IX of the Albanian Constitution
