= Part 16 =

Part Sixteen, Part 16 or Part XVI may refer to:

== Television ==
- "Part 16" (Twin Peaks), an episode of Twin Peaks
- "Part Sixteen" (Your Honor), an episode of Your Honor

== Other uses ==
- Part XVI of the Albanian Constitution
- Part XVI of the Constitution of India
