= 0.4 =

0.4, .4, point four, or dot four may refer to:

- The number 0.4 as a fractional number
- 0.4 shot, a basketball shot made by player Derek Fisher with 0.4 seconds left in Game 5 of the NBA 2004 Western Conference Semifinals
- Point4, a songwriting team from the UK composed of Pete Day, Phil Dyson, Paul (Bronze) Newton, and Daniel Sherman
- Point Four Program, a technical assistance program for "developing countries" announced by US President Harry S. Truman in his inaugural address on January 20, 1949
- DOT 4, a type of brake fluid
- Braille pattern dots-4, ( ⠈ ) is a 6-dot or 8-dot braille cell with the top right dot raised

== See also ==
- PT4 (disambiguation)
- 4/10 (disambiguation)
