= Part 18 =

Part Eighteen, Part 18 or Part XVIII may refer to:

== Television ==
- "Part 18" (Twin Peaks), an episode of Twin Peaks
- "Part Eighteen" (Your Honor), an episode of Your Honor

== Other uses ==
- Part XVIII of the Albanian Constitution
- Part XVIII of the Constitution of India
