= PT3 =

PT3 or variant may refer to:

- temporary designation of minor planet 2014 PN70
- Consolidated PT-3, a 1930s USAAC primary trainer aircraft
- PT-3, a World War II US Navy PT-boat.
- Prison Tycoon 3: Lockdown (2007 videogame)
- PT3, a Para triathlon classification
- PT3 Pentaksiran Tingkatan Tiga (or Form Three Assessment) exam, successor of Malaysian Penilaian Menengah Rendah

== See also ==
- Part three (disambiguation)
