= PT5 =

PT5 or variants may refer to:

- Pratt & Whitney PT5 a turboprop engine variant of the J57 turbojet engine, given the military designation T57
- Consolidated XPT-5, an experimental variant of the PT-3 training airplane
- PT-5, a pre-World War II US Navy PT-boat.
- PT5, a Para triathlon classification
- Prison Tycoon: Alcatraz (2010 videogame), 5th game in the Prison Tycoon series
- 2024 PT5, a near-Earth object
