= Part 10 =

Part Ten, Part 10 or Part X may refer to:

== Television ==
- "Part 10" (Twin Peaks), an episode of Twin Peaks
- "Part Ten" (The Pacific), an episode of The Pacific
- "Part Ten" (Your Honor), an episode of Your Honor

== Other uses ==
- Part X of the Albanian Constitution
