= Extraordinary measures =

Extraordinary measures may refer to:

- Financial measures taken when the United States government nears its debt ceiling
- Extraordinary Measures (film), a 2010 medical drama
- Part XVI of the Albanian Constitution, titled Extraordinary Measures
