= Part Five =

Part Five, Part 5 or Part V may refer to:

== Television ==
- "Part 5" (True Detective), an episode of True Detective
- "Part 5" (Twin Peaks), an episode of Twin Peaks
- "Part V" (Lawmen: Bass Reeves), an episode of Lawmen: Bass Reeves
- "Part V" (Obi-Wan Kenobi), an episode of Obi-Wan Kenobi
- "Part Five" (The Pacific), an episode of The Pacific
- "Part Five" (Your Honor), an episode of Your Honor
- "Part Five: Shadow Warrior", an episode of Ahsoka

== Other uses ==
- Part V of the Albanian Constitution
