= Part 13 =

Part Thirteen, Part 13 or Part XIII may refer to:

== Television ==
- "Part 13" (Twin Peaks), an episode of Twin Peaks
- "Part Thirteen" (Your Honor), an episode of Your Honor

== Other uses ==
- Part XIII of the Albanian Constitution
- Part XIII of the Constitution of India
