= Part 12 =

Part Twelve, Part 12 or Part XII may refer to:

== Television ==
- "Part 12" (Twin Peaks), an episode of Twin Peaks
- "Part Twelve" (Your Honor), an episode of Your Honor

== Other uses ==
- Part XII of the Albanian Constitution
- Part XII of the Constitution of India
