= Part 15 (disambiguation) =

Part Fifteen, Part 15 or Part XV may refer to:

== Television ==
- "Part 15" (Twin Peaks), an episode of Twin Peaks
- "Part Fifteen" (Your Honor), an episode of Your Honor

== Other uses ==
- Part XV of the Albanian Constitution
- Part XV of the Constitution of India
- Title 47 CFR Part 15
