= Constitution of Albania =

Supreme law of Albania

The present Constitution of the Republic of Albania (Albanian: Kushtetuta e Republikës së Shqipërisë) was adopted by the Parliament of Albania on 21 October 1998 and certified by presidential decree on 28 November 1998, following a public referendum which approved the new Constitution. It is split up over many different acts. The document succeeded the 1976 Constitution, originally adopted at the creation of the People's Socialist Republic of Albania on 28 December 1976 and heavily amended on 29 April 1991.

The present Constitution defines Albania as a unitary parliamentary constitutional republic. It has a unicameral legislature composed of 140 members, who elect the President as the head of state, the Cabinet, which consists of the Prime Minister as the head of government, Deputy Prime Minister and all other Ministers.

The Constitution is divided into 18 parts which sanction a parliamentary democracy, people's sovereignty and fundamental rights of the citizens as well as other important points. The Constitution is said to have fulfilled all the requirements for a modern European constitution.

Due to political instability, Albania has had many constitutions during its history. The modern state was initially constituted as a monarchy in 1913, briefly a republic in the 1920s, then it returned to a monarchy in 1928. It later became a socialist republic until capitalism took over in the 1990s.

== History ==
=== Medieval period ===
Albanians have an old tradition for law and regulations. Among the old laws is the Kanuni i Lek Dukagjinit, a sort of constitution respected by majority of Albanians throughout centuries. The Kanun of Lekë Dukagjini, which according to some writings was codified in the 14th century, is distinguished among several Kanuns. The Kanun has provided some level of self-government for the Albanians under foreign rule and thereby democracy has been exercised. According to the Kanun, important decisions are made by Conventions of the Elderly.

=== Modern period ===
During the National Renaissance of the 19th century, Albanians founded the League of Prizren and in the meantime a provisional government for the Albanian-speaking territories of the Ottoman Empire. The "New Kanun" was adopted as a program and statute for the governing bodies. This is often regarded as the beginning of the modern Albanian politics and diplomacy.

In 1913, the Principality of Albania was recognized as an independent country, yet the Great Powers decided to restrict Albania's territorial ambitions and imposed a constitutional monarchy to be headed by the German prince Wilhelm von Wied and his heirs in primogeniture. The Organic Statute of Albania (Albanian: Statuti Organik i Shqipërisë)—the constitution established by the International Control Commission in 1914—did not have much effect partially due to the rebellions against the foreign king and partially due to World War I.

The 1913 borders arranged by European powers left more than half of the Albanian-speaking territories outside Albania's borders. However, right after the First World War, the nation was in danger of being re-partitioned between other countries. In opposition to this, the Albanian leaders held Congress of Lushnjë at which they decided to defend the sovereignty of their country and fight against any foreign invasions. An interim constitution, officially known as Statute, sanctioning the monarchy was also passed.

During the 1920s, Albania experienced political instability and rapid succession of governments. In 1924 a revolutionary group took over by force, while six months later Ahmet Zogu crushed the revolution. In 1925, an Albanian Republic was declared under a constitution based mostly on the model of the Third French Republic. The Republic had a bicameral legislature (Chamber of Deputies and Senate) that elected a President, who was head of state and of government (Council of Ministers) for a seven-year term. The constitution departed from the then-French model, however, in the sweeping powers vested in the presidency. The President, among other things, had the right to appoint one-third of the Senate and rule by decree. The only president under this system was Zogu; for all intents and purposes, his presidency was a legal dictatorship.

Three years later, in 1928, Albania was proclaimed a kingdom, and President Zogu became King Zog I. The legislative organ consisted of one chamber, while the executive power belonged to the head of state, the King, and the cabinet composed of the Prime Minister and other ministers. In practice, however, Zog retained the same dictatorial powers he'd held as president, and the country was still essentially a military dictatorship.

With the Italian fascists invading Albania in 1939, this Constitution was abolished. Fascist collaborators in Albania offered the throne to Victor Emmanuel III, King of Italy, an act that heavily violated the Constitution of the Albanian Kingdom. The Quisling government established by the Italians passed a new Constitution in 1939.

=== Communist period ===
After the liberation of Albania from Nazi occupation, the communists established the Democratic Government of Albania. On 11 January 1946, the constitution of the People's Republic of Albania was promulgated, to which amendments were adopted in 1950. It was later replaced on 28 December 1976, by the Constitution of the People's Socialist Republic of Albania.

The 1976 Constitution defined Albania as a "Socialist People's Republic" (Art. 1) and a "state of the proletarian dictatorship" (Art. 2), and in a similar manner to its predecessor entrenched the rule of the Party of Labour of Albania as the leading force in the Albanian society and "the vanguard of the working class" (Art. 3). In socialist concepts, the Constitution guaranteed basic human rights and privileges to the citizen, such as tax exemption (1976 Constitution, Art. 31). State organs, the People's Assembly as the legislative organ, the Presidium of the People's Assembly as a de facto collegial head of state, and the Council of Ministers as the executive branch were described to function in a similar way as in a parliamentary democracy. However, the actions of these organs were subject to the guidance and decisions of the Labor Party, while its organization was not defined by the Constitution. The First Secretary of the Party was Commander-in-Chief of the Armed Forces and Chairmen of the Defense Council (Art. 89).

=== Present-day ===
The 1976 Constitution remained in effect until September 5, 1991, when a temporary basic law was passed to legalize a pluralist system and re-establish a capitalist economy in Albania. Based on this document, which defined Albania as a parliamentary republic, the new Constitution was drafted in 1998. Many drafts, such as the one proposed in 1994, failed to be ratified. The current Constitution was ratified by a popular referendum in 1998.

== Contents ==
| Part | Topic | Description |
|---|---|---|
| I | Basic Principles | Part I of the Constitution defines Albania as a unitary parliamentary republic as well as a secular state, in which elections are free, equal and periodic. |
| II | Fundamental Human Rights and Freedoms | The fundamental human rights and freedoms are indivisible, inalienable, and inviolable and stand at the base of the entire juridical order. |
| III | The Assembly | Election and Term; Deputies; Organization and Functioning; Legislative Process; Council of the Assembly |
| IV | The President of the Republic | |
| V | The Council of Ministers | |
| VI | Local Government | |
| VII | Normative Acts and International Agreements | Normative Acts; International Agreements |
| VIII | Constitutional Court | Courts; High Council |
| IX | The Courts | |
| X | Prosecution | |
| XI | Referendum | |
| XII | ~~Repealed~~ | Repealed by Law No. 9904 § (21.4.2008), Articles 153 and 154. |
| XIII | Public Finances | |
| XIV | State Supreme Audit | |
| XV | Armed Forces | |
| XVI | Extraordinary Measures | |
| XVII | Revision of the Constitution | |
| XVIII | Transitory and Final Provisions | |

== List of constitutions ==
| No. | Constitution | Enacted |
|---|---|---|
| 1 | Organic Statute of Albania | 10 April 1914 |
| 2 | Canonical Basis of the High Council | 31 January 1920 |
| 3 | Expanded Canonical Basis of the High Council | 14 December 1922 |
| 4 | Fundamental Statute of the Albanian Republic | 2 March 1925 |
| 5 | Fundamental Statute of the Albanian Kingdom | 1 December 1928 |
| 6 | Fundamental Statute of the Kingdom of Albania | 3 June 1939 |
| 7 | Statute of the People's Republic of Albania → Changes made to the constitution (5 July 1950) | 14 March 1946 |
| 8 | Constitution of the People's Socialist Republic of Albania → Law on the main constitutional provisions (29 April 1991) | 28 December 1976 |
| 9 | Constitution of the Republic of Albania | 28 November 1998 |
