= Part 17 =

Part Seventeen, Part 17 or Part XVII may refer to:

== Television ==
- "Part 17" (Twin Peaks), an episode of Twin Peaks
- "Part Seventeen" (Your Honor), an episode of Your Honor

== Other uses ==
- Part XVII of the Albanian Constitution
- Part XVII of the Constitution of India
- MPEG-4 Part 17
