= Part 11 =

Part Eleven, Part 11 or Part XI may refer to:

== Television ==
- "Part 11" (Twin Peaks), an episode of Twin Peaks
- "Part Eleven" (Your Honor), an episode of Your Honor

== Other uses ==
- Part XI of the Albanian Constitution
- Part XI of the Constitution of India
- Title 21 CFR Part 11
- MPEG-4 Part 11
