= Part I of the Albanian Constitution =

Part One (Part I) is a compilation of laws pertaining to the Constitution of Albania (Albanian: Kushtetuta e Shqipërisë), that consists of fourteen articles. This part of the Constitution is the first of eighteen parts.

Part I of the Constitution defines Albania as a unitary parliamentary republic as well as a secular state, in which elections are free, equal and periodic. As of the Constitution, the Republic of Albania is obligatory to protect the rights of the Albanian people in the country and abroad. Article 15 of Part I states the official language of the country is the Albanian language.

== Basic Principles ==
— Article 1 —

1. Albania is a parliamentary republic.
2. The Republic of Albania is a unitary and indivisible state.
3. Governance is based on a system of elections that are free, equal, general and periodic.

— Article 2 —

1. Sovereignty in the Republic of Albania belongs to the people.
2. The people exercise sovereignty through their representatives or directly.
3. For the maintenance of peace and national interests, the Republic of Albania may take part in a system of collective security, on the basis of a law approved by a majority of all the members of the Assembly.

— Article 3 —

The independence of the state and the integrity of its territory, dignity of the individual, human rights and freedoms, social justice, constitutional order, pluralism, national identity and inheritance, religious coexistence, as well as coexistence with, and understanding of Albanians for, minorities are the bases of this state, which has the duty of respecting and protecting them.

— Article 4 —

1. The law constitutes the basis and the boundaries of the activity of the state.
2. The Constitution is the highest law in the Republic of Albania.
3. The provisions of the Constitution are directly applicable, except when the Constitution provides otherwise.

— Article 5 —

The Republic of Albania applies international law that is binding upon it.

— Article 6 —

The organization and functioning of the bodies contemplated by this Constitution are regulated by their respective laws, except when this Constitution provides otherwise.

— Article 6/1 —

The election or appointment to or exercise of a public function in one of the organs provided in this Constitution or established by law, notwithstanding the regulation contained in other provisions of this Constitution, shall be prohibited, in case circumstances are established impairing the integrity of the public functionary, under the conditions and rules provided for by law being approved by three fifth of all members of the Assembly.

— Article 7 —

The system of government in the Republic of Albania is based on the separation and balancing of legislative, executive and judicial powers.

— Article 8 —

1. The Republic of Albania protects the national rights of the Albanian people who live outside its borders.
2. The Republic of Albania protects the rights of its citizens with a temporary or permanent residence outside its borders.
3. The Republic of Albania assures assistance for Albanians who live and work abroad in order to preserve and develop their ties with the national cultural inheritance.

— Article 9 —

1. Political parties are created freely. Their organization shall conform to democratic principles.
2. Political parties and other organizations, whose programs and activity are based on totalitarian methods, that incite and support racial, religious, regional or ethnic hatred, that use violence to take power or influence state policies, as well as those with a secret character, are prohibited pursuant to the law.
3. The financial sources of parties as well as their expenses are always made public.

— Article 10 —

1. In the Republic of Albania there is no official religion.
2. The state is neutral in questions of belief and conscience, and also, it guarantees the freedom of their expression in public life.
3. The state recognizes the equality of religious communities.
4. The state and the religious communities mutually respect the independence of one another and work together for the good of each of them and for all.
5. Relations between the state and religious communities are regulated on the basis of agreements achieved between their representatives and the Council of Ministers. These agreements are ratified by the Assembly.
6. Religious communities are legal entities. They have independence in the administration of their properties according to their principles, rules and canons, to the extent that interests of third parties are not infringed.

— Article 11 —

1. The economic system of the Republic of Albania is based on private and public property, as well as on a market economy and on freedom of economic activity.
2. Private and public property are equally protected by law.
3. Limitations on the freedom of economic activity may be established only by law and for important public reasons.

— Article 12 —

1. The armed forces secure the independence of the country, as well as protect its territorial integrity and constitutional order.
2. The armed forces maintain neutrality in political questions and are subject to civilian control.

— Article 13 —

Local government in the Republic of Albania is founded upon the basis of the principle of decentralization of power and is exercised according to the principle of local autonomy.

— Article 14 —

1. The official language in the Republic of Albania is Albanian.
2. The national flag is red with a two-headed black eagle in the centre.
3. The seal of the Republic of Albania presents a red shield with a black, two-headed eagle in the centre. At the top of the shield, in gold colour, is the helmet of Skanderbeg.
4. The national anthem is "United Around Our Flag."
5. The National Holiday of the Republic of Albania is the Flag Day, November 28.
6. The capital city of the Republic of Albania is Tirana.
7. The form and dimensions of the national symbols, the content of the text of the national anthem, and their use shall be regulated by law.

== See also ==
- Politics of Albania
