= Eco Tycoon: Project Green =

2009 video game

- Developer: Virtual Playground
- Publisher: ValuSoft
- Platform: Windows
- Release: NA: April 2009
- Genres: Strategy, simulation
- Mode: Single-player

Eco Tycoon: Project Green is a business simulation game which focuses on managing various environmental concerns while maintaining the region's economy. It was developed by Virtual Playground and published by ValuSoft in 2009.

== Gameplay ==
Each game begins in the year 2010, and the player has 50 years to reduce their carbon dioxide emissions as agreed upon at "World Summits", which take place every five years beginning in 2015. The world summits also determine how aid is distributed to promote emission reductions. The player starts with a region containing only cities in which he constructs such buildings as mines, power plants, and businesses. There is a finite number of locations in which buildings can be placed, requiring careful planning. Along with reducing emissions, the player must also balance the production and consumption of electricity, water, food and garbage while sustaining the economy.

Late-game in Europe.

There are seven playable regions in-game: North America, South America, Europe, Africa, North Asia, South Asia and Australasia. Each region has a different balance of resource availability, demand, and population growth. The other six regions are controlled by computer players, each having the same goal as the human player. There is no competition between regions, though resources can be traded and money transferred.

Money can be spent to research new technologies that reduce resource consumption and pollution, including solar power, recycling centers and organic farms.

Periodically, disasters occur, either in the player's own region or another, which require a decision as to whether financial aid should be sent.

== See also ==
- Global climate change
- Sustainability
- EcoGeek
