= Part XIV of the Albanian Constitution =

Part Fourteen (Part XIV) of the Constitution of Albania is the fourteenth of eighteen parts. Titled The State Supreme Audit, it consists of 4 articles sanctioning the function and duties of the State Supreme Audit.

== Public Finances ==
— Article 162 —

1. The State Supreme Audit is the highest institution of economic and financial control. It is subject only to the Constitution and laws.
2. The Head of the State Supreme Audit is appointed and dismissed by the Assembly upon proposal of the President of the Republic. He stays in office for 7 years, with the right of reelection.

— Article 163 —

The State Supreme Audit supervises:

a) the economic activity of state institutions and other state legal entities;
b) the use and preservation of state funds by the bodies of central and local government;
c) the economic activity of legal entities, in which the state owns more than half of the quotas or shares, or when their debts, credits and obligations are guaranteed by the state.

— Article 164 —

1. The State Supreme Audit presents to the Assembly:

a) a report on the implementation of the state budget;
b) its opinion on the Council of Ministers’ report about the expenses of the previous financial year before it is approved by the Assembly;
c) information about the results of audits any time it is asked by the Assembly.

2. The State Supreme Audit presents to the Assembly a yearly report on its activities.

— Article 165 —

1. The Head of the State Supreme Audit may be invited to participate and speak in the meetings of the Council of Ministers when questions related to its functions are reviewed.
2. The Head of the State Supreme Audit has the immunity of a member of the High Court.
