= Virtual Playground =

British software company

- Company type: Public
- Industry: Video games
- Genre: Business Management Games
- Founded: 13 November 2002
- Headquarters: Newcastle upon Tyne, England
- Subsidiaries: Microvalue group
- Website: http://virtual-playground.co.uk

Virtual Playground was a software company producing many tycoon or business simulation games primarily for the PC platform, but their works do also extend to the Nintendo DS. Their works include Prison Tycoon, Homeland Defense, Beer tycoon, Eco Tycoon: Project Green, and Mall Tycoon 2.

Their games are published by Take 2 Interactive, Koch Media, Global Star Software and ValuSoft and are typically based on the Gamebryo Game Engine. Since late 2018, many games published by Virtual Playground were removed from Nintendo eShop.
