= Mustafa Kërçuku =

Albanian auditor general

The 31st Auditor General of Albania
- In office 22 September 1997 – 28 October 2004
- Preceded by: Blerim Çela
- Succeeded by: Robert Çeku

Personal details
- Born: Kavajë, Albania

Mustafa Kërçuku (born in Kavajë) served as Albania's Auditor General from 1997–2004. He was elected to his post as a candidate from the National Front party.
