= Part XVIII of the Albanian Constitution =

Part of the Albanian Constitution

Part Eighteen (Part XVIII) of the Constitution of Albania is the last of eighteen parts. Titled Transitory and Final Dispositions, it consists of 8 articles.

== Transitory and Final Dispositions ==
— Article 178 —

1. Laws and other normative acts approved before the date this Constitution enters into force will be applied as long as they have not been abrogated.
2. The Council of Ministers presents to the Assembly draft laws necessary for implementing this Constitution.

— Article 179 —

1. Members of the Constitutional Court shall continue their activity as members of the Constitutional Court, in accordance with the previous mandate.
2. The first member to be replaced in the Constitutional Court shall be appointed by the President of the Republic, the second shall be elected by the Assembly and the third shall be appointed by the High Court. This shall be the order for all future appointments after the entry into force of this law.
3. Aiming at the regular renewal of the Constitutional Court, the new judge who shall succeed the judge whose mandate will end in 2017 shall remain in office until 2025 and the new judge who will succeed the judge whose mandate will end in 2020 shall remain in office until 2028. The other Constitutional Court judges shall be appointed for the entire duration of the mandate in accordance with the law.
4. Members of the High Court shall continue their activities in accordance with the previous mandate. The new members due to replace the members whose mandate expires, shall be appointed under the provisions of this law.
5. The High Judicial Council shall be established within 8 months from the entry into force of this law. Three judge members and two lay members of the High Judicial Council shall be appointed initially for a 3-year term, with the purpose of partial renewal of this body. The members of the High Council of Justice shall end their mandate after the establishment of the High Judicial Council, but not later than after all members of the High Judicial Council are elected as determined by law. For the first appointment of the lay members of the High Judicial Council that shall be made after the entry into force of this law, the verification of the candidates as provided in article 147 of the Constitution shall be conducted by the General Secretary of the Assembly and the International Monitoring Operation.
6. The High Prosecutorial Council shall be established within 8 months from the entry into force of this law. Three prosecutor members and two lay members of the High Prosecutorial Council shall be appointed initially for a 3-years term, with the purpose of partial renewal of this body. For the first appointment of the lay members of the High Prosecutorial Council that shall be made after the entry into force of this law, the verification of the candidates as provided in article 149 of the Constitution shall be conducted by the General Secretary of the Assembly and the International Monitoring Operation.
7. During their 9 year mandate, the judges of the Appeal Chamber under Article 179/b shall have disciplinary jurisdiction over all Constitutional Court judges, the members of High Judicial Council, the High Prosecutorial Council, the Prosecutor General, and the High Justice Inspector. The Appeal Chamber shall also have jurisdiction on the appeals against decisions of the High Judicial Council, High Prosecutorial Council as well as High Justice Inspector, imposing disciplinary sanctions respectively against judges, prosecutors and other inspectors.
8. The Serious Crimes Court of First Instance and the Serious Crimes Court of Appeal shall assume the name, function and competence of the first instance court and appeals court within 2 months of the establishment of the High Judicial Council, in accordance with the law. The transfer of cases shall be done in accordance with the law. The incumbent judges of these courts shall be transferred to other courts, if they or their close family members refuse to agree to the periodic reviews of their financial accounts and personal telecommunication. The prosecutors attached to the Special Prosecution Office shall be appointed within 2 months of the establishment of the High Prosecutorial Council. The Serious Crimes Prosecution Office shall cease to exist. The transfer of cases under investigation and adjudication shall be done in accordance with the law.
9. The High Justice Inspector shall be appointed within 6 months after the entry into force of this law. The manner of functioning of the existing inspectorates during the transition period shall be regulated by law.
10. Judges and prosecutors who have not finished the School of Magistrate shall hold their office and shall be subject to the process of transitional re-evaluation of the qualification of judges and prosecutors under Article 179/b and the Annex to this law.
11. Within 5 days of the entry into force of this law, the President of the Republic shall elect by lot the members of the Justice Appointments Council in accordance with Article 149/d paragraph 3 of the Constitution. If the President of the Republic fails to select the members within 5 days of the entry into force of this law, the Speaker of the Assembly shall select them by lot within 10 days of the entry into force of this law. Those selected shall hold office until December 31 of the year that this law enters into force. The People’s Advocate shall participate as an observer in the selection by lot, as well as in the meetings and operations of the Justice Appointments Council. The members of the Justice Appointments Council shall be as soon as possible subject to the transitional re-evaluation of the qualification of judges and prosecutors under Article 179/b of this law.
12. The President of the Republic shall remain as Chairperson of the High Council of Justice until the High Judicial Council is established within 8 months from the entry into force of this law. Upon the establishment of the High Judicial Council, the President shall appoint the judges of the High Court in accordance with Article 136 of the Constitution. The President of the Republic shall fill in the first vacancy in the Constitutional Court under paragraph 2 of this Article and Article 125 of the Constitution.
13. Until the Parliamentary elections, which will be held after the entry into force of this law, but not later than 1 September 2017, the election of the High Justice Inspector and the Prosecutor General, shall be made by 2/3 of the members of the Assembly. Other elections shall be made by 3/5 of the members of the Assembly.

— Article 179/a —

1. The mandate of the functionaries being elected or appointed to the constitutional bodies or bodies established by law, being obtained prior to the entry of this law into effect shall end or become invalid, upon the elected or appointed person falling under the circle of persons being exempted from the right to the elected, under Articles 6/1 and 45, point 3, of the Constitution.
2. The Assembly shall, under procedure of Article 81, point 2, of the constitution, within 30 days since the entry of this law into effect, approve the law setting out the conditions and rules for guaranteeing the integrity of the bodies being elected, appointed or assuming public functions.”

— Article 179/b —

1. The re-evaluation system shall be established in order to guarantee the proper functioning of the rule of law, the independence of the judicial system, as well as to re-establish the public trust and confidence in these institutions. 2. The re-evaluation shall be carried out on the basis of the principles of the fair trial and conducted by respecting the fundamental rights of the assessee.
3. All judges, including judges of the Constitutional Court and High Court, all prosecutors, including the Prosecutor General, the Chief Inspector and the other inspectors of the High Council of Justice shall ex officio be re-evaluated.
4. All legal advisors of the Constitutional Court and High Court, legal assistants of the administrative courts, legal assistants of the General Prosecution Office shall ex officio be re-evaluated. Former judges or prosecutors, and former legal advisors of the Constitutional Court and High Court with at least three years of work experience in this function may undergo upon their request the re-evaluation process, if they fulfil the criteria regulated by law.
5. The re-evaluation shall be conducted by an Independent Qualification Commission, while the appeals filed by the assessees or the Public Commissioners shall be considered by the Appeal Chamber attached to the Constitutional Court. During the transition period of 9 years, the Constitutional Court shall consist of two chambers.
6. The Commission and the Appeal Chamber shall be independent and impartial.
7. Failure to successfully pass the re-evaluation process constitutes a ground for the immediate termination of the exercise of functions, in addition to the grounds provided for in the Constitution. Judges and prosecutors including those seconded in other positions, former judges or former prosecutors, who successfully pass the re-evaluation, shall hold the office or will be appointed judges and prosecutors. All other assessees, who successfully pass the reevaluation shall be appointed as judges or prosecutors under the law.
8. The mandate of the members of the Independent Qualification Commission and the Public Commissioner shall expire after five years from the date of commencement of their operation, while the mandate of the judges of the Appeal Chamber is nine years. After the dissolution of the Commission, pending re-evaluation cases shall be conducted by the High Judicial Council in accordance with the law. Pending re-evaluation cases of the prosecutors shall be conducted by the High Prosecutorial Council in accordance with the law. After the dissolution of the Public Commissioners, their competences shall be exercised by the Chief Special Prosecutor of the Special Prosecution Office. Any appeals against pending decisions of the Commission shall be considered by the Constitutional Court.
9. The Assembly shall decide on repealing this Annex after the last reevaluation decision becomes final, following a report submitted by the Chairperson of the Appeal Chamber on the state of affairs of the pending cases or at the end of the mandate of the Special Qualification Chamber.
10. Re-evaluation procedures and criteria shall be regulated in compliance with the provisions of the Annex and the law.

— Article 180 —

1. International agreements ratified by the Republic of Albania before this Constitution enters into force are considered ratified according to this Constitution.
2. The Council of Ministers presents to the Constitutional Court the international agreements which contain provisions that come in conflict with the Constitution.

— Article 181 —

1. The Assembly, within two to three years from the date this Constitution enters into force, issues laws for the fair resolution of different issues related to expropriations and confiscations done before the approval of this Constitution, guided by the criteria of Article 41.
2. Laws and other normative acts, adopted before the date this Constitution enters into force, that relate to the expropriations and confiscations shall be applied when they do not come in conflict with it

— Article 182 —

Law No. 7491, dated 29.4. 1991, "On the Main Constitutional Provisions" as well as the other constitutional laws are abrogated the day this Constitution enters into force.

— Article 183 —

This Constitution enters into force with its promulgation by the President of the Republic.
