= Part II of the Albanian Constitution =

Part Two (Part II) of the Constitution of Albania is the second of eighteen parts. Titled The Fundamental Human Rights and Freedoms, it is divided into 6 chapters that consist of 49 articles.

== The Fundamental Human Rights and Principles ==
Chapter I: General Principles

— Article 15 —

1. The fundamental human rights and freedoms are indivisible, inalienable, and inviolable and stand at the basis of the entire juridical order.
2. The organs of public power, in fulfillment of their duties, shall respect the fundamental rights and freedoms, as well as contribute to their realization.

— Article 16 —

1. The fundamental rights and freedoms and the duties contemplated in this Constitution for Albanian citizens are also valid for foreigners and stateless persons in the territory of the Republic of Albania, except for cases when the Constitution specifically attaches the exercise of particular rights and freedoms with Albanian citizenship.
2. The fundamental rights and freedoms and the duties contemplated in this Constitution are valid also for juridical persons so long as they comport with the general purposes of these persons and with the core of these rights, freedoms and duties.

— Article 17 —

1. The limitation of the rights and freedoms provided for in this Constitution may be established only by law for a public interest or for the protection of the rights of others. A limitation shall be in proportion with the situation that has dictated it.
2. These limitations may not infringe the essence of the rights and freedoms and in no case may exceed the limitations provided for in the European Convention on Human Rights.

— Article 18 —

1. All are equal before the law.
2. No one may be unjustly discriminated against for reasons such as gender, race, religion, ethnicity, language, political, religious or philosophical beliefs, economic condition, education, social status, or ancestry.
3. No one may be discriminated against for reasons mentioned in paragraph 2 if reasonable and objective legal grounds do not exist.

— Article 19 —

1. Everyone born of at least one parent with Albanian citizenship gains automatically Albanian citizenship. Albanian citizenship is gained also for other reasons provided by law.
2. An Albanian citizen may not lose his citizenship, except when he gives it up.

— Article 20 —

1. Persons who belong to national minorities exercise in full equality before the law the human rights and freedoms.
2. They have the right to freely express, without prohibition or compulsion, their ethnic, cultural, religious and linguistic belonging. They have the right to preserve and develop it, to study and to be taught in their mother tongue, as well as unite in organizations and societies for the protection of their interests and identity.

Chapter II: Personal Rights and Freedoms

— Article 21 —

The life of a person is protected by law.

— Article 22 —

1. Freedom of expression is guaranteed.
2. The freedom of the press, radio and television are guaranteed.
3. Prior censorship of a means of communication is prohibited.
4. The law may require the granting of authorization for the operation of radio or television stations.

— Article 23 —

1. The right to information is guaranteed.
2. Everyone has the right, in compliance with law, to get information about the activity of state organs, as well as of persons who exercise state functions.
3. Everybody is given the possibility to follow the meetings of collectively elected organs.

— Article 24 —

1. Freedom of conscience and of religion is guaranteed.
2. Everyone is free to choose or to change his religion or beliefs, as well as to express them individually or collectively, in public or private life, through cult, education, practices or the performance of rituals.
3. No one may be compelled or prohibited to take part or not in a religious community or in religious practices or to make his beliefs or faith public.

— Article 25 —

No one may be subjected to cruel, inhuman or degrading torture, punishment or treatment.

— Article 26 —

No one may be required to perform forced labor, except in cases of the execution of a judicial decision, the performance of military service, or for a service that results from a state of emergency, war or natural disaster that threatens human life or health.

— Article 27 —

1. No one's liberty may be taken away except in the cases and according to the procedures provided by law.
2. Freedom of a person may not be limited, except in the following cases:

a) when he is punished with imprisonment by a competent court;
b) for failure to comply with the lawful orders of the court or with an obligation set by law;
c) when there are reasonable suspicions that he has committed a criminal offense or to prevent the commission by him of a criminal offense or his escape after its commission;
d) for the supervision of a minor for purposes of education or for escorting him to a competent organ;
e) when a person is the carrier of a contagious disease, mentally incompetent and dangerous to society;
f) for illegal entry at state borders or in cases of deportation or extradition.

3. No one may be deprived of liberty just because he is not in a condition to fulfill a contractual obligation.

— Article 28 —

1. Everyone whose liberty has been taken away has the right to be notified immediately, in a language that he understands, of the reasons for this measure, as well as the accusation made against him. The person whose liberty has been taken away shall be informed that he has no obligation to make a declaration and has the right to communicate immediately with a lawyer, and he shall also be given the possibility to realize his rights.
2. The person whose liberty has been taken away, according to article 27, paragraph 2, subparagraph c), must be sent within 48 hours before a judge, who shall decide upon his pre-trial detention or release not later than 48 hours from the moment he receives the documents for review.
3. A person in pre-trial detention has the right to appeal the judge's decision. He has the right to be tried within a reasonable period of time or to be released on bail pursuant to law.
4. In all other cases, the person whose liberty is taken away extra-judicially may address a judge at anytime, who shall decide within 48 hours regarding the legality of this action.
5. Every person whose liberty was taken away pursuant to article 27, has the right to humane treatment and respect for his dignity.

— Article 29 —

1. No one may be accused or declared guilty of a criminal act that was not considered as such by law at the time of its commission, with the exception of cases, which at the time of their commission, according to international law, constitute war crimes or crimes against humanity.
2. No punishment may be given that is more severe than that which was contemplated by law at the time of commission of the criminal act.
3. A favorable criminal law has retroactive effect.

— Article 30 —

Everyone is considered innocent so long as his guilt is not proven by a final judicial decision.

— Article 31 —

During a criminal proceeding, everyone has the right:

a) to be notified immediately and in detail of the accusation made against him, of his rights, as well as to have the possibility created to notify his family or those close to him;
b) to have the time and sufficient facilities to prepare his defense;
c) to have the assistance without payment of a translator, when he does not speak or understand the Albanian language;
d) to be defended by himself or with the assistance of a legal defender chosen by him; to communicate freely and privately with him, as well as to be assured of free defense when he does not have sufficient means;
e) to question witnesses who are present and to seek the presentation of witnesses, experts and other persons who can clarify the facts.

— Article 32 —

1. No one may be obliged to testify against himself or his family or to confess his guilt.
2. No one may be declared guilty on the basis of data collected in an unlawful manner.

— Article 33 —

1. No one may be denied the right to be heard before being judged.
2. A person who is hiding from justice may not take advantage of this right.

— Article 34 —

No one may be punished more than one time for the same criminal act nor be tried again, except for cases when the re-adjudication of the case is decided on by a higher court, in the manner specified by law.

— Article 35 —

1. No one may be obliged, except when the law requires it, to make public data connected with his person.
2. The collection, use and making public of data about a person is done with his consent, except for the cases provided by law.
3. Everyone has the right to become acquainted with data collected about him, except for the cases provided by law.
4. Everyone has the right to request the correction or expunging of untrue or incomplete data or data collected in violation of law.

— Article 36 —

The freedom and secrecy of correspondence or any other means of communication are guaranteed.

— Article 37 —

1. The inviolability of the residence is guaranteed.
2. Searches of a residence, as well as the premises that are equivalent to it, may be done only in the cases and manner provided by law.
3. No one may be subjected to a personal search outside a criminal proceeding, with the exception of the cases of entry into the territory of the state and the leaving of it, or to avoid a risk that threatens public security.

— Article 38 —

1. Everyone has the right to choose his place of residence and to move freely to any part of the territory of the state.
2. No one may be hindered to go freely out of the state.

— Article 39 —

1. No Albanian citizen may be expelled from the territory of the state.
2. Extradition may be permitted only when it is expressly provided in international agreements, to which the Republic of Albania is a party, and only by judicial decision.
3. The collective expulsion of foreigners is prohibited. The expulsion of individuals is permitted under the conditions specified by law.

— Article 40 —

Foreigners have the right of refuge in the Republic of Albania according to law.

— Article 41 —

1. The right of private property is guaranteed.
2. Property may be gained by gift, inheritance, purchase, or any other classical means provided by the Civil Code.
3. The law may provide for expropriations or limitations in the exercise of a property right only for public interests.
4. The expropriations or limitations of a property right that are equivalent to expropriation are permitted only against fair compensation.
5. For disagreements connected with the extent of the compensation, a complaint may be filed in court.

— Article 42 —

1. The freedom, property, and rights recognized in the Constitution and by law may not be infringed without due process.
2. Everyone, to protect his constitutional and legal rights, freedoms, and interests, or in the case of an accusation raised against him, has the right to a fair and public trial, within a reasonable time, by an independent and impartial court specified by law.

— Article 43 —

Anyone shall be entitled to file an appeal against a judicial decision before a higher court, except if otherwise provided in the law for criminal offences of a minor character, for civil and administrative matters of minor importance or value, according to the conditions provided in articles 17 of the Constitution.

— Article 44 —

Everyone has the right to be rehabilitated and/or indemnified in compliance with law if he is damaged because of an unlawful act, action or failure to act of the state organs.

Chapter III: Political Rights and Freedoms

— Article 45 —

1. Every citizen who has attained the age of 18, even on the date of the elections, has the right to elect and be elected.
2. Citizens who have been declared mentally incompetent by a final court decision are excluded from the right of election.
3. Exempted from the right to be elected shall be the citizens being sentenced to imprisonment upon a formally and substantially final decision, in connection with the commission of a crime, under the rules set out in a law being approved by three fifth of all the members of the Parliament. In exceptional and justified cases, the law may provide for restrictions of the election right for citizens serving an imprisonment sentence or the right to be elected prior to a final decision being rendered, or the citizens having been deported in connection with a crime or very serious and grave breach of public security
4. The vote is personal, equal, free and secret

— Article 46 —

1. Everyone has the right to organize collectively for any lawful purpose.
2. The registration of organizations or societies in court is done according to the procedure provided by law.
3. Organizations or societies that pursue unconstitutional purposes are prohibited pursuant to law.

— Article 47 —

1. Freedom of peaceful meetings and without arms, as well the participation in them is guaranteed.
2. Peaceful meetings in squares and places of public passage are held in conformity with the law.

— Article 48 —

Everyone, by himself or together with others, may direct requests, complaints or comments to the public organs, which are obliged to answer in the time periods and conditions set by law.

Chapter IV: Economic, Social and Cultural Rights and Freedoms

— Article 49 —

1. Everyone has the right to earn the means of living by lawful work that he has chosen or accepted himself. He is free to choose his profession, place of work, as well as his own system of professional qualification.
2. Employees have the right to social protection of work.

— Article 50 —

Employees have the right to unite freely in labor organizations for the defense of their work interests.

— Article 51 —

1. The right of an employee to strike in connection with work relations is guaranteed.
2. Limitations on particular categories of employees may be established by law to assure essential social services.

— Article 52 —

1. Everyone has the right to social security in old age or when he is unable to work, according to a system set by law.
2. Everyone, who remains without work for reasons independent of their volition, and has no other means of support, has the right to assistance under the conditions provided by law.

— Article 53 —

1. Everyone has the right to get married and have a family.
2. Marriage and family enjoy special protection of the state.
3. The entering into and dissolution of marriage are regulated by law.

— Article 54 —

1. Children, the young, pregnant women and new mothers have the right to special protection by the state.
2. Children born out of wedlock have equal rights with those born within marriage.
3. Every child has the right to be protected from violence, ill treatment, exploitation and their use for work, especially under the minimum age for work, which could damage their health and morals or endanger their life or normal development.

— Article 55 —

1. Citizens enjoy in an equal manner the right to health care from the state.
2. Everyone has the right to health insurance pursuant to the procedure provided by law.

— Article 56 —

Everyone has the right to be informed for the status of the environment and its protection.

— Article 57 —

1. Everyone has the right to education.
2. Mandatory school education is determined by law.
3. General high school public education is open for all.
4. Professional high school education and higher education can be conditioned only on criteria of abilities.
5. Mandatory education and general high school education in public schools are free.
6. Pupils and students may also be educated in private schools of all levels, which are created and operated on the basis of law.
7. The autonomy and academic freedom of higher education institutions are guaranteed by law.

— Article 58 —

1. Freedom of artistic creation and scientific research, placing in use, as well as profit from their results are guaranteed for all.
2. Copyright is protected by law.

Chapter V: Social Objectives

— Article 59 —

1. The state, within its constitutional powers and the means at its disposal, aims to supplement private initiative and responsibility with:

a) employment under suitable conditions for all persons who are able to work;
b) fulfillment of the housing needs of its citizens;
c) the highest possible standard of health, physical and mental;
d) education and qualification according to ability of children and the young, as well as unemployed persons;
e) a healthy and ecologically adequate environment for the present and future generations;
f) rational exploitation of forests, waters, pastures and other natural resources on the basis of the principle of sustainable development;
g) care and help for the aged, orphans and persons with disabilities;
h) development of sport and of recreation activities;
i) health rehabilitation, specialized education and integration in society of disabled people, as well as continual improvement of their living conditions;
j) protection of national cultural heritage and particular care for the Albanian language.

2. Fulfillment of social objectives may not be claimed directly in court. The law defines the conditions and extent to which the realization of these objectives can be claimed.

Chapter VI: People's Advocate

— Article 60 —

1. The People's Advocate defends the rights, freedoms and lawful interests of individuals from unlawful or improper actions or failures to act of the organs of public administration.
2. The People's Advocate is independent in the exercise of his duties.
3. The People's Advocate has his own budget, which he administers himself. He proposes the budget pursuant to law.

— Article 61 —

1. The People's Advocate is elected by three-fifths of all members of the Assembly for a five-year period, with the right of reelection.
2. Any Albanian citizen with higher education, and with recognized knowledge and recognized activity in the field of human rights and law may be the People's Advocate.
3. The People's Advocate enjoys the immunity of a judge of the High Court.
4. The People's Advocate may not take part in any political party, carry on any other political, state or professional activity, nor take part in the management organs of social, economic and commercial organizations.

— Article 62 —

1. The People's Advocate may be discharged only on the reasoned complaint of not less than one-third of the deputies.
2. In this case, the Assembly makes a decision with three-fifths of all its members.

— Article 63 —

1. The People's Advocate presents an annual report before the Assembly.
2. The People's Advocate reports before the Assembly when it is requested of him, and he may request the Assembly to hear him on matters he determines important.
3. The People's Advocate has the right to make recommendations and to propose measures when he observes violations of human rights and freedoms by the public administration.
4. Public organs and officials are obligated to present to the People's Advocate all documents and information requested by him.
