= Part XV of the Albanian Constitution =

Part Fifteen (Part XV) of the Constitution of Albania is the fifteenth of eighteen parts. Titled Armed Forces, it consists of 4 articles sanctioning the function, duties and hierarchy of the Albanian Armed Forces.

== Armed Forces ==
— Article 166 —

1. The Albanian citizens have the duty to participate in the defense of the Republic of Albania, as provided by law.
2. The citizen, who for reasons of conscience refuses to serve with weapons in the armed forces, is obliged to perform an alternative service, as provided by law.

— Article 167 —

1. Military servicemen on active duty cannot be chosen or nominated for other state duties nor participate in a party or political activity.
2. Members of the armed forces or persons who perform an alternative service enjoy all the constitutional rights and freedoms, apart from cases when the law provides otherwise.

— Article 168 —

1. The Armed Forces of the Republic of Albania are composed of the army, navy, and air force.
2. The President of the Republic is the General Commander of the Armed Forces.
3. The National Security Council is an advisory body of the President of the Republic.

— Article 169 —

1. The President of the Republic in peacetime exercises the command of the Armed Forces through the Prime Minister and Minister of Defense.
2. The President of the Republic in wartime appoints and dismisses the Commander of the Armed Forces upon proposal of the Prime Minister.
3. The President of the Republic, upon proposal of the Prime Minister, appoints and dismisses the Chief of the General Staff, and upon the proposal of the Minister of Defense appoints and dismisses the commanders of the army, navy, and air force.
4. The powers of the President of the Republic, as General Commander of the Armed Forces, and those of the Commander of the Armed Forces, their subordination to constitutional organs, are defined by law.
