= Fundamental Statute of the Kingdom of Albania (1939) =

20th century Albanian Kingdom constitution

- Ratified: 3 June 1939
- Date effective: 4 June 1939
- Repealed: 15 March 1946
- Signatories: Victor Emmanuel III of Italy

The Fundamental Statute of the Kingdom of Albania was the constitution used in the Albanian Kingdom. It was introduced by King Victor Emmanuel III of Italy after the Italian invasion of Albania. It replaced the previous constitution of the same name. It was signed by Victor Emmanuel III on 3 June 1939 and then presented to Shefqet Vërlaci in Rome, and went into effect the following day.

The 1939 constitution proclaimed Victor Emmanuel III the King of Albania and made Albania a constitutional monarchy. It also created a "Supreme Fascist Corporation Council" to serve as the legislature of Albania, structured after Italy's Chamber of Fasces and Corporations.

The 1939 constitution was replaced on 15 March 1946, after Enver Hoxha promulgated a constitution for the newly formed People's Republic of Albania.

== Parts ==
- Preamble
- Chapter I - General Provisions
- Chapter II - The King
- Chapter III - The Government of the King
- Chapter IV - Superior Corporate Fascist Council
- Chapter V - Judicial Order
- Chapter VI - The Rights and Duties of Citizens

== See also ==
- List of constitutions of Albania
