= Part XII of the Albanian Constitution =

Part Twelve (Part XII) of the Constitution of Albania was the twelfth of eighteen parts. Titled Central Election Commission, it consisted of 2 articles and was repealed by the 2008 constitutional amendments. Since then Part Twelve stays unfulfilled in the constitution accompanied by the underlined text "repealed".
