= Part XVII of the Albanian Constitution =

Part Seventeen (Part XVII) of the Constitution of Albania is the seventeenth of eighteen parts. Titled Revision of the Constitution, it consists of 1 article and sanctions: how; by whom; in what way; and when constitutional changes are made.

== Revision of the Constitution ==
— Article 177 —

1. Initiative for revision of the Constitution may be undertaken by not less than one-fifth of the members of the Assembly.
2. No revision of the Constitution may be undertaken during the time when the extraordinary measures are taken.
3. The draft law is approved by not less than two-thirds of all members of the Assembly.
4. The Assembly may decide, with two-thirds of all its members that the draft constitutional amendments be voted in a referendum. The draft law for the revision of the Constitution enters into force after ratification by referendum, which takes place not later than 60 days after its approval in the Assembly.
5. The approved constitutional amendment is put to a referendum when this is required by one-fifth of the members of the Assembly.
6. The President of the Republic does not have the right to return for review the law approved by the Assembly for revision of the Constitution.
7. The law approved by referendum is declared by the President of the Republic and enters into force on the date provided for in this law.
8. Revision of the Constitution for the same issue cannot be done before a year from the day of the rejection of the draft law by the Assembly and 3 years from the day of its rejection by the referendum.
