= Part VII of the Albanian Constitution =

Part Seven (Part VII) of the Constitution of Albania is the seventh of eighteen parts. Titled Normative Acts and International Agreements, it is divided into 2 chapters that consist of 8 articles.

== The Assembly ==
Chapter I: Normative Acts

— Article 116 —

1. Normative acts that are effective in the entire territory of the Republic of Albania are:

a) the Constitution;
b) ratified international agreements;
c) the laws;
ç) normative acts of the Council of Ministers.

2. Acts that are issued by the bodies of local government are effective only within the territorial jurisdiction exercised by these bodies.
3. Normative acts of ministers and steering bodies of other central institutions of the state are effective in the entire territory of the Republic of Albania within the sphere of their jurisdiction

— Article 117 —

1. The laws, normative acts of the Council of Ministers, ministers, other central state institutions, acquire juridical force only after they are published in the Official Journal.
2. The promulgation and publication of other normative acts is done according to the manner provided by law.
3. International agreements that are ratified by law are promulgated and published according to the procedures that are provided for laws. The promulgation and publication of other international agreements is done according to law.

— Article 118 —

1. Sub-legal acts are issued on the basis of and for implementation of the laws by the bodies provided for in the Constitution.
2. A law must authorize the issuance of sub-legal acts, designate the competent body, the issues that are to be regulated, as well as the principles on the basis of which these sub-legal acts are issued.
3. The body authorized by law to issue sub-legal acts as specified in paragraph 2 of this article may not delegate its power to another body.

— Article 119 —

1. The rules of the Council of Ministers, of the ministries and other central state institutions, as well as orders of the Prime Minister, of the ministers and heads of other central institutions, have an internal character and are binding only on the administrative entities that are subordinated to these bodies.
2. These acts are issued on the basis of law and may not serve as a basis for taking decisions connected with individuals and other subjects.
3. The rules and orders are issued on the basis of, and for implementation of, acts that have general juridical force.

— Article 120 —

The principles and procedures for the issuance of local juridical acts are provided by law.

Chapter II: International Agreements

— Article 121 —

1. The ratification and denunciation of international agreements by the Republic of Albania is done by law if they have to do with:

a) territory, peace, alliances, political and military issues;
b) freedoms, human rights and obligations of citizens as are provided in the Constitution;
c) membership of the Republic of Albania in international organizations;
ç) the undertaking of financial obligations by the Republic of Albania;
d) the approval, amendment, supplementing or repeal of laws.

2. The Assembly may, with a majority of all its members, ratify other international agreements that are not provided for in paragraph 1 of this article.
3. The Prime Minister notifies the Assembly whenever the Council of Ministers signs an international agreement that is not ratified by law.
4. The principles and procedures for ratification and denunciation of international agreements are provided by law.

— Article 122 —

1. Any international agreement that has been ratified constitutes part of the internal juridical system after it is published in the Official Journal of the Republic of Albania. It is implemented directly, except for cases when it is not self-executing and its implementation requires issuance of a law. The amendment, supplementation and repeal of laws approved by the majority of all members of the Assembly, for the effect of ratifying an international agreement, is done with the same majority.
2. An international agreement that has been ratified by law has superiority over laws of the country that are not compatible with it.
3. The norms issued by an international organization have superiority, in case of conflict, on the laws of the country, when the agreement ratified by the Republic of Albania for its participation in this organization, expressly provide for the direct applicability of the norms issued by this organization.

— Article 123 —

1. The Republic of Albania, on the basis of international agreements, delegates to international organizations state powers for specific issues.
2. The law that ratifies an international agreement as provided for in paragraph 1 of this article is approved by a majority of all members of the Assembly.
3. The Assembly may decide that the ratification of such an agreement be done through a referendum.
