= 1998 Albanian constitutional referendum =

- 22 November 1998

Results
Choice	Votes	%
Yes	879,488	93.51%
No	61,000	6.49%
Valid votes	940,488	97.21%
Invalid or blank votes	27,000	2.79%
Total votes	967,488	100.00%
Registered voters/turnout	1,914,859	50.53%

A constitutional referendum was held in Albania on 22 November 1998. Voters were asked whether they approved of the constitution. It was approved by 93.5% of voters with a turnout of 50.6%, and came into force on 28 November.

== Background ==
In September 1997 a 21-member Constitutional Commission was formed by Parliament, including twelve members of the ruling Socialist Party and Social Democratic Party and nine members of the Democratic Party. The Commission was given a six-month timeframe for producing a draft.

The public were widely consulted during the process using surveys, forums and public meetings. Despite the Democratic Party boycotting the Commission until the latter stages of the process and a coup attempt by its leader Sali Berisha, the Commission produced its draft constitution on 4 August 1998 having obtained a six-month extension. After its publication further hearings and debates were held, resulting in around a quarter of the articles in the first draft being amended.

The second draft was then approved by Parliament on 21 October 1998 with 115 in favour and none against (the other 40 MPs, mostly Democratic Party members, did not attend the vote).

== Results ==
Choice	Votes	%
For	879,488	93.5
Against	61,000	6.5
Invalid blank votes	27,000	–
Total	968,346	100
Registered voters/turnout	1,914,859	50.6
Source: Nohlen & Stöver

Note that the data is inconsistent, possibly due to mistakes at polling stations not being corrected at higher levels.
