= PT-8 =

PT-8 or variant, may refer to:

- Sukhoi PT-8, a 1950s prototype Soviet fighter-aircraft
- Consolidated XPT-8 and XPT-8A, 1930s experimental training aircraft powered by Packard DR-980 diesel engines
- PT-8, a pre-World War II US Navy PT-boat.
- PT-8, a videocall standard used exclusively by the Nokia 6630
