= Part IV of the Albanian Constitution =

Part Four (Part IV) of the Constitution of Albania is the fourth of eighteen parts. Titled The President of the Republic, it consists of 9 articles.

== The President of the Republic ==
— Article 86 —

1. The President of the Republic is the Head of State and represents the unity of the people.
2. Only an Albanian citizen by birth who has been a resident in Albania for not less than the past 10 years and who has reached the age of 40 may be elected President.

— Article 87 —

1. The candidate for President is proposed to the Assembly by a group of not less than 20 MPs. One MP is not allowed to propose more than one candidate at the same time.
2. The President of the Republic is elected by secret vote and without debate by the Assembly. The Assembly conducts up to five voting rounds for the election of the President. The first voting takes place not later than seven days from the beginning of the procedure for the election of the President. Each of the other voting takes place not later than seven days from the unsuccessful completion of the preceding voting. A voting is deemed as completed even when no candidates are running in the competition. New candidates may run in the second, third and fourth voting, in accordance with the conditions of point 1 of this article.
3. The President is elected in the first, second or third voting when one candidate receives not less than three fifths of the votes of all the members of the Assembly. In the fourth and fifth voting, the candidate that receives more than half of the votes of all the members of the Assembly is elected President.
4. The fifth voting takes place when none of the candidates receive the required majority of votes in the fourth voting. The fifth voting takes place only between the two candidates who have received the highest number of votes in the fourth voting. If there are more than two candidates with the same number of votes, the candidate who will run in the voting shall be determined by lot. If, after the fourth voting, there are no candidates left to compete, new candidates may run in this voting in accordance with the conditions of point 1 of this article. If more than two candidates are proposed to run, the voting takes place between the two candidates that have ensured the highest number of the proposing MPs.
5. If, even after the fifth voting none of the candidates has received the required majority of votes, or if after the unsuccessful completion of the fourth voting no new candidates are proposed, the Assembly is dissolved. The new elections take place within 45 days from its dissolution.
6. The subsequent Assembly elects the President of the Republic by a majority of all its members.

— Article 88 —

1. The President of the Republic is in every case elected for 5 years, with the right of reelection only once.
2. The mandate expires on the same date of the same month of the fifth year from the date the President of the Republic takes his oath. The mandate of the President is extended only in case of war, and for as long as the war continues.

2/1. The procedure for the election of the President begins not later than 60 days before the termination of the preceding presidential mandate. When the presidential mandate ends during the six months preceding the end of the mandate of the existing Assembly, the procedure for the election of the President starts no later than 60 days prior to the ending of the mandate of the Assembly.

3. The President begins his duties after he takes the oath before the Assembly, but not before the mandate of the President who is leaving has been completed. The President swears as follows:

I swear that I will obey to the Constitution and laws of the country, that I will respect the rights and freedoms of citizens, protect the independence of the Republic, and I will serve the general interest and the progress of the Albanian People.
The President may add: So help me God!

4. A President who resigns before the end of his mandate cannot be a candidate in the presidential election that takes place after his resignation.

— Article 89 —

The President of the Republic cannot hold any other public post, cannot be a member of a party or carry out other private activity.

— Article 90 —

1. The President of the Republic is not held responsible for acts carried out in the exercise of his duty.
2. The President of the Republic may be discharged for serious violations of the Constitution and for the commission of a serious crime. In these cases, a proposal to discharge the President may be made by not less than one-fourth of the members of the Assembly and must be supported by not less than two-thirds of all its members.
3. The decision of the Assembly is sent to the Constitutional Court, which, when it proves the culpability of the President of the Republic, declares his discharge from duty.

— Article 91 —

1. When the President of the Republic is temporarily unable to exercise his functions or his post remains vacant, the Chairman of the Assembly takes his post and exercises his powers.
2. In case the President cannot exercise his duty for more than 60 days, the Assembly by twothirds of all its members decides on sending the issue to the Constitutional Court, which conclusively proves the fact of his incapacity. When the incapacity is proved, the post of the President remains vacant and the election of the new President begins within 10 days from the date the incapacity is proved.

— Article 92 —

The President also exercises these powers:

a) address messages to the Assembly;
b) exercise the right of pardon according to the law;
c) grant Albanian citizenship and permits it to be given up according to the law;
ç) gives decorations and titles of honour according to the law;
d) accord the highest military ranks according to the law;
dh) appoint and release plenipotentiary representatives of the Republic of Albania to other states and international organizations on the proposal of the Prime Minister;
e) accept letters of credentials and the withdrawal of diplomatic representatives of other states and international organizations accredited to the Republic of Albania;
ë) sign international agreements according to the law;
f), appoint the director of the State Intelligence Service upon proposal of the Prime Minister;
g) nominate the Chairman of the Academy of Sciences and the rectors of universities pursuant to law;
gj) set the date of the elections for the Assembly, local government bodies and the conduct of referendums;
h) request opinions and information in writing from the directors of State institutions for issues that have to do with their duties.

— Article 93 —

The President of the Republic, in the exercise of his powers, issues decrees.

— Article 94 —

The President of the Republic cannot exercise other powers besides those recognized expressly in the Constitution and granted by laws issued in compliance with it.
