= PT-7 =

PT-7 or variant, may refer to:

- Sukhoi PT-7, a 1950s experimental Soviet fighter-aircraft, a modified Sukhoi T-3 prototype.
- Mohawk YPT-7 Pinto a single Mohawk M1C evaluated by the USAAC as a primary trainer.
- Pratt & Whitney Canada PT-7, a turboprop engine re-designated as the Pratt & Whitney Canada PW100.
- PT-7, a pre-World War II US Navy PT-boat.
