= Part XIII of the Albanian Constitution =

Part Thirteen (Part XIII) of the Constitution of Albania is the thirteenth of eighteen parts. Titled Public Finances, it consists of 7 articles.

== Public Finances ==
— Article 155 —

Taxes, fees, and other financial obligations, national and local, reductions or exemptions of certain categories of taxpayers as well as the method of their collection are specified by law. In such cases, the law may not be given retroactive effect.

— Article 156 —

The State can take and guarantee loans and financial credits when so authorized by law.

— Article 157 —

1. The budgetary system is composed of the state budget and local budgets.
2. The state budget is created by revenues collected from taxes, fees and other financial obligations as well as from other legitimate revenues. It includes all state expenses.
3. Local bodies define and collect taxes and other obligations as provided by law.
4. State and local bodies are obliged to make public their revenues and expenses.

— Article 158 —

1. The Prime Minister, on behalf of the Council of Ministers, presents to the Assembly the draft law on the budget during the autumn session, which cannot be closed without approving it.
2. If the draft law is not approved until the beginning of the next financial year, the Council of Ministers implements every month one-twelfth of the budget of the previous year, until the new budget is approved.
3. The Assembly approves the new budget within three months from the last day of the previous financial year, except when extraordinary measures have been decided.
4. The Council of Ministers is obligated to present to the Assembly a report about the implementation of the budget and about the state debt from the previous year.
5. The Assembly takes a final decision after having also listened to the High State Audit report.

— Article 159 —

Principles and procedures for drafting the draft-budget, as well as for implementing it are defined by law.

— Article 160 —

1. During the financial year, the Assembly may make changes in the budget.
2. The changes in the budget are made based on defined procedures for drafting and approving it.
3. Expenses foreseen in other laws cannot be reduced as long as these laws are in force.

— Article 161 —

1. The Central State Bank is the Bank of Albania. It has the exclusive right to issue and circulate the Albanian currency, to independently implement monetary policy, and maintain and administer the exchange reserves of the Republic of Albania.
2. The Bank of Albania is directed by a council, which is chaired by the Governor. The Governor is elected by the Assembly for 7 years, upon proposal of the President of the Republic, with the right of re-election.
