= Part III of the Albanian Constitution =

Part Three (Part III) of the Constitution of Albania is the third of eighteen parts. Titled The Assembly, it is divided into 4 chapters that consist of 22 articles.

== The Assembly ==
Chapter I: Election and Term

— Article 64 —

1. The Assembly consists of 140 deputies, elected according to a system of proportional elections with regional competition and national threshold.
2. Electoral subjects that reach the national threshold participate in the distribution of mandates.
3. Voters have the right to give a preferential vote for candidates on the electoral lists. The criteria and rules for the implementation of the electoral system, for the designation of electoral zones, the national threshold, the number of mandates for each electoral zone, the distribution of mandates, and the extent of the preferred voting are defined by the law on elections. The election law guarantees that no less than two-thirds of the multi-name list will be subject to preferential voting and will provide gender representation.

— Article 65 —

1. The Assembly is elected every four years. The mandate of the Assembly starts with its first meeting after the elections and ends on the same date, of the same month of the fourth year from the date of the first meeting. In any case, the Assembly remains on duty until the first meeting of the newly elected Assembly.
2. Elections for the new Assembly are held in the nearest electoral period that precedes the date of the ending of the mandate of the Assembly. Electoral periods and the rules for holding the elections for the Assembly are determined by the law on elections.
3. If the Assembly is dissolved prior to the ending of its full mandate, elections are held no later than 45 days after its dissolution.
4. The Assembly may not approve laws during the period 60 days prior to the termination of its mandate until the first meeting of the new Assembly, except in cases when extraordinary measures have been imposed.

— Article 66 —

The mandate of the Assembly is extended only in the case of war and for so long as it continues. When the Assembly is dissolved, it recalls itself.

— Article 67 —

1. The President of the Republic convenes the newly elected Assembly not earlier than the date of the termination of the mandate of the preceding Assembly, but no later than 10 days after such mandate has expired. If the preceding Assembly has been dissolved before the ending of its mandate, the President of the Republic convenes the new Assembly not later than 10 days since the announcement of the election results.
2. If the President of the Republic does not exercise such a competence, the Assembly convenes itself on the tenth day of the period of time provided in point 1 of this Article.

Chapter II: The Deputies

— Article 68 —

1. Candidates for deputies shall be presented at the level of the electoral zone by political parties or by voters. A candidate may be presented by only one of the proposing subjects according to this section. The rules for the registration of the candidates for deputies are determined by the law on elections.
2. The law on elections shall also determine other necessary criteria and rules on the organization and conduct of elections, including those on registration of voters, conduct of electoral campaign, administration and validity of elections and declaration of their results.

— Article 69 —

1. Without resigning from duty, the following may not run as candidates nor be elected deputies:

a) judges, prosecutors;
b) military servicemen on active duty;
c) staff of the police and of National Security;
ç) diplomatic representatives;
d) mayors and heads of communes as well as prefects in the places where they carry out their duties;
dh) chairmen and members of the electoral commissions;
e) the President of the Republic and the high officials of the state Administration contemplated by law.

2. A mandate gained in violation of paragraph 1 of this article is invalid.

— Article 70 —

1. Deputies represent the people and are not bound by any obligatory mandate.
2. Deputies may not simultaneously exercise any other public duty with the exception of that of a member of the Council of Ministers. Other cases of incompatibility are specified by law.
3. Deputies may not carry out any profit-making activity that stems from the property of the state or of local government, nor may they acquire their property.
4. For every violation of paragraph 3 of this article, on the motion of the chairman of the Assembly or one-tenth of its members, the Assembly decides on sending the issue to the Constitutional Court, which determines the incompatibility.

— Article 71 —

1. The mandate of the deputy begins on the day when he is declared elected by the respective electoral commission.
2. The mandate of the deputy ends or is invalid, as the case may be:

a) when he does not take the oath;
b) when he resigns from the mandate;
c) when one of the conditions of ineluctability contemplated in articles 69, and 70, paragraphs 2 and 3 is ascertained;
ç) when the mandate of the Assembly ends;
d) when he is absent for more than six consecutive months in the Assembly without reason.
dh) when he is convicted by a final court decision for commitment of a crime.

— Article 72 —

Before beginning the exercise of the mandate, the deputies take the oath in the Assembly.

— Article 73 —

1. The deputy is not held responsible for opinions expressed in the Assembly and votes cast by him in the exercise of the function. This provision is not applicable in the case of defamation.
2. A deputy cannot be arrested or deprive him of liberty in any form nor may a personal search or a search of the residence be exercised against him without the authorisation of the Assembly.
3. A deputy can be detained or arrested without authorisation when captured during or immediately after the commission of a crime. The General Prosecutor or the Chief Special Prosecutor immediately notifies the Assembly, which, when it finds that there is no room for proceedings, orders the lifting of the measure.
4. For the cases provided in paragraphs 2 and 3 of this article, the Assembly may hold discussions in closed sessions for reasons of data protection. The decision is taken by open voting.

Chapter III: Organization and Functioning

— Article 74 —

1. The Assembly conducts its annual work in two sessions. The first session begins on the third Monday of January and the second session on the first Monday of September.
2. The Assembly meets in extraordinary session when it is requested by the President of the Republic, the Prime Minister or by one-fifth of all the deputies.
3. Extraordinary sessions are called by the Speaker of the Assembly on the basis of a defined agenda.

— Article 75 —

1. The Assembly elects and discharges its chairman.
2. The Assembly is organized and functions according to regulations approved by the majority of all the members.

— Article 76 —

1. The Chairman chairs debates, directs the work, assures respect for the rights of the Assembly and its members, as well as represents the Assembly in relations with others.
2. The highest civil employee of the Assembly is the General Secretary.
3. Other services necessary for the functioning of the Assembly are carried out by other employees, as is specified in the internal regulations.

— Article 77 —

1. The Assembly elects standing committees from its ranks and may also establish special committees.
2. The Assembly has the right and, upon the request of one-fourth of its members is obliged, to designate investigator committees to review a particular issue. Its conclusions are not binding on the courts, but they may be made known to the office of the prosecutor, which evaluates them according to legal procedures.
3. Investigator committees operate according to the procedures set by law.

— Article 78 —

1. The Assembly decides with a majority of votes, in the presence of more than half of its members, except for the cases where the Constitution provides for a qualified majority.
2. Meetings of the deputies, which are convened without being called in accordance to the regulations, do not have any effect.

— Article 79 —

1. Meetings of the Assembly are open.
2. At the request of the President of the Republic, the Prime Minister or one-fifth of the deputies, meetings of the Assembly may be closed, when a majority of all its members have voted in favor of it.

— Article 80 —

1. The Prime Minister and any other member of the Council of Ministers is obligated to answer hearing and questions of the deputies within three weeks.
2. A member of the Council of Ministers has the right to take part in meetings of the Assembly or of its committees; he is given the floor whenever he requests it.
3. The heads of state institutions, on request of the parliamentary committees, give explanations and inform on specific issues of their activity to the extent that law permits.

Chapter IV: The Legislative Process

— Article 81 —

1. The Council of Ministers, every deputy, and 20,000 electors each have the right to propose laws.
2. The following are approved by three-fifths of all members of the Assembly:

a) the laws for the organization and operation of the institutions provided for in the Constitution;
b) the law on citizenship;
c) the law on general and local elections;
ç) the law on referenda;
d) the codes;
dh) the law for the state of emergency;
e) the law on the status of public functionaries;
ë) the law on amnesty;
f) the law on administrative divisions of the Republic.

— Article 82 —

1. The proposal of laws, when this is the case, must always be accompanied by a report that justifies the financial expenses for its implementation.
2. No non-governmental draft law that makes necessary an increase in the expenses of the state budget or diminishes income may be approved without taking the opinion of the Council of Ministers, which must be given within 30 days from the date of receiving the draft law.
3. If the Council of Ministers does not give an answer within the above term, the draft law passes for review according to the normal procedure.

— Article 83 —

1. A draft law is voted on three times: in principle, article by article, and in its entirety.
2. The Assembly may, at the request of the Council of Ministers or one-fifth of all the deputies, review and approve a draft law with an expedited procedure, but not sooner than one week from the beginning of the procedure of review.
3. The expedited procedure is not permitted for the review of the draft laws contemplated in Article 81, paragraph 2, with the exception of subparagraph a.

— Article 84 —

1. President of the Republic promulgates the approved law within 20 days from its presentation.
2. The law shall be considered as promulgated, if the President does not assume the entitlements provided for in paragraph 1 of this Article and in paragraph 1 of Article 85.
3. The law shall enter into effect not earlier than 15 days since its publication in the Official Journal.
4. In the event of the extraordinary measures, as well as in case of need and emergency, the law shall enter into effect immediately, after being announced publicly. The law shall be published in the upcoming edition of the Official Journal.

— Article 85 —

1. The President of the Republic has the right to return a law for review only once.
2. The decree of the President for the review of a law loses its effect when a majority of all the members of the Assembly vote against it.
