= Part XI of the Albanian Constitution =

Part Eleven (Part XI) of the Constitution of Albania is the eleventh of eighteen parts. Titled Referendum, it consists of 3 articles.

== Referendum ==
— Article 150 —

1. The people, through 50 thousand citizens, who enjoy the right to vote, have the right to a referendum for the abrogation of a law, as well as to request the President of the Republic to hold a referendum about issues of special importance.
2. The Assembly, upon the proposal of not less than one-fifth of the deputies or the Council of Ministers, can decide that an issue or a draft law of special importance be presented for referendum.
3. Principles and procedures for holding a referendum, as well as its validity, are provided by law.

— Article 151 —

1. A law approved by referendum is promulgated by the President of the Republic.
2. Issues related to the territorial integrity of the Republic of Albania, limitations of fundamental human rights and freedoms, budget, taxes, financial obligations of the state, declaration and abrogation of the state of emergency, declaration of war and peace, as well as amnesty, cannot be voted upon in a referendum.
3. A referendum upon the same issue cannot be repeated before 3 years have passed since it was held.

— Article 152 —

1. The Constitutional Court reviews preliminarily the constitutionality of the issues presented for a referendum according to Article 150, paragraphs 1 and 2, Article 151, paragraphs 2 and 3, as well as Article 177, paragraphs 4 and 5, within 60 days.
2. The importance of special issues, as provided in paragraphs 1 and 2 of article 150, is not subject to adjudication in the Constitutional Court.
3. The date of the referendum is set by the President of the Republic within 45 days after the promulgation of the positive decision of the Constitutional Court or after the term within which the Constitutional Court had to have expressed itself has expired. Referenda can be held only in one day of the year.
