= Part X of the Albanian Constitution =

Part Ten (Part X) of the Constitution of Albania is the tenth of eighteen parts. Titled The Office of the Prosecutor, it consists of 13 articles. Together with Part Eight (Constitutional Court), and Part Nine (The Courts) underwent radical changes in 2016 during the so-called Justice Reform, which were the efforts of lawmakers to fight corruption, organized crime, nepotism in the justice system.

== The Office of the Prosecutor ==
— Article 148 —

1. The Prosecution Office exercises criminal prosecution and represents accusation in court on behalf of the state. The Prosecution Office performs other duties defined by law.
2. The Prosecution Office is an independent body, which shall ensure the coordination and control of its actions as well as respects the internal independence of prosecutors to investigate and prosecute, in accordance with the law.
3. The prosecution is organized and functions attached to the judiciary system.
4. The Special Prosecution Office and the Special Investigation Unit for the prosecution and investigation of criminal offences of corruption, organized crime and crimes in accordance with Article 135 paragraph 2 of the Constitution shall be independent from the Prosecutor General. The Special Investigation Unit shall be subordinated to the Special Prosecution Office.

— Article 148/a —

1. The Prosecutor General is appointed by three-fifths of the members of Assembly among three candidates proposed by the High Prosecutorial Council, for a seven-year mandate, without the right to re-appointment.
2. The High Prosecutorial Council shall select and rank the three most qualified candidates, based on an open and transparent procedure and forwards them to the Assembly, in accordance with the law.
3. The Prosecutor General shall be elected among the ranks of prominent jurists, with not less than 15 years of professional experience, of high moral and professional integrity, who have graduated from the School of Magistrates or have an academic degree in law. The candidate should not have held political posts in the public administration or leadership positions in a political party in the last past 10 years before running as a candidate.
4. In case the Assembly fails to elect the Prosecutor General within 30 days of receiving the proposals, the candidate ranked first by the High Prosecutorial Council, shall be declared appointed.
5. Upon completion of the mandate and upon his or her request, the Prosecutor General shall be appointed in the position he or she held before the appointment or as judge in the Court of Appeal.

— Article 148/b —

The Prosecutor General exercises these powers:
1. Represents accusation before the High Court and cases before the Constitutional Court, except for the case where the representation is made by the Special Prosecution Office;
2. Issues written general guidance to prosecutors, with the exception of prosecutors of the Special Prosecution Office;
3. Manages the Prosecution Office administration, with the exception of the administration of the Special Prosecution Office. The establishment and management of the information technology structure is regulated upon decision of the Council of Ministers;
4. Proposes and administers the budget of the Prosecution Office, with the exception of the budget for the Special Prosecution Office;
5. Reports to the Assembly on the situation of criminality; 6. Exercises other powers defined by law.

— Article 148/c —

1. The mandate of the Prosecutor General shall end when:

a) Reaching the retirement age;
b) The 7 year mandate expires;
c) He/she resigns;
ç) Dismissed according to a procedure provided in Article 149/c of the Constitution;
d) Establishing the conditions of inelectability and incompatibility in assuming the function;
dh) Establishing the fact of incapacity to exercise the duties;

2. The termination of the mandate of the Prosecutor General is declared by decision of the High Prosecutorial Council.

— Article 148/ç —

1. Prosecutor can be Albanian citizens appointed by the High Prosecutorial Council after being graduated from the School of Magistrates and after the conduction of a preliminary process of verification of their assets and their background checks, in accordance with the law.
2. Further criteria for the selection and appointment of prosecutors are provided for by law.

— Article 148/d —

1. The prosecutor shall be disciplinarily liable in accordance with the law.
2. The prosecutor shall be dismissed upon decision of the High Prosecutorial Council when:

a) Committing serious professional or ethical misconduct which discredit the position and the image of the prosecutor in the course of performing the duty;
b) Sentenced by a final court decision for commission of a crime.

3. Against the dismissal decision may be appealed to the Constitutional Court.
4. The prosecutor shall be suspended from duty upon decision of the High Prosecutorial Council when:

a) Upon him/her is imposed the personal security measure of “arrest in prison” or “house arrest” for commission of a criminal offence;
b) He/she obtains the capacity of the defendant for a serious offence committed intentionally;
c) Disciplinary proceedings being initiated under the law”.

— Article 148/dh —

1. The Special Prosecution Office exercises criminal prosecution and represents accusation before the specialized courts under article 135 paragraph 2 of the Constitution as well as before the High Court.
2. The Special Prosecution Office shall consist of at least 10 prosecutors, who shall be appointed by the High Prosecutorial Council for a 9 year term, without the right to re-appointment. The law shall provide further criteria for the selection as well as for the transparent and open procedure of appointment.
3. The Chief Special Prosecutor of the Special Prosecution Office shall be elected from the ranks of the prosecutors of this Prosecution Office by a majority of the members of the High Prosecutorial Council for a three-year term, without the right to reappointment, in accordance with the law.
4. The prosecutor of the Special Prosecution Office may be dismissed from office for commission of a crime or serious disciplinary misconduct by a 2/3 majority of the members of the High Prosecutorial Council.
5. The candidate for prosecutor, investigation officer, administrative staff of the Special Prosecution Office, Special Investigation Unit, as well as their close family members, prior to their appointment, shall be subject to a verification of their assets and their background checks, shall consent to periodic reviews of their financial accounts and personal telecommunications, in accordance with the law.

— Article 149 —

1. The High Prosecutorial Council shall guarantee the independence, accountability, discipline, status and career of Prosecutors in the Republic of Albania. 9 Amended previously by the law amending Article 149.
2. The High Prosecutorial Council shall be composed of 11 members, six of whom shall be elected by the prosecutors of all levels of the Prosecution Office and five members shall be elected by the Assembly among lawyers who are not prosecutors.
3. The prosecutor members shall be selected from the ranks of prosecutors of high moral and professional integrity in accordance with an open and transparent procedure that ensures a fair representation of all levels of the prosecution system. The lay members shall be selected among prominent jurists, with not less than 15 years of professional experience, of high moral and professional integrity. They should not have held political posts in the public administration or leadership positions in a political party in the last past 10 years before running as a candidate. Further criteria and the procedure for selecting the candidates shall be regulated by law.
4. Two lay members shall be elected from the ranks of advocates, two members from the corps of pedagogues of law faculties and the School of Magistrates and one member from civil society. The Secretary General of the Assembly, based on an open and transparent procedure, shall announce the vacancies in accordance with the law.
5. The Secretary General of the Assembly, not later than 10 days from the submission of candidatures, shall verify if the candidates fulfil the criteria foreseen in the Constitution and the law and shall assess the professional and moral criteria to be a member of the High Prosecutorial Council and shall prepare the list. In case the candidates do not fulfil the criteria and conditions to be elected, the Secretary General of the Assembly shall not include their names in the list.
6. The Secretary General of the Assembly, upon completion of the verification, shall immediately send the list of candidates who fulfil the formal criteria to the parliamentary subcommittee, in accordance with paragraph 7 of this article.
7. The standing committee responsible for legal affairs in the Assembly shall establish a subcommittee for the further assessment and selection of candidates not later than three days from the submission of the list. The subcommittee is composed of five members of the Assembly, three members nominated by the parliamentary majority and two by the parliamentary minority. The subcommittee may, with at least four votes, include in the list of candidates even those who have been excluded from the list by the Secretary General of the Assembly for failure to comply with formal requirements. The subcommittee shall select the candidates with the support of at least 4 members. In case the required majority cannot be reached, the candidates shall be selected by lot.
8. The names of the candidates selected by the subcommittee are consolidated into one list and sent to the Speaker of the Assembly. Within ten days, the Assembly shall approve the list of candidates by two-thirds of all the members. In case the list is rejected, the procedure shall be repeated in the subcommittee under paragraph 7 of this Article, but no more than two times. In case the Assembly, after conducting the procedure for the third time, shall not approve the presented list, the candidates of this list shall be deemed elected. Detailed procedures shall be regulated by law.
9. The Chairperson of the High Prosecutorial Council shall be elected at the first meeting of the Council from among the lay members in accordance with the law.
10. Members of the High Prosecutorial Council shall practice their duty full-time for a period of five years, without the right of immediate re-election. At the end of the term, the prosecutor members return to their previous working positions. The mandate of the special prosecutor shall be suspended during the period of time of the exercise of the function as member of High Prosecutorial Council. The lay members, who before the appointment worked full time in the public sector, shall return to the previous working positions or, if not possible, to positions equivalent to them.

— Article 149/a —

1. The High Prosecutorial Council shall exercise the following powers:

a) Appoints, evaluates, promotes and transfers all prosecutors of all levels;
b) Decides on disciplinary measures against all prosecutors of all levels;
c) Proposes to the Assembly candidates for Prosecutor General in accordance with the law;
ç) Adopts rules of ethics for prosecutors and supervises their observance;
d) Proposes and administers its own budget;
dh) Informs the public and the Assembly on the state of the Prosecution Office;
e) Performs other functions as defined by law.

2. The law may provide for the establishment of decision making committees of the High Prosecutorial Council.

— Article 149/b —

1. The mandate of the member of the High Prosecutorial Council shall end when:

a) Reaching the retirement age;
b) The 5 year mandate expires;
c) He/she resigns;
ç) Dismissed according to the provisions of article 149/c of the Constitution;
d) Establishing the conditions of ineluctability and incompatibility in assuming the function;
dh) Establishing the fact of incapacity to exercise the duties;

2. The expiry of the mandate shall be declared upon a decision of the High Prosecutorial Council.
3. Where the position of the member remains vacant, the body having appointed the preceding member, shall under Article 149, appoint the new member, the latter staying in office until the expiry of the member of the outgoing member.
4. The member of the High Prosecutorial Council shall stay in office until the appointment of the successor, except for the cases provided in subparagraph c), ç), d) and dh) of paragraph 1 of this article.

— Article 149/c —

1. The Prosecutor General and the members of the High Prosecutorial Council shall be disciplinarily liable in accordance with the law.
2. The Prosecutor General and the members of the High Prosecutorial Council shall be dismissed upon decision of the Constitutional Court when:

a) Committing serious professional or ethical misconduct;
b) Sentenced by a final court decision for commission of a crime.

3.The Prosecutor General and the members of the High Prosecutorial Council shall be suspended from duty upon decision of the Constitutional Court when:

a) Upon him/her is imposed the personal security measure of “arrest in prison” or “house arrest” for commission of a criminal offence;
b) He/she obtains the capacity of the defendant for a serious offence committed intentionally;
c) Disciplinary proceedings being initiated under the law”.

— Article 149/ç —

Being Prosecutor General, prosecutor or a member of the High Prosecutorial Council shall not be compatible with any other state or political activity, as well as with any professional activity exercised against payment, except for teaching, academic or scientific activities.

— Article 149/d —

1. The Justice Appointments Council is responsible for verifying the fulfillment of legal requirements and assessment of professional and moral criteria of the candidates for the High Justice Inspector, as well as for the members of the Constitutional Court. The Justice Appointments Council examines and ranks the candidates according to their professional merits. The ranking of candidates is not binding, except when the Assembly fails to make an appointment.
2. The Justice Appointments Council meets whenever it is necessary.
3. The Justice Appointments Council shall consist of nine members selected by lot from the ranks of judges and prosecutors, who are not under disciplinary measures. They shall serve a one-year term beginning on January 1 of each calendar year. Between December 1 and December 5 of each year, the President of the Republic shall select by lot two judges of the Constitutional Court, one judge of the High Court, one prosecutor of the General Prosecution Office, two judges and two prosecutors from the Courts of Appeal and one judge from the Administrative Courts. If the President of the Republic fails to select the members by December 5, the Speaker of the Assembly shall make the selection by lot before December 10 of that calendar year. The People’s Advocate shall participate as an observer in the selection by lot and in the meetings and operations of the Justice Appointment Council.
4. The member from the High Court shall be the Chairperson of the Justice Appointments Council. The High Court creates working conditions for the operation of the Justice Appointments Council.
5. Further criteria on the scale of qualification of candidates participating in the lot shall be provided by law. The organization and functioning of the Justice Appointments Council shall be regulated by law.
