= Part IX of the Albanian Constitution =

Part Nine (Part IX) of the Constitution of Albania is the ninth of eighteen parts. Titled The Courts, it consists of 22 articles including the Article 144 which was repealed in 2016. Together with Part Eight (Constitutional Court), and Part Ten (The Office of the Prosecutor) underwent radical changes in 2016 during the so-called Justice Reform, which were the efforts of lawmakers to fight corruption, organized crime, nepotism in the justice system.

== The Courts ==
— Article 135 —

1. The judicial power shall be assumed by the High Court as well as by the appeal courts, first instance courts, which shall be established by law.
2. Specialized courts shall be competent to adjudicate corruption and organized crime, as well as criminal charges against the President of the Republic, Speaker of the Assembly, Prime minister, the member of the Council of Ministers, the judge of the Constitutional Court and High Court, the Prosecutor General, High Justice Inspector, the Mayor, Deputy of the Assembly, deputy minister, the member of the High Judicial Council and High Prosecutorial Council, and heads of central or independent institutions as defined by the Constitution or by law, as well as charges against former officials as mentioned above.
3. The Assembly may establish by law other specialized courts, however, under no circumstances shall it establish extraordinary courts.
4. Judges of the specialized courts provided for in paragraph 2 of this Article shall be appointed by the High Judicial Council in accordance with the law. Judges of the specialized courts may be dismissed from office with a 2/3 majority of the members of the High Judicial Council. The candidates for judges and judicial civil servants in the specialized courts, as well as their close family members, prior to their appointment, shall be subject to the verification of their assets and their background checks and shall consent to periodic reviews of their financial accounts and personal telecommunications, in accordance with the law.

— Article 136 —

1. The judges of the High Court shall be appointed by the President of the Republic upon proposal of the High Judicial Council, for a 9 year term, without the right to re-appointment.
2. The President of the Republic, within 10 days following the day of the decision of the High Judicial Council, shall appoint the judge of the High Court, except for the cases where the President finds out that the candidate fails to meet the qualification criteria or conditions for electability in accordance with the law. The decree of the President of the Republic rejecting the appointment of the candidate loses its effect when the majority of the members of the High Judicial Council vote against the decree. In this case, as well as in case the President is silent, the candidate shall be deemed appointed and shall take office within 15 days following the date of the High Judicial Council’s decision.
3. The judges of the High Court shall be selected from the ranks of the judges with at least 13 years of experience in practicing the profession. One-fifth of the judges in this court shall be selected from among those prominent jurists with not less than 15 years of experience as advocates, law professors or lectors, high level lawyers in the public administration or other fields of law. The candidates selected from among the ranks of lawyers must have a law degree.
4. The candidates who are not judges should not have held political posts in the public administration or leadership positions in a political party in the past 10 years before running as a candidate. Further criteria and the procedure of selection of the judges shall be provided for by law. 5. The High Court judge shall stay in office until the appointment of the successor, except for the cases provided for in Article 139, paragraph 3, subparagraph c), ç), d) and dh).

— Article 136/a —

1. Judge can be an Albanian citizen appointed by the High Judicial Council after graduating the School of Magistrates and after the conduction of a preliminary process of verification of their assets and their background checks, in accordance with the law.
2. Further criteria for the selection and appointment of the judges are provided for by law.

— Article 137 —

The judge shall enjoy immunity in connection with the opinions expressed and the decisions made in the course of assuming the functions, except for the cases where the judge deliberately issues a decision as result of a self-interest or in bad faith.

— Article 138 —

The salary and other benefits of judges cannot be reduced, except for cases where:

a) General economic and financial measures need to be undertaken in order to avoid difficult economic situations of the country or other national emergences;
b) The judge returns to the previous position which he or she held prior to the appointment;
c) A disciplinary measure is imposed on him/her or he/she is evaluated professionally incapable, in accordance with the law.

— Article 139 —

1. The mandate of the High Court judge shall end, when:

a) Reaching the retirement age;
b) The 9 year mandate expires;
c) He/she resigns;
ç) Dismissed as provided in Article 140 of the Constitution;
d) Establishing the conditions of ineluctability and incompatibility in assuming the function;
dh) Establishing the fact of incapacity to exercise the duties;

2. The end of the mandate of the High Court judge shall be declared upon the decision of the High Court.
3. The procedure for the appointment of the judge to another court upon the expiry of the mandate is regulated by law.

— Article 140 —

1. The judge shall be disciplinarily liable under the law.
2. The judge shall be dismissed by decision of the High Judicial Council when:

a) Committing serious professional or ethical misconduct which discredit the position and the image of the judge in the course of performing the duty;
b) Sentenced by a final court decision for commission of a crime.

3. The judge shall be suspended from duty by decision of the High Judicial Council when:

a) Upon him/her is imposed the personal security measure of “arrest in prison” or “house arrest” for commission of a criminal offence;
b) He/she obtains the capacity of the defendant for a serious offence committed intentionally;
c) Disciplinary proceedings being initiated under the law”.

4. Against the dismissal decision may be appealed to the Constitutional Court.

— Article 141 —

1. The High Court shall examine issues concerning the meaning and application of the law in order to ensure the unification or development of case law, in accordance with the law.
2. For the amendment of the case law, the High Court shall review in the Joint Chambers specific judicial issues decided by the chambers, in accordance with the law.

— Article 142 —

1. Judicial decisions must be reasoned.
2. The High Court must publish its decisions as well as the minority opinions.
3. The state bodies are obliged to execute judicial decisions.

— Article 143 —

Being a judge shall not be compatible with any other political or state activity, as well as any professional activity exercised against payment, except for teaching, academic, scientific activities, or secondment to justice system institutions in accordance with the law.

— Article 144 —

REPEALED

— Article 145 —

1. Judges are independent and subject only to the Constitution and the laws.
2. When judges find that a law comes into conflict with the Constitution, they do not apply it. In this case, they suspend the proceedings and send the case to the Constitutional Court. Decisions of the Constitutional Court are obligatory for all courts.
3. Interference in the activity of the courts or the judges entails liability according to law.

— Article 146 —

1. Courts give decisions in the name of the Republic.
2. In every case judicial decisions are announced publicly.

— Article 147 —

1. The High Judicial Council shall ensure the independence, accountability and appropriate functionality of the judicial power in the Republic of Albania.
2. The High Judicial Council shall be composed of 11 members, six of which are elected by the judges of all levels of the judicial power and five members are elected by the Assembly among the ranks of lawyers who are not judges.
3. The judge members shall be selected from the ranks of judges of high moral and professional integrity in accordance with an open and transparent procedure that ensures a fair representation of all levels of the judiciary. The lay members shall be selected among the ranks of prominent jurists, with not less than 15 years of professional experience, of high moral and professional integrity. They should not have held political posts in the public administration or leadership positions in a political party in the last past 10 years before running as candidates. Further criteria and the procedure for selecting the candidates shall be regulated by law.
4. Two lay members shall be elected from the ranks of advocates, two members from the corps of pedagogues of law faculties and the School of Magistrates, and one member from civil society. The Secretary General of the Assembly, based on an open and transparent procedure, shall announce the vacancies in accordance with the law.
5. The Secretary General of the Assembly, not later than 10 days from the submission candidatures, shall verify if the candidates fulfil the criteria foreseen in the Constitution and the law and shall assess the professional and moral criteria for the member of the High Judicial Council and shall prepare the list. In case the candidates do not fulfil the criteria and conditions to be elected, the Secretary General of the Assembly shall not include their names in the list.
6. The Secretary General of the Assembly, upon completion of the verification, shall immediately send the list of candidates who fulfil the formal criteria to the parliamentary subcommittee, in accordance with paragraph 7 of this article.
7. The standing committee responsible for legal affairs in the Assembly shall establish a subcommittee for the further assessment and selection of candidates not later than three days from the submission of the list. The subcommittee is composed of five members of the Assembly, three members nominated by the parliamentary majority and two by the parliamentary minority. The subcommittee may, with at least four votes, include in the list of candidates even those who have been excluded from the list by the Secretary General of the Assembly for failure to comply with formal requirements. The subcommittee shall select the candidates with the support of at least 4 members. In case the required majority cannot be reached, the candidates shall be selected by lot.
8. The names of the candidates selected by the subcommittee are consolidated into one list and sent to the Speaker of the Assembly. Within ten days, the Assembly shall approve the list of candidates by two-thirds of all the members. In case the list is rejected, the procedure shall be repeated in the subcommittee under paragraph 7 of this Article, but not more than two times. In case the Assembly shall, after conducting the procedure for the third time, not approve the presented list, the candidates of this list shall be deemed elected. Detailed procedures shall be regulated by law.
9. The Chairperson of the High Judicial Council shall be elected at the first meeting of the Council from among the lay members in accordance with the law.
10. Members of the High Judicial Council shall practice their duty full-time for a period of five years, without the right to immediate re-election. At the end of the term, the judge members return to their previous working positions. The mandate of judges of the High Court or specialized courts shall be suspended during the period of time of their service as member of High Judicial Council. The lay members, who before the appointment worked full time in the public sector, shall return to the previous working positions or, if not possible, to positions equivalent to them.

— Article 147/a —

1. The High Judicial Council shall exercise the following powers:

a) Appoints, evaluates, promotes and transfers judges of all levels;
b) Decides on disciplinary measures on judges of all levels;
c) Proposes to the President of the Republic candidates for judges of the High Court, in accordance with the law;
ç) Approves the rules of judicial ethics and monitors their observation;
d) Directs and manages the administration of the courts with the exception of the management of the information technology structure of the courts, which is regulated upon decision of the Council of Ministers;
dh) Proposes and administers its own budget and the budget of the courts;
e) Informs the public and the Assembly on the state of the judicial system;
ë) Exercises other powers defined by law.

2. The law may provide for the establishment of decision making committees of the High Judicial Council.
3. The Minister of Justice may participate, without the right to vote, in the meetings of the High Judicial Council when issues of strategic planning and budget of the judiciary are discussed.

— Article 147/b —

1. The mandate of the member of the High Judicial Council shall end when:

a) Reaching the retirement age;
b) The 5 year mandate expires;
c) He/she resigns;
ç) Dismissed in accordance with the provisions of Article 147/c of the Constitution;
d) Establishing the conditions of ineluctability and incompatibility in assuming the function;
dh) Establishing the fact of incapacity to exercise the duties;

2.The expiry of the mandate of the member shall be declared upon a decision of the High Judicial Council.
3. Where the position of the member remains vacant, the body having appointed the preceding member, shall, under Article 147, appoint the new member, the latter staying in office until the expiry of the member of the outgoing member.
4. The member of the High Judicial Council shall stay in office until the appointment of the successor, except for the cases provided in subparagraph c), ç), d) and dh) of paragraph 1 of this Article.

— Article 147/c —

1. The member of the High Judicial Council shall be disciplinarily liable in accordance with the law.
2. The member shall be dismissed upon decision of the Constitutional Court when:

a) Committing serious professional or ethical misconduct;
b) Sentenced by a final court decision for commission of a crime.

3. The member of the High Judicial Council shall be suspended from duty upon decision of the Constitutional Court when:

a) Upon him/her is imposed the personal security measure of “arrest in prison” or “house arrest” for commission of a criminal offence;
b) He/she obtains the capacity of the defendant for a serious offence committed intentionally;
c) Disciplinary proceedings being initiated under the law.

— Article 147/ç —

Being a member of the High Judicial Council shall not be compatible with any other political or state activity, as well as any other professional activity exercised against payment, except for teaching, academic and scientific activities in accordance with the law.

— Article 147/d —

1. The High Justice Inspector shall be responsible for the verification of complaints, investigation of violations on its own initiative and the initiation of disciplinary proceedings against judges and prosecutors of all levels, members of the High Judicial Council, High Prosecutorial Council and the Prosecutor General, in accordance with the procedure defined by law.
2. The High Justice Inspector shall also be responsible for the institutional inspection of courts and prosecution offices.
3. The High Justice Inspector is elected upon three fifth majority of all members of the Assembly, for a nine year term, without the right to re-election, among the ranks of prominent jurists with no less than 15 years of professional experience, of high moral and professional integrity. He or she should not have held political posts in the public administration or leadership positions in a political party in the last past 10 years before running as a candidate.
4. The High Justice Inspector is elected from the list of five candidates selected and ranked based on merits by the Justice Appointment Council, in compliance with a transparent and open procedure. In case the Assembly does not reach the majority of three-fifths for any of the candidates within 30 days of receiving the list, the candidate ranked first shall be declared appointed.
5. The High Justice Inspector shall enjoy the status of the High Court judge.
6. The procedures for the decision making of the High Justice Inspector are regulated by law. Appeals against decisions relating to disciplinary measures against other inspectors shall be examined by the Constitutional Court.

— Article 147/dh —

1. The mandate of the High Justice Inspector shall end when:

a) Reaching the retirement age;
b) The 9 year mandate expires;
c) He/she resigns;
ç) Dismissed in accordance with Article 147/e of the Constitution;
d) Establishing the conditions of ineluctability and incompatibility in assuming the function;
dh) Establishing the fact of incapacity to exercise the duties;

2. The end of the mandate of the High Justice Inspector is declared by decision of the joint meeting of the High Judicial Council and High Prosecutorial Council.
3. The High Justice Inspector shall stay in office until the appointment of the new Inspector, except for the cases under paragraph 1, subparagraph c, ç), d), and dh).
4. Upon completion of the mandate, upon his or her request, the High Justice Inspector shall return to the position he or she held before the appointment or in a position equivalent to it.

— Article 147/e —

1. The High Justice Inspector shall be disciplinarily liable in accordance with the law.
2. The High Justice Inspector shall be dismissed upon decision of the Constitutional Court when:

a) Committing serious professional or ethical misconduct;
b) Sentenced by a final court decision for commission of a crime;

3. A parliamentary inquiry commission shall investigate allegations of misconduct by the High Justice Inspector, respecting his or her rights to a fair trial. The inquiry commission shall, in case it finds out misconduct as provided in paragraph 2 of this Article, propose to the Constitutional Court the dismissal of the High Justice Inspector, in accordance with the law.
4. The High Justice Inspector shall be suspended from duty upon decision of the Constitutional Court when:

a) Upon him/her is imposed the personal security measure of “arrest in prison” or “house arrest” for commission of a criminal offence;
b) He/she obtains the capacity of the defendant for a serious offence committed intentionally;
c) Disciplinary proceedings being initiated under the law”.

— Article 147/ë —

Being the High Justice Inspector shall not be compatible with any other political or state activity, as well as professional activity exercised against payment, except for teaching, academic or scientific activities, in accordance with the law.
