= Fundamental Statute of the Albanian Kingdom (1928) =

Former constitution of the Albanian Kingdom

The Fundamental Statute of the Albanian Kingdom was the constitution of the Albanian Kingdom of 1928–39. It was introduced by King Zog I of Albania.

The 1928 Fundamental Statute was replaced in 1939, after the Italian invasion of Albania. On 3 June 1939, King Victor Emmanuel III of Italy promulgated a new constitution for the Albanian Kingdom of 1939–43.

== See also ==
- List of constitutions of Albania

== Bibliography ==
- Patrice Najbor, Histoire de l'Albanie et de sa maison royale (5 volumes), JePublie, Paris, 2008, (ISBN 978-2-9532382-0-4).
- Patrice Najbor, La dynastye des Zogu, Textes & Prétextes, Paris, 2002
