= Part VI of the Albanian Constitution =

Part Six (Part VI) of the Constitution of Albania is the sixth of eighteen parts. Titled Local Government, it consists of 8 articles.

== Local Government ==
— Article 108 —

1. The units of local government are communes or municipalities and regions. Other units of local government are regulated by law.
2. The territorial-administrative division of the units of local government are established by law on the basis of mutual economic needs and interests and historical tradition. Their borders may not be changed without first taking the opinion of the inhabitants.
3. Communes and municipalities are the basic units of local government. They perform all the duties of self-government, with the exception of those that the law gives to other units of local government.
4. Self-government in the local units is exercised through their representative organs and local referenda. The principles and procedures for the organization of local referenda are provided by law in accordance with article 151, paragraph 2.

— Article 109 —

1. The representative authorities of the basic local governance shall be the councils, which are elected in every four years, through general, direct and secret voting.
2. The executive organ of a municipality or commune is the Chairman, who is elected directly by the people in the manner provided for in paragraph 1 of this article.
3. Only citizens who have a permanent residence in the territory of the respective local entity have the right to be elected to the local councils and as chairman of the municipality or commune.
4. The organs of local government units have the right to form unions and joint institutions with one another for the representation of their interests, to cooperate with local units of other countries, and also to be represented in international organizations of local powers

— Article 110 —

1. A region consists of several basic units of local government with traditional, economic and social ties and joint interests.
2. The region is the unit in which regional policies are constructed and implemented and where they are harmonized with state policy.
3. The representative organ of the region is the Regional Council. Municipalities and communes delegate members to the Regional Council in proportion to their population, but always at least one member. The chairmen of communes and municipalities are always members of the Regional Council. Other members are elected through proportional lists from among the municipal or communal councilors by their respective councils.
4. The Regional Council has the right to issue orders and decisions with general obligatory force for the region.

— Article 111 —

1. The units of local government are legal entities.
2. The units of local government have an independent budget, which is created in the manner provided by law.

— Article 112 —

1. Powers of state administration by law may be delegated to units of local government. Expenses that are incurred in the exercise of the delegation are covered by the state.
2. Bodies of local government are assigned duties only in compliance with law or according to agreements achieved by them. The expenses that are connected with the duties assigned by law to the bodies of local government are covered by the budget of the state.

— Article 113 —

1. The councils of the communes, municipalities and regions:

a) regulate and administer in an independent manner local issues within their jurisdiction;
b) exercise the rights of ownership, administer in an independent manner the income created, and also have the right to exercise economic activity;
c) have the right to collect and spend the income that is necessary for the exercise of their functions;
ç) have the right, in compliance with law, to establish local taxes as well as their level;
d) establish rules for their organization and functioning in compliance with law;
dh) create symbols of local government as well as local titles of honor;
e) undertake initiatives for local issues before the bodies defined by law.

2. The bodies of local government issue directives, decisions and orders.
3. The rights of self-government of the units of local government are protected in court.

— Article 114 —

The Council of Ministers appoints a prefect in every region as its representative. The powers of the prefect are defined by law.

— Article 115 —

1. A directly elected body of a local government unit may be dissolved or discharged by the Council of Ministers for serious violations of the Constitution or the laws.
2. The dissolved or discharged body has the right to complain, within 15 days, to the Constitutional Court, and in this case, the decision of the Council of Ministers is suspended.
3. If the right to complain is not exercised within 15 days, or when the Constitutional Court upholds the decision of the Council of Ministers, the President of the Republic sets a date for holding of elections of the respective unit of local government.
