= Part V of the Albanian Constitution =

Part Five (Part V) of the Constitution of Albania is the fifth of eighteen parts. Titled The Council of Ministers, it consists of 13 articles.

== The Council of Ministers ==
— Article 95 —

1. The Council of Ministers consists of the Prime Minister, deputy prime minister, and ministers.
2. The Council of Ministers exercises every state function that is not given to other bodies of State power or local government

— Article 96 —

1. The President of the Republic, at the beginning of the legislature, as well as when the post of the Prime Minister remains vacant, appoints the Prime Minister on the proposal of the party or coalition of parties that have the majority of seats in the Assembly.
2. When the appointed Prime Minister is not approved by the Assembly, the President appoints a new Prime Minister within 10 days.
3. When even the newly appointed Prime Minister is not approved by the Assembly, the Assembly elects another Prime Minister within 10 days. In this case, the President appoints the new Prime Minister.
4. If the Assembly fails to elect a new Prime Minister, the President of the Republic dissolves the Assembly.

— Article 97 —

The Prime Minister appointed according to Article 96, Article 104 or Article 105 presents to the Assembly for approval, within 10 days, the policy program of the Council of Ministers together with its composition.

— Article 98 —

1. A minister is appointed and dismissed by the President of the Republic, on the proposal of the Prime Minister, within 7 days.
2. The decree is reviewed by the Assembly within 10 days.

— Article 99 —

Before the Prime Minister, deputy prime minister, and ministers take the office, they swear before the President of the Republic.

— Article 100 —

1. The Council of Ministers determines the principal directions of the general state policy.
2. The Council of Ministers takes decisions upon the proposal of the Prime Minister or the respective minister.
3. Meetings of the Council of Ministers are closed. 4. Acts of the Council of Ministers are valid when signed by the Prime Minister and the proposing minister.
5. The Council of Ministers issues decisions and instructions.

— Article 101 —

The Council of Ministers, in cases of necessity and emergency, may issue, under its responsibility, normative acts having the force of law for taking temporary measures. These normative acts are immediately submitted to the Assembly, which is convened within 5 days if it is not in session. These acts lose force retroactively if they are not approved by the Assembly within 45 days.

— Article 102 —

1. The Prime Minister:

a) represents the Council of Ministers and chairs its meetings;
b) outlines and presents the principal directions of general state policy and is responsible for them;
c) assures the implementation of legislation and policies approved by the Council of Ministers;
ç) coordinates and supervises the work of the members of the Council of Minister and other institutions of the central state administration;
d) performs other duties prescribed in the Constitution and the laws.

2. The Prime Minister resolves disagreements between ministers.
3. The Prime Minister, in the exercise of his powers, issues orders.
4. The minister, within the principal directions of general state policy, directs, under his responsibility, actions for which he has powers. The minister, in the exercise of his powers, issues orders and instructions.

— Article 103 —

1. Anyone who has the capacity to be a deputy may be appointed a minister.
2. A minister may not exercise any other state function nor be a director or member of the bodies of profit-making companies.
3. Members of the Council of Ministers enjoy the immunity of a deputy.

— Article 104 —

1. The Prime Minister is entitled to present to the Assembly a motion of confidence for the Council of Ministers. If the motion of confidence is voted by less than half of all the members of the Assembly, the Prime Minister, within 48 hours from the voting of the motion, requests the President of the Republic to dissolve the Assembly.
2. The President dissolves the Assembly within 10 days from the receipt of the request. A request for a motion of confidence may not be presented while a motion of no confidence is being examined according to article 105.
3. The voting of the motion may not take place unless three days have passed since its submission.

— Article 105 —

1. One-fifths of the Members of Parliament is entitled to present for voting to the Assembly a motion of no confidence towards the incumbent Prime Minister, by proposing a new Prime Minister.
2. The Assembly may vote a motion of no confidence towards the Prime Minister only by electing a new Prime Minister with the votes of more than half of all the members of the Assembly.
3. The President of the Republic decrees the dismissal of the incumbent Prime Minister and the appointment of the elected Prime Minister not later than 10 days from the voting of the motion at the Assembly.

— Article 106 —

The Prime Minister and the ministers are obligated to stay in office until the appointment of the new Council of Ministers.

— Article 107 —

1. Public employees apply the law and are in the service of the people.
2. Employees in the public administration are selected through competition, except when the law provides otherwise.
3. Guarantees of tenure and legal treatment of public employees are regulated by law.
