= PT4 =

PT4 or variant may refer to:

- New Horizons PT4, a.k.a. 2014 MT69, a celestial object.
- PT-4, a pre-World War II US Navy PT-boat.
- Prison Tycoon 4: Supermax (2008 videogame)
- PT4, a Para triathlon classification.
