= PT6 (disambiguation) =

PT6 or PT-6 may refer to:

- Pratt & Whitney Canada PT6, a popular turboprop aircraft engine
- Cunningham-Hall PT-6, an American six-seat cabin biplane aircraft of the 1920s
- Nanchang PT-6, export version of the Chinese Nanchang CJ-6 basic trainer aircraft
- Consolidated PT-6, a variant of a two-seat trainer and sports plane of the 1920s and 1930s
- USS PT-6, a pre-World War II PT-boat, see PT boat#History
