= Part VIII of the Albanian Constitution =

Part Eight (Part VIII) of the Constitution of Albania is the eighth of eighteen parts. Titled Constitutional Court, it consists of 11 articles. Together with Part Nine (The Courts), and Part Ten (The Office of the Prosecutor) underwent radical changes in 2016 during the so-called Justice Reform, which were the efforts of lawmakers to fight corruption, organized crime, nepotism in the justice system.

== Constitutional Court ==
— Article 124 —

1. The Constitutional Court settles constitutional disputes and makes the final interpretation of the Constitution.
2. The Constitutional Court is subject only to the Constitution.
3. The Constitutional Court shall have a separate budget, which it administers independently.

— Article 125 —

1. The Constitutional Court shall consist of 9 (nine) members. Three members shall be appointed by the President of the Republic, three members shall be elected by the Assembly and three members shall be elected by the High Court. The members shall be selected among the three first ranked candidates by the Justice Appointments Council, in accordance with the law.
2. The Assembly shall elect the Constitutional Court judges by no less than three-fifths majority of its members. If the Assembly fails to elect the judge within 30 days of the submission of the list of candidates by the Justice Appointment Council, the first ranked candidate in the list shall be deemed appointed.
3. The judges of the Constitutional Court shall hold office for a 9 year mandate without the right to re-appointment.
4. The judges of the Constitutional Court shall have a law degree, at least 15 years of experience as judges, prosecutors, advocates, law professors or lectors, senior employees in the public administration, with a renowned activity in the constitutional, human rights or other areas of law.
5. The judge should not have held political posts in the public administration or leadership positions in a political party in the last past 10 years before running as a candidate. Further criteria and the procedure for the appointment and election of judges of the Constitutional Court shall be regulated by law.
6. The composition of the Constitutional Court shall be renewed every 3 years to one-third thereof, in accordance with the procedure determined by law.
7. The Constitutional Court judge shall continue to stay in office until the appointment of the successor, except for the cases provided for in Article 127, paragraph 1, subparagraph c, ç), d), and dh).

— Article 126 —

The Constitutional Court judge shall enjoy immunity in connection with the opinions expressed and the decisions made in the course of assuming the functions, except where the judge acts based upon personal interests or malice.

— Article 127 —

1. The mandate of Constitutional Court judges shall end, when:

a) Reaching the age of 70 years;
b) The 9 year mandate expires;
c) He/she resigns;
ç) Dismissed in accordance with the provisions of article 128 of the Constitution;
d) Establishing the conditions of ineluctability and incompatibility in assuming the function;
dh) Establishing the fact of incapacity to exercise the duties;

2. The end of the mandate of the Constitutional Court judge shall be declared upon the decision of the Constitutional Court.
3. Where the position of a judge remains vacant, the appointing body shall appoint a new judge, the latter staying in office until the expiry of the mandate of the outgoing judge.

— Article 128 —

1. The Constitutional Court judge shall be disciplinary liable under the law.
2. The disciplinary proceedings against the judge shall be carried out by the Constitutional Court, which decides on his/her dismissal when:

a) It finds serious professional and ethical misconduct which discredit the position and the image of a judge in exercising the mandate;
b) Sentenced by a final court decision for commission of a crime.

3. The Constitutional Court judge shall be suspended from duty by decision of the Constitutional Court when:

a) Upon him/her is imposed the personal security measure of “arrest in prison” or “house arrest” for commission of a criminal offence;
b) He/she obtains the capacity of the defendant for an offence committed intentionally;
c) Disciplinary proceedings being initiated under the law”.

— Article 129 —

The judge of the Constitutional Court starts the duty after he makes an oath in front of the President of the Republic

— Article 130 —

Being a Constitutional Court judge shall not be compatible with any other political, state activity, as well as any other professional activity exercised against payment, except for teaching, academic and scientific activities, in accordance with the law.

— Article 131 —

1. The Constitutional Court decides on:

a) compatibility of the law with the Constitution or with international agreements as provided for in Article 122;
b) compatibility of international agreements with the Constitution, prior to their ratification;
c) compatibility of normative acts of the central and local bodies with the Constitution and international agreements;
ç) conflicts of competencies between powers, as well as between central government and local government;
d) constitutionality of the parties and other political organizations, as well as their activity, according to Article 9 of this Constitution;
dh) dismissal from duty of the President of the Republic and verification of his inability to exercise his functions;
e) the issues bearing a connection to the electability and compliance in assuming the functions of the President of the Republic, MPs, functionaries of bodies foreseen in the Constitution, as well as to the verification of their election.
ë) constitutionality of the referendum and verification of its results;
f) final examination of the complaints of individuals against the acts of the public power or judicial acts impairing the fundamental rights and freedoms guaranteed by the Constitution, after all effective legal means for the protection of those rights have been exhausted, unless provided otherwise by the Constitution.

2. The Constitutional Court shall, when recourse being sought for examining a law on the revision of the Constitution approved by the Assembly according to Article 177, control only the compliance with the procedural requirements foreseen in the Constitution.

— Article 132 —

1.The decisions of the Constitutional Court shall be final and binding for enforcement.
2. The decisions of the Constitutional Court shall enter into force on the day of their publication in the Official Journal. The Constitutional Court may decide that its decision, which has examined the act, gives effect on another date.
3. The dissenting opinion shall be published along with the final decision.

— Article 133 —

1. Acceptance of complaints for adjudication is decided by a number of judges as determined by law.
2. The Constitutional Court makes its final decisions by the majority of all its members, unless otherwise provided for by law.

— Article 134 —

1. Recourse to the Constitutional Court shall be sought upon the request of:

a) President of the Republic;
b) Prime Minister;
c) Not less than one-fifth of the members of Assembly;
ç) People’s Advocate;
d) Head of High State Audit;
dh) Any court, in the event of Article 145, point 2, of this Constitution;
e) Any commissioner established by law for the protection of the fundamental rights and freedoms guaranteed by the Constitution;
ë) High Judicial Council and High Prosecutorial Council;
f) Local governance units;
g) Religious communities’ forums;
gj) Political parties;
h) Organizations;
i) Individuals.

2. The entities provided for in sub-paragraphs d, dh, e, ë, f, g, gj, h, and i of paragraph 1 of this Article may file a request only regarding the issues connected to their interests.
