= Part XVI of the Albanian Constitution =

Part Sixteen (Part XVI) of the Constitution of Albania is the Sixteenth of eighteen parts. Titled Extraordinary Measures, it consists of 7 articles.

== Extraordinary Measures ==
— Article 170 —

1. Extraordinary measures can be taken due to a state of war, state of emergency, or natural disaster and last for as long as these states continue.
2. The principles of the activity of public bodies, as well as the extent of limitations on human rights and freedoms during the period of the existence of situations that require extraordinary measures, are defined by law.
3. The law must define the principles, the areas, and the manner of compensation for losses caused as a result of the limitation of human rights and freedoms during the period in which extraordinary measures are taken.
4. Acts taken as a result of extraordinary measures must be in proportion with the level of risk and must aim to re-establish the conditions for the normal functioning of the state, as soon as possible.
5. During the situations that require extraordinary measures to be taken, none of these acts may be changed: the Constitution, the laws on the election of the Assembly and local government organs, as well as the laws on extraordinary measures.
6. During the implementation period of extraordinary measures, there may not be held elections for local government bodies, there may not be a referendum, and a new President of the Republic may not be elected. The elections for the local government bodies can be held only in those places where the extraordinary measures are not implemented.

— Article 171 —

1. In case of armed aggression against the Republic of Albania, the President of the Republic upon request of the Council of Ministers declares the state of war.
2. In case of external threat, or when a common defense obligation derives from an international agreement, the Assembly, upon proposal of the President of the Republic, declares the state of war and decides on the state of general or partial mobilization or demobilization.

— Article 172 —

1. In the case of paragraph 1 of Article 171, the President of the Republic presents to the Assembly the decree for establishing the state of war within 48 hours from its signing, specifying the rights to be limited.
2. The Assembly immediately reviews and decides with the majority of all its members, upon the decree of the President.

— Article 173 —

1. In case of danger to the constitutional order and to public security, the Assembly, with request of the Council of Ministers, may decide for a state of emergency in one part or the whole territory of the state, which lasts for as long as this danger continues, but not longer than 60 days.
2. Upon establishment of the state of emergency, the intervention of armed forces is done with a decision of the Assembly and only when police forces are not able to restore order.
3. The extension of the term of the state of emergency may be done only with the consent of the Assembly, for each 30 days, for a period of time not longer than 90 days.

— Article 174 —

1. For the prevention or the avoidance of the consequences of natural disasters or technological accidents, the Council of Ministers may decide on the state of natural disaster for a period not longer than 30 days, in one part or in the whole territory of the state.
2. The extension of the state of natural disaster can be done only with the consent of the Assembly.

— Article 175 —

1. During the state of war or state of emergency the rights and freedoms provided for in Articles: 15; 18; 19; 20; 21; 24; 25; 29; 30; 31; 32; 34; 39, paragraph 1; 41, paragraphs 1, 2, 3, and 5; 42; 43; 48; 54; 55 may not be limited.
2. During the state of natural disaster the rights and freedoms provided for in Articles: 37; 38; 41, paragraph 4; 49; 51 may be limited. 3. The acts for declaring the state of war, emergency or natural disaster must specify the rights and freedoms which are limited according to paragraphs 1 and 2 of this Article.

— Article 176 —

When the Assembly cannot be convened during the state of war, the President of the Republic, with the proposal of the Council of Ministers, has the right to issue acts that have the force of the law, which have to be approved by the Assembly in its first meeting.
