= State Supreme Audit (Albania) =

Supreme audit institution of Albania

Kontrolli i Lartë i Shtetit
- Official logo

Agency overview
- Formed: 20 May 1925
- Jurisdiction: Albania
- Headquarters: Tirana
- Agency executive: Chairman, Arben Shehu
- Website: klsh.org.al

The State Supreme Audit (Albanian: Kontrolli i Lartë i Shtetit) is the supreme audit institution of the Republic of Albania, and as such is the highest institution of economic and financial control in the country. As an independent governing body it is subordinated only to the law and the constitution. Its mission is to contribute towards the good management of public finances, by conducting quality audits, reporting on the regularity and the effectiveness of the use of all state financial resources for the benefit of the state and its citizens.

== Reorganization ==
Since the establishment of the institution, the State Supreme Audit has undergone several administrative changes to its organizational structure, subsequently leading to the name of the institution being changed.

- Audit Council (1925–1946)
- Audit Ministry (1946–1959)
- State Audit Commission (1959–1966)
- State Inspectorate (1966–1987)
- State Audit Commission (1987–1992)
- State Supreme Audit (1992–present)

== Auditors ==
No.	Name	Term in office
1	Kol Thaçi	1925
2	Fejzi Alizoti	1925	1926
3	Lac Gera	1926
4	Llambi Aleksi	1927
–	Kol Thaçi	1928	1930
5	Lame Kareco	1930	1931
6	Ekrem Libohova	1931	1933
7	Xhafer Ypi	1933	1937
8	Rrok Gera	1937	1939
9	Yzedin Beshiri	1943	1944
10	Kiço Kasapi	1945	1946
11	Pandi Kristo	1946
12	Shefqet Peçi	1946	1948
13	Spiro Koleka	1949	1950
14	Qazim Kondi	1950
15	Manush Myftiu	1950	1954
–	Shefqet Peçi	1954	1966
–	Spiro Koleka	1966	1970
16	Sulejman Baholli	1970	1978
17	Osman Murati	1978	1982
18	Stefan Papagjoni	1982	1986
19	Enver Halili	1987	1989
–	Manush Myftiu	1989	1990
20	Simon Stefani	1990
21	Ali Kaza	1990	1991
22	Bujar Kolaneci	1991
23	Zyhdi Pepa	1991
24	Alfred Karamuço	1991
25	Ylli Memisha	1991	1992
26	Blerim Çela	1992	1997
27	Mustafa Kërçuku	1997	2004
28	Robert Çeku	2004	2011
29	Bujar Leskaj	2011	2020
30	Arben Shehu	2020	Incumbent
