= Prison Tycoon =

2005 video game

- Developer(s): Virtual Playground
- Publisher(s): ValuSoft
- Engine: Gamebryo
- Platform(s): Windows
- Release: NA: July 21, 2005
- Genre(s): Business simulation game
- Mode(s): Single player

Prison Tycoon is a business simulation computer game developed by Virtual Playground and published by ValuSoft in July 2005. The game puts the user in charge of a prison, with the objectives of keeping the prison running, keeping the staff happy, and keeping the prisoners in line, all while trying to make money.

Users are allowed to choose between a New England prison, a modern U.S. Southwestern-style prison, and a West Coast-style prison modelled after San Quentin.

A sequel, Prison Tycoon 2: Maximum Security, was released on September 8, 2006, followed by Prison Tycoon 3: Lockdown in 2007 and Prison Tycoon 4: Supermax in 2008, then Prison Tycoon: Alcatraz in late 2010. THQ Wireless released a version of Prison Tycoon for the iPhone in May 2009.

== Gameplay ==
The premise of the game is to create a functional prison complete with walls, guard towers, and housing wings, plus dining, exercise, and medical facilities. The objective of the game is ultimately to turn your low-security incarceration facility into a profitable maximum-security prison. Funding is collected by the player through state funding, charitable donations, and inmate labor depending on myriad factors, such as employee satisfaction and inmate happiness and rehabilitation. Players have the option to start with a completely blank slate in a free-play mode or with the basic layout of an existing prison but with several problems that need to be addressed in challenge mode.

The challenges range from rehabilitating a certain number of inmates or reducing the number of riots and fights within the prison, to simply reaching a certain level of security. To create a prison, the player places buildings or walls along a grid system by selecting which building they would like and placing it somewhere within the boundaries of the map. There are over 100 different buildings that can be constructed. Within certain buildings the player can build different rooms, from over 100 to choose from, such as individual cells with multiple beds or solitary confinement cells. Buildings come with appropriate staffing, for example guard towers come with guards already positioned in the tower and medical facilities come with medical staffing.

Once a player has constructed sufficient housing and basic amenities, prisoners begin arriving on buses depending on the capacity of the prison. Prisoners continue to arrive as long as there is sufficient capacity to hold them and depart as they complete their sentences. As the number of inmates increases the prison upgrades to a higher security level, beginning at low security until it becomes a maximum-security prison. With higher levels of security the player has access to more advanced facilities and upgraded walls and guard towers.

Players are able to click on both inmates and staff to get a basic description of their levels of satisfaction, fatigue, productivity, as well as misconduct for prisoners. Clicking on one of these things with the prisoner selected allows players to assign prisoners to cells, jobs, and activities. Players can drag and drop guards to areas of high misconduct or to break up riots which occur within the prison if prisoners become too dissatisfied.

=== Inmates ===
Rioting prisoners being subdued by the guards

The game designers created 96 different-looking inmates capable of over 100 different animations to allow for a varied prison population. Inmates have various meters above their heads which the player can monitor by clicking on the prisoners. They have levels of satisfaction, fatigue, productivity, and misconduct. If inmates do not have activities, such as working out, playing basketball, or performing work, they will become dissatisfied and their misconduct meter will increase. Having high misconduct will result in decreased productivity and an increase in fights and riots breaking out within the prison.

Ultimately, it is important to monitor inmate morale and keep it high to increase profits, as high inmate morale and sufficient holding capacity will result in more inmates arriving. Also, the player has the ability to suggest inmates to the parole board for possible early dismissal. The approval or rejection of a prisoner is based upon the number of fights he has been in, the number of gangs he is affiliated with, and the number of rehabilitation projects he has completed, as well as his misconduct rating.

== Reception ==
Prison Tycoon received generally poor grades from critics. Xplay's Time Stevens gave the game only one star out of five, concluding his review by writing that "Prisons aren't supposed to be fun, so maybe it shouldn't be a surprise that a game about prisons isn't either." GameZone gave the game a score of 5/10, praising the idea and concept but complaining about clunky graphics, dysfunctional camera angles, and lack of instructions. While most players agreed the basic premise was unique and interesting, some common complaints about the game included bad camera angles, lackluster graphics, choppy or slow framerates, annoying music and sound, and limited help for players.

== Sequels ==
=== Maximum Security ===
Prison Tycoon 2: Maximum Security
- Developer(s): Virtual Playground
- Publisher(s): ValuSoft
- Platform(s): Windows
- Release: NA: September 8, 2006
- Genre(s): Business simulation game
- Mode(s): Single player

Prison Tycoon 2: Maximum Security is a business simulation computer game developed by Virtual Playground and published by Valusoft in 2006 as a sequel to Prison Tycoon. Three real-life locations are featured in the game, including Angola (Louisiana State Penitentiary), Leavenworth, KS, and Steilacoom, WA (McNeil Island).

=== Lockdown ===
Prison Tycoon 3: Lockdown
- Developer(s): Virtual Playground
- Publisher(s): ValuSoft
- Platform(s): Windows
- Release: NA: August 1, 2007
- Genre(s): Business simulation game
- Mode(s): Single-player

Prison Tycoon 3: Lockdown is a business simulation computer game for Windows. It was released in 2007 as the third game in the Prison Tycoon series.

Prison Tycoon 3: Lockdown was reviewed by PC Gamer UK, who rated the game 3.8/10.

=== Supermax ===
Prison Tycoon 4: Supermax
- Developer(s): Virtual Playground
- Publisher(s): ValuSoft
- Platform(s): Windows
- Release: NA: August 29, 2008
- Genre(s): Business simulation game
- Mode(s): Single-player

Prison Tycoon 4: Supermax is a business simulation computer game released for Windows in 2008 as the fourth game in the Prison Tycoon series. This version of the game introduced several improvements, including a brand-new graphics engine, advisers, and more control over various aspects of the game, such as the closing/opening of gates, tunnels, and more.

Prison Tycoon 4: Supermax has not been reviewed by many professional critics. IGN's Jimmy Thang gave the game a rating of 2.5/10 and called it "terrible".

=== Alcatraz ===
Prison Tycoon: Alcatraz
- Developer(s): Virtual Playground
- Publisher(s): ValuSoft
- Platform(s): Windows
- Release: NA: September 14, 2010
- Genre(s): Business simulation game
- Mode(s): Single-player

Prison Tycoon: Alcatraz is a business simulation computer game released for Windows in 2010 as the fifth game in the Prison Tycoon series. As with previous installments, the game puts the user in charge of a prison, in this case Alcatraz Island.

Similar to several of its predecessors, Prison Tycoon: Alcatraz was not reviewed by professional critics.

== See also ==
- Private prison
- Prison Architect
