= Your Honour (disambiguation) =

Your Honour is a style of address for judges.

Your Honour or Your Honor may also refer to:

- Your Honour (Indian TV series), a 2000 Indian television series
- Your Honor (2018 TV series), a 2018 South Korean television series
- Your Honor (American TV series), a 2020 American television limited series
- Your Honor (Indian TV series), a 2020 Indian web series
- Your Honor (Russian TV series), a 2021 Russian television series
- Your Honor (2024 TV series), a 2024 South Korean television series
- Your Honor (Brooklyn Nine-Nine), an episode of Brooklyn Nine-Nine
- "Your Honour", a song by Jamaican musician Pluto Shervington

== See also ==
- Yes Your Honour, 2006 Malayalam film
- In Your Honor, a studio 2005 double album by American rock band Foo Fighters
