= Avi Benjamin =

Israeli composer and musician

- אבי בנימין
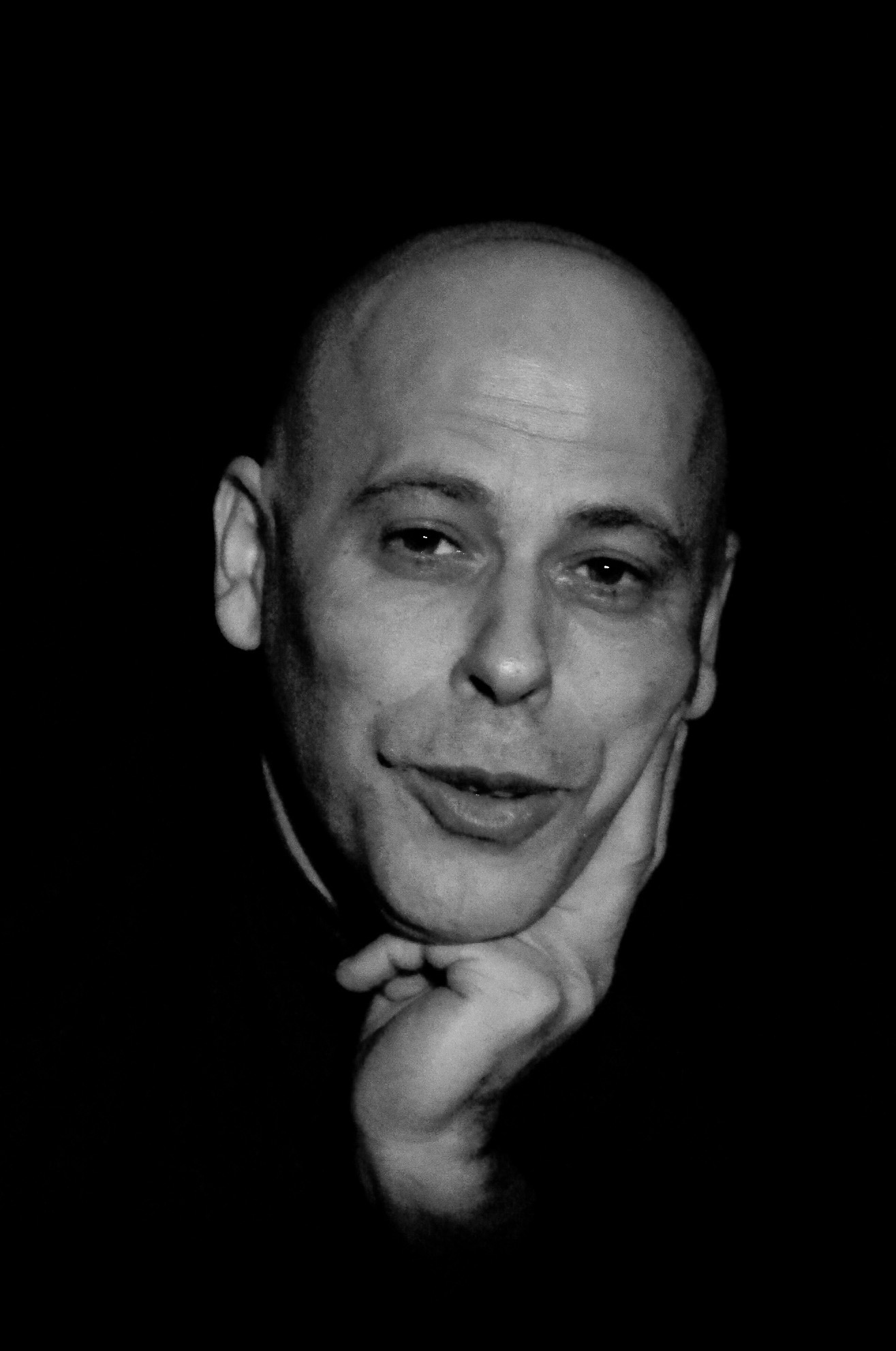
- Born: Avi Nedzvetsky; March 3, 1959

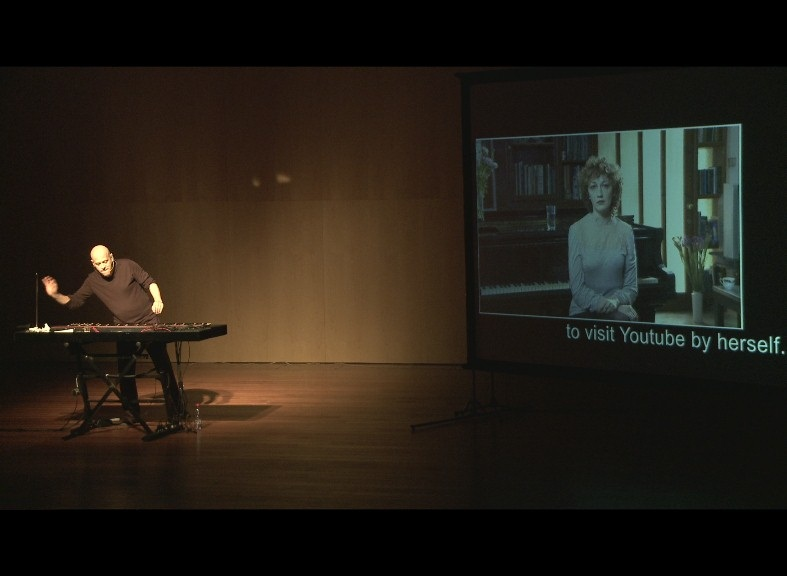
Avi Benjamin performing at his show "Live Soundtracks for Movies That Don't Yet Exist" at Tel Aviv Museum of Art, March 2012. On the screen – actress Evgenia Dodina

Avi Benjamin (Hebrew: אבי בנימין; Russian: Ави Беньямин; born 3 March 1959) is an Israeli composer and performer, musical director of the Israeli Gesher Theater since its foundation in 1991.

== Biography ==
Avi Nedzvetsky (later Benjamin) was born in Tallinn, Estonia. His father was a professor of psychology at the University of Tartu and his mother was a physician. At the age of 4, Benjamin started to learn piano in Tartu, and when he was 15 his family moved to Tallinn, where he continued his studies at the Musical College with the pianist and teacher Renate Goznaya. Benjamin is married to the actress Evgenia Dodina who works at Habima Theater (she met Benjamin when both were working at Gesher). They have a daughter Anna (b. in 1995). Benjamin has also a son Gur (b. in 1985) from his first marriage.

== Music and theater career ==
After graduation he was accepted to the Estonian Academy of Music and Theater. At the academy, Benjamin studied piano under Bruno Lukk (himself a student of Artur Schnabel and Paul Hindemith) and Toivo Nahkur. Among his teachers were pianist Anna Klas and composer Jaan Rääts.

In the mid-70s, in Tallinn, Benjamin became familiar with the contemporary Western music, mostly prohibited in the USSR at that time. Rock 'n' Roll, hard rock, blues, and jazz soon became a part of his life together with classical music. During his studies at the academy, Benjamin performed with the Estonian Philharmonic Orchestra, and following his graduation he became a musical director of the Estonian State Russian Drama Theater in Tallinn.

In the mid 80-s Benjamin moved to Moscow to work as a theater composer. In Moscow, Benjamin composed music mostly for the TYUZ (Young Generation Theater) and the Hermitage Theater. His musical “Goodbye America!” based on the famous children poem “Mister Twister” by Samuil Marshak and staged in TYUZ by director Henrietta Yanovskaya, was named the “Best Show in Moscow” in the 1988-1989 season. He also composed music to the “Journey of Benjamin the Third to the Holy Land” (after the classic Yiddish epic by Mendele Mocher Sforim) for Hermitage Theater. The play translated from Yiddish by the poet Velvl Chernin was directed by Nikolay Sheiko casting Eugene Gerchakov as a main character – the “Jewish Don Quixote” Benjamin the Third. Very soon the performance built up a cult status with the Moscow Jewish community as its premiere coincided with the start of the new wave of Jewish exodus from the Soviet Union. During his time in Moscow Benjamin also became interested in Jewish music and formed a Klezmer band.

In February 1991, Benjamin moved to Israel and eventually settled in Jerusalem. Soon after arrival he was approached by Slava Maltzev and Yevgeny Arye – founders of the Gesher Theater and asked to join a new theater as its “house composer”. At this time he adopted “Benjamin” as his last name as a tribute to his father. His first work for Gesher was a music to the “Dreyfus Case”, which was followed by the “Rosencrantz and Guildenstern Are Dead”, both directed by Yevgeny Arye. In his twenty years as a composer and a conductor with Gesher, Benjamin wrote music to more than 30 plays. In his theatrical work, Benjamin explored and often combined various musical styles: from rock to jazz to klezmer to name a few. In particular, Benjamin composed music to the play “Adam – the Son of Dog” (Hebrew: אדם בן כלב) based on the book of the same name by Yoram Kaniuk (translated in English as “Adam Resurrected”) and directed by Yevgeny Arye. The play, staged in the circus tent especially built for this performance, became the signature of the theater and the basis of documentary “Adam’s Circus" directed by Lihi Hanoch. In 1997, Benjamin was awarded the Meir Margalit Prize for his work with Gesher.

The musical “Devil in Moscow” after the famous classical novel “The Master and Margarita” by Mikhail Bulgakov became another highlight in Benjamin’s theatrical career. In 2001, he won Israeli Theater Award as the best composer for this work. The musical became the most outspoken event of the 2000-2001 theatrical season and its cast included famous Israeli actors Chaim Topol and Sassi Keshet among others.

In addition to his work for Gesher, Benjamin composed music to the play Gebirtig (about the Polish Jewish poet Mordechaj Gebirtig) for the Tel Aviv Yiddishpiel Theater. He also wrote the score to the number of movies – most famous of them Yana's Friends (Hebrew: החברים של יאנה) directed by Arik Kaplun won the Ophir Prize as the best Israeli movie of 1999 and the number of awards on the various film festivals in Israel and abroad. In 2002, the recording company AOC released the collection of two CDs “The Gesher Music” with the music composed and performed by Benjamin for Gesher Theater. In 2003, the Raanana Symphonette Orchestra performed a world premiere of the symphonic suite by Benjamin based on the material for the musical “Devil in Moscow”.

In 2012, Benjamin started a new conceptual music and multimedia project "Soundtracks to the movies that don't yet exist". The project is co-produced by Michael Vaisburd and it combines on-stage performance by Benjamin using the musical instruments of new generation (such as Continuum Fingerboard created by Lippold Haken, Kyma – a sound design system created by Carla Scaletti and Theremin-vox built by its inventor Lev Theremin for Avi Benjamin in 1984 and adapted for this project) with on-screen performers Evgenia Dodina, Michal Weinberg, Neta Shpiegelman, Ilya Mem and Noemi Meylakh and voice-over by Lihi Hanoch, Makiko Ikehara, Noa Koler and others.
