= Efrat Mishori =

Israeli poet, essayist and filmmaker

Efrat Mishori אפרת מישורי
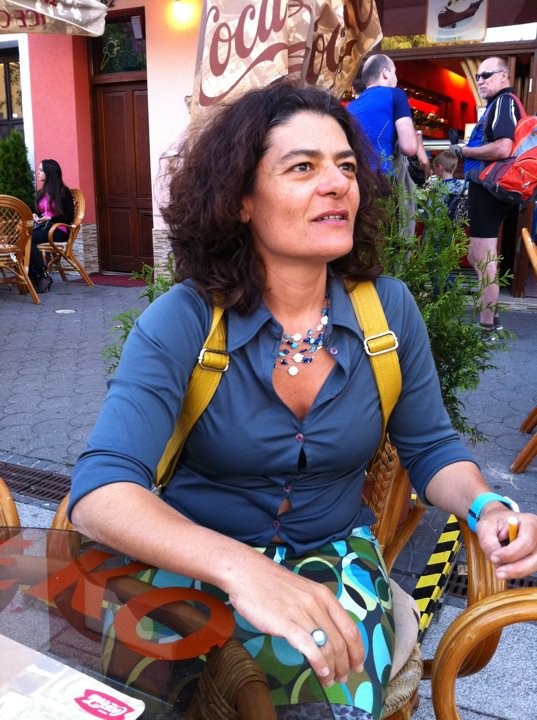
- Born: Tiberias
- Occupations: Poet, writer, filmmaker

Efrat Mishori (née Tsdaka, in Hebrew: אפרת מישורי; born 5 May 1964) is an Israeli poet, essayist, performance artist, and filmmaker. She is the recipient of the Prime Minister's Award (2002) and the Landau Award (2018).

== Biography ==
Mishori (nee Tsdaka) was born in Tiberias. During the 1990s, she worked as an art and literature critic and essayist. She completed her PhD in literature at Tel Aviv University in 2006, with a dissertation entitled "Tel Aviv – Reality or Invention", which combined psychoanalysis and literature, and dealt with representation of places as transition objects for the poet; her work won her the Dov Sadan excellence award.

== Writing ==
Mishori's first published work was a children's book, The Book of Dreams, which came out in 1988. Mishori wrote and illustrated the book. Her first collection of poetry, Poems 1990–1994, was self-published in 1994, won the Ron Adler Foundation award for first-time authors, and was defined by critic Menahem Ben as "one of the most important poetic achievements we've seen in recent years".

Since then, Mishori has published six additional poetry collections. She has won the Hebrew Authors Creativity Award (Prime Minister's Award) in 2002, the Haaretz short story award in 2004, and in 2017, she won the Shlomo Tanai award for her book Married Woman and Single Poems. Her poems and stories have been published in daily papers, magazines, and literary journals.

== Other activities ==
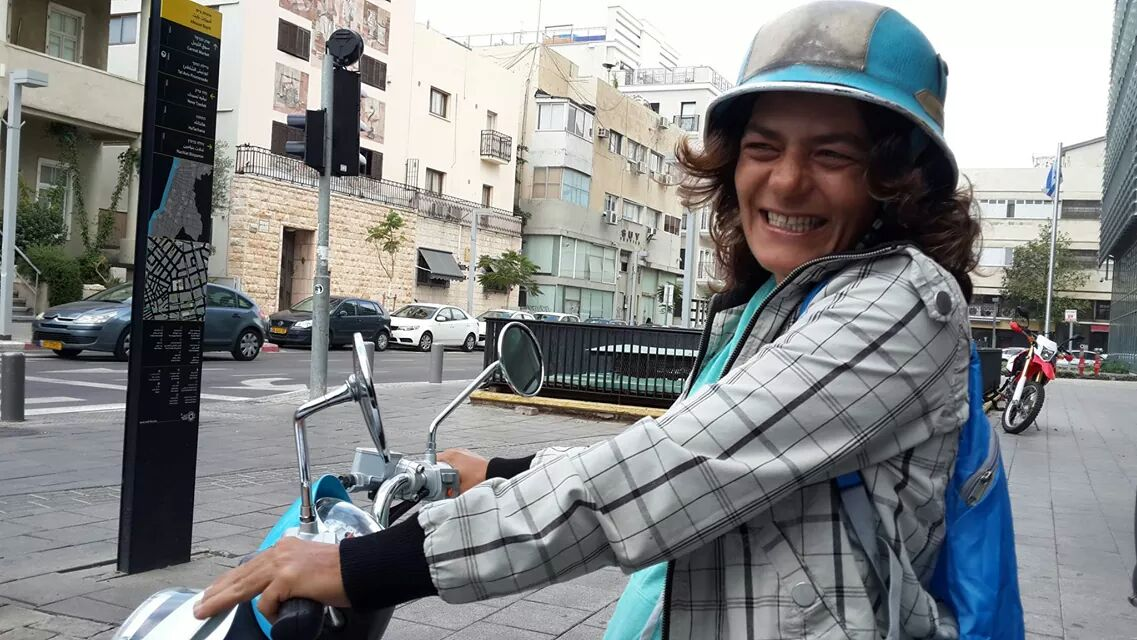

In 1996, Mishori produced and performed the one-woman show "I Am Poetry's Model", based on her poems, and an early staging of spoken word performing in Israel. The show was accompanied by Video art and movement, and was described in the press as "groundbreaking" and "pioneering".

Mishori taught writing and performance at the School of Visual Arts in Jerusalem, led workshops at universities, and was Visiting Author for the Ministry of Education. She also edits poetry collections, and is an editorial board member for the literature journal NanoPoetica. In 2011, Mishori started the literary salon "Theater of the Traveling Text", through which she leads workshops and meetings with women poets, authors and lecturers. She is considered a leader of the "neo-avant-garde" poetry movement in Israel.

Together with the literature and culture magazine Iton 77, Mishori founded "Low Flame 77", a publishing house dedicated to women's poetry, and defined by Mishori as "a laboratory for developing women's poetry". Two books have been published to date, by the poets Tal Cohen Bechor and Revital Mitki.

In 2014, Mishori founded a film production company with filmmaker Dana Goldberg, Gypsycam, for experimental and independent cinema. They produced several short films together. In 2018, they released the feature film Death of a Poetess, starring Evgenia Dodina and Samira Saraya.

In 2018, Mishori received the Landau Arts Award.

== Personal life ==
In 1989 she married Israeli artist Yakov Mishori, whom she divorced in 2014. The two have one son.

Mishori and Dana Goldberg used to be a couple, but separated in 2017. Mishori lives in Tel Aviv.

== Select works ==
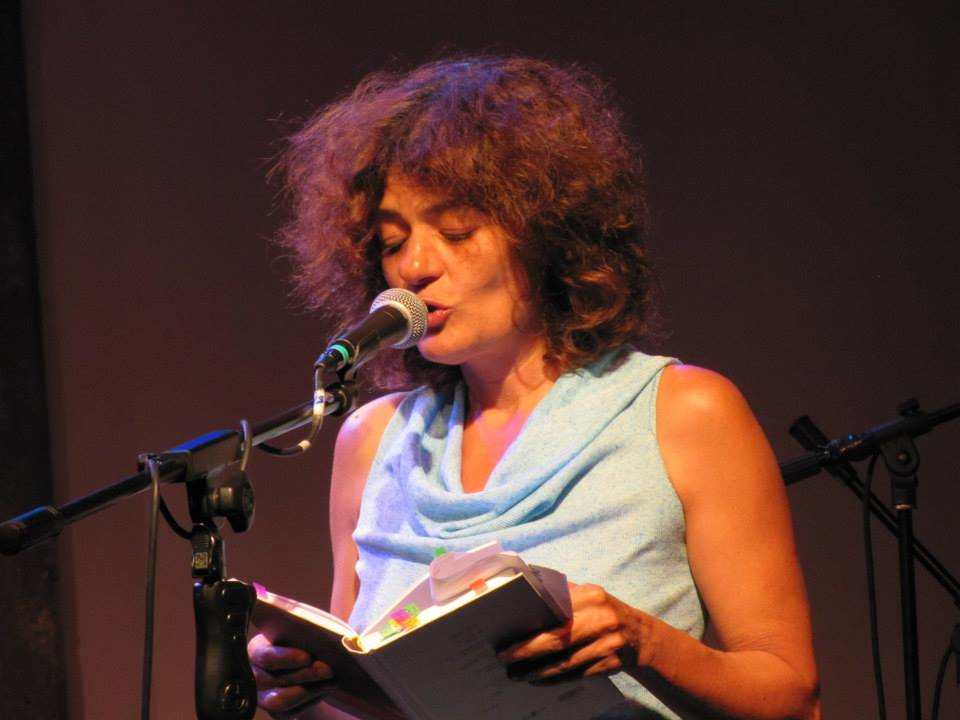
Mishori, reading her poetry

=== Poetry ===
- שירים 1990–1994 Poems 1990–1994
- כרך א: יש לָנוּמָשוּ לָגִיד – שירים 1990–1992 ;כרך ב: הנפש האוקלידית – שירים 92–94
- נשיכות של דגים קטנים Bites of Little Fishes, Even Hoshen, 1999
- הפה הפיזי: שירים The Physical Here, Kibbutz Meuchad Publishing, 2002
- הבוהמה הביתית, הוצאת הקיבוץ המאוחד, 79 עמ Home Boheme, Kibbutz Meuchad Publishing, 2013
- Thinkerbell, Kibbutz Meuchad Publishing, 2015
- אשה נשואה ושירים בודדים, הוצאת הקיבוץ המאוחד, 2019 Married Woman and Single Poems, Kibbutz Meuchad Publishing, 2019
- Избавительница от смерти и изготовители сэндвичей / No nāves glābējiņa un sendviču meistari, Ozolnieki (Latvia), Literature without borders, 2022 (in Russian and Latvian translation)

=== Children's books ===
- ספר החלומות (ירושלים: חורב, תשמ"ח 1988) Book of Dreams, Horev, Jerusalem 1988 (as Efrat Tsdaka)

== See also ==
- List of female film and television directors
- List of LGBT-related films directed by women
