= Kvodo =

- Genre: Crime drama; Legal drama
- Developed by: Shlomo Mashiach; Roni Ninio; Ohad Knoller; Izhar Harlev; Lee Gilat; Esther Namdar Tamam
- Starring: Yoram Hattab; Erez Oved; Alma Dishi; Ilanit Ben-Yaakov; Jetta Monte; Sofi Tsedaka; Hisham Sulliman; Lucy Aharish; Tom Hagi; Danny Steg; Agam Shuster; Evgenia Dodina; Nimrod Hochberg; Uriah Horesh; Inbal Bibi
- Music by: Avi Binyamin; Irad Eshel
- Country of origin: Israel
- Original language: Hebrew
- No. of seasons: 2
- No. of episodes: 22

Production
- Executive producer: Ram Landes
- Producer: Eran Kotzki
- Cinematography: Ofer Yanuv; Gil Ezrachi
- Editors: Ram Landes; Rafael Levin; Ayala Bengad
- Running time: 40 minutes
- Production company: Koda Communications

Original release
- Network: yes
- Release: 2017 – 2019

Related
- Your Honor (2020-2023); Your Honor (2020–2021); Your Honor (2021); Your Honor (2024)

Kvodo (Hebrew: כבודו, His Honor) is an Israeli drama television series created by Shlomo Mashiach and Roni Ninio. A crime and legal drama, the series follows the story of a judge who engages in criminal and unethical behavior to protect his son. It has been internationally adapted into numerous remakes.

== Premise ==
Micha Alkobi is a judge in Beersheba who serves on the city's Magistrate Court and is hoping for a promotion to the District Court. When his 17-year-old son Shai tells him that he hit a motorcyclist in a traffic accident and fled the scene, Alkobi demands that Shai turn himself in. However, he changes his mind after discovering that the man Shai injured is Asaf Ben Attar, who is from a notorious local crime family. Attar survived the crash but is hospitalized and in a coma. Fearing for the safety of his son if he were to be publicly identified as the person responsible, Alkobi engages in illegal behavior, mixes up his friend, a military officer, in his activities, and potentially condemns an innocent person to death to protect Shai.

== Cast and characters ==
- Yoram Hattab as Micha Alkobi, a judge struggling to protect his son.
- Erez Oved as Shai Alkobi, Micha's son who is involved in a hit and run which severely injured the son of a local crime boss.
- Alma Dishi as Yael Ben-Moshe, a young and inexperienced lawyer who was Micha's trainee and whom he involves in the case.
- Ilanit Ben-Yaakov as Chanit Rofos, a senior police official who is in charge of investigating the crash.
- Jetta Monte as Sarah Blum, Micha's mother-in-law and a retired Supreme Court judge who attempts to find out what Micha is hiding.
- Sofi Tsedaka as Amalia Alkobi, Micha's wife and Shai's mother.
- Hisham Sulliman as Khaled Abu Salam, a Bedouin Lieutenant Colonel in the Israel Defense Forces and close friend of Micha who becomes mixed up in the case.
- Lucy Aharish as Nura Abu Salam, Khaled's wife.
- Tom Hagi as Udi Ben Attar, a son of the Attar crime family managing its activities while his father is serving a prison sentence.
- Danny Steg as Aryeh Ben Attar, the imprisoned patriarch of the Attar crime family.
- Agam Shuster as Gabi, Shay's physical education teacher for whom he develops romantic feelings.
- Liran David as Asaf Ben Attar, the son of the Attar crime family injured by Shai Alkobi.

== International remakes ==
The premise of the series proved popular with production companies internationally and numerous remakes of the series across different countries were subsequently created. It became the most successful Israeli television export since BeTipul. Commenting on the show's international success, series creator Shlomo Mashiah was quoted in a 2025 Haaretz article as saying "from the start, I felt I had a strong idea in my hands. But only now, after so many remakes in so many different countries, do I truly understand that this story works everywhere: that it interests people of every religion, race, gender and nationality."

In 2020, the American series Your Honor, starring Bryan Cranston, aired. This was followed up with a Russian version starring Oleg Menshikov, an Indian version starring Jimmy Sheirgill, and a South Korean version starring Son Hyun-joo. In addition, a joint German-Austrian remake of the show was produced. Additional remakes were produced in Italy, France, Spain, and Turkey. In 2022, a Croatian production company signed an option agreement to develop a version of the show which would take place across the Balkan countries. As of 2025, two remakes were in production in Hong Kong and Ukraine, with the Hong Kong version expected to be uniquely action-packed compared to other adaptations, and another two remakes were in development. The Hong Kong adaptation, titled Justice Is Mine, was released in September 2025.
