= Samira Saraya =

Palestinian-Israeli actor and artist

- سميرة سرايا
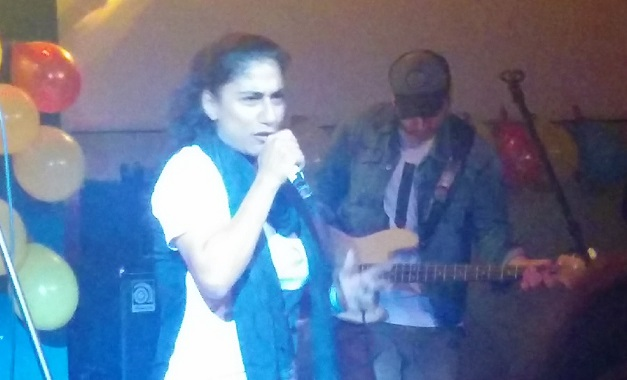
- Saraya in 2017
- Citizenship: Israeli
- Occupations: Actor, filmmaker, rapper
- Notable work: Death of a Poetess
- Television: Minimum Wage (30 ש"ח לשעה); She Has It (יש לה את זה)

Samira Saraya (Arabic: سميرة سرايا; born December 15, 1975) is a Palestinian-Israeli film, television and theater actor, filmmaker, poet, rapper and spoken word artist.

== Biography ==
=== Beginnings ===
Saraya was born in Haifa, to Nimr and Subahiya Saraya. She is the 11th of their 13 children.

At age 19, Saraya moved to Jerusalem to study nursing at the Hebrew University. She began her nursing career at Ichilov hospital in Tel Aviv in the oncology-hematology ward. After working in several different positions at the hospital, including training positions, she began teaching at the Sheinbein nursing college, and managed a private immunotherapy clinic.

=== Film and television ===
Saraya displayed talent and passion for acting from a young age, when she would "put on shows" for her family. But it was only in 1997, in her early twenties, that she got her first real taste of acting, when she participated in an acting workshop in a community center in Lod. The following year, Saraya moved to Tel Aviv and got involved in the fringe performance scene, through which she started performing in various styles, including drag. It was in this context that she discovered her ability to rap and worked the genre into her performances. During this period, she had not yet developed performing into a career, and made her living as a nurse.

In 2008, Saraya made her first film appearance, in the short Gevald. But her real breakthrough arrived in 2011, when she got one of the leading roles in the television series Minimum Wage. She played Amal, one of three work-weary cleaning women. The show was a success, and won Israeli Academy of Film and Television awards for Best Drama and Best Directing in 2012, success that continued into the second season, which aired in 2014.

Saraya starred in Shira Geffen's 2014 film Self Made as Nadine, alongside Sarah Adler. The film provides a mirror-image of a Jewish Israeli woman and a Palestinian woman from the occupied territories, who gradually switch places. Saraya traveled with the film to international film festivals, including Cannes International Film Festival, and the India Women's Film Festival. In 2017, Saraya played the role of Rauda in Shaby Gabizon's film, Longing.

Her performance in Dana Goldberg and Efrat Mishori's 2017 film, Death of a Poetess, won Saraya the Best Actress Award at the Jerusalem Film Festival. The film tracks two simultaneous timelines, following Yasmine (Saraya), a nurse from Jaffa, and the last day in the life of Lena Sadeh (Evgenia Dodina), a world-renowned brain researcher, whose paths cross tragically. Saraya improvised the scenes in which her character was under police interrogation, a performance for which she reaped high praise from reviewers.

Saraya has also played guest roles in series such as Fauda and Sirens, multiple student films, and in 2018, appeared in a German-Israeli experimental film, The Valley of the Cross. Filmed in Germany, the film is the story of a lesbian love affair between two women in 1920s Palestine. Also in 2018, Saraya got the supporting role of Hudna on the hit television She Has It, which has been greenlighted for a second season. In Out, a short film by Alon Sahar that premiered in the 2018 edition of Locarno Film Festival, Saraya played Rouda, a Palestinian mother whose house is invaded by IDF soldiers. The film was later in the middle of a controversy towards its premiere in Haifa Film Festival following culture minister Miri Regev's threat to nix its funds. It ultimately screened there and won the first place.

In June 2015, Saraya won the best screenplay award at the Tel Aviv LGBT film festival, TLVFest.

In 2016, she enrolled in the Tel Aviv University film school, planning to write and direct her first feature.

Saraya's directorial debut was with the short film Polygraph. The film's premier was in the 2020 edition of the LGBT film festival, TLVFest. She had previously won the short screenplay competition for Polygraph in the 2017 festival, receiving a grant from Gesher Foundation to produce and shoot the film. Polygraph stars Saraya and Hadas Yaron in the lead roles.

=== Theater and stage ===
Saraya is the first Palestinian drag king, performing under the stage name "Samimo". She began performing at parties and events of the radical queer community in 2003. Her first major stage role was in the play The Silwan Peacock (2012), in which she plays a young Arab woman who is forced to navigate among the conflicting interests of the state, the Israeli settlement, and the local Arab population regarding a site that becomes an archaeological dig. She received a special commendation from the jury at the Acre Festival. The play – a Golden Hedgehog award winner, and critic-favorite – is still running as of 2018.

Saraya appeared in several other stage productions at the Acre festival, including Ran Bechor's Hutzbama, which won Best Play. In 2016 she played a lead role in the avant-garde production Schreber, which also won Best Play and showed all around the country.

As a rap and spoken word artist, Saraya performs both solo and in collaboration with other artists, including Tamer Nafar, System Ali, and others.

=== Activism ===
Saraya's political and social activism began with the queer-anarchist group Black Laundry, and she was one of the founders of Aswat, the queer Arab women's group, in which she worked to change the perception of the LGBT community in Arab society. She was also a part of Tel Aviv's queer political scene in the early 2000s, and one of the organizers of the Queerhana collective, which held non-profit parties for the community, in order to provide marginalized LGBT persons an alternative to the commercial, apolitical lines. The Queerhana parties and activism were documented in the film Nation Monsters and Super Queers, in which Saraya participated.

In December 2018, Saraya appeared on the cover of GenderTuck magazine, which featured an interview with her in which she discusses the edition's topic – family – analyzing the concepts and meaning of birth family and chosen family.

On May 7, 2019, Saraya co-hosted the joint Israeli-Palestinian Memorial Day ceremony (he), which is conducted by Combatants for Peace. Thousands participated in the ceremony, including several hundred Palestinians from the West Bank who were allowed to enter Israel only by a High Court ruling; the event was also protested by several hundred right-wing activists, who shouted threats and disparagements at the participants.

== Filmography ==
Year	Title	Role	Comments
2023	The Milky Way	Manar	
2020	Polygraph	Yasmine	Short film
2019	Zot Vezoti	Darel	Television series, 1 episode
2018	Out	Rauda	Short film
2018	She Has It	Hudna	Television series
2018	Fauda		Television series, episode 2.6
2018	The Valley of the Cross		Experimental film
2017	Death of a Poetess	Yasmine	Feature film
2017	Longing	Rauda	Feature film
2016	Nation Monsters and Super Queers	Herself	Documentary film
2014	Self Made	Nadine Nasrallah	Feature film
2012–2014	Minimum Wage	Amal	Television series
2009	City of Borders	Herself	Documentary film
2009	Gevald	Samira	Short film

== Theater ==
Year	Title	Role	Comments
2016	Schreber	The Nurse	Best Play award, Acre Festival Golden Hedgehog (Best Supporting Actress)
2014	Salim, Salim		Best Play award, Acre Festival
2013	Hutzbama		Most Daring Play, Best Set, Acre Festival
2012	The Silwan Peacock	Amal	Special Commendation for Acting, Acre Festival; Golden Hedgehog (Best Supporting Actress)

== Awards ==
- 2020 – Honorable mention, TLVFest Israeli Short Film Competition, Polygraph
- 2019 – Best Student Film award at the Haifa International Film Festival; longlist for Israeli Academy of Film award for Best Short Film, Out .
- 2017 – TLVFest Short Scripts competition, in association with Gesher Foundation, Polygraph
- 2017 – Golden Hedgehog Best Supporting Actress Award, Schreber
- 2017 – Best Actress Award, Jerusalem Film Festival, Death of a Poetess
- 2015 – Golden Hedgehog Best Supporting Actress Award, Silwan Peacock
- 2015 – Nominations for two media awards at TLVFest for promoting LGBT visibility
- 2012 – Special commendation for unique acting, Acre festival, Silwan Peacock
