= Death of a Poetess =

2017 film by Efrat Mishori and Dana Goldberg

- Directed by: Dana Goldberg; Efrat Mishori
- Screenplay by: Efrat Mishori; Dana Goldberg
- Produced by: Dana Goldberg
- Starring: Evgenia Dodina; Samira Saraya
- Cinematography: Asi Oren; Irit Sharvit
- Edited by: Katia Shepeliavaya
- Release date: July 14, 2017 (Jerusalem Film Festival)
- Running time: 77 minutes
- Country: Israel
- Languages: Hebrew, Arabic

Death of a Poetess is a 2017 Israeli film, directed and written by Efrat Mishori and Dana Goldberg. The lead roles in the film are played by Evgenia Dodina and Samira Saraya. The film premiered at the 2017 Jerusalem Film Festival.

== Plot summary ==
The film is in black-and-white, proceeding along two timelines that meet at the film's ending.

The first timeline follows Leni Sadeh (Evgenia Dodina), a world-renowned researcher, as she completes errand after errand, with a seeming sense of urgency – she goes to the hair salon, picks up a bathrobe she ordered, meets with a publisher at a cafe to give him a manuscript.

In parallel, Yasmine Nasser (Samira Saraya) is being interrogated at a police station. Yasmine is facing the camera/audience, and the interrogator is only heard, off-camera, with increasing intensity. Yasmine is a nurse at an elder-care facility, and her story is revealed in the course of the interrogation: She left her home to supposedly go to work the night shift, but ended up at a beach-front bar, where she met Leni in a fraught pickup scene. The two women share their respective despairs – Leni has an unrelenting sense of regret about someone she won't talk about, and Yasmine feels trapped by her role as wife and mother, which is not her desire but rather the societal expectation of her.

The encounter between the two women ends in Leni's death, which in hindsight it seems was the point of her entire day of arranging her affairs. However, the interrogator refuses to accept that Yasmine – who does not live up to his expectations as a wife and mother, nor as an Arab woman – is not responsible for the death of the respected academic. He continues to harass and threaten her, until she breaks down and takes responsibility for the death.

The film includes poetry by Mishori, and both of the film's main characters are unpublished poets.

== Reception ==
In Israel, the film received mixed reviews, dealing primarily with the structure of the film and the unconventional filming techniques. Erez Dvora, in a ynet review, praised the film's daring and dramatic peaks, though he thought the plot development towards the end was out of sync with the rest of the film. He had high praise for the performances of both lead actresses, in particular for Saraya's improvisational skills. Uri Klein, however, writing for Ha'aretz, felt that the film had a "strained" quality, and faltered at times. He also had high praise for Saraya and Dodina.

In her Hollywood Reporter review, Deborah Young commended the film as "a beautiful example of how a memorable film can be made on a shoestring". She especially approved of the treatment of Saraya's character, as well as her acting and poetry.

== Awards ==
Saraya won the Best Actress award at the Jerusalem Film Festival for her portrayal of Yasmine Nasser in the film.

On January 9, 2018 it was announced that the film was accepted for screening at the Göteborg Film Festival in Sweden, Scandinavia's largest film festival, where the film held its international premier, in the Ingmar Bergman section of the festival.

Year	Award	Category	Nominee	Result
2018	Göteborg Film Festival	Best International Debut	Dana Goldberg and Efrat Mishori	Nominated
2018	UK Jewish Film Festival	Best Screenplay	Dana Goldberg and Efrat Mishori	Won
2017	Jerusalem Film Festival	Best Actress	Samira Saraya	Won
2017	Jerusalem Film Festival	Best Israeli Feature	Dana Goldberg and Efrat Mishori	Nominated

== See also ==
- List of LGBT-related films directed by women
