= Evgenia Dodina =

Israeli actress of Belarusian origin

- יבגניה דודינה
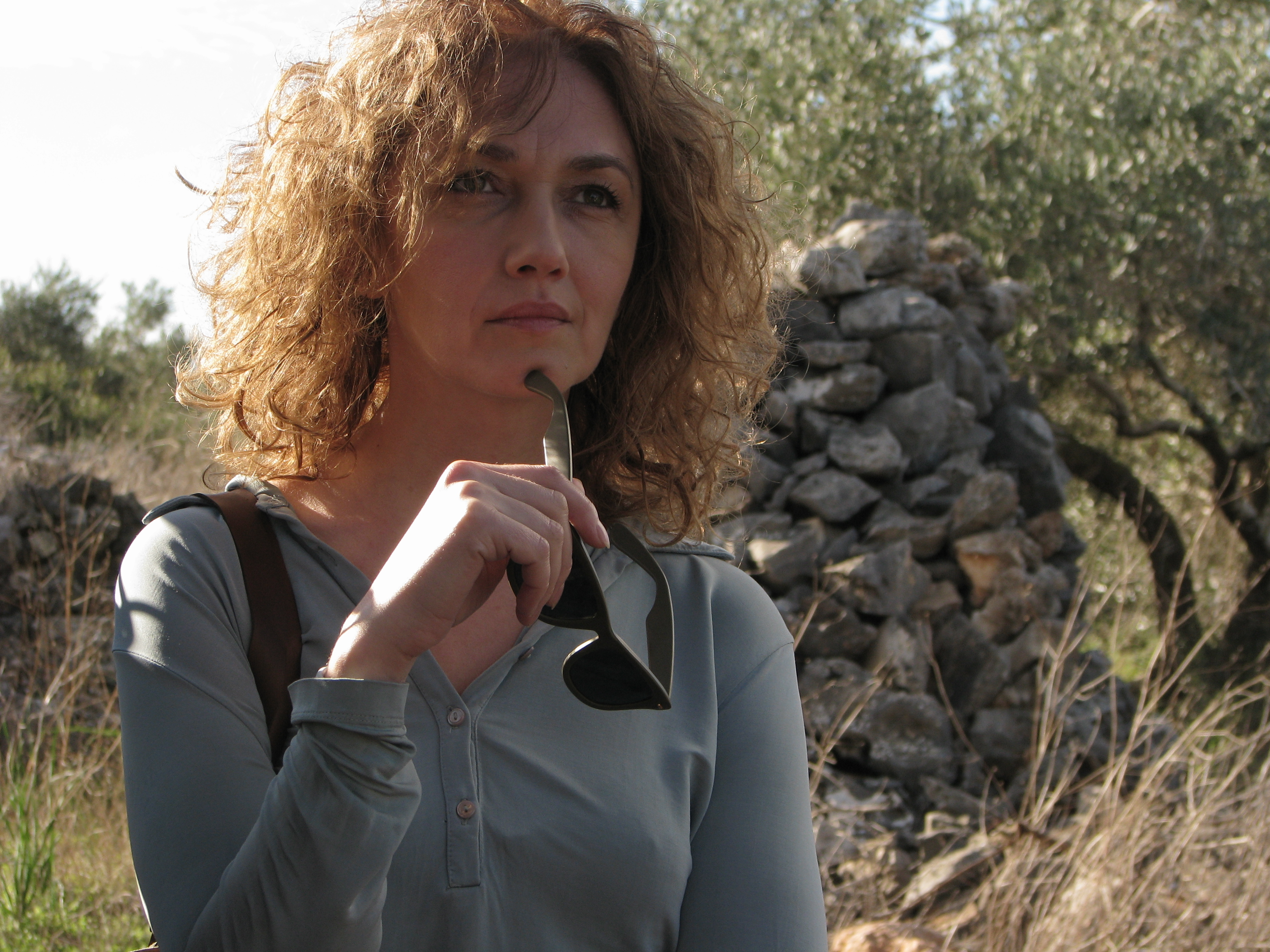
- Evgenia Dodina
- Born: 10 December 1964 (age 61); Mogilev, Soviet Union
- Occupation: Actress
- Years active: 1987-present

Evgenia (Zhenya) Dodina (in Belarusian: Яўгенія Барысаўна Додзіна; Hebrew: יבגניה דודינה; born December 10, 1964) is an Israeli theater, film, and television actress, originally from Soviet Belarus. After meeting director Yevgeny Aryeh at the Mayakovsky Theater in Moscow, she immigrated to Israel and became a founding member of the Gesher Theater.

Dodina has appeared in numerous stage productions, films, and television series in Israel and abroad, and has received multiple awards for her performances. She is known for her linguistic versatility, having performed in Hebrew, Russian, German, English, Polish, and Dutch.

In 2026, the Israeli Academy of Film and Television awarded her the Ophir Award for Best Actress for Mama.

== Biography ==
Dodina was born in Mogilev, in Soviet Belarus (now Belarus), to a father who was a teacher and a mother who was a pediatrician. She studied acting at the State Academy of Arts in Moscow. After graduating, she joined the Mayakovsky Theater, where she met Yevgeny Aryeh. Their collaboration led her to immigrate to Israel in the early 1990s, joining Aryeh and a group of actors to establish the Gesher Theater. She quickly gained recognition for her talent.

== Theater career ==
Upon her arrival in Israel, Dodina began performing at the Gesher Theater, despite not initially speaking Hebrew. She appeared in productions such as Rosencrantz and Guildenstern Are Dead (1992), A Midsummer Night’s Dream (2001, Israeli Theater Award for Actress of the Year), The Slave (2002), Medea (2005), and The Cherry Orchard (2006).

She later joined the Habima National Theater, where she starred in plays including Little Eyolf, A Track to Damascus, Anna Karenina, A Simple Story (2016), A Streetcar Named Desire, and Three Sisters. In 2012, she performed in Persona, a co-production between Habima and Munich’s Residence Theatre.

From 2020 to 2024, Dodina was a permanent ensemble member at the Staatstheater Stuttgart in Germany. Upon returning to Israel, she starred as Richard in a 2023 Gesher Theater production of Richard III, directed by Itay Tiran.

== Film and Television Career ==
Dodina has acted in over 50 films and television series. She appeared in four Ophir Awards-winning films: Saint Clara (1996), Circus Palestine (1998), Nina's Tragedies (2004), and several award-winning TV productions including A Touch Away Rehearsals (2020).

She has collaborated with prominent Israeli directors such as Ari Folman, Samuel Maoz, and Hagai Levi. In 2003, she portrayed legendary actress Hanna Rovina in the TV film Was or Wasn't, earning Best Actress at the Warsaw Jewish Film Festival. She won Best Actress at the Haifa International Film Festival for Invisible (2011).

In 2016, she appeared in One Week and a Day and the short film Anna, both awarded at the Cannes Film Festival. In 2019, she played Tatiana, Villanelle’s mother, in the BBC hit series Killing Eve. Other international credits include The Attack (2012), and In Times of Fading Light (2017).

== Personal life ==
Dodina is married to Israeli musician and composer Avi Benjamin. Their daughter, Anna Benjamin Nedzvetzki, is an actress and pianist.

== Awards and recognition ==
- 2026 - Best Actress, Ophir Award, for Mama
- 2017 – Best Actress, Short Shorts Film Festival, Tokyo, for Anna
- 2016 – Seymour Cassel Award, One Week and a Day
- 2011 – Best Actress, Haifa International Film Festival, for Invisible
- 2010 – Honorary doctorate, Tel Aviv University
- 2010 – Star on Israeli Walk of Fame (Haifa Film Festival)
- 2009 – Torch lighter at Israel’s Independence Day ceremony
- 2005 – Klatzkin Israeli-American Fund Award recipient
- 2003 – Israeli Theater Award, Actress of the Year, for The Slave
- 2003 – Best Actress, Warsaw Jewish Film Festival, for Snow Paper
- 2001 – Israeli Theater Award, Actress of the Year, for A Midsummer Night’s Dream
- 1998 – Rosenblum Prize for Excellence in the Performing Arts

== Filmography ==
Year	Title	Type	Role	Director	Notes
2025	Houses	Film	–	Veronica Nicole Tetenbaum	nominated for Teddy award for Best at the 75th International Film Festival
2024	Etty Hillesum	TV Series	–	Hagai Levi	To be released 2025
2024	Mama	Film	–	Or Sinai	To be released 2025
2024	Unconditional	TV Series -	-	Jonathan Gurfinkel	To be released 2025
2023	Sovietzka	TV Series	Ella Goldenberg	Anat Stalinsky	Kan 11
2023	The Most Beautiful Day	Short Film	-	Shira Meishar	
2022	Munich Games	TV Series	-	Philipp Kadelbach	Prime Video
2020	Killing Eve	TV Series	Tatiana	–	BBC
2020	Rehearsals	TV Series	Vera Kokrin	Boaz Frenkel	Kan 11
2019	Parquet	Film	–	Aleksandr Mindadze	
2019	Your Honor	TV Series	–	Ronni Ninio	
2018	Virgins	Film	Irena/Famous actress	Keren Ben Refeal	Nomination - Ophir Award for Best Supporting Actress|
2017	A Perfect Day for Swimming	Film	-	Shira Porat	
2017	Death of a Poetess	Film	–	Dana Goldberg	
2017	Home Made	Short Film	–	Shira Meishar	
2017	In Times of Fading Light (In Zeiten des abnehmenden Lichts)	Film	–	Matti Geschonneck	Constantin Films
2016	Past Life	Film	–	Avi Nesher	
2016	One Another	Short Film	–	Dasha Sherman	
2016	Anna	Short Film	–	Or Sinai	
2016	One Week and a Day	Film	–	Asaph Polonsky	Cannes Award
2012	The Attack	Film	–	Ziad Doueiri	
2011	Dr Pomerantz	Film	–	Assi Dayan	–
2011	Silver Fox of Felicia T	Film	–	Edward Elter	
2011	Invisible	Film	–	Michal Aviad	
2008	There were nights	Film	–	Roni Ninio	
2008	Adam Resurrected	Film	–	Paul Schrader	July August Productions and 3L Filmproduktion
2008	The Naked Truth	TV Series	–	Uri Barabash	
2006	Love and Dance	Film	–	Eitan Anner	
2006	Letters to America	Film	–	Hanan Peled	
2006	Parashat Hashvua	TV Series	–	Rani Blaire	
2006	A Touch Away	TV Series	–	Roni Ninio	
2003	Snow Paper	TV Film	–	Lena Chaplin, Slava Chaplin	
2003	Nina's Tragedies	Film	–	Savi Gabizon	
2001	Made in Israel	Film	–	Ari Folman	
2000	Total Eclipse	Film	–	Samuel Maoz	
1999	Circus Palestina	Film	–	Eyal Halfon	
1998	Detective in Jerusalem	Mini Series	–	Uri Rosenwaks	
1997	Ga'Ntila	Film	–	Agor Shif	
1997	Game Over	Film	–	Yoni Darmon	
1997	Bat Yam- New York	TV Series	–	Yosi Madmoni, David Ofek	
1996	Saint Clara	Film	–	Ari Folman, Uri Sivan	Ophir Award winner
1996	A Story of Lovers	Film	–	Isaac Zepel Yeshurun	
1995	Siton	Tv Series	–	Uri Barabash	
1994	Scar	Film	–	Haim Bozaglo	
1993	Adam's Circus	Film	–	Lihi Hanoch	.

== Theater ==
Year	Play	Theater	Director	Character
2025	The Souls	Gesher Theater	Itai Tiran	Marina
2023	Richard III	Gesher Theater	Itai Tiran	Richard
2023	The Tempest	The Staatstheater Stuttgart	Burkhard C. Kosminski	Caliban
2023	DER GUTE MENSCH VON SEZUAN	The Staatstheater Stuttgart	Tina Lanik	Die Witwe Shin
2022	VERBRENNUNGEN	The Staatstheater Stuttgart	Burkhard C. Kosminski	Nawal
2021	SIEBZEHN SKIZZEN AUS DER DUNKELHEIT	The Staatstheater Stuttgart	Tina Lanik	Vicktor
2020	The Visit of the Old Lady	The Staatstheater Stuttgart	Burkhard C. Kosminski	Clara
2018	VOGEL	The Staatstheater Stuttgart	Burkhard C. Kosminski	Lea
2017	Three Sisters	Habima Theater	Hanan Snir	Irina
2016	A Simple Story	Habima Theater	Shir Goldberg	Tzirel
2015	A Street Car Named Desire	Habima Theater	Ilan Ronen	Blanche
2015	Oedipus Rex	Habima Theater	Hanan Snir	Jocasta
2014	Our Class	Habima Theater	Hanan Snir	Mariana
2013	A Man Doesn’t Just Die	Habima Theater	Shir Goldberg	Fradel
2012	Persona	Co-production: Habima Theater & Residenz Theater Munich	Amelie Niermeyer	Elizabeth / Alma
2009	A Track to Damascus	Habima Theater	Ilan Ronen	Sarah
2008	Little Eyolf	Habima Theater	Hanan Snir	Rita
2007	Anna Karenina	Habima Theater	Ilan Ronen	Anna Karenina
2006	Cherry Orchard	Gesher Theater	Yevgeny Aryeh	Ranevskaya
2005	Medea	Gesher Theater	Lena Kreindlin	Medea
2004	The Marriage of Figaro	Gesher Theater	Yevgeny Aryeh	Cherubino
2003	Shosha	Gesher Theater	Yevgeny Aryeh	Betty Slonim
2002	The Slave	Gesher Theater	Yevgeny Aryeh	Vanda/Sarah
2001	A Midsummer Night's Dream	Gesher Theater	Yevgeny Aryeh	Puck
2000	Mr. Brink	Gesher Theater	Yevgeny Aryeh	Aunt Demetria
1999	Eating	Gesher Theater	Yevgeny Aryeh	Isabel
1999	Intrigue and Love	Gesher Theater	Leander Haubmann	Lady Milford
1997	Three Sisters	Gesher Theater	Yevgeny Aryeh	Masha
1996	The City	Gesher Theater	Yevgeny Aryeh	Basia / little Babel
1995	Tartuffe	Gesher Theater	Yevgeny Aryeh	Dorina
1994	The Lower Depths	Gesher Theater	Yevgeny Aryeh	Natasha
1993	Adam Resurrected	Gesher Theater	Yevgeny Aryeh	Jeny / Gretchen
1992	Idiot	Gesher Theater	Yevgeny Aryeh	Aglaya
1992	The Cabal of Hypocrites	Gesher Theater	Yevgeny Aryeh	Armand
1991	Dreyfus Affair	Gesher Theater	Yevgeny Aryeh	Miriam
1991	Rosencrantz and Guildenstern Are Dead	Gesher Theater	Yevgeny Aryeh	Ophelia
