= Alice (2012 film) =

2012 drama film by Dana Goldberg

- Hebrew: אליס
- Directed by: Dana Goldberg
- Screenplay by: Dana Goldberg
- Starring: Ilanit Ben-Yaakov; Daria Shezaf; Neta Bar-Rafael
- Edited by: Hadara Oren
- Release dates: July 9, 2012 (Jerusalem Film Festival); June 27, 2013 (cinemas)
- Running time: 82 minutes
- Country: Israel
- Language: Hebrew

Alice (Hebrew: אליס) is a 2012 Israeli drama film, written and directed by Dana Goldberg, her debut feature film. The film received three awards at the Jerusalem Film Festival: Honorable Mention for Best Feature Film, Best Screenplay, and Best Actress, awarded to Ilanit Ben Yaakov. It also won an Honorable Mention for a Feature Narrative Film at the Rehovot International Women's Film Festival.

== Plot synopsis ==
38-year-old Alice (Ilanit Ben-Yaakov) passes her days in sleep. Her night shift work at a residential rehabilitation school gives her an easy excuse, covering up her emotional erosion and numbness. Her husband, Yigal (Haim Zanati), feels upset and lonely because of her withdrawal, and his anger mounts. Eli (Itay Naveh), her 9-year-old son, is desperate for her love. In the school live about 30 girls who suffered from emotional breakdowns. Alice avoids communication with them and is careful to fulfill her basic duties: dispensing medication, overseeing meals, and managing sleep and shower schedules. After the lights are out, she meets Yoel (Amos Shuv), her lover, in her tiny room in the staff area. On the narrow single-bed, her passion awakens for another life, the one that might have been. A challenge by one of the girls (Daria Shezaf), and the dependence of another (Neta Bar-Rafael), sweep her into a triangle of power that gets out of control.

== Cast ==
Character	Actor
Alice	Ilanit Ben-Yaakov
Neta	Daria Shezaf
Vered	Neta Bar-Rafael
Yoel	Amos Shuv
Yigal	Haim Zanati
Eli	Itai Naveh

== Reception ==
Avner Shavit, in his review, wrote that considering that it is her debut feature, Goldberg presented the story "cleanly and precisely", and found her direction of the talented cast effective. He thought, however, that the script lacked some indefinable quality that would make this "beautiful and powerful drama" more memorable. Oron Shamir found it the most "thought provoking film" of the Jerusalem Film Festival, and commended Goldberg's treatment in her first feature of themes she dealt with in her earlier work - namely power dynamics and love between women.

Nirit Enderman called it a powerful film, much needed in a cinematic landscape sorely lacking in women and described it as "a film that does not spare its viewers. It confronts them with the harsh emotions of a protagonist who is in constant depression and disappoints herself and those around her. She is a mother who cannot give her young son the love he so longs for. She is a wife who cannot provide her partner with the attention he expects, and who cannot give her patients the emotional support they need." Her review, which includes an interview with Goldberg, asks why the work is so "heavy", to which Goldberg replies that Alice represents many women who, despite moments of grace, carry heavy burdens placed on them by society, in this case - a woman who never should have had children, but did so under pressure.

== Awards ==
Year	Award	Category	Nominee(s)	Result	Notes
2012	Jerusalem Film Festival	Best Israeli Feature - Honorable Mention	Dana Goldberg	Won	
2012	Jerusalem Film Festival	Best Actress	Ilanit Ben-Yaakov	Won	
2012	Jerusalem Film Festival	Gottlieb Award - Best Screenplay	Dana Goldberg	Won	
2012	Jerusalem Film Festival	Haggiag Award - Best Feature	Dana Goldberg	Nominated	
