= Yael Eisenberg =

Israeli musician, singer, actress, and poet

Yael Eisenberg יעל איזנברג
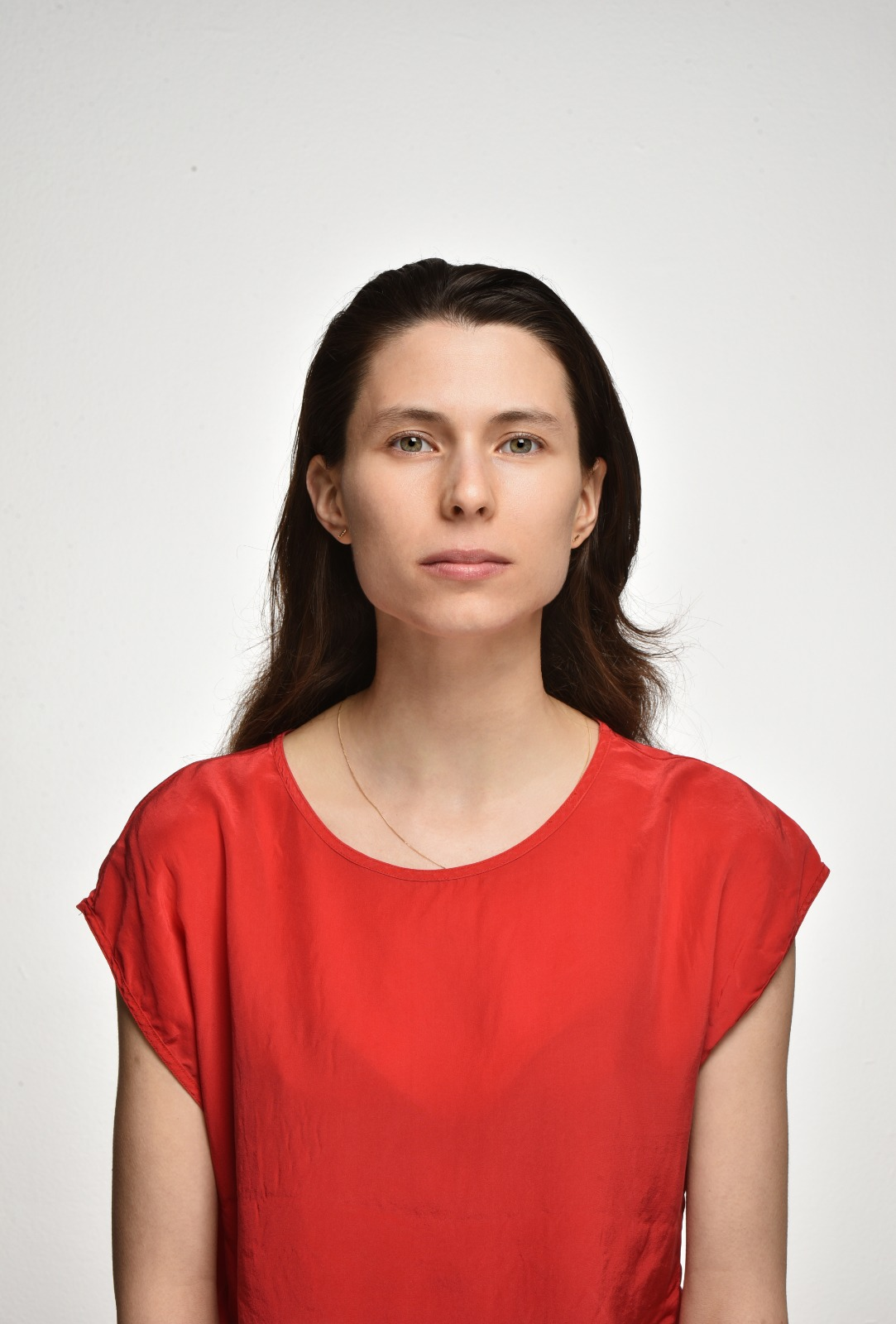
- Yael Eisenberg, 2021

Background information
- Born: 8 April 1991 (age 35); Tel Aviv, Israel
- Genre: Contemporary
- Instrument: Guitar
- Years active: 2002-present

Yael Eisenberg (Hebrew: יעל איזנברג; born: 8 April 1991) is an Israeli singer-songwriter, actress and poet.

== Biography ==
Eisenberg was born and raised in Tel Aviv. She majored in theatre at Alon high-school in Ramat HaSharon and graduated in 2009. While in the IDF, Eisenberg served as an infantry instructor. Eisenberg is lesbian.

=== Acting career ===
At age 11, Eisenberg made her television debut on the Israeli Children's channel playing the lead role of Anat in a teen series entitled "Ba'it Meshutaf" (Shared Home). That same year, Eisenberg took part in a short film produced for the channel entitled "Tiul Shnati" (Class Trip) alongside Tal Mosseri.

In 2005, she played the role of Zohar in the series "The System" which was directed by Zion Rubin.

In 2009, she played Hagit in the third season of the daily drama "Ha'Alufa" (The Champion) on Israeli cable channel HOT3 alongside Yehuda Levi, Alon Abutbul and Hila Alpert. That same year, she played Tami in a film entitled "Od Ani Holech" (As I am walking) directed by Yaky Yosha.

In 2010, Eisenberg was cast for the lead role in a film directed by Ruthy Pri-Bar entitled "Si'hot Achronot" (Last Calls).

In 2014, Eisenberg played the lead role of Anna in a film directed by Veronica Nicole Teitelbaum and participated in another short film of hers entitled "Vidui" (Confession) which won the Best Film Award at the Southern Film Festival.

In 2016, Eisenberg participated in the film "Foxtrot" directed by Shmulik Maoz.

In 2019, Eisenberg participated in an indie project entitled "Be'Hezkatam" (In Their Care) by Keren Bergman and Jonathan Ophrat.

=== Musical career ===
Yael Eisenberg started playing classical guitar and writing songs at age 15.

In 2012 she began performing her original material at clubs such as the "Ozen Bar", "Levontin 7" and "Cafe Bialik" in Tel Aviv.

In 2014, she performed the song "Everything Reminds Me of Her" in a tribute album for Elliot Smith entitled "See You In Heaven".

In 2015, she harmonized the song of poet and author Yotam Reuveni entitled "Ehad HaYeladim" (One of the Children) and recorded it for the tribute project "Hashaa Hachi Yafa" (The Most Beautiful Hour) artistically directed by David Pearl. That same year she recorded background sounds in the song "Mashu Ra" (Something Bad) in Hila Ruach's album "Rofa BaMaarav" (Medicine Woman in the West).

In 2016, Eisenberg recorded a song in Icelandic in a tribute album for the Icelandic band "Sigur Ros", recorded a duet with the band "Benjamin's Brother" produced by Uri Vinokor, and was selected to put on a performance at the Piano Festival at the Tel Aviv Museum of Art. That same year she went on an extended performance tour in Italy as an accompanying musician for the artist Numka.

In 2017, Eisenberg released her debut album "Ani Yodaat Shemedubar BaSof" (I Know It's the End) which consisted of 12 songs which she wrote and harmonized under the musical production of Jonathan Levinthal. Songs from the album ("Kol Achat" (Any One), "Shem Layeled" (Name for the Child), "Kav Hakeev" (Line of Pain)) were regularly played on radio stations such as Kan 88, Galgalatz and Radio HaKatze. That same year, Eisenberg was invited to play an original song, "Kol Haolam" (The Entire World), for a live stream for the YouTube channel, "BalconyTV".

In the winter of 2017, Eisenberg was invited to open for musician Amir Lev nationwide.

In 2018, Eisenberg appeared in Time Out magazine's list of "Best and Interesting Musicians Today". That same year she played the lead in the Rock Opera "Ruby Ga Ba'olam" (Ruby Touch The World) written by Alon Eder and his spouse Shani Gabai, accompanied by the Revolution Orchestra at the Tel Aviv Arts Center. Eisenberg performed at the Indie Negev Festival at Mitzpe Gvulot and recorded a cover version to the song "Algea" for the bonus album of "Shney Levavot" (Two Hearts) of Musician Einav Jackson Cohen.

In 2019, Eisenberg was invited to write a song for the "Outline Sketch and Words" festival in Jerusalem.

In 2020, Eisenberg began recording a new album in Hebrew produced by Omri Amado (Jane Bordeaux, Oren Brazilai, Daniel Rubin).

On March 8, 2021, the songs "Bachurot Yafot" (Pretty Girls) and "Bimkom Michatav" (Instead of a Letter) written by Mayan Even were released as a double single. Eisenberg harmonized and produced the songs in cooperation with the musician Numka.

The first single "Kol Haolam" (The Whole World) from her new album "Kol Haleilot Hapchu LeYamim" (All the Nights Turned into Days) is expected to come out in Summer of 2021. with the album expected to be released in winter of 2021. The song is accompanied by a video clip which was directed by actor and producer Vitali Freidland, and with Misha Kaminsky who rendered the cinematography. The clip also includes actress Milly Eshet. The clip was awarded a grant by the Pais Council for Culture and Art.

== Works ==
=== Poetry ===
Eisenberg is a graduate of the poetry course of the Helicon school for writing which was established by the poets Amir Or and Irit Sela.

In 2019, Eisenberg debut book entitled "Sichot Im HaYalda" (Talks With the Girl) was published in a poetry series entitled "Textura" (Texture) by Pardes Publishing and edited by the poet Alon Bar. The book received high praise by critics and poems from it were published in Haaretz and Yediot Achronot. Eisenberg was invited to read her poems at the "Yearot Menashe" festival and the "Meshubeshet" festival at the "Ashan Hazman" club in Beer Sheva. She was also a guest on the radio show "MaSheKaruch" on the Kan Culture station. Additional poems of hers are published in magazines and online media such as "Ho!", "Paper 77", "Meshubeshet", "Atar" and "Meshiv HaRuach".

In 2021, Eisenberg was invited to participate in the project "Yotzot Mehashura" (Out of Line - Poetesses and Artists Light Up the Street) initiated by Makom Leshira (A Place for Poetry) publishing house, with her poem "Nasati LaCafe" (I Drove for Coffee). Before its publication, the book received support by the Rabinovich Foundation and the Jewish National Fund. After its publication, the book was awarded the Culture Ministry prize for debut books.

Currently, Eisenberg is working on a second poetry book which is to be edited by the poetess Anat Zacharia.

== Films ==
In 2025, she acted in Houses, an Israel, Germany co-production drama film as Sasha. The film was selected in Forum at 75th Berlin International Film Festival, where it will have first screening in February 2025.
