= The Slave (Singer novel) =

1962 novel by Isaac Bashevis Singer

- First English edition
- Author: Isaac Bashevis Singer
- Original title: Der Knecht
- Language: Yiddish
- Publisher: Farrar Straus Giroux
- Publication date: 1962
- Publication place: United States
- Pages: 311

The Slave (Yiddish: דער קנעכט, romanized: Der Knecht) is a 1962 novel by Isaac Bashevis Singer, originally written in Yiddish. It tells the story of Jacob, a scholar sold into slavery in the aftermath of the Khmelnytsky massacres, who falls in love with a gentile woman. Through the eyes of Jacob, the book recounts the history of Jewish settlement in Poland at the end of the 17th century. While most of the book's protagonists are Jews, the book is also a criticism of Orthodox Jewish society. The English version was translated by the author and Cecil Hemley.

== Plot summary ==
Jacob, the hero of the book, is a resident of Josefov, a Jewish town in Poland. After the Khmelnytsky massacres, in which his wife and three children were murdered by Cossacks, Jacob is sold as a slave to gentile peasants in the southern Polish mountains. During his years of slavery, he strives to maintain his Judaism by observing as many Jewish rituals as possible and by maintaining high ethical standards for himself.

While in captivity, Jacob falls in love with his master's daughter, Wanda. While Jewish law and custom forbids Jews from even touching a woman a man is not married to and also forbids Jews from cohabiting with gentiles, Jacob's love for Wanda is too powerful to overcome and they have sex. Later, Jews from Josefov come to ransom him by paying off Wanda's father and he returns to Josefov. While in Josefov, Jacob dreams of Wanda. In his dream, Wanda is pregnant and asks Jacob why he abandoned her and left the child in her womb to be raised by gentiles. Jacob decides to return to the gentile village, take Wanda as his wife, and help her convert to Judaism. Jacob and Wanda reach another town, Pilitz, where Jacob begins to make his living as a teacher. In Pilitz, Wanda becomes known as 'Sarah' and Jacob instructs her to be pretend that she is deaf and mute so as not to reveal her gentile origins. Sarah thirsts for knowledge about Judaism and at night, Jacob teaches her Jewish beliefs and practices. She suffers in silence as the women of the town gossip about her right in front of her, as they believe she is deaf and cannot hear them. Her secret is finally discovered when she screams loudly at the women gossiping around her during the birth of her and Jacob's son. Frustrated at the predictions of her death openly discussed around her, Sarah has enough, demanding to be able to die in peace and pointing out the hypocrisy the townsfolk. Sarah dies after the difficult birth, and is given a "donkey's burial" outside of the Jewish cemetery. Jacob is taken away by two dragoons to be executed for converting a Christian to Judaism, but he escapes.

Jacob names his baby son Benjamin (he likens himself to the biblical Jacob whose wife, Rachel, died giving birth to biblical Benjamin); he travels to the Land of Israel with the infant, and Benjamin grows up to become a lecturer in a yeshiva in Jerusalem.

20 years later, Jacob returns to Pilitz and discovers that the town had grown and that, with it, the cemetery had grown so much that the place where Sarah was buried is now within the bounds of the cemetery. The place where Sarah was buried is not prominently marked and is unknown to the Jews of Pilitz. Jacob is old and weak and dies during his visit to Pilitz. By coincidence (or perhaps, by way of a miracle), as a grave is being dug for him, the bones of Sarah are found. The townspeople decide to bury them together, side by side with a commemorative headstone.

== Stage version ==
The book was adapted by Yevgeny Arye and Yelena Laskina of into a play by Gesher Theater. Michael Jeffrey Shapiro, composer, has written a two-act opera based on the novel.

== Themes ==
The book was published in 1962, a time in Jewish history in which the magnitude of the Holocaust was beginning to surface. The book's setting during the aftermath of the Khmelnytsky massacres could be seen as a historical parallel to what many American Jews were thinking and feeling during the early 1960s.

The book contains criticism of the hypocrisy inherent in a narrow-minded interpretation of Judaism. The Jews of Pilitz in The Slave make a point of keeping commandments between man and God, but many treat Sarah and Jacob in ways that does not square well with Jewish ideals. The character of Gershon is especially cruel and often gets his way simply by bullying others, yet he keeps a strictly kosher home.

Also prominent in the story is the theme of vegetarianism. Singer himself was a passionate vegetarian and Jacob's attitude towards animals during his captivity and his explanation at the end of the novel of his vegetarian philosophy could be seen as Singer writing autobiographically.

== Critical reception ==
Writing in The New York Times, Orville Prescott called the novel a "Jewish Pilgrim's Progress", in which the hero keeps his faith despite all setbacks. Prescott appreciated the pacy, eventful plot but criticised the way the characters were portrayed as symbols rather than human beings.

Rafael Broch notes how the purity of the rural scene and of the hero's faith contrast with the vulgarity of the 'lewd peasants and prejudiced landowners'. Broch calls this a Romeo and Juliet tale in 'circumstances even less permissive'.

For Ted Hughes the book is 'burningly radiant, intensely beautiful'.

In a 1971 interview, Bob Dylan said of The Slave: “It must have stayed in my head for months afterward.”
