= Houses (film) =

2025 Israel-Germany drama film

- Promotional poster
- Hebrew: בתים
- Literally: Batim
- Directed by: Veronica Nicole Tetelbaum
- Produced by: Elad Gavish; Adi Navon; Anatol Schuster; Veronica Nicole Tetelbaum
- Starring: Yael Eisenberg; Tali Sharon; Evgenia Dodina
- Cinematography: Yaniv Linton
- Edited by: Avishai Sivan
- Music by: Rike Huy
- Production companies: Zwillingfilm; Marker Films; Nova Production
- Release date: 16 February 2025 (Berlinale)
- Running time: 98 minutes
- Countries: Israel; Germany
- Languages: Hebrew; Russian

Houses (Hebrew: בתים (Batim)) is a 2025 drama film written and directed by Veronica Nicole Tetelbaum in her debut feature. Starring Yael Eisenberg as Sasha, a non-binary person who emigrated to Israel from the Soviet Union as a child in the 1990s.

An Israeli-German co-production, shot in black and white, the film had its world premiere at the Forum section of the 75th Berlin International Film Festival, where it had first screening on 16 February 2025. It is also selected for 39th Teddy Award, and will compete for Best Feature Film.

== Synopsis ==
Sasha, a non-binary individual who immigrated to Israel from the Soviet Union in the 1990s, finds themselves revisiting their former homes, haunted by memories. This contemplative black-and-white piece explores the essence of feeling at home, not only within a house but also within one's body and across the passage of time.

== Cast ==
- Yael Eisenberg as Sasha
- Tali Sharon as Anna
- Evgenia Dodina as The mother
- Philipp Mogilnitskiy as The father

== Release ==
Houses had its world premiere in the Forum section of the 75th Berlin International Film Festival 16 February 2025.

== Accolades ==
Award	Date	Category	Recipient	Result	Ref.
Berlin International Film Festival	23 February 2025	Teddy Award for Best Feature Films	Veronica Nicole Tetelbaum	Nominated	
