= Uri Rosenwaks =

Israeli director and producer (born 1965)

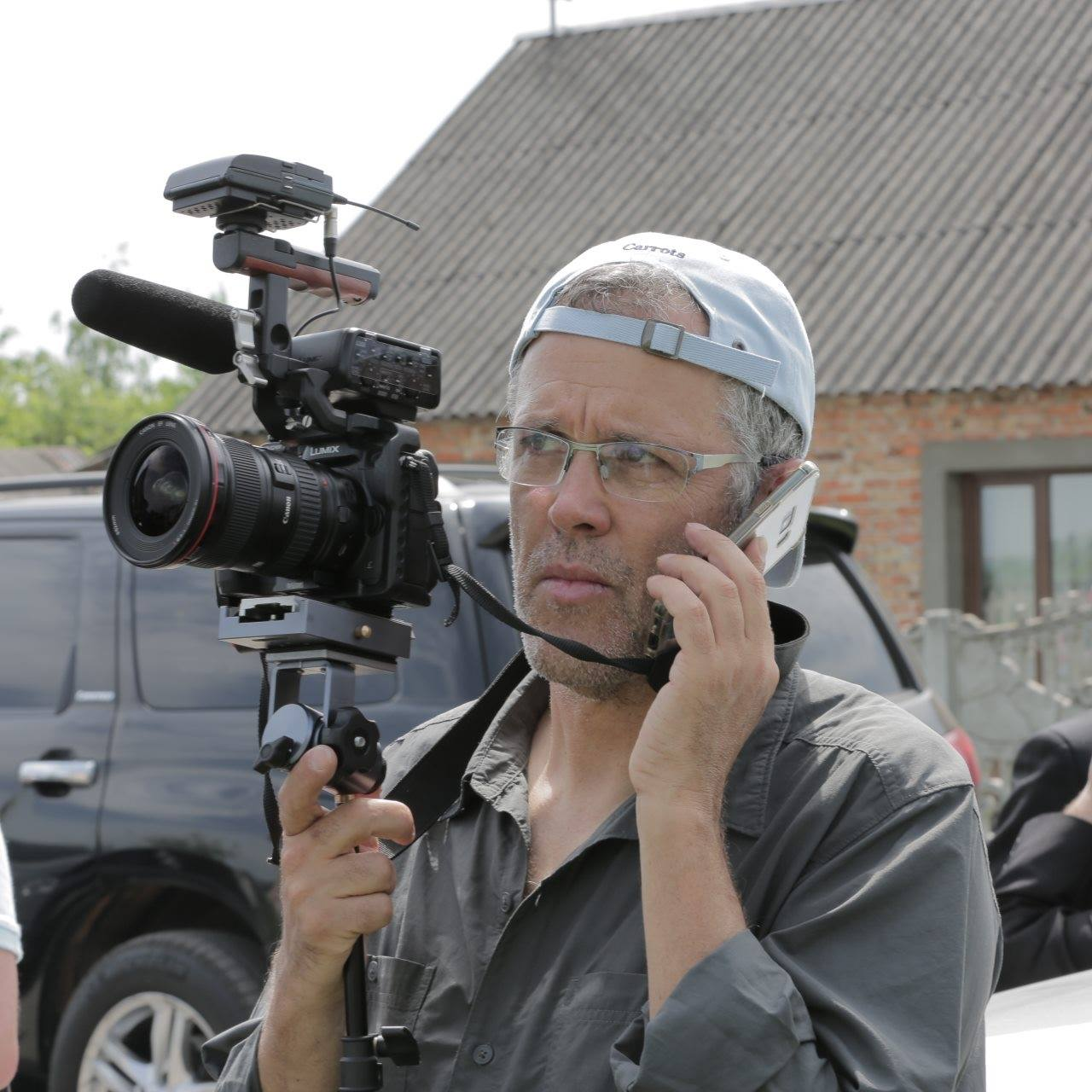
Uri Rosenwaks

Uri Rosenwaks (Hebrew: אורי רוזנווקס; Born 1965) is an Israeli director and producer.

== Biography ==
Uri Rosenwaks was born in Jerusalem, grew up in Beersheba, and currently resides in Ramat Gan. He is married to Tami, and the couple has 3 children. He is a graduate of the School of Film and Television and has a Master's degree in Near Eastern Studies, both from Tel Aviv University. Rosenwaks embarked on his creative career in 1991 and has since directed, written, and produced a large number of projects for cinema and television, including documentaries, fictional films, and current affairs programs. He served as the chairperson of The Israeli Documentary Filmmakers Forum between 2010 and 2013.

== Documentary ==
Rosenwaks is Director and Producer of a variety of documentary films and Series. His recent works include; "The Nobelists" 2015, "Leibowitz: Faith, Country and Man" (in collaboration with Rinat Klein) Honorable Mention at the Jerusalem Film Festival 2012, and the award-winning series "Lod Between Hope and Despair" (in collaboration with Eyal Blachson), winner of Best Series, The Israeli Documentary Awards 2013 and the 2013 Awards of the Israeli Television Academy.

Rosenwaks was involved in a cinematic project in the Bedouin city of Rahat located in the Negev Desert in the southern part of Israel. Rosenwaks founded a film class for Bedouin women in Rahat. What began as an afternoon course for teaching the use of a video–camera evolved into a full-scale documentary workshop that has already produced two films: "The Film-Class," which premiered in the Jerusalem Film Festival in 2006 and won the Israeli Documentary TV Film of the Year Award for 2007 was the first project, followed by "Back and Forth" which Rosenwaks produced and is made up of four short stories, all directed by Bedouin directors on their professional debut. He directed the film "Town on a Wire" (2015) with Eyal Blachson. The film's debut took place at the Copenhagen International Documentary Festival in November 2015, and competed at Docaviv Film Festival 2016. In 2017 he created “The Great Eagle” a documentary series on the life and thought of Maimonides, it premiered at the 2017 Jerusalem Film Festival.

In 2018, he directed and produced "The Right to Riot", a three-part series about protests in Israel. "The Right to Riot" supported by Channel 8 and the Rabinowitz foundation, won the Best series, The Israeli Documentary Awards 2018. In 2019, his series ‘Kingdoms’ was aired on Israeli Public Broadcasting Corporation and supported by the Gesher & Maimonides fund, premiered in the Jewish film festival in Jerusalem.

== Fiction ==
His graduation film "Saturday of the Groom" (fictional 1991) won the Israeli Film Institute Award for film of the year 1992 and the Israeli Directors Guild Award for Best Director. He directed "Angel Eyes" (1996), a Television drama, part of the series "Short Stories about Love" produced by Hagai Levi (In Treatment); and "Detective in Jerusalem", a TV mini-series produced by Assaf Amir (Broken Wings).

== Television ==
Rosenwaks was a director and staff member of Uvda ("Fact"), Israel’s investigative and current affairs television news program for 14 years (1993-2007). He wrote and directed over 60 documentary reports. He directed and co-developed "The Food Trail", a series about food, families, and culture in Israel and around the world (produced by Assaf Amir) and nominated for the Israeli Ophir Awards.
