= Your Honor (Indian TV series) =

Indian web series

- Genre: Crime triller
- Based on: Kvodo by Shlomo Mashiach and Ron Ninio
- Directed by: Eshwar Niwas
- Starring: Jimmy Shergill; Pulkit Makol; Mita Vashisht; Yashpal Sharma; Parul Gulati
- Country of origin: India
- Original languages: Hindi; Punjabi
- No. of seasons: 2
- No. of episodes: 22

Production
- Production location: India
- Running time: 30–40 minutes
- Production company: Applause Entertainment Sphereorigins

Original release
- Network: SonyLIV
- Release: 18 June 2020 – 19 November 2021

Related
- Kvodo (2017–2019); Your Honor (2020–2023); Your Honor (2024)

Your Honor is an Indian thriller drama streaming television series, directed by Eeshwar Nivas, under the production house Applause Entertainment. The series stars Jimmy Shergill, Pulkit Makol, Mita Vashisht, Yashpal Sharma and Parul Gulati in the main roles. Despite its name being similar to the American adaptation, the series is adaptated from Israeli TV series Kvodo (Hebrew: כבודו). The story follows a judge who lets go of his moralities, relationships and goes on to undermine ethics in order to save his son. The series was released on June 18, 2020, on the Indian OTT platform of SonyLIV.

The second season of Your Honor was released on November 19, 2021. Gulshan Grover and Mahie Gill were the new major additions to the show.

== Premise ==
Season 1

The story of the series revolves around Bishan Khosla and his son. Bishan's son Abeer gets caught in a hit and run case. The boy who is hit in this case by Abeer is the son of the city gangster. Bishan Khosla sacrifices relationships and subverts the law to save his son from a vengeful gangster. The series portrays how even the pinnacle of law breaks in order to save their family.

Season 2

After Judge Bishan Khosla shot Satnam Mudki, he finds himself in serious trouble, not only with the Mudki family but also the Tarn Taran mafia and Pandit gang that understands the importance of having a High Court Judge in its pocket.

== Cast ==
=== Main cast ===
- Jimmy Shergill as Bishan Khosla
- Pulkit Makol as Abeer Khosla
- Richa Pallod as Indu Samthar
- Mita Vashisht as Kiran Sekhon
- Varun Badola as Kaashi Samthar
- Kunj Anand as Harman Mudki

Recurring (Season 1)

- Parul Gulati as Ruma Pathak
- Suhasini Mulay as Sheel Tandon, Khosla's Mother-in-law
- Yashpal Sharma as Pandit
- Parag Gupta as Guddan alias Shashi Tiwari
- Mahabir Bhullar as Satbir Singh Mudki
- Bikramjeet Kanwarpal as Judge Punchhi
- Taniya Kalra as Amrita Singh, Sports teacher of Abeer's college

Recurring (Season 2)

- Mahie Gill as Yashpreet
- Gulshan Grover as Gurjot
- Zeishan Quadri as Jagda
- Bhumika Dube as Latika, Pandit's widow
- Gagan Deep Singh as Sub Inspector Mandeep, Sekhon's subordinate
- Akriti Singh as Mahi, Abeer's love interest
- Nazim Khan as Jailor Dalal
- Abhishek Bajaj as Aman

== Production ==
In April 2021, Thirty six crew members, including Jimmy Sheirgill, were booked by the Punjab Police for violating COVID-19 guidelines. Reportedly, the team was shooting at a school in Ludhiana during curfew hours.

== Release ==
First season of the series premiered on 18 June 2020.

== Episodes ==
=== Season 1 ===
Series	Episodes	Originally released
1	12	18 June 2018

No. overall	No. in season	Title	Directed by	Original release date
1	1	"The Fall Guy"	Eeshwar Nivas	18 June 2018
2	2	"Protégé"	Eeshwar Nivas	18 June 2018
3	3	"Few Loose Ends"	Eeshwar Nivas	18 June 2018
4	4	"Alibi"	Eeshwar Nivas	18 June 2018
5	5	"Any eye for an eye"	Eeshwar Nivas	18 June 2018
6	6	"Sacrificial Lamb"	Eeshwar Nivas	18 June 2018
7	7	"Cause and Effect"	Eeshwar Nivas	18 June 2018
8	8	"Deeper Waters"	Eeshwar Nivas	18 June 2018
9	9	"The Downward Spiral"	Eeshwar Nivas	18 June 2018
10	10	"All Out in The Open"	Eeshwar Nivas	18 June 2018
11	11	"The Noose Tightens"	Eeshwar Nivas	18 June 2018
12	12	"The Last Straw"	Eeshwar Nivas	18 June 2018

== Reception ==
Saibal Chatterjee from NDTV praised the performances of the cast stating "Mita Vashisht is brilliant. Varun Badola stands tall in the guise of a family man forced by circumstances to stoop low". Jyoti Kanyal from India Today expressed in her review on the series as a gripping tale of lies and manipulations. Arushi Jain from The Indian Express shared her first impressions on the series stating "The climax of every episode leaves you at the edge-of-your-seat, and the thrills keep coming as the episodes pass". Nandini Ramnath from Scroll.in explained and stated how the series depicts that the family comes before law.

Archika Khurana of The Times of India rated season 2 3.5/5 and stated "Your Honor will leave you at the point where you would want to know what will happen next. Most importantly, if you like the first season, this one is a perfect follow-up with some riveting performances."

Saibal Chatterjee from NDTV gave the second season, 3 stars out of 5 and stated "Your Honor Season 2 is the sort of web series that is easy to recommend - it is riveting all way."
