= Dana Goldberg (director) =

Israeli film director, poet, playwright (born 1979)

- דנה גולדברג
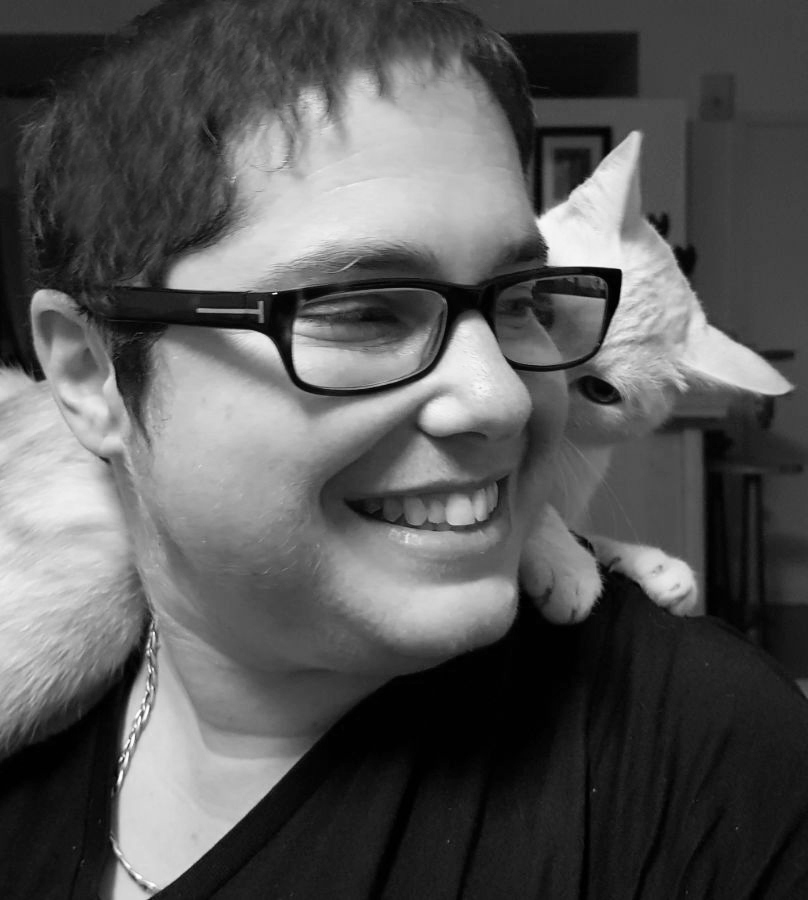
- Born: March 1, 1979 (age 47); Herzliya, Israel
- Occupations: Film director; poet; playwright
- Years active: 2003–present
- Website: goldbergdana.com

Dana Goldberg (Hebrew: דנה גולדברג; born March 1, 1979) is an Israeli poet, filmmaker and playwright.

== Biography ==
Goldberg was born in Herzliya. Her father was a pilot and her mother worked at a bank. As a child, she studied many different creative fields: photography, music, plastic art, and writing. After high school, she studied at HaMidrasha – Faculty of the Arts and at Beit Berl College, while also beginning her path as a poet. Her work was published in literary journals, first in HaMe'orer and then others, including Iton 77, Helicon, and Shebo, and she was on the editorial board of the online poetry journal Anonymous Fish?. Her first collection, Orange Coral, was published in 2011.

Beginning in 2003, Goldberg created a series of short films, including Alligator (2009), for which she won the Emerging Director award at the International Women's Film Festival In Rehovot. In 2005, she was invited to take part in the Young Talent Campus of the Berlin Film Festival. In 2012, her first full-length feature film came out, Alice, about a woman who works the night shift in a residential rehabilitation school, and spends her days sleeping. The film won three awards at the Jerusalem Film Festival, a special mention at the Rehovot International Women's Film Festival, and was selected to open the Berlin Israel Film Festival in 2014. In 2018, the film Death of a Poetess came out, which she directed and wrote together with Efrat Mishori.

While much of Goldberg's work includes romantic and sexual relationships between women, she says, "My work isn't lesbian, it is feminist and critical of the society I live in, and the community I live in...There are many other important aspects of my life as an artist and also as a lesbian."

In 2016, Goldberg and Mishori founded Kinoclan, a non-profit organization that works to promote the creation and distribution of literary and film works that give voice to women's worlds, told from women's perspectives.

In theater, Goldberg wrote the play Father, Mother, Whore, which was published in the literary journal Masmerim, and was staged in the format of "directed reading" at the Tsav Kria festival (2010). She also wrote Esti of the Pines, which was staged at the Theatronetto festival in 2014.

In 2023, her film Debbie Was Here won the Artistic Achievement in a Feature Film award at the Haifa International Film Festival. In October 2024, she won the Haifa Culture Fund Opus grant in the Haifa International Film Festival pitch competition for her film in development, The Left Heart.

== Awards ==
Year	Nominated work	Category	Result	Notes
2018	Death of a Poetess	Best Debut Film, Göteborg Film Festival	Nominated	Shared with Efrat Mishori
2017	Death of a Poetess	Best Israeli Feature, Jerusalem Film Festival	Nominated	Shared with Efrat Mishori
2012	Alice	Best Israeli Feature – Honorable Mention, Jerusalem Film Festival	Won	Haggiag award
2012	Alice	Best Screenplay, Jerusalem Film Festival	Won	Gottlieb award
2012	Alice	Best Israeli Feature, Jerusalem Film Festival	Nominated	Haggiag award

== Filmography ==
Year	Title	Role	Notes
2003	Nomi Teller	Director, screenwriter	Short film
2004	Cell	Director, screenwriter	Short film
2004	Untitled	Director, screenwriter	Short film
2005	Masha	Director, screenwriter	Short film
2007	Alpha	Director, screenwriter	Short film
2009	Alligator	Director, screenwriter	Short film
2012	Alice	Director, screenwriter	Feature film
2014	The Last Word	Director, screenwriter	Short film, part of Love Letter to Cinema project
2014	V	Director, screenwriter	Short film, with Efrat Mishori
2015	No Shadow	Director, screenwriter	Short film, with Efrat Mishori
2016	Four Mothers	Director, screenwriter	Short film
2017	Death of a Poetess	Director, screenwriter	Feature film, with Efrat Mishori
2018	Gabriel	Script editor	Short film
2023	Debbie Was Here	Director, screenwriter	Feature film
	The Left Heart (in development)	Director, screenwriter	Feature film

== Poetry ==
- אלמוגים כתומים (Orange Corals), Keshev LeShira, 2011
- שמש ישירה (Direct Sun), Locus, 2020

== Plays ==
- 2010: אב, אם, זונה (Father, Mother, Whore)
- 2014: אסתי של האורנים (Esti of the Pine Trees)

== See also ==
- List of female film and television directors
- List of lesbian filmmakers
- List of LGBT-related films directed by women
