= Bruno Lukk =

Estonian pianist and pedagogue

Bruno Lukk (30 June 1909 Chusovoy, Perm Governorate – 31 May 1991 Tallinn) was an Estonian pianist and pedagogue. He was one of the most notable piano pedagogues in Estonia.

In 1913, his family moved to Estonia. In 1928 he graduated from Riga Conservatory.

From 1940 to 1991, he taught at Tallinn Conservatory. From 1948 to 1951, he was the director of the conservatory.

Besides teaching, he also gave solo and duo concerts. For over 40 years, he collaborated (as a piano duo) with pianist Anna Klas.
