= Your Honor (American TV series) =

American legal drama TV series

- Genre: Crime drama; Legal drama
- Based on: Kvodo by Shlomo Mashiach and Ron Ninio
- Developed by: Peter Moffat
- Starring: Bryan Cranston; Hunter Doohan; Hope Davis; Sofia Black-D'Elia; Isiah Whitlock Jr.; Michael Stuhlbarg; Carmen Ejogo; Andrene Ward-Hammond; Keith Machekanyanga; Benjamin Flores Jr.; Lilli Kay; Jimi Stanton
- Music by: Volker Bertelmann; David Buckley
- Country of origin: United States
- Original language: English
- No. of seasons: 2
- No. of episodes: 20

Production
- Executive producers: Peter Moffat; Robert King; Michelle King; Liz Glotzer; Bryan Cranston; James Degus; Alon Aranya; Rob Golenberg; Ron Ninio; Shlomo Mashiach; Ram Landes; Ron Eilon; Danna Stern; Edward Berger; Joey Hartstone (season 2)
- Producers: Debra Lovatelli; Todd Lewis; Dewayne Darian Jones; Joey Hartstone (season 1); Aalia Brown; Devin Rich
- Cinematography: James Friend; John Lindley; Richard Rutkowski; Michael Grady; Crescenzo Notarile; Anette Haellmigk
- Editors: Tim Murrell; Michael Ruscio; Lynne Willingham; Jennifer Barbot; Diva Magpayo; Skip Macdonald; Matt Kregor; Hugo Diaz; Scott Turner; Joey Reinisch
- Running time: 46–60 minutes
- Production companies: King Size Productions; Moonshot Entertainment; CBS Studios

Original release
- Network: Showtime
- Release: December 6, 2020 – March 19, 2023

Related
- Kvodo (2017–2019); Your Honor (2020–2021); Your Honor (2024)

Your Honor is an American drama television series starring Bryan Cranston, adapted from the Israeli TV series Kvodo. It premiered on Showtime on December 6, 2020. While ordered as a miniseries, in August 2021, the series was renewed for a second season that premiered on January 15, 2023, and ended on March 19, 2023.

== Premise ==
Season 1: Michael Desiato is a prominent and respected New Orleans judge. When his teenage son Adam kills another teenager in an accidental hit-and-run collision, Michael encourages his son to turn himself in, but quickly changes his mind when he discovers the boy his son killed was the son of a mob kingpin. Michael decides to protect his son, igniting a dangerous game of lies, secrets, and difficult choices with tragic and fatal consequences.

Season 2: After the events of Season 1, Michael moves on to try to finally put an end to the mob that has ruined the lives of so many. Meanwhile, an enemy of the mob, a drug cartel known as the Desire Gang, makes its move, which risks causing past truths to come to light. Michael is forced to make difficult decisions as he becomes an undercover agent spying on the mob while seeking the culprit(s) behind the death of his wife. Past consequences intrude, leading Michael down a dangerous path.

== Cast and characters ==
=== Main ===
- Bryan Cranston as Michael Desiato, a New Orleans judge, willing to do anything to protect his son.
- Hunter Doohan as Adam Desiato (season 1), Michael's son who is involved in a hit and run that resulted in the death of the son of the head of an organized crime family in New Orleans.
- Hope Davis as Gina Baxter, the ruthless wife of a New Orleans mob boss and the mother of the boy whom Adam killed
- Sofia Black-D'Elia as Frannie Latimer (season 1), Adam's love interest and teacher who knows his secret
- Isiah Whitlock Jr. as Charlie Figaro, a politician with connections to organized crime and Michael's best friend
- Michael Stuhlbarg as Jimmy Baxter, the boss of an organized crime family, Gina's husband and the father of the boy whom Adam killed
- Carmen Ejogo as Lee Delamere (season 1; recurring season 2), Michael's former protégé and a lawyer whom he convinces to take Kofi's case (Note: Ejogo is not credited and does not appear until the second episode.)
- Andrene Ward-Hammond as "Big Mo" (season 2; recurring season 1), the leader of Desire, a criminal gang in the Lower Ninth Ward
- Keith Machekanyanga as Trey "Little Mo" Monroe (season 2; recurring season 1), Big Mo's nephew and right-hand man
- Benjamin Flores Jr. as Eugene "Little Man" Jones (season 2; recurring season 1), the younger brother of Kofi Jones and a member of Desire
- Lilli Kay as Sofia "Fia" Baxter (season 2; recurring season 1), Gina and Jimmy's daughter who becomes Adam's girlfriend unaware that Adam killed her brother Rocco
- Jimi Stanton as Carlo Baxter (season 2; recurring season 1), Gina and Jimmy's eldest son, who was released from Angola Prison after Adam killed his brother Rocco

=== Special guest stars ===
- Margo Martindale as Elizabeth Guthrie, a state senator, Michael's mother-in-law and Adam's maternal grandmother
- Maura Tierney as Fiona McKee (season 1), a prosecutor at the same courthouse where Michael works

=== Recurring ===
- Amy Landecker as Nancy Costello, a detective Michael turns to for help
- Tony Curran as Frankie, an associate of Jimmy's criminal organization
- Lamar Johnson as Kofi Jones (season 1), a young man who was forced by Little Mo to take the fall for Adam's hit and run
- Chet Hanks as Joey Maldini, Carlo's best friend who also works for Jimmy
- David Maldonado as Lieutenant Brendan Cusack, a corrupt NOPD officer with ties to Jimmy, the Desire gang and Charlie
- Cullen Moss as Detective Rudy Cunningham, a corrupt officer who is connected to various crimes committed throughout New Orleans
- Melanie Nicholls-King as "Female" Jones (season 1), Kofi and Eugene's mother
- Sampley Barinaga as Wesley (season 1), Adam's best friend
- Lorraine Toussaint as Judge Sara LeBlanc (season 1), the chief justice at the same courthouse where Michael works
- Benjamin Wadsworth as Rocco Baxter (season 1), Gina and Jimmy's youngest son who was accidentally killed by Adam.
- Rosie Perez as Olivia Delmont (season 2), an assistant U.S Attorney for the Eastern District of Louisiana
- Mark Margolis as Carmine Conti (season 2), Gina's father
- Mark O'Brien as Father Jay (season 2), the Roman Catholic priest of the Baxter family
- Ciara Renée as Janelle (season 2), Big Mo's love interest who is a singer
- Gavin 'Chief' Meredith as Chris (season 2), a former Desire member who becomes disgruntled with the way Big Mo does business

== Episodes ==
=== Series overview ===
Season	Episodes	Originally released	
Season	Episodes	First released	Last released
1	10	December 6, 2020	February 14, 2021
2	10	January 15, 2023	March 19, 2023

=== Season 1 (2020–21) ===
No. overall	No. in season	Title	Directed by	Written by	Original release date	U.S. viewers (millions)
1	1	"Part One"	Edward Berger	Teleplay by : Peter Moffat	December 6, 2020	0.449
Adam Desiato, the 17 year-old son of New Orleans judge Michael Desiato, goes to visit the site of his deceased mother's murder on the one year anniversary of her death. While driving, he accidentally strikes another teenager, Rocco Baxter, on a motorcycle. Adam, panic-stricken, watches as the young man dies, and then flees the scene after suffering an asthma attack. Adam begins trying to cover up any evidence. When Michael returns home, Adam confides to his father about the accident. Michael convinces his son to turn himself in. However, when he realizes that the victim is the son of Jimmy Baxter, a notorious organized crime figure, Michael fears for Adam and decides to hide his son's involvement.
2	2	"Part Two"	Edward Berger	Peter Moffat	December 13, 2020	0.658
Michael asks his long time friend and New Orleans mayoral candidate, Charlie Figaro, to get rid of Adam's car, but instead, Charlie pawns it to Kofi Jones, a member of the Desire street gang. As an alibi for Adam's hit and run, Michael reports the car stolen, leading to Kofi being arrested after running a red light in the vehicle. When part of Rocco's bike falls from its undercarriage, police charge Kofi with murder. Michael asks his former friend Lee to represent Kofi in court. Michael becomes upset by Adam revealing that he encountered many witnesses immediately following the hit and run.
3	3	"Part Three"	Edward Berger	Alison McDonald	December 20, 2020	0.537
Adam begins acting reckless and visits the site of the hit and run to photograph the crash scene, among other things. Lee begins working on Kofi's case and learns that he was tortured by the police when being questioned. Charlie expresses to Michael that they are in over their heads. Rocco's incarcerated brother Carlo is given permission to attend Rocco's funeral, at which Michael sees that Carlo is being transferred to Kofi's prison. He tries to arrange for Kofi's protection at the prison to no avail. Lee arranges for Kofi to be released due to lack of evidence, but on the night before his release, Kofi is transferred to Carlo's cell. Adam confesses to Frannie, his high school photography teacher with whom he is romantically involved, that he killed Rocco.
4	4	"Part Four"	Clark Johnson	David Matthews	December 27, 2020	0.467
Kofi is murdered in prison by Carlo, but the authorities do not treat it as suspicious. In result, Michael and Charlie choose to double down on the alibi they have concocted. Frannie fears that a disgruntled Adam, who gets suspended from school for starting a fight with a friend, will reveal their relationship. Michael and Lee tell Kofi's mother and family about his death. Gina Baxter, Jimmy Baxter's wife, pressures him to do more to avenge Rocco's death, and Fia Baxter, Jimmy's daughter, upsets her parents by no longer believing in God. Lee and Michael begin a romantic relationship. Elizabeth, Michael's mother-in-law, visits the Desiato home because she is suspicious of Michael and Adam and knows they did not visit Robin's grave on her anniversary. Nancy, a New Orleans detective, Charlie, and Lee join them for dinner and are discussing Kofi's arrest and murder when the dog finds a piece of bloodied clothing that Adam failed to discard. Michael distracts the groups attention but argues with Adam outside. In retaliation for the murder of Rocco Baxter, Kofi Jones' mother's house is blown up with the family inside. Kofi's younger brother, Eugene, is the lone survivor, who witnessed the explosion while walking home.
5	5	"Part Five"	Clark Johnson	Dewayne Darian Jones	January 3, 2021 (Note: "Part 5" was released early for streaming and on-demand on December 31, 2020, ahead of its Showtime Sunday premiere.)	0.563
During a session in court, Michael discovers he is being blackmailed by someone claiming to know that Adam killed Rocco and demands $222,000 from Michael. Carlo is released from prison, and Desire works to recruit Kofi's younger brother Eugene. Adam meets Fia in a restaurant and the two engage in deep conversation. The Baxter's meet with Big Mo, leader of the Desire gang, to discuss the murder and subsequent retaliation. Lee meets with Kofi's father to get his permission for an autopsy. Gina and Jimmy hear Adam's voice on a recording given to them by a corrupt police officer, Lt. Cusack, and discover that Michael deleted security camera footage at a gas station in an attempt to hide Adam's whereabouts on the day of Rocco's murder.
6	6	"Part Six"	Clark Johnson	Jennifer Cacicio	January 10, 2021	0.500
Michael asks for Nancy's help in his attempts to find his blackmailer. Jimmy enters the Desiato home and realizes Kofi is not behind the hit and run. Adam grows closer to Fia and the two begin dating unbeknownst to both Jimmy and Michael. Michael finds the blackmailer and works out a deal with him. Jimmy and Frankie, Jimmy's right-hand man, sit outside Michael's house waiting to ambush him, but are interrupted when Adam approaches the house after being dropped off by Fia. Carlo and his childhood best friend Joey want to get into the drug trade and meet with Desire to help with distribution. Lee talks to inmates to attempt to find out details of Kofi's death and discovers proof that Carlo killed Kofi. While Michael is meeting with his blackmailer Trevor, Jimmy and Frankie confront Michael, believing he killed Rocco. Michael allows them to believe he is responsible and also tells Jimmy about Carlo's upcoming arrest and promises to oversee the trial and ensure he is freed. Jimmy subsequently kills Trevor to instill fear into Michael.
7	7	"Part Seven"	Eva Sørhaug	Joey Hartstone	January 17, 2021	0.745
Nancy arrests Carlo and interrogates him for Kofi's murder. Michael is forced to dispose of Trevor's body with Frankie. Nancy realizes that the Baxters knew about Carlo's upcoming arrest ahead of time. Jimmy threatens to kill Michael should he not come through on his promise to help Carlo go free. Michael is assigned Carlo's preliminary hearing, but the murder case is assigned to Judge LeBlanc. Nancy grows suspicious of Lt. Cusack. Lee is fired for ignoring the orders of her boss to drop her obsession with the Kofi Jones case. Michael has drinks with Judge LeBlanc who is then arrested for drunk driving on the way home.
8	8	"Part Eight"	Eva Sørhaug	Frank Baldwin	January 31, 2021	0.662
Michael is eventually assigned Carlo's murder case after Judge LeBlanc steps down after her arrest video goes viral. Carlo's murder trial begins. Nancy goes to Michael with her suspicions about Lt. Cusack. Adam is accepted into New York University, but lies to Frannie and tells her that he wasn't. Jimmy gives Michael a deadline for helping Carlo's case. At the dinner to celebrate his acceptance into NYU, Adam expresses alternative plans he is considering. Frannie discovers Adam and Fia's relationship.
9	9	"Part Nine"	Eva Sørhaug	Jennifer Cacicio	February 7, 2021	0.582
Joey is on the run from the Baxters for being involved in the drug business with Desire. He is found while in a drug house but escapes and surrenders to police and agrees to testify against Carlo. Michael reveals to Nancy that his late wife was having an affair and that Adam doesn't know. Nancy inadvertently reveals to Jimmy that Fia's boyfriend is Michael's son. Michael allows Joey to testify, but spikes the water Joey was drinking with pills, causing him to overdose while on the witness stand. Frannie runs into Fia and Adam in a cafe and later confronts Adam. Lee discovers proof that Kofi could not have killed Rocco and that another corrupt police officer, Lt. Cunningham, has ties to Desire. Charlie confronts Frannie and warns her to stay away from Adam, but Frannie reveals to Charlie that Adam was the one who murdered Rocco.
10	10	"Part Ten"	Bryan Cranston	Peter Moffat	February 14, 2021	0.742
Elizabeth tells Adam about his mother's affair. Lee meets with Big Mo and tells her she knows that Kofi didn't kill Rocco. Carlo takes the stand in his trial and testifies he killed Kofi in self defense. Fiona, the lead prosecutor, disproves Carlo's story. Nancy, now aware that Michael is somehow involved in the murder of Rocco, confronts Michael about his and Adam's lie regarding when they visited Robin's gravesite. Charlie also tells Michael that he knows Adam killed Rocco. Charlie makes a deal with Nancy to not pursue Michael's involvement. Lee confronts Michael after discovering it was not possible for Kofi to have been the one to murder Rocco and learns from Michael that Adam killed him. Lee is overwhelmed by the corruption and ends her and Michael's relationship. Carlo is found not guilty after Michael bars Eugene from testifying. Fia invites Adam to a party at the hotel owned by the Baxter's to celebrate Carlo's not guilty verdict. Jimmy calls Michael to inform him he is not only aware of Adam and Fia's relationship, but that Adam was at the party. Jimmy ensures Michael cannot gain access to the hotel. Eugene acquires a gun and attempts to kill Carlo after sneaking into the hotel kitchen. However, he misses Carlo and shoots Adam instead, hitting him in the neck. Michael, who was looking in through a window, witnesses Adam get shot and rushes inside amidst the chaos. Adam experiences major blood loss and dies in Michael's arms.

=== Season 2 (2023) ===
No. overall	No. in season	Title	Directed by	Written by	Original release date	U.S. viewers (millions)
11	1	"Part Eleven"	Peter Sollett	Joey Hartstone	January 15, 2023	0.245
After the events of last season, Michael Desiato is in prison. Refusing to eat, he is involuntarily fed via nasogastric tube. In a flashback, Eugene escapes the party at Baxter's hotel after inadvertently shooting Adam. Carlo, pressured by Gina, tries to hunt down Eugene; he is caught by members of the Desire Gang but released on the orders of Big Mo. Eugene is soon found by Desire as well but is kept hidden from the Baxters. Another flashback shows that Michael confessed his role in Carlo's acquittal to Nancy, but that his confession has been buried by Olivia Delmont, an assistant U.S Attorney, who wishes instead to use Michael to take down the Baxter crime family. As part of her plan, she insists that Michael's imprisonment be publicly attributed to tax evasion so that Jimmy Baxter will not know Michael has implicated him. She visits him in prison and pressures him to work with her by threatening to use his confession to prosecute Charlie Figaro. Fia Baxter also visits Michael after writing him many letters that have gone unanswered. She wants to talk about Adam, but Michael tells her to leave him alone. Adam and Fia are shown to have had a baby. As the episode ends, Michael is released from prison at the behest of Olivia.
12	2	"Part Twelve"	Peter Sollett	Dani Vetere	January 22, 2023	0.255
Left homeless after becoming a free man, Michael stays with Elizabeth. He goes to City Hall to see Charlie but is told that he has been barred from the building. Olivia contacts him and arranges a job making deliveries for a butcher shop owned by someone who owes Michael a good turn. While making a delivery to Jimmy Baxter's hotel Michael sees Fia, who has moved into a suite there. Fia desperately wants to talk to Michael about Adam and asks Michael to meet "someone", to no avail. The Desire Gang finds that many of their customers are overdosing because their product has been cut with fentanyl; Little Mo is tasked with finding a new supplier in Houston. Gina attends a grief support group, where she struggles to interact with the other members. Her relationship with Jimmy remains tense because he takes no steps to avenge Eugene's shooting at the hotel, which has left Fia traumatized. Eugene, exiled to Houston by Little Mo, works at a coffee shop while going to a new school and staying with Little Mo's aunt. With the help of Charlie, Big Mo buys the bar across from Baxter's hotel, which attracts the attention of Gina. Michael learns that Fia has given birth to his grandson, named Rocco Adam Baxter.
13	3	"Part Thirteen"	Darren Grant	Oneika Barrett	January 29, 2023	0.253
Olivia knows about Michael's meeting with Fia and encourages Michael to exploit his new connection with the Baxter family. Charlie meets with Jimmy and Gina about a potential business deal, but refuses to approve the deal for them. Big Mo orders Little Mo to cancel the deal to buy drugs in Houston in order to facilitate closing the deal to buy the club. This causes Trey and Little Mo to fight during which the police were injured breaking it up. Eugene escapes, however, with the bag of cash intended for the deal. Jimmy tells Michael he would not have killed Adam if he had turned himself in. But, he admits to Frankie he would have killed him personally.
14	4	"Part Fourteen"	Darren Grant	Aalia Brown	February 5, 2023	0.289
Michael is invited to Jimmy's 50th birthday party and he asks Charlie to go with him. Big Mo's sister refuses to bail Little Mo and Trey out of jail. So, Big Mo tells Det. Cunningham to arrange Little Mo's release. At the party, Gina threatens Michael. Michael and Charlie witness the return of Gina's father Carmine Conti, a notable mob member. Jimmy becomes jealous of Fia and Michael's relationship. Little Mo is released. He finds out that Eugene has fled and the money is missing. Eugene shows up back in New Orleans at Big Mo's house with the bag of cash.
15	5	"Part Fifteen"	Peter Sollett	Kendall Sherwood	February 12, 2023	0.211
Following the confrontation with Frankie and Jimmy following the birthday party, Michael vows to stop helping Olivia with her case. Big Mo becomes angry with Little Mo for helping Eugene. Little Mo's supplier in Houston follows him back to New Orleans where Big Mo forces a meeting and he agrees to supply drugs to Desire. Nancy discovers a new lead in the case of the murder of Michael's wife. Michael confesses everything to Charlie. Charlie works with Olivia in agreeing to lease the waterfront land to the Baxters for development.
16	6	"Part Sixteen"	Peter Sollett	Dewayne Darian Jones	February 19, 2023	0.251
Nancy discovers that Michael's late wife Robin was having an affair and that Michael was not home the night of her murder as he said in his statement. Michael and Elizabeth confront the man Robin was sleeping with and follow a new lead he provided into Robin's murder. Gina and Fia meet with Father Jay about Rocco's baptism. The Baxters become aware that Eugene is alive and want to silence him. Eugene decides not to kill Carlo when he has the chance. Michael and Elizabeth discover from the lead that Det. Beckwith was behind Robin's murder. Jimmy enters into a dangerous partnership on the waterfront project with another mob family. A drug overdose causes the leadership of Desire to become divided. Det. Cunningham shoots Eugene as he tries to board a bus for Houston.
17	7	"Part Seventeen"	Carrie Preston	Bill Cain	February 26, 2023	0.288
After the shooting, Eugene goes to Lee for help who is forced to take him to the hospital. An increasingly desperate Det. Cunningham tracks Eugene down, but Eugene loudly announces his identity to the hospital and is arrested for Adam's murder. Big Mo's actions cause some of Desire's membership to start turning against her. Michael is kidnapped by Walter Beckwith who confesses to Robin's murder and that he had a partner before Nancy saves Michael by shooting Beckwith. From his phone, the two learn that he was working with Cunningham who admits to ordering the hit and that he was told of Robin's location by Charlie. He also admits that Charlie sent him to dispose of Adam's car after Rocco's death. Unwilling to go to prison, Cunningham commits suicide. Charlie admits to telling Cunningham where to find Robin, but insists that he was only trying to help her and had no idea that Cunningham was one of the cops that Robin was investigating. Jimmy becomes increasingly assertive even as Fia runs away, earning him Gina's ire. After getting advice from Jay, Fia turns to Michael for help.
18	8	"Part Eighteen"	Carrie Preston	Brandi Nicole	March 5, 2023	0.303
Fia is living with Michael at Elizabeth's house. Olivia wants Michael to help her case by getting Fia to provide evidence against her family, but then approaches Fia herself. Michael discourages Fia from helping her. Lee meets with the prosecutor who wants Eugene to testify against Desire in exchange for a lighter sentence. However, Lee threatens to blackmail the DA by leaking information about Michael's crimes that aren't known to the press. Upset with Big Mo's leadership and actions, Chris leads a robbery against Buffa's diner, vandalizing it in the process. Eugene escapes danger only to run headfirst into new jeopardy. Eugene refuses to accept any plea deal and insists on going to trial. Michael tells Olivia to leave Fia alone and he will take care of getting her information on the Baxters.
19	9	"Part Nineteen"	Rosemary Rodriguez	Marcus Dalzine	March 12, 2023	0.330
Eugene's trial begins. Chris approaches Little Mo about siding with him against Big Mo. Michael goes to see Jimmy who offers him the position as his advisor. Lee casts doubt on Gina's testimony. Little Mo sides with Big Mo during a meeting between Chris and their drug contact from Houston and she kills Chris. Fia confronts Jimmy about his mob activities and killing Eugene's family. Fia tells Jimmy about Olivia's investigation which prompts him to scrap the waterfront development project. Jenelle declines the ring that Big Mo offers her which causes her to consider selling the club. Lee tells Michael she wants him to lie if he is called to testify.
20	10	"Part Twenty"	Rosemary Rodriguez	Joey Hartstone	March 19, 2023	0.421
Big Mo offers to sell her jazz club to Jimmy in exchange for Desire's right to sell drugs in the French Quarter, but he rejects the deal. Michael is forced to testify at Eugene's murder trial, but he refuses to lie on Eugene's behalf. Instead, Michael tells the truth about everything, including the fact that Adam killed Rocco Baxter and his own coverup of it. During Eugene's testimony, prompted by Michael's recollection of Eugene's testimony at his mother's hearing, Lee brings out the fact that the Jones family's gas had been shut off for weeks, meaning that the death of Eugene's family couldn't have been a gas explosion. Michael and Eugene make amends with each other while Nancy begins an investigation into the murder of Eugene's family by the Baxters and Cusack's coverup of it. Sympathetic to Eugene's suffering, Olivia places him into the Witness Protection Program so that Eugene can have a new life. Fed up with her husband and her father, Gina manipulates Carmine into shooting Jimmy and then has him arrested for it, giving her control over the Baxter family. Although Jimmy survives the shooting, he is left hospitalized. Gina accepts Big Mo's deal on the condition that she not sell drugs on Gina's street. Devastated by all of the lies and unable to forgive her family, Fia leaves New Orleans for a new life after giving baby Rocco up for adoption through Father Jay so that Rocco can grow up away from the corruption of her family. With his own crimes publicly exposed, Michael is returned to prison to face punishment for his actions, content with his fate.

== Production ==
The series was first announced as being developed by CBS Studios in August 2017, with a series commitment in October 2017. Bryan Cranston was announced to headline the series in late January 2019. In August 2019, Michael Stuhlbarg, Sofia Black-D'Elia, Carmen Ejogo and Isiah Whitlock Jr. were added to the cast. In September 2019, Hope Davis was cast in a leading capacity, with Lilli Kay and Amy Landecker joining in a recurring role. Tony Curran, Keith Machekanyanga, Lamar Johnson and Benjamin Flores, Jr. were added in October 2019, with Margo Martindale joining in December 2019. In October 2020, Maura Tierney joined the cast in a recurring role.

Principal photography for the series began on September 16, 2019, in New Orleans, Louisiana, but was suspended in March 2020 due to the COVID-19 pandemic. Production resumed on October 7, 2020, and concluded on November 25, 2020. The series premiered on December 6, 2020 on Showtime.

On August 24, 2021, Showtime renewed the series for a second season. On July 5, 2022, it was reported that Cranston said that the second season would be its final season on Dax Shepard's Armchair Expert podcast. On the same day, it was also announced that filming for the second season has begun, and that Joey Hartstone had been named the new showrunner with Keith Machekanyanga promoted to a series regular for the second season. The following week, it was reported that Rosie Perez was cast in a recurring role while Andrene Ward-Hammond was promoted to as a series regular for the second season. On August 1, 2022, Jimi Stanton, Kay, and Flores were promoted as series regulars for the second season. On October 11, 2022, Mark Margolis and Mark O'Brien joined the cast in recurring capacities for the second season.

Filming for the second season began on July 18, 2022 and concluded on December 16, 2022 in New Orleans, Louisiana. The second season premiered on January 15, 2023 on Showtime.

== Reception ==
=== Critical response ===
For the first season, review aggregator Rotten Tomatoes reported an approval rating of 50% based on 50 critic reviews, with an average rating of 6.1/10. The website's critics consensus reads, "Bryan Cranston is powerful as yet another father with nothing to lose, but Your Honor too closely resembles other, better shows about good men doing bad things to warrant its relentlessly grim proceedings." Metacritic gave the first season a weighted average score of 60 out of 100 based on 29 critic reviews, indicating "mixed or average reviews".

On Rotten Tomatoes, the second season has an approval rating of 67% based 6 critic reviews, with an average rating of 6.5/10.

=== Ratings ===
==== Season 1 ====
Viewership and ratings per episode of Your Honor
No.	Title	Air date	Rating (18–49)	Viewers (millions)
1	"Part One"	December 6, 2020	0.04	0.449
2	"Part Two"	December 13, 2020	0.13	0.658
3	"Part Three"	December 20, 2020	0.07	0.537
4	"Part Four"	December 27, 2020	0.06	0.467
5	"Part Five"	January 3, 2021	0.08	0.563
6	"Part Six"	January 10, 2021	0.07	0.500
7	"Part Seven"	January 17, 2021	0.10	0.745
8	"Part Eight"	January 31, 2021	0.10	0.662
9	"Part Nine"	February 7, 2021	0.07	0.582
10	"Part Ten"	February 14, 2021	0.09	0.742

==== Season 2 ====
Viewership and ratings per episode of Your Honor
No.	Title	Air date	Rating (18–49)	Viewers (millions)
1	"Part Eleven"	January 15, 2023	0.05	0.245
2	"Part Twelve"	January 22, 2023	0.04	0.255
3	"Part Thirteen"	January 29, 2023	0.04	0.253
4	"Part Fourteen"	February 5, 2023	0.05	0.289
5	"Part Fifteen"	February 12, 2023	0.03	0.211
6	"Part Sixteen"	February 19, 2023	0.03	0.251
7	"Part Seventeen"	February 26, 2023	0.07	0.288
8	"Part Eighteen"	March 5, 2023	0.05	0.303
9	"Part Nineteen"	March 12, 2023	0.05	0.330
10	"Part Twenty"	March 19, 2023	0.08	0.421

=== Future ===
On July 5, 2022, it was reported that Cranston said that the second season would be its final season on Dax Shepard's Armchair Expert podcast. During a panel discussion hosted by Deadline in April 2023, Cranston indicated that his comments on the Armchair Expert podcast regarding the second season had been misconstrued, and that Showtime was "interested" in a third season, but that he might only be involved as a producer on future seasons.

On May 28, 2024, Cranston announced on X, formerly known as Twitter, that the series would become available to stream on Netflix beginning May 31. In July 2024, The New York Times reported that the series had become a sleeper hit on Netflix, becoming one of the most-viewed shows on the platform that year, performing particularly well with viewers over 35, as well as African-American and Hispanic audiences. In response to its success, new talks began to possibly revive the series for a third season.
