= Your Honor (2024 TV series) =

2024 South Korean television series

- Promotional poster
- Hangul: 유어 아너
- RR: Yueo aneo
- MR: Yuŏ anŏ
- Genre: Crime drama; Legal thriller
- Created by: Pyo Min-soo
- Based on: Kvodo by: Shlomo Mashiach; Ron Ninio
- Written by: Kim Jae-hwan
- Directed by: Yoo Jong-seon
- Starring: Son Hyun-joo; Kim Myung-min; Kim Do-hoon; Heo Nam-jun
- Music by: Kim Nam-yoon
- Country of origin: South Korea
- Original language: Korean
- No. of episodes: 10

Production
- Running time: 60 minutes
- Production companies: Takeone Studio; Monster Company

Original release
- Network: ENA; Genie TV
- Release: August 12 – September 10, 2024

Related
- Kvodo (2017–2019); Your Honor (2020–2023); Your Honor (2020–2021)

Your Honor (Korean: 유어 아너) is a 2024 South Korean crime drama legal thriller television series adapted from the Israeli television series Kvodo. The series is created by Pyo Min-soo, written by Kim Jae-hwan, directed by Yoon Jong-seon, and starring Son Hyun-joo, Kim Myung-min, Kim Do-hoon, and Heo Nam-jun. It aired on ENA from August 12, to September 10, 2024, every Monday and Tuesday at 22:00 (KST), and subsequently streaming on Genie TV. It is also available for streaming Viki in selected regions.

== Synopsis ==
A judge who covers up his son's murder and a criminal gang boss who chase his son's killer. A paternal instinct confrontation between two fathers who decide to become monsters for their children.

== Cast and characters ==
=== Main ===
- Son Hyun-joo as Song Pan-ho

A judge who is respected by everyone for his warm personality. He is a modern man with upright ideas and a righteous goal, leading a prosperous life free of flaws and fathering one child.

- Kim Myung-min as Kim Kang-heon

A cruel crime boss with a cold heart and an overwhelming presence, but was a loving father to his three children.

- Kim Do-hoon as Song Ho-young

Pan-ho's son, a genius among geniuses, grew up under an upright judge father and was admitted to Seoul National University at the top of his class. He is also a delicate and weak inner self. He was the culprit of a car accident that killed Kang-heon's second son Kim Sang-hyun, which led to the events of the series.

- Heo Nam-jun as Kim Sang-hyuk

Kang-heon's eldest son who inherited his father's violent and cruel personality. He is also the only one who shakes the composure of his cold-blooded father.

=== Supporting ===
- Jung Eun-chae as Kang So-young

A prosecutor who is not intimidated by powerful men and has a tenacity that does not let go once she bites.

- Park Se-hyun as Kim Eun

Kang-heon's youngest daughter who had a borderline intellectual disability but also a pure-hearted and innocent girl, and the Kim family's apple of the eye. She later became Ho-young's girlfriend, without knowing he was responsible for the killing of her second brother.

- Ha Su-ho as Park Chang-hyuk

The loyal right-hand man of Kang-heon and a person who is sure to handle the work he is given.

- Jung Ae-yeon as Ma Ji-young

Kang-heon's wife and Sang-hyuk and Eun's mother.

- Park Ji-yeon as Jang Chae-rim

A violent crimes detective with an upright personality who becomes involved in the incident that occurs between Pan-ho and Kang-heon.

- Choi Moo-sung as Jung Yi-hwa

A member of the National Assemby, who is Pan-ho's close friend.

- Baek Joo-hee as Jo Mi-yeon

Boss of Budu gang.

- Ahn Nae-sang as Kang Moon-seok

The Chief of Staff of the Blue House, who plans to make Pan-ho a politician.

== Production ==
=== Development ===
On April 28, 2022, Takeone Studio, a comprehensive content production company, announced that it had signed a contract with Yes Studio, an Israeli content production company, to produce a Korean remake of Kvodo with Monster Company.

On February 16, 2023, it was reported that Pyo Min-soo PD, who directed Iris II: New Generation (2013), The Producers (2015), and The Third Charm (2018), would direct the series. On May 18, KT Studio Genie confirmed that the series was part of their 2024 drama line-up.

On May 22, 2024, it was confirmed that Pyo would be the creator of the series while Yoo Jong-seon, who directed Designated Survivor: 60 Days (2019), Secret Royal Inspector & Joy (2021), and Pale Moon (2023) and Kim Jae-hwan, who wrote Boyhood (2023), helmed as director and writer, respectively.

=== Casting ===
On February 16, 2023, Yoon Chan-young was reportedly cast for the series. On May 18, Son Hyun-joo and Kim Myung-min were confirmed to lead the drama adaptation. On August 14, Jung Eun-chae was reportedly cast.

On May 27, 2024, Kim Do-hoon and Heo Nam-jun were confirmed to appear.

=== Filming ===
Principal photography began in the first half of 2023.

== Release ==
KT Studio Genie announced that Your Honor would air between second and third quarter of 2024. The series was confirmed to broadcast on August 12, 2024, at 22:00 (KST) on Genie TV, Genie TV Mobile, and ENA, respectively. It is also available to stream on Viki in selected regions.

== Viewership ==
Your Honor : South Korea viewers per episode (thousands)

Season	Episode number										Average
Season	1	2	3	4	5	6	7	8	9	10	Average
1	369	561	678	784	823	899	796	907	928	1235	798

Source: Audience measurement performed nationwide by Nielsen Korea.

Average TV viewership ratings
Ep.	Original broadcast date	Average audience share (Nielsen Korea)	
Ep.	Original broadcast date	Nationwide	Seoul
1	August 12, 2024	1.736% (5th)	1.900% (2nd)
2	August 13, 2024	2.837% (2nd)	2.974% (2nd)
3	August 19, 2024	3.406% (1st)	3.673% (1st)
4	August 20, 2024	3.667% (1st)	3.654% (1st)
5	August 26, 2024	3.880% (1st)	3.720% (2nd)
6	August 27, 2024	4.334% (1st)	4.874% (1st)
7	September 2, 2024	3.741% (2nd)	3.992% (2nd)
8	September 3, 2024	4.654% (1st)	4.560% (1st)
9	September 9, 2024	4.551% (1st)	4.495% (1st)
10	September 10, 2024	6.053% (1st)	6.441% (1st)
Average		3.886%	4.028%
In the table above, the blue numbers represent the lowest ratings and the red numbers represent the highest ratings.; This drama airs on a cable channel/pay TV which normally has a relatively smaller audience compared to free-to-air TV/public broadcasters (KBS, SBS, MBC, and EBS).
