= Your Honor (2021 TV series) =

- Genre: Crime drama
- Written by: Aleksey Bezenkov; Ekaterina Mavromatis; Shlomo Moshiah; Ron Ninio; Maksim Romantsov
- Directed by: Konstantin Statsky
- Starring: Oleg Menshikov; Aleksey Serebryakov; Vladislav Miller; Olga Tumaykina; Darya Ursulyak; Daniil Vorobyov
- Composer: Pavel Esenin
- No. of seasons: 1
- No. of episodes: 8

Production
- Cinematography: Dayan Gaytkulov

Original release
- Network: more.tv Wink

Your Honor (Russian: Ваша честь) is a 2021 Russian crime drama television series directed by Konstantin Statsky. It stars Oleg Menshikov. It is based on the Israeli television series Kvodo.

== Plot ==
The series follows a renowned, honest, and incorruptible judge named Mikhail Romanov. He sincerely believes that the law is paramount, but everything changes when he learns that his son, driving a car without permission, hit a motorcyclist.

== Cast ==
- Oleg Menshikov as Mikhail Romanov
- Aleksey Serebryakov as Razin
- Vladislav Miller
- Olga Tumaykina as Olga Tumaykina
- Darya Ursulyak as Dina Minayeva
- Daniil Vorobyov as Kirill
