= Anna Klas =

Estonian pianist (1912–1999)

Anna Klas (born Anna Gurevitš; 23 January 1912 – 20 April 1999) was an Estonian pianist and pedagogue.

Anna Klas was born in Riga into a Jewish family. Since on the second half of 1930s, she started her solo career. Famous was her duo with Bruno Lukk. This collaboration started in 1940s and lasted over 40 years.

She was also a pedagogue. Since 1940 she taught at the Tallinn Conservatory. Students included: Toivo Peäske, Laine Mets, Virve Lippus, Ada Kuuseoks, Vilma Mallene, Viiva Väinmaa, Valdur Roots, Helju Agur, Aime Karm and others. From 1944 until 1959, she taught at the Tallinn State Music School (an associate professor since 1946). From 1966 until 1979, she was a lecturer at the Riga Conservatory in Latvia.

In 1938, she married Eduard Klas. Their son was conductor Eri Klas. In 1941, after the occupation of Estonia by German troops, Eduard Klas was arrested and executed due to his Jewish origins. Anna Klas escaped the Holocaust by being in the Ural Mountains from 1941 until 1943, as part of the National Art Ensembles of the Estonian SSR, and staying in Yaroslavl from 1943 until 1944.

== Acknowledgements ==
- Meritorious Artist of the Estonian SSR (1946)
- Soviet Estonia Award (1947)
