= Yevgeny Aryeh =

Israeli theatre director (1947–2022)

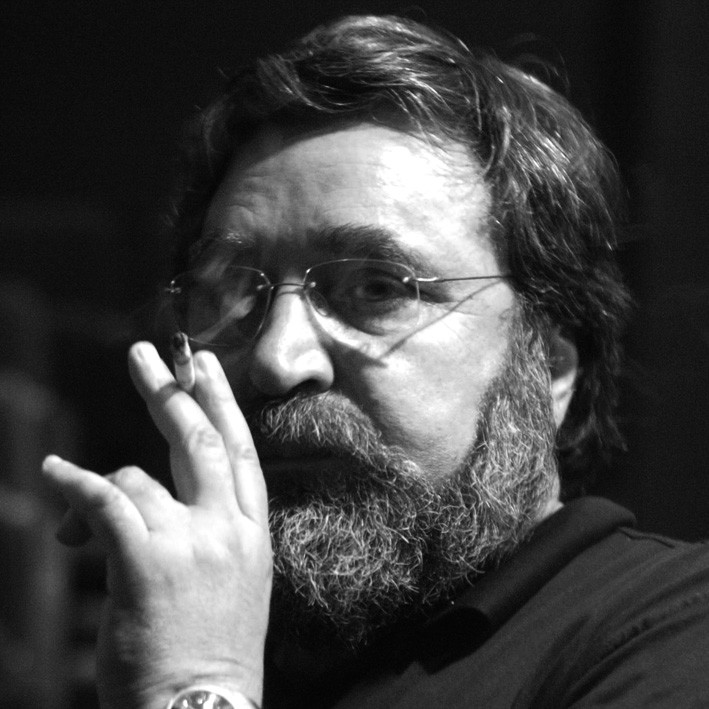
- Born: Евгений Михайлович Арье; Evgeniy Mikhaylovich Arye; 28 November 1947; Moscow, Russian SFSR, USSR
- Died: January 19, 2022 (aged 74); New York City, U.S.
- Occupations: Theater director, playwright, scriptwriter, and set designer
- Known for: Theater director for the Gesher Theater
- Awards: Stanislavski Prize for theatre

Yevgeny Arye (or Yevgeni, Russian: Евгений Арье, Hebrew: יבגני אריה; 28 November 1947 – 19 January 2022) was an Israeli theater director, playwright, scriptwriter, and set designer.

== Career ==
In the Soviet Union, Aryeh was a veteran theater and television director.

Aryeh was the theater director for the Gesher Theater, in Tel Aviv, Israel, and noted for his "special vision". Gesher was founded in 1991 by Russian immigrants headed by Aryeh.

In 2001, Aryeh was nominated for the Israel Theater Prize for playwright, for Satan in Moscow. In 2003, he received nominations as director, scriptwriter, and set designer for an Israeli Theater Award for the production of Isaac Bashevis Singer's love story The Slave.

In 2005, Aryeh was voted the 170th-greatest Israeli of all time, in a poll by the Israeli news website Ynet to determine whom the general public considered the 200 Greatest Israelis.

In 2009, he was a winner of the Yuri Shtern Prize for New Immigrant Artists, awarded by Israeli Absorption Minister, then Eli Aflalo. That same year, Yevgeny Arye won the prestigious Stanislavski international prize for theatre in Russia for his production of Isaac Bashevis Singer's story, Enemies, a Love Story

== Personal life and death ==
Aryeh fell ill in November 2021. He died during an operation in a clinic in New York City, on 19 January 2022, at the age of 74. He was buried at Rose Hills Memorial Park in Putnam Valley three days later.
