= Ilanit Ben-Yaakov =

Israeli actress

- אילנית בן-יעקב
- Born: Ilanit Ben-Yaakov; March 20, 1973 (age 52); Beersheba, Israel
- Occupation: Actress
- Years active: 2002–present

Ilanit Ben-Yaakov (Hebrew: אילנית בן-יעקב; born March 20, 1973) is an Israeli actress.

== Biography ==
Ilanit Ben-Yaakov was born on March 20, 1973, in Beersheba. In 1997, she started studying at the School of Visual Theater in Jerusalem. She had her first lead role in the 2002 film Was Great. She has played a number of supporting roles in Israeli films and television series.

== Filmography ==
Title	Year	Role	Notes
Haya Nehedar	2003		TV movie
Close to Home	2005	Captain Dubek's assistant	
Bsorot Tovot	2006	Rona	TV series
Miluim	2006		TV series
Tom Avni 24/7	2007	Tamima	TV series
Tehilim	2007	Orna	
Jellyfish	2007	Galia	
It All Begins at Sea	2008	Tirtze	
Exposed	2008	Riki	TV series
Golden Girls	2011	Naomi	TV series
Home Front	2011		Short film
Alice	2012	Alice	
Yom Haem	2012	Ruthi	TV series
Zaguri	2014	Mrs. Seroussi	TV series
Hounds	2015		Short
Inertia	2015	Mira	
The Exchange Principle	2016	Racheli	TV series
Viki and Me	2017	Navit	TV series
Echo	2018	Keren	
Your Honor	2019	Hanit	TV series
Fifty	2019	Alona Nahmias	TV series
Possessions	2020	Doctor	TV series
HaYoreshet	2021		TV series
Barren	2022		
Shumakom	2022		TV series
