= Iton 77 =

Israeli literature and culture magazine

Iton 77 עיתון 77
- Categories: Culture magazine Literature magazine
- Frequency: Monthly
- First issue: 1977; 49 years ago
- Country: Israel
- Language: Hebrew
- Website: Official Site
- ISSN: 1565-253X
- OCLC: 32234140

Iton 77 (Hebrew: עיתון 77) is an Israeli monthly literature and culture magazine published in Israel.

== History and profile ==
Iton 77 was established by the poet and editor Jacob Besser in 1977. The magazine also owns a small publishing company under the same name, which mostly publishes volumes of poetry.

== See also ==
- List of literary magazines
