= Gesher Theatre =

Israeli theatre company

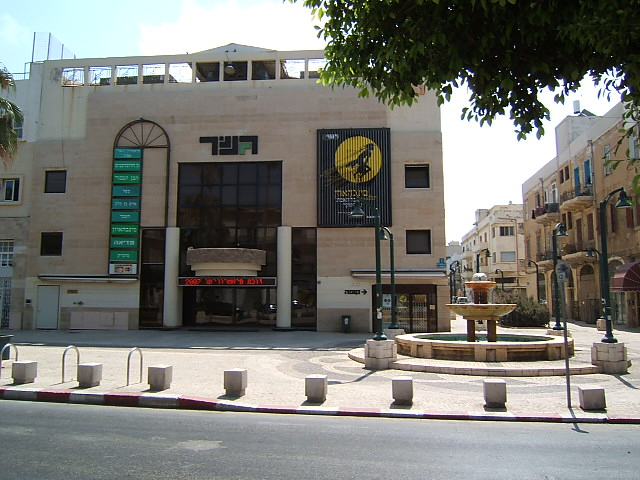
Noga Hall - 'Gesher' residence

Gesher Theatre is an Israeli theatre company based in Jaffa founded in 1991 by a group of actors from the former Soviet Union, under the artistic leadership of Yevgeny Aryeh. The company stages performances in both Russian and Hebrew.

== History ==
Gesher Theatre was founded in Israel in 1991 with the support of several institutions and government agencies, including the Ministry of Education, the Jewish Agency, and the City of Tel Aviv. Led by director Yevgeny Aryeh, Gesher was established by a group of actors who had immigrated from the former Soviet Union. The theatre is known for its bilingual performances, with the same troupe performing in both Russian and Hebrew. Although it began with a Russian-speaking cast, most of its productions are now staged in Hebrew.

The theatre's permanent residence, the Noga Theatre, is located in Jaffa. The premises were donated by the City of Tel Aviv-Yafo on the theatre's 8th anniversary.

== Productions ==
In April 1991, the Gesher Theatre staged its first production of Tom Stoppard’s Rosencrantz and Guildenstern Are Dead. The play was chosen to represent Israeli theater in New York in January 1992 and performed again at the 1993 Festival d'Avignon.

In September 1992, Gesher staged Molière’s play The Misanthrope in Hebrew at a festival in Zürich.

In 1994, the theater staged Adam Resurrected, written by Alexander Chervinsky and based on the novel of the same name by Yoram Kaniuk.

In 1996, Gesher Theatre debuted Village, an original play by Yehoshua Sobol, which was set on a settlement which existed before the establishment of the State of Israel. Village won five Israel Theater Prizes, including Best Play, Best Director, Best Actor, Best Set Design, and Best Lighting Design.

Gesher's production of City – Odessa Stories, based on stories by Isaac Babel, was invited to the Kennedy Center in Washington and was featured during celebrations marking the 50th anniversary of the State of Israel.
