= Mehmet Ali Vrioni =

Albanian politician

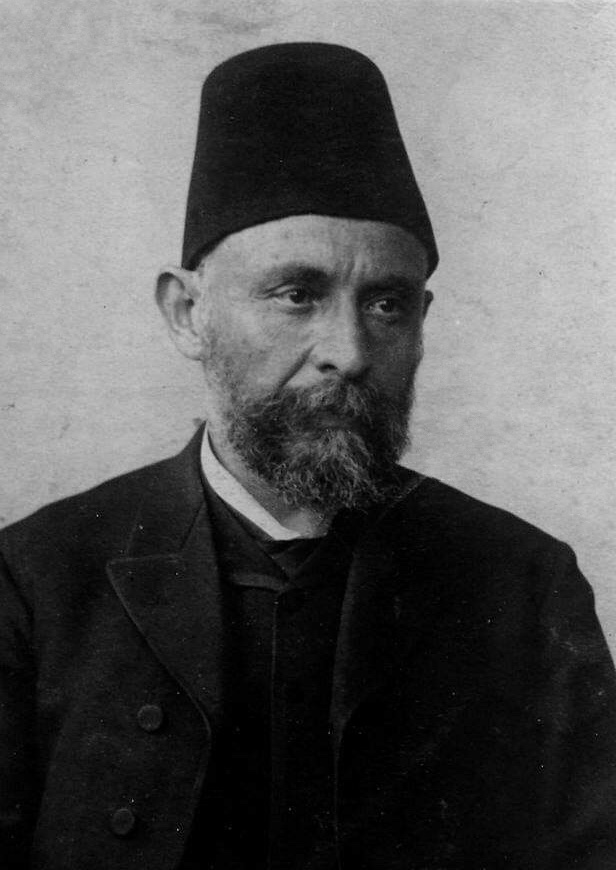
- Born: 1842; Berat, Ottoman Empire (modern Albania)
- Died: 1895 (aged 52–53)
- Spouse: Hysnije Vokopola
- Children: Ilias Vrioni (son)
- Relatives: Jusuf Vrioni (grandson)

Mehmet Ali Vrioni was an Albanian politician and the vice president of the League of Prizren.

== Life ==
Mehmet Ali Bey was from the famous landowning bey family of Berat named Vrioni.

In 1877 he became one of the founders of the Central Committee for Defending Albanian Rights. It was founded in Istanbul in 1877, with a view of obtaining some autonomy for the Albanians in the Ottoman Empire. He was also a founding member of the Committee of Janina which took place in the same year. In 1879 he and Abdyl Frashëri left Preveza, and traveled to Paris, Rome, Vienna and Berlin to seek support for the Albanian cause and submit a memorandum of Albanian demands to the Great Powers. This was the most important effort to promote the rights of the Albanian nation during this period.

He had three wives throughout his life, with Hysinje Vokopola (who was from the village of Vokopole, and a relative of Ferid Vokopola) he fathered his only son Ilias Vrioni. His third wife was a Circassian from Tuapse and her sister Behixhe Hamza is the mother of Mufid Libohova. His grandson is Jusuf Vrioni. He and his family spoke the Albanian language in the Tosk dialect.
