= Central Committee for Defending Albanian Rights =

Committee favouring an autonomous Albanian region (founded 1877)

The Central Committee for Defending Albanian Rights (Albanian: Komiteti Qendror për Mbrojtjen e të Drejtave Shqiptare, Turkish: Arnavut Haklarını Savunmak Merkez Komitesi) was formed in the city of Istanbul, Turkey, then Ottoman Empire on December 18, 1877, by an influential group of Albanian intellectuals, patriots, and politicians, such as Hasan Tahsini, Abdyl Frashëri, Vesel Dino, Iljaz Pasha Dibra, Ymer Prizreni, Sami Frashëri, Zija Prishtina, Ahmet Koronica, Mehmet Ali Vrioni, Said Toptani, Mustafa Nuri Vlora, Pashko Vasa, Jani Vreto, Mihal Harito, Pandeli Sotiri, Koto Hoxhi, and Mane Tahiri. The chairman of the committee was elected Abdyl Frashëri. The committee would be referred later with a more practical name as Komiteti i Stambollit ("Istanbul Committee").

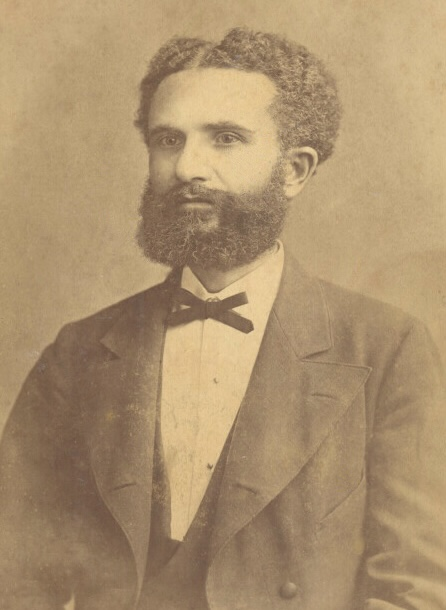
Abdyl bey Frasheri, Chairman of the Albanian Committee 1877

The goal of the committee was to disseminate the idea of an autonomous Albanian region within the steadily diminishing Ottoman Empire. The committee's plan and ideals were printed in the Tercuman i Sark paper, and anticipated the founding of a single Albanian vilayet that would encompass the vilayets of Kosovo, Monastir, Janina and Scutari. Contrary to what is often said, a claim for territories very often included the Salonica Vilayet too. As support for both the committee and the idea of a united autonomous Albania grew, supporters decided to meet in the city of Prizren. This became the first meeting of what came to be known as the League of Prizren.

In October 1879, elite members of the committee formed the Society for the Publication of Albanian Letters, which would perform the difficult tasks of establishing a unified alphabet and primer, and spreading the Albanian writings.

== See also ==
- Albanian Committee of Janina
- League of Prizren
- Convention of Dibra
