= Kararname =

Kararname is a Turkish word for a proclamation, or a government decree, and may refer to:

- Kararname (League of Prizren), Issued by the Prizren League in 1878
