= Convention of Dibra =

The Convention of Dibra was organized on November 1, 1878, in the city of Dibra, on the initiative of the Committee of the Albanian League for the two Dibras chaired by Iljaz Pasha Dibra. The convention adopted a resolution in the form of a memorandum, drafted by Abdyl Frashëri who participated as representative of the whole of Vilayet of Ioannina.

It contained the same requests that were included in the Istanbul Committee's program, summarized in five sections. The requests included the formation of the Vilayet of Albania, the development of Albanian-language education infrastructure, and the usage of a large part of the budget for the advancement of educational and cultural activities. At the end of the resolution it was stated that these requests would be presented within a month on behalf of all Albanian people to the Sublime Porte by a chosen delegation. According to the agreement, the delegation that would present and defend the resolution before the Sublime Porte would consist of 14 prominent Albanians, including Iljaz Pasha Dibra, Sheh Mustafa Tetova, Hasan Pasha Prizren, Mustafa Pasha Vlora, Abedin Bey Dino, Mehmet Ali Vrioni, Sabri Gjirokastra, Mihal Kristo and Abdyl Frashëri. However, the delegation did not do so and plans were changed due to situation in Chameria, which was being claimed by Greece.

== See also ==
- League of Prizren

== Sources ==
- Buda, Aleks (1979). Konferenca Kombëtare e Studimeve për Lidhjen Shqiptare të Prizrenit, 1878-1881: 12-28 qershor 1978. Akademia e Shkencave e RPS të Shqipërisë, Instituti i Historisë.
- Pollo, Stefanaq (1983). Historia e Shqipërisë: Vitet 30 të shek. XIX-1912. Akademia e Shkencave e RPS të Shqipërisë, Instituti i Historisë.
- Pulaha, Selami (2003). Historia e popullit shqiptar në katër vëllime: Shqiptarët gjatë luftës së dytë botërore dhe pas saj, 1939-1990. Botimet Toena. ISBN 9789994314522.
