= Ymer Prizreni =

Albanian politician, cleric, jurist, diplomat (c.1820–1887)

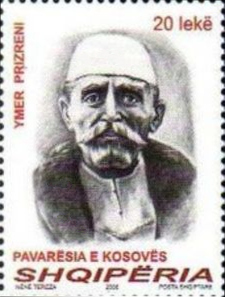
- Prizreni on a 2008 stamp of Albania
- Born: c. 1820; Zgatar, Opojë, Ottoman Empire
- Died: 12 June 1887; Ulcinj, Principality of Montenegro
- Other names: Müderris Haxhí Ymer Effendi Prizreni; Müderris Ymer Prizreni; Ymer Drini; Ymer bey Prizreni
- Organization(s): Central Committee for Defending Albanian Rights, League of Prizren
- Movement: Albanian Vilayet, National Renaissance of Albania
- Spouse: Fatime Murat Aga
- Relatives: Sylejman Ali Nuhi (Father)

Haxhi Ymer bey Effendi Prizreni or Ymer Drini (c. 1820 – 12 June 1887) was an Ottoman-Albanian 'alim, hoxha and the political leader of the League of Prizren. He was Prime Minister of its Autonomous Provisional Government, formed in the period 1880–1881.

== Life ==
He was born around 1820, descending from a family of müderris, landlords in the area of Zgatar, near Prizren and nearby. He was the son of Müderris Sylejman Ali Nuhi. His grandfather was Müderris Ali Nuhi, known in the region of Opojë as founder of the first mosque in Zgatari, on 10 May 1814. It is not known when his father Sylejman settled in Prizren. Sylejman served as Imam in the Bajrakli Mosque, owner of land, stores and mills in Prizren area. All three sons Ali, Ymer and Osman received high education. The only descendants of the family today come from Ymer's brother Ali.

Ymer followed elementary and middle education in his town. Then he went to Istanbul where he studied Islamic theology and jurisdiction. After the studies he worked in the madrasa of Prizren, where he distinguished himself as a main supporter of the lower classes against the injustices of the corrupt 19th-century Ottoman administration. Once the Russo-Turkish War started off in (1877–1878), he set up together with other Albanian leaders, to work for the protection of Albania's territorial integrity and to seek its national rights in international level. He organised self-defence committee for the Sanjak of Prizren and elsewhere, and organised other committees that were formed in Kosovo.

== League of Prizren ==
In 1877 he was elected member of the first Ottoman Parliament (1876–1878). In the same year he became a member and a founder of the Central Committee for Defending Albanian Rights (Albanian: Komiteti Shqiptar i Stambollit) which was formed under the chairmanship of Abdyl Frashëri, whom he was connected for the rest of his life. In the spring of 1878, he chaired the committee that organised in Prizren General Assembly meeting, who founded the Albanian League. In October 1879 he was elected chairman of the League, and in January 1881, and the head of the Autonomous Provisional Government. As its chairman, he directed political activity that led to the establishment of the Vilayet of Albania, administration and organisation of armed resistance against the Ottoman armies which were coming to crush it in the spring of 1881. After suppression of the League of Prizren, Ymer Prizren escaped from falling into the hands of the Ottoman authorities and to refuse the submission, by settling in Ulcinj. He was not subdued nor his Albanian ideology, and died in Ulcinj where his tomb still lies. He was allegedly murdered and all his archive of documents was stolen.
