= Assembly of Preveza =

1879 meeting of Albanian delegates

The Assembly of Preveza (Albanian: Kuvendi i Prevezës, Greek: Συνέλευση Πρέβεζας, romanized: Synélefsi Prévezas) was a meeting of Albanian delegates from 11 to 13 January 1879, in Preveza, Ottoman Empire, aiming to halt the annexation of Epirus by Greece, following the Congress of Berlin.

The assembly, organized locally by the Albanian Committee of Preveza, a branch of the League of Prizren, was composed mainly from 200 Cham and Lab Albanian leaders, while in the last day of the meeting, it was completed with Northern Albanian delegates reaching the town, making the total numbers of delegates to 400.

The decisions of the Assembly were to create lobbying committees, which would halt the Ottoman Empire to give Epirus to Greece, while it was agreed that Thessaly should be given to Athens administration.

The final demarcation of the border was to take place at Preveza by the delegates of Greece and the Ottoman Empire, on 6 February 1879, while the delegates and a part of the population demonstrated against any move of this demarcation inside Epirus.

At the end, the two forces reached a conclusion to include in Greece, only Arta, leaving the rest of Epirus under the Ottoman Empire.

== See also ==
- Congress of Berlin
- Treaty of San Stefano
- Russo-Turkish War (1877–1878)
