= Albanian Committee of Janina =

Organization defending Albanian rights (founded 1877)

The Albanian Committee of Janina (Albanian: Komiteti Shqiptar i Janinës, Greek: Η Αλβανική Επιτροπή Ιωαννίνων), was an Albanian organization of the 19th century with the aim of defending Albanian rights.

The Albanian Committee of Janina was formed in May 1877 in Janina then a city of the Ottoman Empire in the Vilayet of Janina, by prominent Muslim Albanian personalities of the Vilayet and central figures of the Albanian National Awakening. Abdyl Frashëri from Përmet, Abedin Dino from Preveza, Mehmet Ali Vrioni from Berat, Vesel Dino from Preveza, and other notable members of the Vilayet's Albanian community.

As no political decisions, documents or an official seal were issued, the group was not an organized committee functioning as a political organization, but a group of Tosk Albanians interested in the Albanian national movement having similar ideas about the future of Albanians.

== See also ==
- Albanian National Awakening
- League of Prizren
- Convention of Dibra
