= Kararname (League of Prizren) =

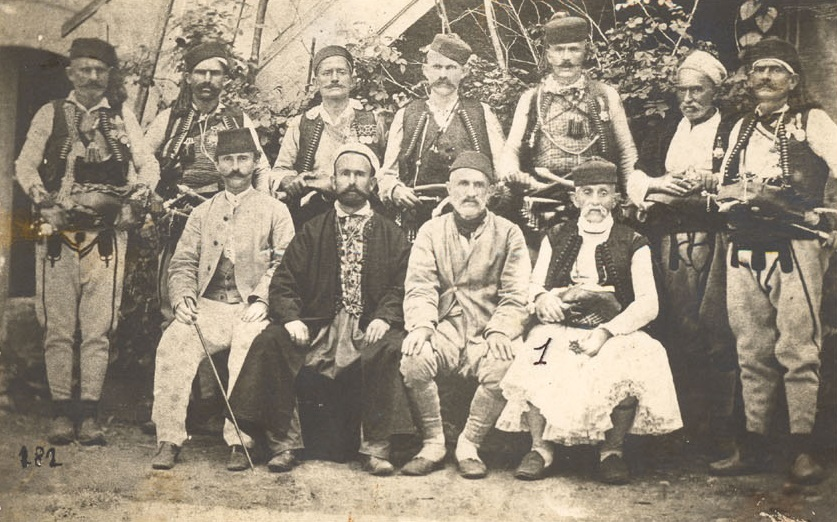
- Group photo of some of the delegates

Prizren Committee for National Defence
- Long title: Kararname of Prizren Committee for National Defence
- Enacted by: Prizren Committee for National Defence
- Enacted: June 18, 1878

Related legislation
- Ottoman Empire

Summary
- announcement that the people from the "northern Albania, Epirus and Bosnia" are willing to defend the "territorial integrity" of the Ottoman Empire "by all possible means" from the troops of the Bulgaria, Serbia and Montenegro

The Kararname ("Decree") of Prizren Committee for National Defence is the name of the decree (the Book of Decisions) signed by 47 Muslim deputies from the districts of Prizren, Yakova (present-day Gjakova), Ipek (present-day Peć), Gucia, Yeni Pazar (present-day Novi Pazar), Sjenica, Pljevlja, Mitrovica, Vučitrn, Pristina, Gnjilane, Skopje, Kalkandelen (present-day Tetovo), Kičevo, Gostivar, and Lower Dibra (present-day Peshkopi) and Upper Dibra (present-day Debar) on June 18, 1878. The original text, written on Ottoman Turkish, is missing. Around 300 Muslims participated on the assembly, including delegates from Bosnia and mutasarrif (sanjakbey) of the Sanjak of Prizren as representative of the Ottoman authorities.

== Etymology ==
Kararname is a word from Turkish language, and means decree or the government approved decision of the president. Origins of the word are Persian; karar (gharār; قرار in Persian) meaning stability, and Name (Nāmeh; نامه in Persian) meaning letter.

== Background ==
The Prizren Committee for National Defence delegates assembled in Prizren on June 10, 1878, and submitted an eighteen-page memorandum to Benjamin Disraeli the British representative at the Congress of Berlin, on June 13, 1878.

== Text and signatories of the Kararname ==
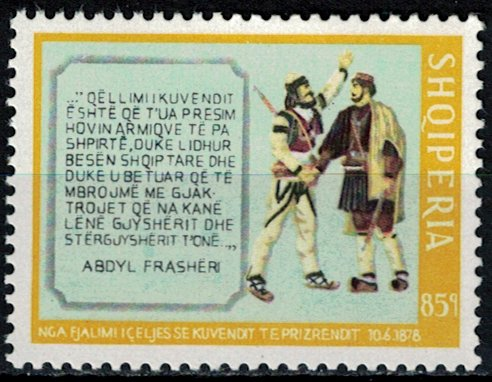
1968 Albanian stamp depicting the Proclamation of Prizren

The Kararname represents an initial position, mainly supported by landlords and individuals related to the Ottoman administration, which is also reflected in an early name of the group (The Committee of True Muslims, Albanian: Komiteti i Myslimanëve të Vërtetë). The text of the kararname composed on the first meeting of the league was not based on the nationalistic but the religious solidarity. It said nothing about the reforms, nothing about the schools, nothing about the autonomy or about the union of the Albanian population within one, Albanian vilayet. The participants wanted to return to the status quo before the start of Russo-Turkish War of 1877–1878. The main aim was to defend from immediate dangers. Soon that position changed radically and resulted in demands of autonomy and open war against the Ottoman Empire.

The text of Kararname had 16 articles. Basically the text contained announcement that the people from the "northern and southern Albania, and Bosnia" are willing to defend the "territorial integrity" of the Ottoman Empire "by all possible means" from the troops of the Bulgaria, Serbia and Montenegro. It was signed by 47 Muslim deputies of the Prizren Committee for National Defence on June 18, 1878. Around 300 Muslims participated on the assembly, including delegates from Bosnia and mutasarrif (sanjakbey) of the Sanjak of Prizren as representative of the central authorities, and no delegates from Scutari Vilayet.

== Aftermath ==
Kararname served to promote a new agenda of Albanian National Awakening composed by Abdyl Frashëri on a key assembly of landowners at the Bektashi monastery of his native village of Frashër, and adopted by League of Prizren on November 27, 1878. It was not an appeal for Albanian independence, or even autonomy within Ottoman Empire but, as proposed by Pashko Vasa, simply the unification of all Albanian speaking territory within one vilayet.

== See also ==
- Prizren League
- Albanian National Awakening
