= Albanian Vilayet =

Vilayet of the Ottoman Empire projected in 1912 in the western Balkan Peninsula

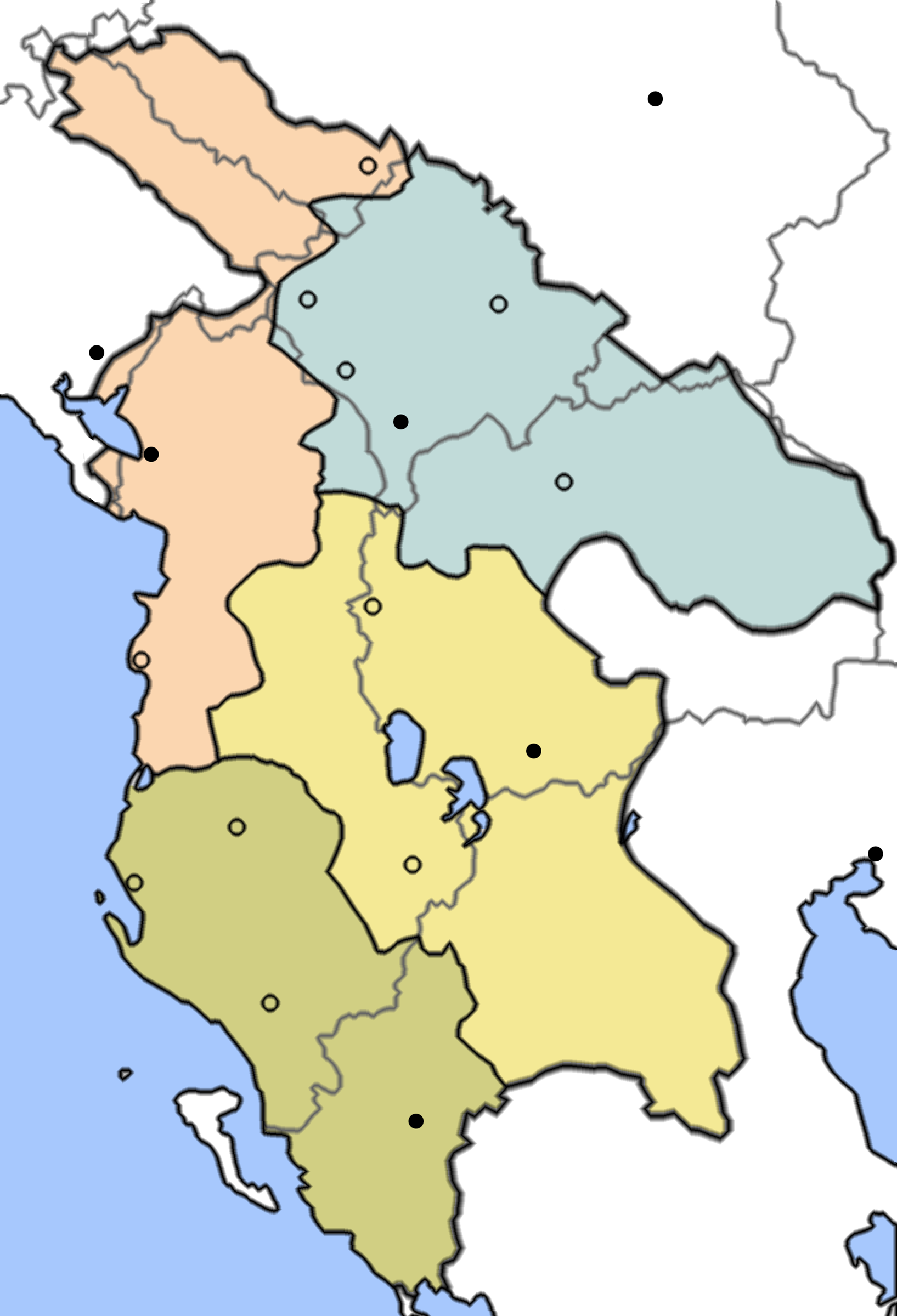
The four Ottoman vilayets in a single map over the present day borders (vilayet of İşkodra, Yannina, Monastir and Kosovo as proposed by the League of Prizren for full autonomy)

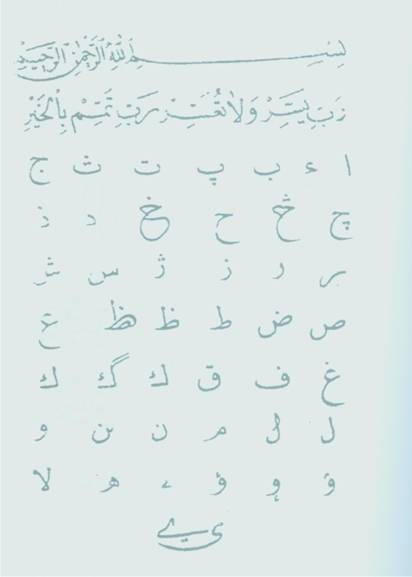
Albanian Abjad script alphabet called Elifbaja, from the Ottoman period.

The Albanian Vilayet (Ottoman Turkish: ولايت ارناود, Vilâyet-i Arnavid) was a projected vilayet of the Ottoman Empire in the western Balkan Peninsula, which was to include the four Ottoman vilayets with substantial ethnic Albanian populations: Kosovo Vilayet, Scutari Vilayet, Manastir Vilayet, and Janina Vilayet. In some proposals, it included the Salonica Vilayet as well. The creation of the Vilayet was confirmed in September 1912, but negotiations were interrupted a month later in October by the beginning of the First Balkan War. Plans for an Albanian Vilayet were lost with the Partition of Albania.

A separate Albanian vilayet was a part of the agenda of many Albanian organizations and societies since 1877, during the period known as the Albanian National Awakening. Establishment of such a vilayet was agreed between the Albanian rebels and the authorized representatives of the Ottoman government on 4 September 1912, following the Albanian Revolt of 1912. Soon after that agreement however, the First Balkan War broke out and most of the remaining European territory of the Ottoman Empire was occupied by the Balkan League member states. After the army of the Kingdom of Serbia captured Skopje, Ismail Qemali invited a group of Albanians from all four Ottoman vilayets that were agreed to be united into the Albanian Vilayet, to attend an All-Albanian Congress in Valona. There they declared independence on 28 November 1912, and set up the Provisional Government of Albania.

The same territories were claimed by nations in the region that had already raised their national development to independent statehood: Shkodër vilayet was claimed by the Serbs and Montenegrins, Kosovo vilayet by the Serbs, Montenegrins and Bulgarians, Monastir vilayet by the Serbs, Greeks and Bulgarians and Janina Vilayet by the Greeks. A few weeks after the beginning of the First Balkan War, the biggest part of the territories intended for the Albanian Vilayet was in the hands of Balkan League member states, as a condominium. Final frontiers between the Balkan League members and the new Principality of Albania were decided by the treaties of London and Bucharest, and ignored the frontiers of the proposed Albanian Vilayet, leaving substantial Albanian populations living outside the newly established Albanian nation-state.

== Events ==
=== Central Committee for Defending Albanian Rights ===
The Central Committee for Defending Albanian Rights was organization established in the city of Istanbul, Turkey, then Ottoman Empire in 1877 by an influential group of Albanian intellectuals, patriots, and politicians, such as Sami Frashëri, Vaso Pasha, Abdyl Frashëri and many others. The chairman of the Committee was Abdyl Frashëri.

This Committee published the idea for uniting the vilayets of Monastiri, Scutari, Kosovo and Janina into one Albanian vilayet in the paper Tercüman-ı Hakikat. Contrary to what is often said, a claim for territories very often included the Salonica Vilayet too.

=== League of Prizren 1878 ===
The League of Prizren was an Albanian political organization founded on 10 June 1878 in Prizren, in the Kosovo province (vilayet) of the Ottoman Empire. The initial position of the league, based on the religious solidarity of the landlords and the people connected with the Ottoman administration and the religious authorities, was reason for naming the league — The Committee of the Real Muslims (Albanian: Komiteti i Myslimanëve të Vërtetë) On the first meeting of the league was written a decision memorandum (kararname) that did not mention reforms, autonomy, or the union of the Albanian populated vilayets into one vilayet.

Soon after the first meeting of this organization it adopted a new agenda, under the influence of Abdyl Frashëri, that included establishing of the Albanian Vilayet. It was not an appeal for Albanian independence, or even autonomy within Ottoman Empire but, as proposed by Pashko Vasa, simply the unification of all Albanian speaking territory within one vilayet.

Tercümân-i-Şark (English: The Oriental Interpreter) (newspapers which provided detailed coverage about events in Albanian populated area), in which Sami Frashëri was member of the staff, reported about the events in the Albanian populated area (Turkish: Arnavudluk) and about the unionist society (Turkish: cemiyet-i ittihadiye) established by the delegates of League of Prizren.

=== League of Peja 1899 ===
The League of Peja (Albanian: Lidhja e Pejës) was an Albanian political organization established in 1899 in the city of Pejë, Kosovo. It was led by Haxhi Zeka, a former member of the League of Prizren and shared the same platform in quest for an autonomous Albanian vilayet within Ottoman Empire. There were two groups of members. The first group of conservative and more moderate members wanted five vilayets (with Salonica Vilayet included) to be united into the Albanian vilayet, and the second group of the more radical members wanted full administrative autonomy for the four vilayets united in the Albanian vilayet.

=== Albanian Revolt of 1912 ===
The flag of the Autonomous Albanian Vilayet

The Albanian Revolt of 1912 was one of many Albanian revolts in the Ottoman Empire and lasted from January until August 1912. The revolt started in the western part of Kosovo vilayet and was led by Hasan Pristina, Nexhip Draga, Bajram Curri, Riza Bey and others. Hasan Prishtina who was in the Kosovo vilayet during the revolt, and Ismail Qemali who was in Europe gathering weapons and money and attempting to win over European public opinion to the cause of the uprising, maintained communication through the British Consulate in Skopje. Essad Pasha Toptani obliged himself to organize the uprising in Central Albania and Mirdita.

After a series of successes, Albanian rebels managed to capture the city of Skopje, the administrative centre of Kosovo vilayet within the Ottoman rule. The revolt ended when the Ottoman government agreed to accept all demands (ignoring only last one, court martial for Ottoman officers who attempted to suppress revolt) on September 4, 1912.

==== List of accepted demands ====
On August 9, 1912 Albanian rebels presented new list of demands (so called list of Fourteen Points) related to the Albanian vilayet that can be summarized as follows:

- autonomous system of administration and justice
- Albanians to perform military service only in territory of the four vilayets, except in time of war
- employing the officials knowing local language and customs, but not necessarily Albanians,
- establishment of new licees and agricultural schools in the bigger districts
- reorganization and modernization of the religious schools and use of Albanian language in secular schools
- freedom to establish private schools and societies
- the development of trade, agriculture and public works
- general amnesty for all Albanians involved in revolt
- court martial for those Ottoman officers who attempted to suppress revolt

The Ottoman government ended the Albanian revolts by accepting all demands (ignoring only the last one) on September 4, 1912. Hasan Prishtina was planning to start a new revolt in three or four months, because his main goal was not for the autonomy of but independence of the Albanian Vilayet. However the First Balkan War soon broke out and destroyed his plans.

=== First Balkan War ===
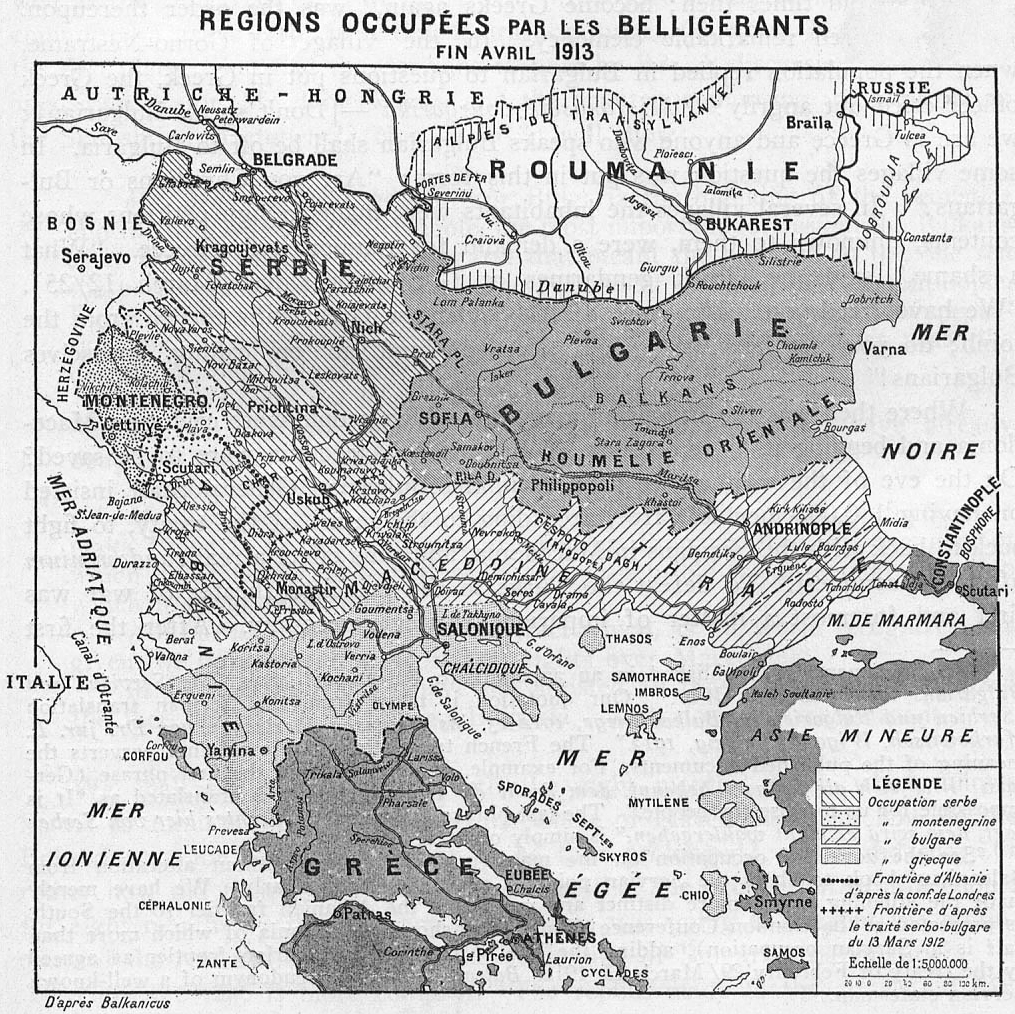
Territory captured in the First Balkan War.

When the First Balkan War broke out, members of the Balkan League captured most of the territory that was promised to be Albanian Vilayet in period October—December 1912. Balkan allies planned the partition of the European territory of the Ottoman Empire among them and in the meantime the conquered territory was agreed to have status of the Condominium. The final fate of the captured territory was to be decided by the Treaty of London and Treaty of Bucharest.

=== Albanian Declaration of Independence ===
When the army of Kingdom of Serbia won Battle of Kumanovo and seized the Skopje and when the Bulgarian army captured Kırk Kilise, at the beginning of the First Balkan War, Ismail Qemali decided to send telegrams to Albanians from the Albanian Vilayet to come to congress to Valona on November 28, 1912. They declared independence and set up a provisional government.

=== Treaties of London and Bucharest ===
The Treaties of London and Bucharest dealt with the territorial adjustments arising out of the conclusion of the Balkan Wars. The frontiers of the newly established Principality of Albania covered only the portion of the territory of Albanian vilayet while its biggest part become the part of the Slavic states and Greece (Balkan League). The Kingdom of Bulgaria lost the conquered parts of the Albanian vilayet during the Second Balkan War.

== Gallery ==
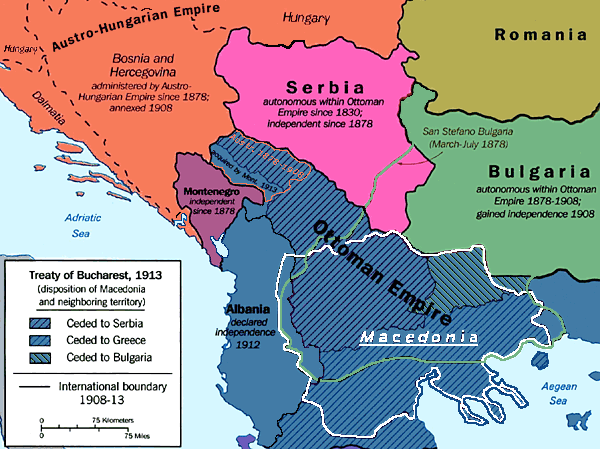
Disposition of territories occupied during Balkan Wars according to Treaty of Bucharest (1913).

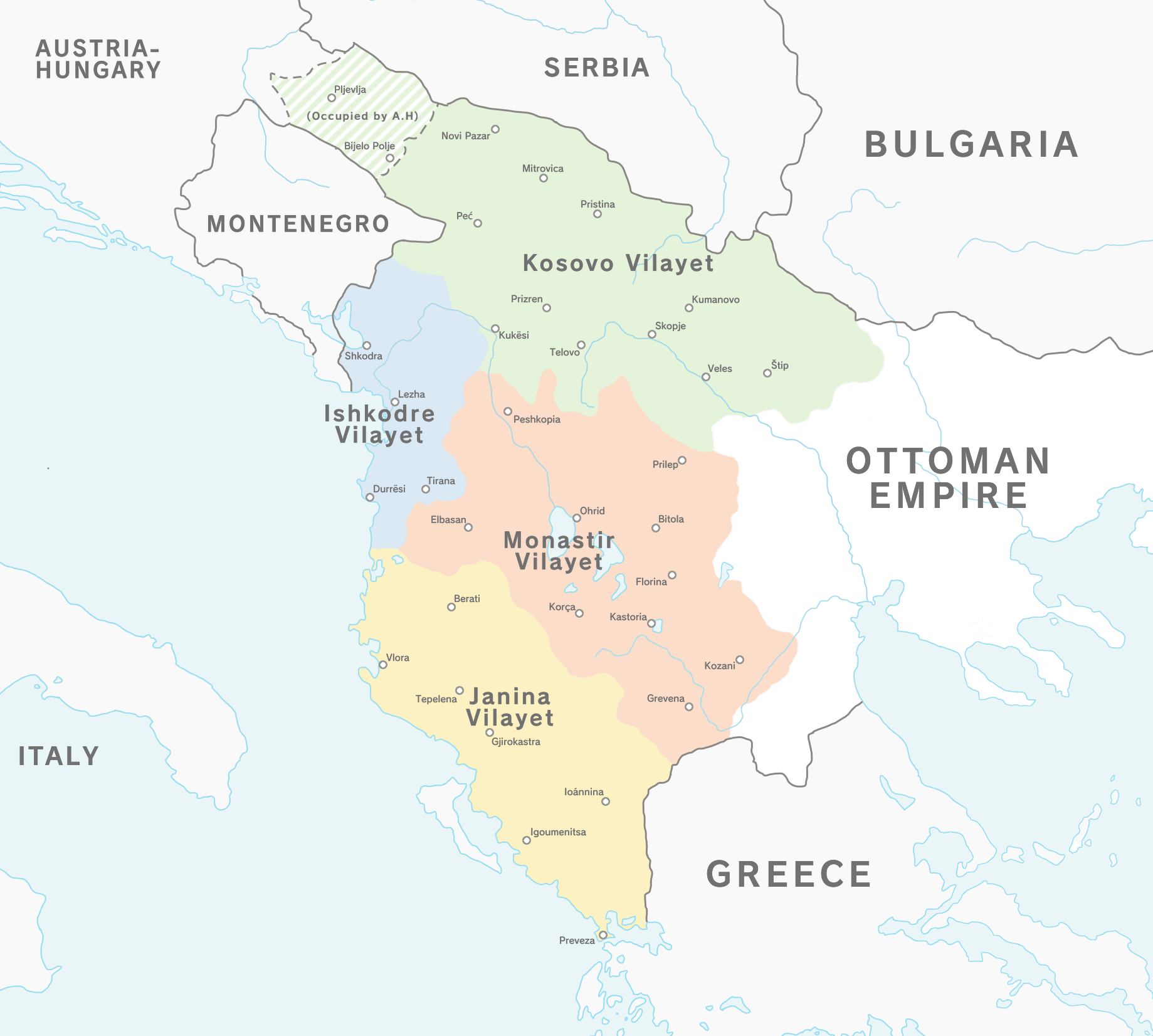
The 4 Ottoman vilayets (Kosovo, Scutari, Monastir and Ioannina), proposed to form the Albanian Vilayet.

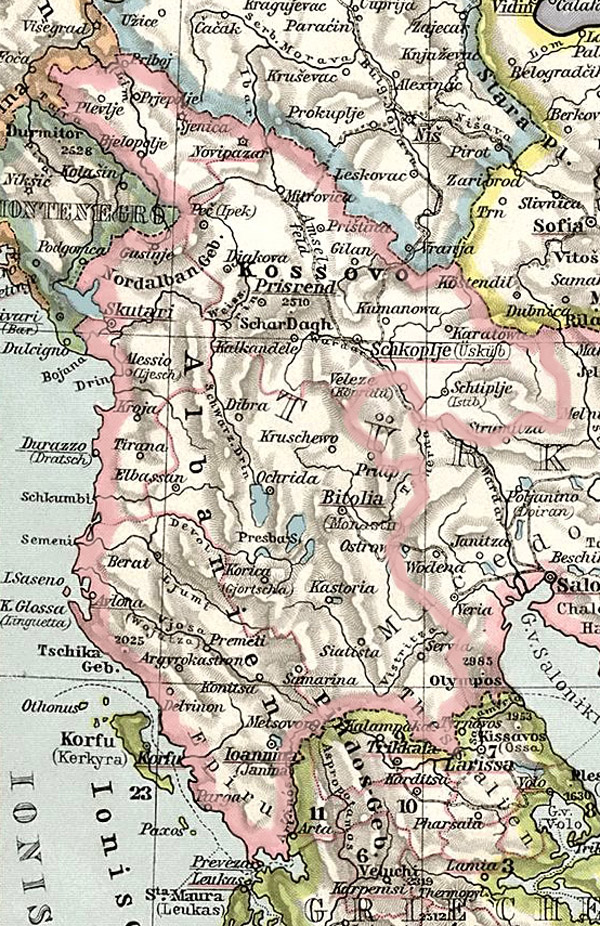
The map of Albanian Vilayet as proposed by the League of Prizren for full autonomy.

== See also ==
- Albanian National Awakening
- Albanian revolt of 1912
- Ismail Qemali
- Hasan Prishtina
- First Balkan War
- Independent Albania
