= League of Prizren =

Albanian political organization (1878–1881)

- Lidhja e Prizrenit
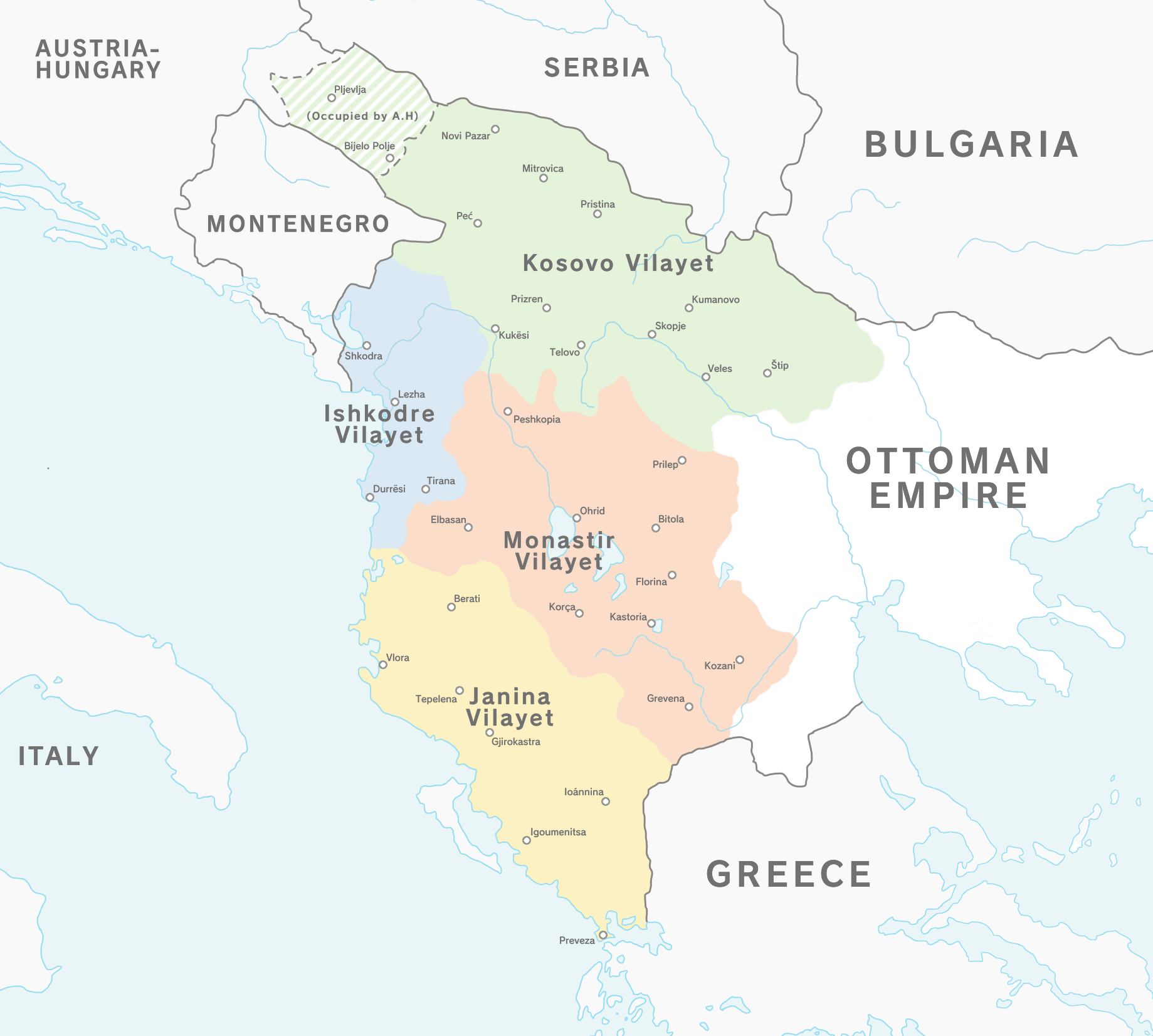
- The four Ottoman vilayets clearly divided (in red: Vilayet of İşkodra, Yannina, Monastir and Kosovo as proposed by the League of Prizren for full autonomy).
- Successor: Second League of Prizren (Claimed successor)
- Formation: June 10, 1878; 148 years ago
- Founder: 47 Albanian beys
- Dissolved: April 1881
- Purpose: Albanian autonomy and later independence
- Headquarters: House of the assembly of the League of Prizren, Prizren, present–day Kosovo
- Location: Prizren, Kosovo Vilayet (modern Kosovo)
- Chairman of the Administrative Albanian League of Prizren: Abdyl Frashëri
- The formal first chairman of the league: Iljaz Pashë Çoku
- Third and last chairman of the league: Ymer Prizreni
- Key people: Abdyl Frashëri; Ali Pasha of Gucia; Pandeli Sotiri; Ymer Prizreni

The League of Prizren (Albanian: Besëlidhja e Prizrenit or Lidhja e Prizrenit), officially the League for the Defense of the Rights of the Albanian Nation (Albanian: Lidhja për mbrojtjen e të drejtave të kombit Shqiptar), was an Albanian political organization that was officially founded on June 10, 1878, in the old town of Prizren in the Kosovo Vilayet of the Ottoman Empire. It was suppressed in April 1881.

The Treaties of San Stefano and Berlin assigned areas inhabited by Albanians to other states. The potential partition and fragmentation of Albanian territories in the Ottoman Empire forced Albanian leaders to organize their own defence and to consider the creation of an autonomous administration, as Serbia and the other Danubian Principalities had enjoyed before their independence.

The league was established at a meeting of 47 Ottoman beys. The initial position of the league was presented in the document known as Kararname. With that document, Albanian leaders emphasized their intention to establish autonomy within the Ottoman Empire by supporting the Porte and "to struggle in arms to defend the wholeness of the territories of Albania". The document said nothing explicitly about reforms, schools, autonomy or the union of the Albanian population within one vilayet, but under the influence of Abdyl Frashëri, that initial position changed radically and resulted in demands for an independent Albanian state and open war against the Ottoman Empire.

== Background ==
The 1877–78 Russo-Turkish War dealt a decisive blow to Ottoman power in the Balkan Peninsula, leaving the empire with only a precarious hold on Albania and the eastern Balkans. The Albanians' fear that the lands they inhabited would be partitioned among Montenegro, Serbia, Bulgaria, and Greece fueled the rise of resistance. The first postwar treaty, the abortive Treaty of San Stefano signed on March 3, 1878, assigned areas claimed by the League of Prizren to Serbia, Montenegro, and Bulgaria. Austria-Hungary and the United Kingdom blocked the arrangement because it awarded Russia a predominant position in the Balkans and thereby upset the European balance of power. A peace conference to settle the dispute was held later in the year in Berlin.

The overall situation influenced Albanians to organize themselves as the Local Councils for National Salvation with the aim to protect the Albanian populated lands. By the end of 1877 the issue of defending territorial integrity had become difficult. On December 13, 1877, the Serbs declared war on Ottoman Empire, as did Montenegro. Both were supported by the Russian Army and spread their attacks across the northern parts of Albania. The Albanians were unable to defend several regions and cities in the northeast and northwest of Albania. Upon occupation of these lands, the Ottoman administrators (of mainly Albanian origin) fled the territories and/or were expelled. During the Russo-Turkish war, the incoming Serb army expelled most of the Muslim Albanian population from the Toplica and Niš regions into Kosovo, triggering the emergence of what became the League of Prizren (1878–1881) as a response to the Great Eastern Crisis.

Influenced by these events the Local Councils for National Salvation merged into a single coordination body. The Albanians, on December 12, 1877, established in Istanbul the Central Committee for the Defense of Rights of the Albanian Nation.

The Treaty of San Stefano triggered profound anxiety among the Albanians and Bosniaks, and it spurred their leaders to organize a defense of the lands they inhabited. In the spring of 1877, influential Albanians in Constantinople – including Abdyl Frashëri, the Albanian national movement's leading figure during its early years – organized a committee to direct the Albanians' resistance. In May the group called for a general meeting of representatives from all the areas where Albanian communities existed during that time. The committee's members were Ali Ibra, Zija Prishtina, Sami Frashëri, Jani Vreto, Vaso Pasha, Baca Kurti Gjokaj and Abdyl Frashëri.

== Meeting in Prizren ==
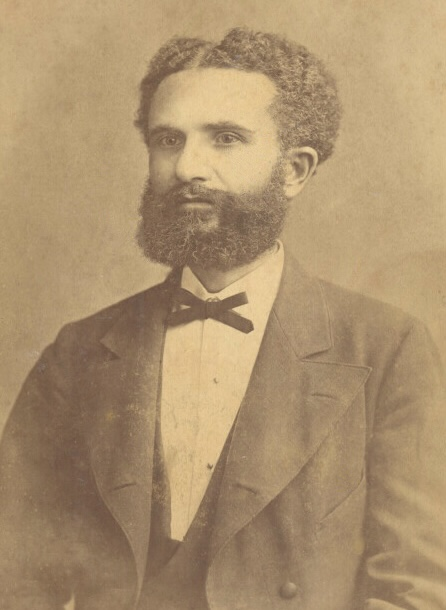
Abdyl Frashëri, leading figure of the League of Prizren movement

We wholeheartedly wish to live in peace with all our neighbours, Serbia, Montenegro, Greece and Bulgaria... We do not want and do not ask anything of them, but we are all determined to protect that which is ours.

— Excerpt from the League of Prizren's platform, 1878,

The League of Prizren was created by a group of Albanian intellectuals to resist partition among neighboring Balkan states and to assert an Albanian national consciousness by uniting Albanians into a unitary linguistic and cultural nation. During the meeting in Prizren a kararname was signed by 47 beys on June 18, 1878. The document represented an initial position, mainly supported by landlords and individuals related to the Ottoman administration. In Article 1 of this document, these Albanian leaders restated their intention to preserve and maintain the territorial integrity of the Ottoman Empire in the Balkans by supporting the Porte and "to struggle in arms to defend the wholeness of the territories of Albania". Article 6 of the same document restated the hostility of the Albanians to the independence of both Bulgaria and Serbia. "We should not allow foreign armies to tread on our land. We should not recognize Bulgaria's name. If Serbia does not leave peacefully the illegally occupied countries, we should send bashibazouks (akindjias) and strive until the end to liberate these regions, including Montenegro."

On the first meeting of the league the decision memorandum (kararname) said nothing explicitly about reforms, schools, autonomy or the union of the Albanian population within one vilayet. It was at first not an appeal for Albanian independence, or even autonomy within Ottoman Empire but, as proposed by Pashko Vasa, simply the unification of all claimed territory within one vilayet. The participants wanted to return to the status quo before the start of Russo-Turkish War of 1877–1878. The main aim was to defend from immediate dangers. Soon that position changed radically and resulted in demands of autonomy and open war against the Ottoman Empire as formulated by Abdyl Frashëri.

== Berlin Congress ==
Illustration of the flag of the Bajrak of Kashnjeti used at the event is the only surviving flag of that period.

Just as we are not and do not want to be Turks, so we shall oppose with all our might anyone who would like to turn us into Slavs or Austrians or Greeks, we want to be Albanians.

— Excerpt from the League of Prizren memorandum to the British delegation at the Berlin Congress, 1878,

In July 1878, the 60 member board of the League of Prizren, led by Abdyl Bey Frashëri, sent a letter to the Great Powers at the Congress of Berlin, asking for the settling of Albanian issues resulting from the Turkish War. The memorandum was ignored by the congress, which recognized the competing claims of Serbia and Bulgaria to territories surrendered by the Ottoman Empire over those of the Albanians. The League of Prizren feared that the Albanians would not win in their claims to Epirus over Greece, and organized an armed resistance in Gusinje, Shkodra, Prizren, and Yanina. The San Stefano treaty was later superseded by the Treaty of Berlin at the insistence of Austria-Hungary and Britain. This latter treaty, however, recognized the rival claims of other nations in the region over those of the Albanians.

The Congress of Berlin ignored the memorandum from the league with German chancellor Otto von Bismarck even proclaiming that an Albanian nation did not exist and that Albania was "just a geographic notion". Bismarck showed his disdain for excessive involvement in Balkan affairs, saying "The whole Balkan is not worth the healthy bones of a single Pomeranian grenadier." The congress ceded to Montenegro the cities of Bar and Podgorica and areas around the mountain towns of Gusinje and Plav, which Albanian leaders considered Albanian territory. Serbia also gained some territory with an Albanian population. The latter, the vast majority of whom were loyal to the empire, vehemently opposed the territorial losses.

== Formation ==
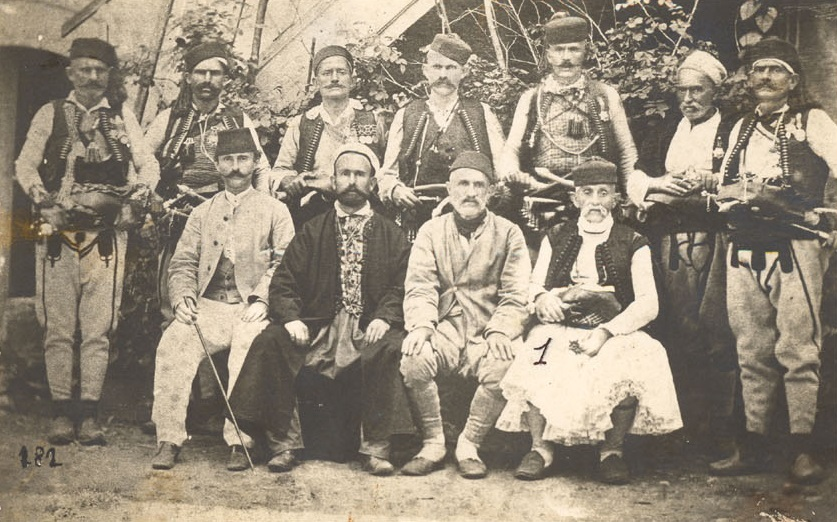
Group photo of some of the League of Prizren delegates

On June 10, 1878, about eighty delegates, mostly Muslim religious leaders, clan chiefs, and other influential people from the Ottoman vilayets of Kosovo, Monastir and Yanina, met in the city of Prizren, Kosovo (then Ottoman Empire). Around 300 Muslims participated on the assembly, including delegates from Bosnia and the mutasarrif (administrator of sanjak) of Prizren as representative of the central authorities, and no delegates from Scutari Vilayet. The delegates set up a standing organization, the League of Prizren, under the direction of a central committee that had the power to impose taxes and raise an army. The league of Prizren consisted of two branches: the Prizren and the southern branch. The Prizren branch was led by Iljas Dibra and it had representatives from the areas of Kırçova (Kicevo), Kalkandelen (Tetovo), Priştine (Prishtina), Mitroviça (Mitrovica), Vıçıtırın (Vushtrri), Üsküp (Skopje), Gilan (Gjilan), Manastır (Bitola), Debre (Debar) and Gostivar. The southern branch, led by Abdyl Frashëri consisted of sixteen representatives from the areas of Kolonjë, Korçë, Arta, Berat, Parga, Gjirokastër, Përmet, Paramythia, Filiates, Margariti, Vlorë, Tepelenë and Delvinë. In these regions the movement was primarily Muslim, due to the fact that most of the Orthodox population was under Greek influence. On the other hand, in the northern regions both Muslim and Catholic populations supported the objectives of the League of Prizren.

At first the Ottoman authorities supported the League of Prizren, but the Sublime Porte pressed the delegates to declare themselves to be first and foremost Ottomans rather than Albanians. Some delegates, led by Sheikh Mustafa Ruhi Efendi of Kalkandelen, supported this position and advocated emphasizing Muslim solidarity and the defense of Muslim lands, including present-day Bosnia and Herzegovina. This initial position of the league, based on the religious solidarity of the landlords and the people connected with the Ottoman administration and the religious authorities, was the reason for naming the league The Committee of the Real Muslims (Albanian: Komiteti i Myslimanëve të Vërtetë). Other representatives, under Frashëri's leadership, focused on working toward Albanian autonomy and establishing and Albanian state by creating a sense of Albanian identity that would cut across religious and tribal lines. The Ottoman state briefly supported the league's claims viewing Albanian nationalism as possibly preventing further territorial losses to newly independent Balkan states.

== Military resistance ==
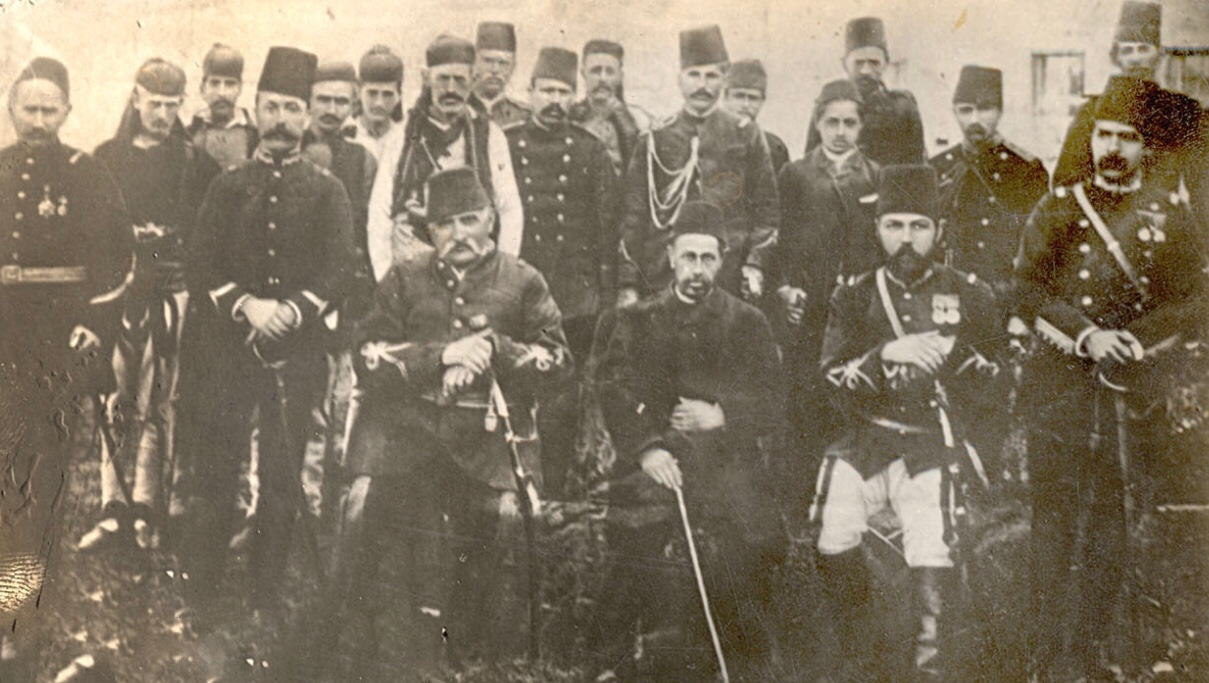
Ali Pasha of Gusinje (seated, left) with Haxhi Zeka (seated, middle) and some other members of the Prizren League

Failing to win their claims on a diplomatic level, Albanians embarked on the route of military conflict with their Balkan neighbors.

The Prizren League had 30,000 armed members under its control, who launched a revolution against the Ottoman Empire after the debacle at the Congress of Berlin and the official dissolution of the League ordered by the Ottomans who feared the League would seek total independence from the empire. The first military operation of the league was the attack against Mehmed Ali Pasha, the Ottoman marshal who would oversee the transfer of Plav-Gucia area to Montenegro. On December 4, 1879, members of the league participated in the Battle of Novšiće and defeated Montenegrin forces who tried to take control over Plav and Gusinje. After the breakout of open war the League took over control from the Ottomans in the Kosovo towns of Vushtrri, Peja, Mitrovica, Prizren and Gjakova. In 1880, northeastern Albanian delegates proposed creating an autonomous Albanian province, with Monastir or Ohrid as its capital, locally appointed officials, and partial revenue allocation to the Ottoman central government. This proposal, presented by the Prizren League to the sultan, was echoed in an October 1880 assembly in Dibra, which called for Albania's unification. Prominent figures, including Xhemal Bey, Abdul Bey Frashëri, and Dervish Mustafa Efendi, worked to rally support and foster unity across northern and southern Albania.

In January 1881, Sulejman Vokshi of Gjakova led League troops in the capture of Skopje and Prishtina. In February, the League's forces captured Dibra and forced the Ottoman administration to withdraw. Guided by the autonomous movement, the League rejected Ottoman authority and sought complete secession from the Porte.

In August 1878, the Congress of Berlin ordered a commission to trace a border between the Ottoman Empire and Montenegro. The congress also directed Greece and the Ottoman Empire to negotiate a solution to their border dispute. The Albanians' successful resistance to the treaty forced the Great Powers to return Gusinje and Plav to the Ottoman Empire and grant Montenegro the mostly Albanian-populated coastal town of Ulcinj. There the Albanians refused to surrender. Finally, the Great Powers blockaded Ulcinj by sea and pressured the Ottoman authorities to bring the Albanians under control. Albanian diplomatic and military efforts were successful in wresting control of Epirus, however some lands were still ceded to Greece by 1881. The Great Powers decided in 1881 to cede Greece Thessaly and the district of Arta.

In areas like Kastoria, Prilep, Bitola and Veles where an Albanian population was present, the local Bulgarian movement of the day was defeated when armed Bulgarian groups were repelled by the League of Prizren who opposed Bulgarian geopolitical aims.

The Ottoman Empire sought to suppress the League and they dispatched an army led by Ottoman commander Dervish Pasha, that by April 1881 had captured Prizren and crushed the resistance at the Battle of Ulcinj. The leaders of the league and their families were either killed or arrested and deported.

== End of the league ==
Faced with growing international pressure to "pacify" the refractory Albanians, the sultan dispatched a large army under Dervish Turgut Pasha to suppress the League of Prizren and deliver Ulcinj to Montenegro. This culminated in conflict between the League and the innumerable forces of the Ottomans, particularly the Battle of Slivova, in which a small, poorly-armed force of Albanian resistance fighters were defeated by an Ottoman expeditionary force of 20 battalions, albeit not without great cost for the Ottomans. Albanians who were loyal to the empire supported the Sublime Porte's military intervention. In April 1881, Dervish Pasha's 10,000 men captured Prizren and later crushed the resistance at Ulcinj. The League of Prizren's leaders and their families were arrested and deported. Frashëri, who originally received a death sentence, was imprisoned until 1885 and exiled until his death seven years later.

== Legacy ==
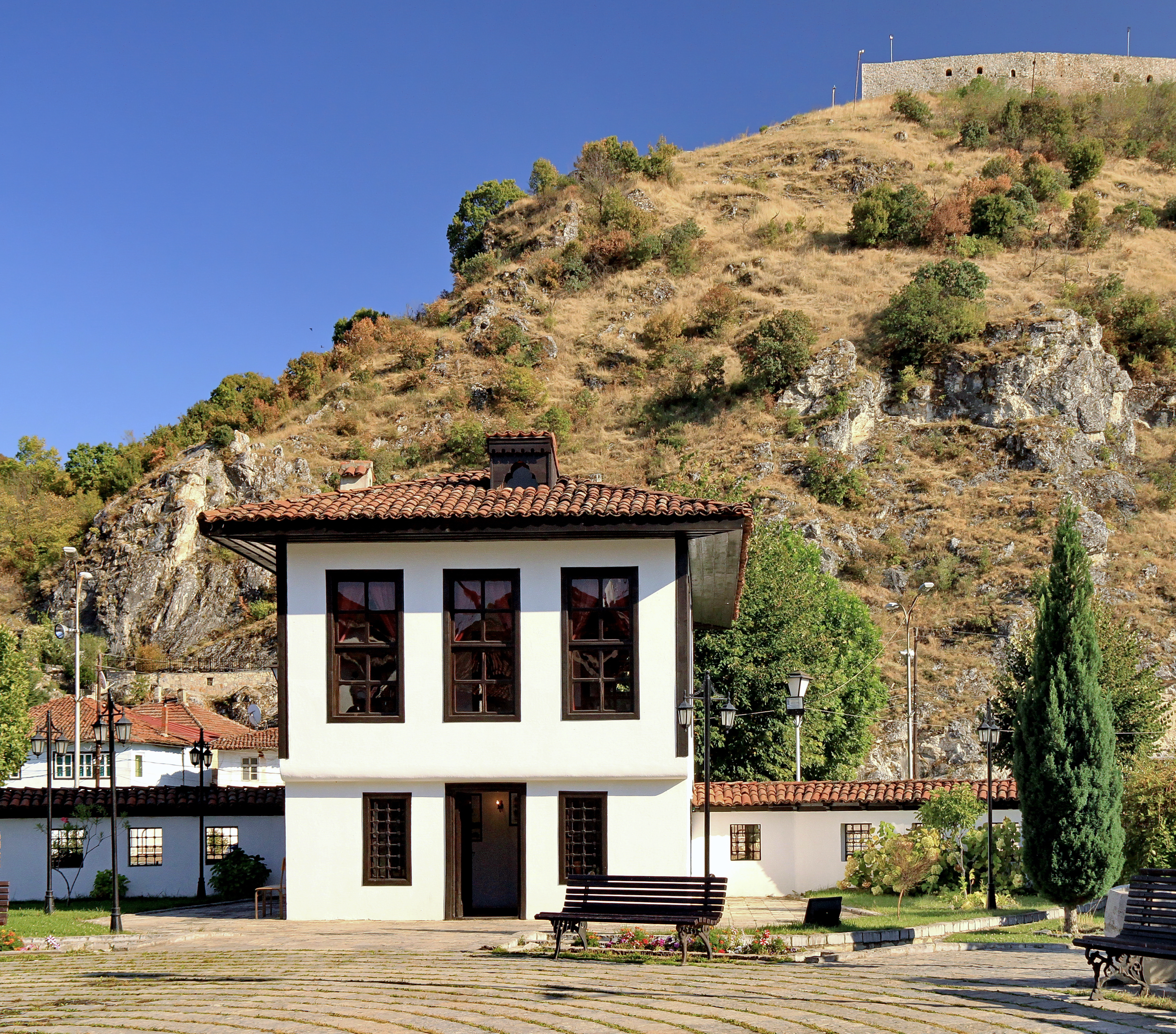
The Monumental Complex of the Albanian League of Prizren from inside the courtyard, and up in the background is the Prizren Fortress

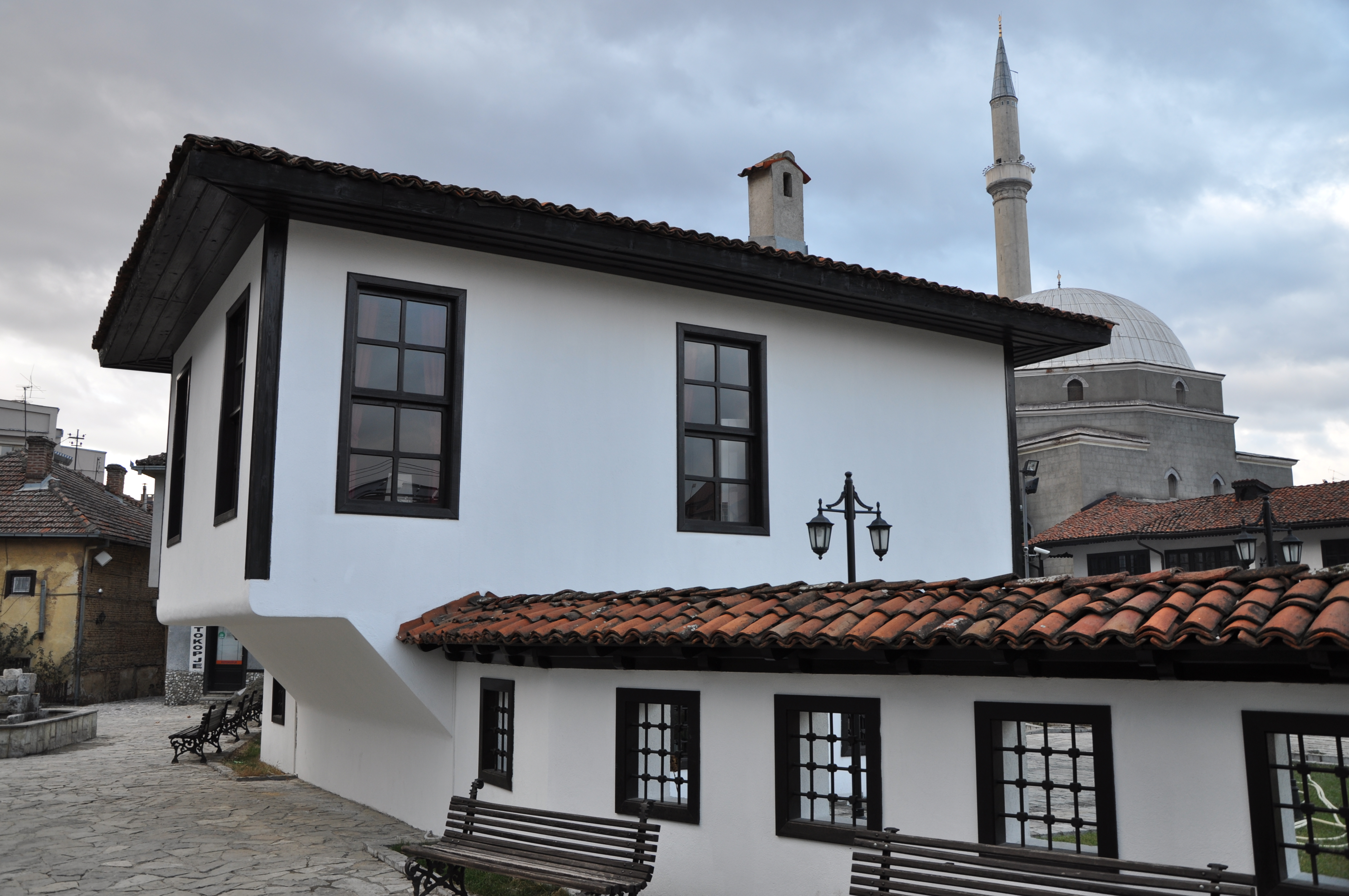
View from the street

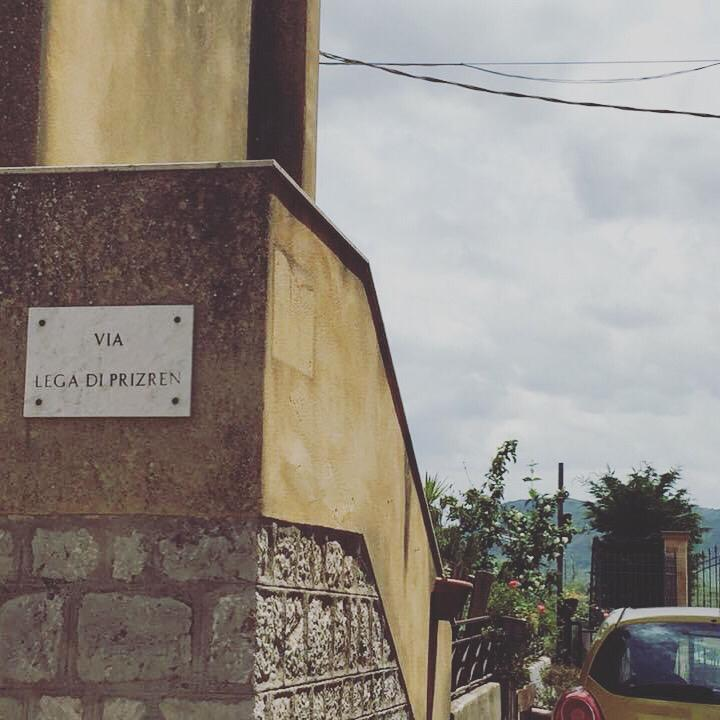
League of Prizren Street in Santa Cristina Gela in honor of the Arbëresh contribution to Albanian independence

Formidable barriers frustrated Albanian leaders' efforts to instill in their people an Albanian rather than an Ottoman identity. Divided into four vilayets, Albanians had no common geographical or political nerve center. The Albanians' religious differences forced nationalist leaders to give the national movement a purely secular character that alienated religious leaders. The most significant factor uniting the Albanians, their spoken language, lacked a standard literary form and even a standard alphabet. Each of the three available choices, the Latin, Cyrillic, and Arabic scripts, implied different political and religious orientations opposed by one or another element of the population. In 1878 there were no Albanian-language schools in the most developed of the areas claimed by the League, Gjirokastër, Berat, and Vlorë – where schools conducted classes either in Turkish or in Greek.

The League of Prizren was among the most obvious Albanian reactions to the dramatic withdrawal of the Albanians' imperial patrons, the Ottoman Empire, after almost four centuries of dominance in the Balkans. The aftermath of the Russo-Turkish war of 1878 produced the Treaty of San Stefano, which recognised the independence and/or territorial claims of Bulgaria, Montenegro and Serbia. After the Russo-Turkish war of 1877–1878. Albanian leaders from Peja, Gjakova, Gusinje, Luma, and from Debar and Tetovo met in Vardar Macedonia to discuss the development of what would only later be regarded as a national platform. The group of proto-nationalists received all manner of material and financial support from the Ottoman Empire, which was faced with the realities of having to withdraw yet again from its occupied territories in the Balkans. The League of Prizren received funding, the highest quality weaponry, and diplomatic support from the Porte, which established the Central Committee for Defending Albanian Rights in Constantinople in 1877.

== Aftermath ==
The Ottoman Empire continued to crumble after the Congress of Berlin and Sultan Abdül Hamid II resorted to repression to maintain order. The authorities strove without success to control the political situation in the empire's Albanian-populated lands, arresting suspected nationalist activists. When the sultan refused Albanian demands for unification of the four Albanian-populated vilayets, Albanian leaders reorganized the League of Prizren and incited uprisings that brought the region, especially Kosovo, to near anarchy. During the twenty five years that followed the abolition of the league the various uprisings were local in character and occurred mostly in the northern regions and especially in the Vilayet of Kosovo. The imperial authorities disbanded a successor organisation, the League of Peja (Besa-Besë) founded in 1897, executed its president Haxhi Zeka in 1902, and banned Albanian-language books and correspondence. In Macedonia, where Bulgarian-, Greek-, and Serbian-backed guerrillas were fighting Ottoman authorities and one another for control, Muslim Albanians suffered attacks, and Albanian guerrilla groups retaliated. In 1905 Albanian leaders meeting in Monastir (Bitola) established the Secret Committee for the Liberation of Albania.

While it was active, the league managed to bring Albanian national interests before the Great Powers and paved the way for the League of Peja, which had greater foreign support from both Italy and the Austria-Hungarian Empire.

Despite its ultimate failure, the League of Prizren accomplished a great deal. Both Montenegro and Greece received less Albanian-claimed territory than they would have otherwise received without the organized protest. This was the first step toward a national organization.

== See also ==
- Albanian Vilayet
- Albanian Committee of Janina
- Albanian nationalism and independence
- Central Committee for Defending Albanian Rights
- Convention of Dibra
- Expulsion of the Albanians, 1877–1878
- League of Peja
- Rilindja Kombëtare
- Second League of Prizren
- Third League of Prizren
- Partition of Albania
- Treaty of London (1913)
