= Sami Frashëri =

Albanian writer, philosopher, playwright and activist (1850–1904)

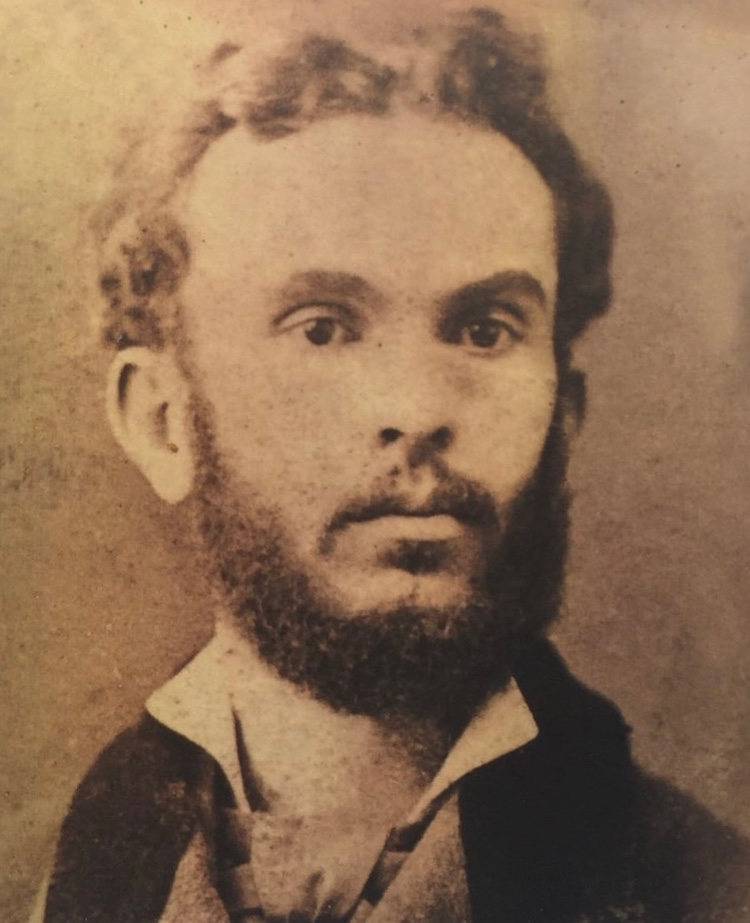
- Frashëri, 1880s
- Born: June 1, 1850; Frashër, Përmet, Albania (then Ottoman Empire)
- Died: June 18, 1904 (aged 54); Erenköy, Kadıköy, Istanbul, Ottoman Empire (modern Turkey)
- Organization(s): Central Committee for Defending Albanian Rights, Society for the Printing of Albanian Writings
- Movement: National Renaissance of Albania
- Children: Ali Sami Yen
- Parent(s): Halit Bey (1797–1859) - Father and Emine Hanım (1814–1861) - Mother
- Relatives: Abdyl Frashëri (Brother); Naim Frashëri (Brother); Mid’hat Frashëri (Nephew); Mehdi Frashëri (Nephew); Iljaz bej Mirahori (maternal ancestor); Ajaz Bey and Hamza Bey (paternal ancestors); Ajaz Frashëri (Grandfather) and 5 other siblings

Sami bey Frashëri (Turkish: Şemseddin Sami Bey; June 1, 1850 – June 18, 1904) or Şemseddin Sâmi was an Albanian writer, lexicographer, philosopher, playwright and a prominent figure of the Albanian National Awakening, together with his two brothers Abdyl and Naim. He also supported Turkish nationalism against its Ottoman counterpart, along with secularism (anti-clericalism or laicism) against theocracy.

Frashëri was one of the sons of an impoverished bey from Frashër (Fraşer during Ottoman rule) in the District of Përmet. He gained a place in Ottoman literature as a talented author under the name of Şemseddin Sami Efendi and contributed to the Ottoman Turkish language reforms.

Frashëri's message, however, as declared in his book "Albania - What it was, what it is, and what will become of it", published in 1899, became the manifesto of the Albanian National Awakening. He discussed the prospects for a united, free and independent republic of Albania. In this way, beginning with a demand for autonomy and struggle for their own alphabet and education, Frashëri helped the Albanian National Movement develop its claim for independence. His lifetime goal, as that of many other members of the Albanian renaissance, was the development and improvement of Albania's culture and eventual establishment of an independent country.

== Life ==
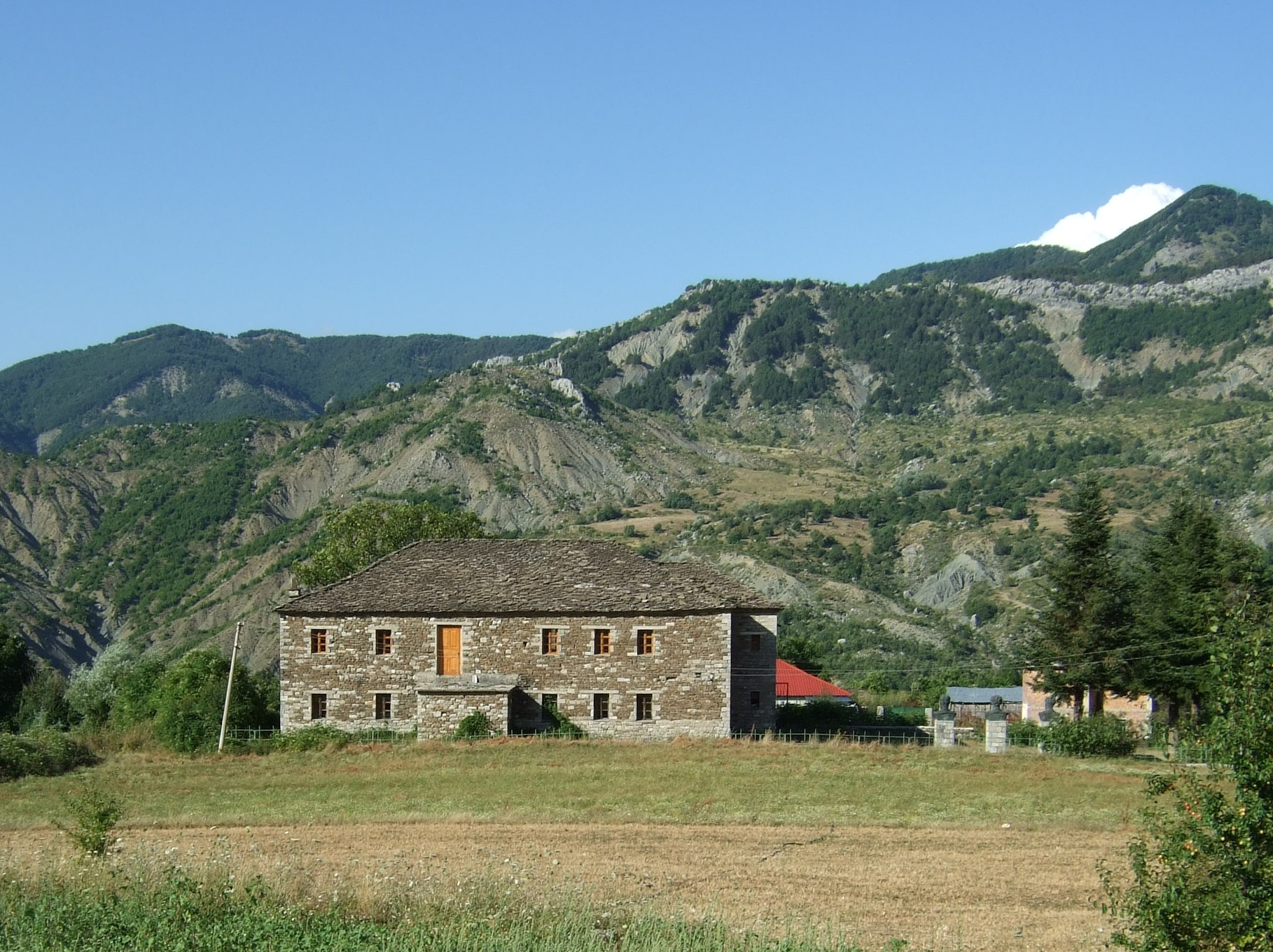
Museum house of the Frashëri Brothers in Frashër, Përmet, Albania

Sami Frashëri was born in 1850 in the village of Frashër in the Ioannina Eyalet, Ottoman Empire (modern Albania) to a distinguished Muslim Albanian family of Bektashi religious affiliations. Sami, alongside his brothers Naim Frashëri, Abdyl Frashëri and 5 other siblings were the children of Halit Bey (1797–1859) and their paternal family traditions held that they were descendants of timar holders that hailed from the Berat region before coming to live in Frashër. Halit belonged to the Dakollari branch of the Frashëri family. They were descendants of Ajaz Bey from Gramsh who in 1650–60 was given the command of Frashër. Ajaz Bey's grandfather, Hamza Bey had lost his lands in Tomorrica in 1570 when he rebelled and was exiled but the family's fortunes changed with the rise of Köprülü Mehmed Pasha who intervened on their behalf and they were pardoned. Their mother Emine Hanım (1814–1861) was descended from Imrahor Ilyas Bey, a distinguished 15th-century Ottoman Albanian commander from the Korçë area (Panarit).

Sami began his studies at the Bektashi tekke in Frashër. Halit Bey and Emine died in 1859 and 1861 respectively. His older brother Abdul became head of the household and moved the whole family to Yanina. There Sami attended the Greek language Zosimea high school. During that time he came in touch with western philosophy and studied Latin, ancient and modern Greek, French and Italian. He also attended a local Muslim school and learned through lessons from teachers Turkish, Arabic, and Persian. Frashëri was a bright student and finished an eight-year schooling program by graduating at the end of seven years. His reflections of the Zosimea later in life was that it was "the perfect high school". Having received a broad education in a diverse socio-cultural and religious environment at the Zosimea and through private tutors, he gained the linguistic tools to emotionally and intellectually travel between cultures during his lifetime.

In 1872 Sami and his brother Naim migrated to Istanbul and both got a job working for the Ottoman bureaucracy and as he admired French culture became involved in translating French language novels such as Les Misérables into Ottoman Turkish, later writing some short stories, plays and novels of his own. He was briefly posted in Tripoli, Libya and in 1874 returned to Istanbul becoming a writer for a newspaper. Later in 1877 he went on another short assignment being posted briefly at Rhodes. Returning to Istanbul he remained in the capital for the remainder of his life. Frashëri emerged as an accomplished Ottoman-Albanian intellectual with a reputation of having an inquisitive and sharp intellect. He assisted in founding and serving as chief editor for several journals and newspapers. In Ottoman Turkish he wrote more than a dozen books like Insan (Human Being), Medeniyet-i Islamiye (Islamic Civilisation) and Kadınlar (Women). He compiled a French-Turkish (1882) and Turkish-French (1884) dictionary, an Arabic language dictionary (1898) and a two volume Ottoman Turkish dictionary (1899-1901) along with a six volume encyclopedia Kâmûsü'l-A'lâm (1899-1899). Additionally Frashëri authored other publications in the Albanian language that included a pamphlet on the alphabet question, a reader, a grammar and a political treatise on the Albanian question titled Albania: What she has been, What she is, What she shall be.

=== Involvement in the Albanian national movement ===
==== The Besa yahut Ahde Vefa play ====
In Istanbul 1874 Frashëri wrote a play named Besâ yâhut Âhde Vefâ (Pledge of Honor or Loyalty to an Oath) in the Albanian language with themes based on an Albanian ethnicity, a bond to an ethnic based territory, ethno-cultural diversity as underlying Ottoman unity, honor, loyalty and self-sacrifice. The play revolved around a betrothed girl kidnapped by a jealous villager that kills her father and whose mother vows revenge co-opting the culprit's father who gives his besa (pledge of honor) to help not knowing its his son, later killing him and himself ending with family reconciliation. Frashëri's reasons for the play were to inform people about the morals, values, customs and traditions of Albanians whom he considered an important part of the empire and to create more local Ottoman theatre which he felt was dominated by foreign influences. The play was intended to present Albanians in a positive light to Ottoman and Albanian audiences that involved mainly Armenians directing and acting in roles with smaller numbers of Turks during its stage run. His play and its discussion of besa signified to more astute audiences the political implications of the concept and possible subversive connotations in future usage while it assisted Albanians in rallying militarily and politically around a national program.

By 1901 his play was translated into Albanian by close friend Abdul Ypi and published in Sofia by Kristo Luarasi while it was part of the curriculum of the Albanian school in Korçë until its closure in 1902. The themes of the play highlighting a besa for the self-sacrifice of the homeland carried a subversive message for Albanians to aim at unifying the nation and defending the homeland, something Ottoman authorities also saw as fostering nationalist sentiments. The Ottoman government placed the Albanian language version of the play on a list of books it deemed that "incite national sentiments of the Albanians" and during the Young Turk Revolution of 1908 there were reports of Albanian guerillas acting out scenes around campfires. Frashëri's play would not appear in theatres until the aftermath of the 1908 Young Turk Revolution when performances continued for a full three years and during 1911-1912.

==== League of Prizren period ====
The Albanian Unionist Committee... has decided to erect a barrier against the penetration of Slavism and Greekism into Albania.

— Sami Frashëri, 1878

During the Great Eastern Crisis, the Central Committee for Defending Albanian Rights was founded in 1877 and headed by elder brother Abdyl with Sami, Hasan Tahsini, Pashko Vasa and Jani Vreto being members. The Committee aimed at the territorial unity and integrity of Albanian inhabited land within the Ottoman Empire with its members sending protests and visiting European embassies while urging Albanians in the Balkans to resist partition. Early in 1879, this committee formed a commission for the Albanian alphabet. The Committee appointed Sami along with Tahsini, Vasa and Vreto to create an Albanian alphabet. During discussions about the Albanian alphabet Frashëri and Vreto wanted the inclusion of a Greek alphabet character on the premise that Albanians and Greeks have the same ancestors, the Pelasgians. Frashëri created a new Albanian alphabet based on the Latin script and a one letter, one sound principle that contained certain Greek letters and others invented by him for sounds that a Latin alphabet was unable to convey. By 19 March 1879 the Society for Albanian Writings adopted Frashëri's 36 letter Istanbul alphabet consisting mostly of Latin characters that resulted in the publication of Albanian books and toward the late nineteenth century his alphabet had spread among Albanians. On 20 June 1878 Sami was one of ten signatories to a memorandum addressed to Berlin Congress hosts chancellor Bismarck and Count Andrassy calling for reforms and Albanians to remain in the Ottoman state with their rights, desires, interests and traditions being respected.

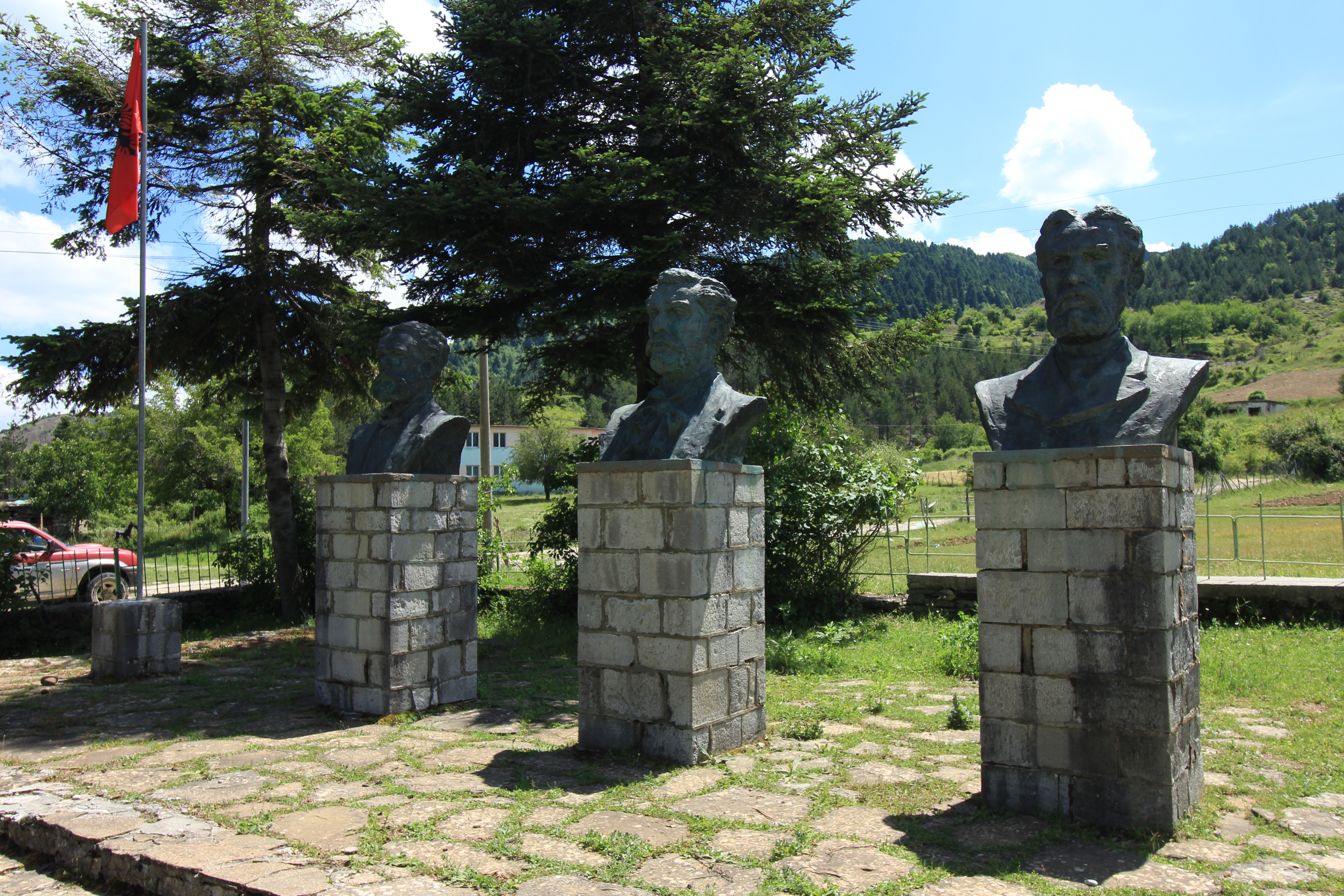
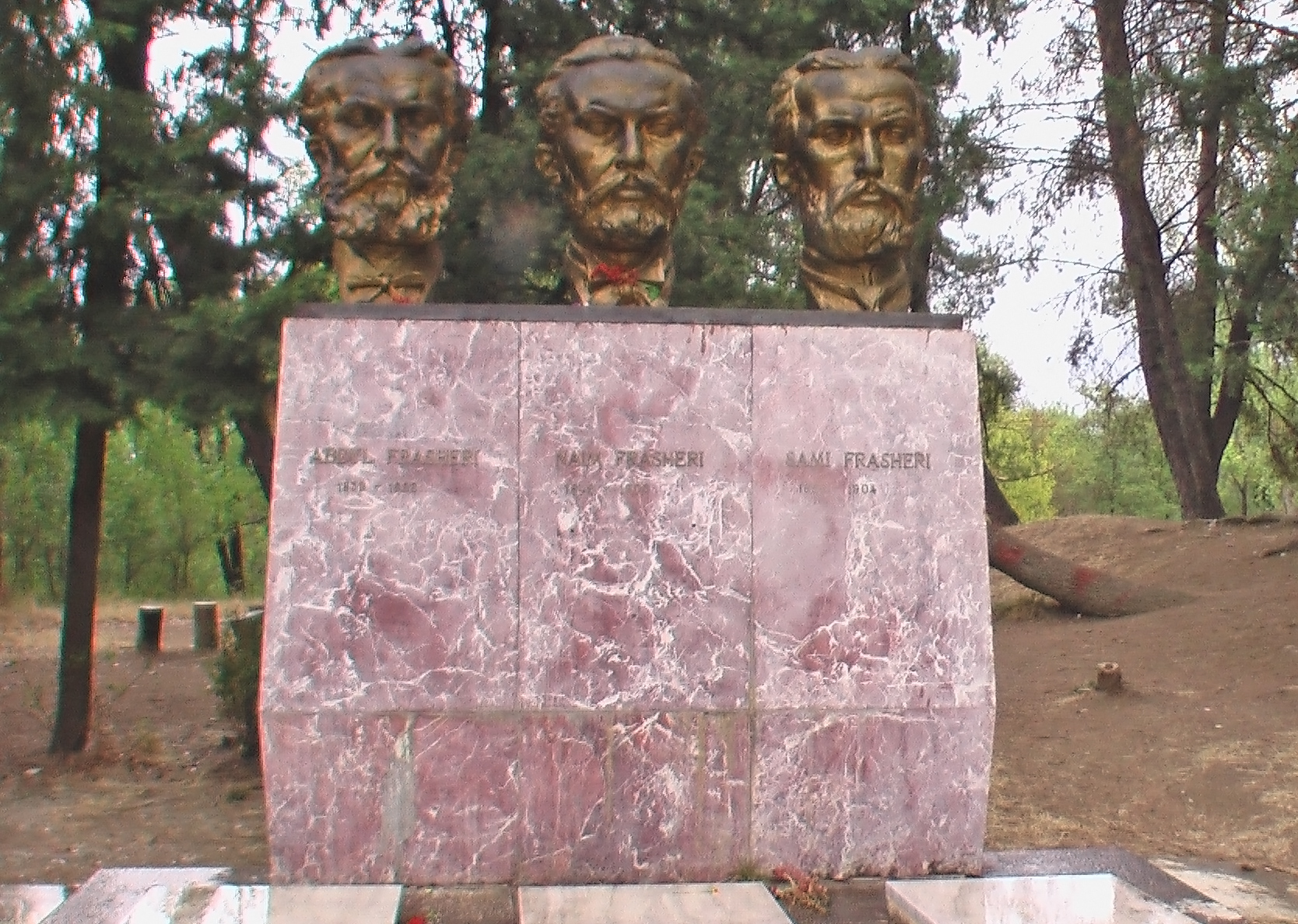
Monument to Frashëri brothers in Frashër with Sami third on the right (left); Monument to Frashëri brothers in Tiranë with Sami third on the right (right)

Amidst this time Frashëri worked for the Ottoman newspaper Tercüman-ı Hakikat and he reported coverage on the geopolitical situation and events in Albania. In an article published on 24 December 1878 about the Albanian question, he expressed that Albania was his special vatan (homeland) and he felt connected to the wider Ottoman motherland stressing that Albanians were loyal to the empire and ready to defend it. He referred to two threats facing Albanians, one military due to irredentist claims of neighbouring powers on Albanian inhabited land and the other was cultural where Slavs and Greeks had established schools that used their languages in Albanian areas. The solution for him was the unification of Albania into one vilayet (province) that could establish an effective resistance force. Frashëri continued to write a series of articles expanding his views by maintaining that Albanians wished to read and write in their language and those abilities he thought would allow Albanians protection from the influences of Hellenism and Slavism.

By 2 January 1879 he developed his thoughts further and stressed that the Ottoman constitution of 1876 guaranteed this right to all peoples of the empire to read and write in ones native language. Frashëri viewed the plight of his fellow Albanians as based upon poverty and ignorance that disadvantaged them when it came to dealing with Hellenism and Slavism. He considered those factors as placing Albanians at risk of being severed from the empire for the benefits of foreign powers and peoples with Frashëri stating that both Christian and Muslim Albanians were thinking alike on these issues.

Frashëri also founded and headed in Istanbul the Society for the Publication of Albanian Writings in October 1879, where Albanian scholastic books and texts were compiled by him and his brother Naim. He expressed that the Society had difficulties in its work due to a lack of "liberty" in the empire and for Frashëri the aims of the organisation went further than publishing books but to revive the Albanian language and unify its dialects. In a correspondence of 1881 with Girolamo De Rada regarding the Albanian question Frashëri expressed sentiments supporting Albanian unity that transcended Muslim and Christian divisions with religion being separate from the state. By 1884 he had developed a reputation for championing the Albanian cause. The Society for Albanian Writings was forced to close by the Ottoman Government in 1885. In 1885, Frashëri managed to get permission from the Ottoman sultan for the opening of an Albanian boys school in Korçë. On 7 March 1887 it opened in Korçë with some two hundred enrolled students of Muslim and Christian faiths and due to a lack of education material Sami, his brother Naim and several other Albanians wrote textbooks in Albanian for the school. In 1896 he made an assessment of education in the Vilayet of Monastir claiming that Greeks, Bulgarians and Aromanians had more progressive schools and advanced education than Muslim Albanians.

=== Between Ottomanism, Albanianism and Turkism ===
==== The Kâmûsü'l-A'lâm encyclopedia ====
Between 1889 and 1899 Frashëri wrote a six-volume encyclopedia titled Kâmûsü'l-A'lâm (Dictionary of Proper Names) in Ottoman Turkish. In this scientific work of 4,380 pages, he sought to provide information about famous individuals, geography, countries, demography, history, and cultures, especially those of the Islamic and Ottoman worlds, which he felt were inadequately covered in Western publications. The encyclopedia had a focus on Turks, Arabs and in particular the Ottomans, with Frashëri including detailed information for his readers on topics about Albania and Albanians.

For example, the entry titled Arnavud (Albanian) was six pages and a total of eleven columns. The detailed article presented Albanians as an ancient Balkan people, older than Greeks and Latins that preserved in the mountains their customs such as the besa, traditions, language and an identity. The assertion aimed to present Albanians as legitimate members of the community of nations during an era of nationalism. Frashëri included information on the Venetian period, the Ottoman conquest, conversion to Islam, and the attainment of Ottoman privileges. He highlighted Albanians' sacrifices and service to the state as soldiers, bureaucrats, in commerce and industry. Skanderbeg, a fifteenth-century Albanian warrior, and his revolt against the Ottomans were described in a positive light, as were the national and intellectual achievements of the Albanian diaspora in southern Italy. Despite the regional differences of Ghegs and Tosks, Frashëri emphasized the unity of Albanians as speaking the same language with small dialectal differences. He stressed the importance of developing Albanian language education and literature as a way of resisting encroachment from others through for example Hellenisation and as such urged authorities to allow Albanian national development. As with other entries on cities, towns, administrative units and others on Albanian topics Frashëri overall aimed in his encyclopedia to educate the general public about Albanians, to raise Albanian self-awareness and outline the geographical boundaries of Albania. The concept of Albanianism was also subtly developed within his encyclopedia.

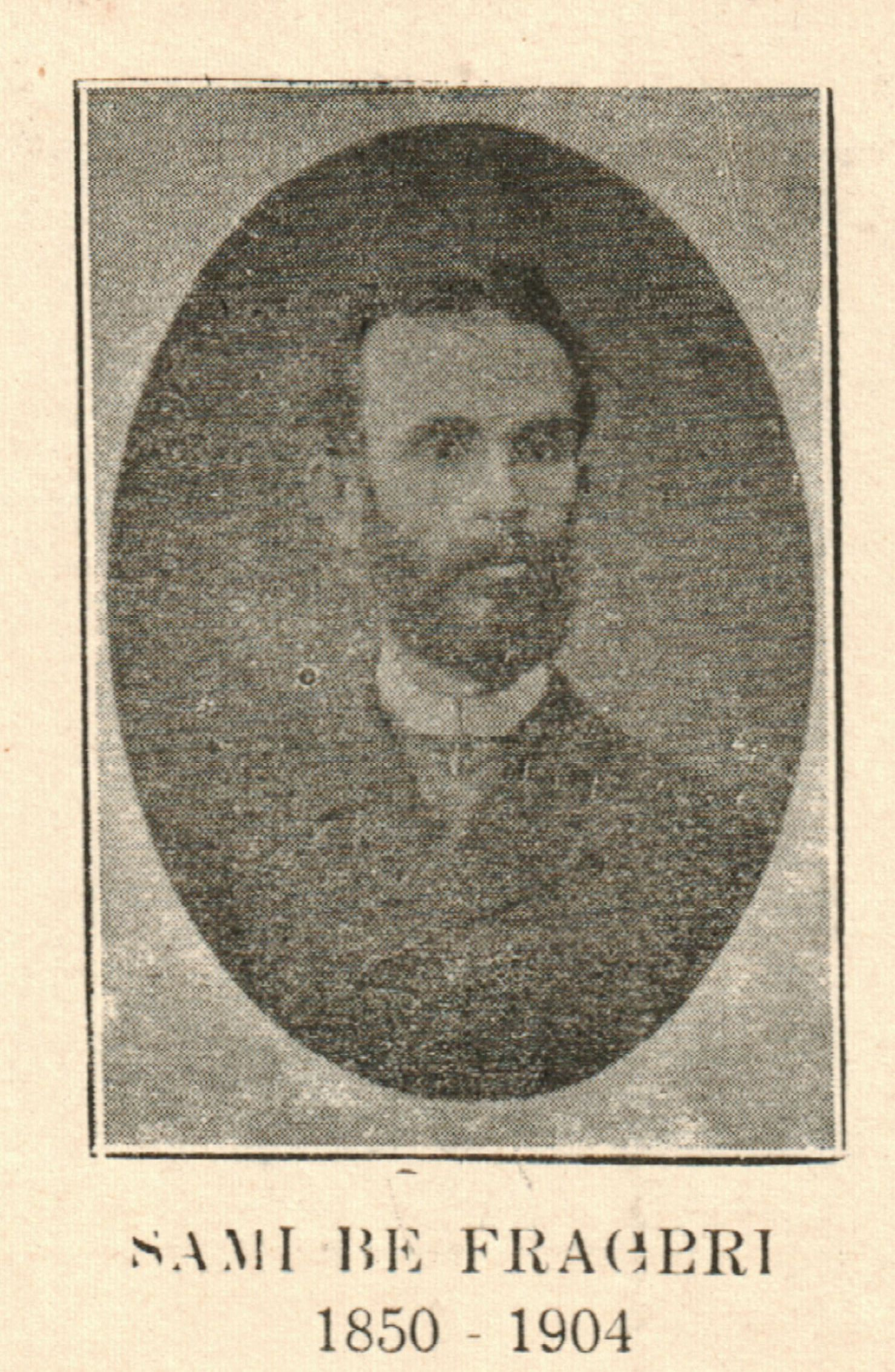
Sami Frashëri, circa early 20th century

In comparison, the article Türk was only three pages and five columns long, despite the greater importance and role of Turks in the Ottoman Empire when compared to Albanians. Tracing their history Frashëri described the Turks as "among Asia's biggest and most famous nations" and the Ottoman Empire as a "Turkish state". Apart from the prominence of Turks and Turkish culture, Frashëri stressed the ethnic and cultural diversity of the Ottoman Empire in his encyclopedia. That theme was embodied in the entry Ottoman, a term Frashëri presented as originating from a great Turkish tribe but shifting in meaning over time to encompass all Ottoman peoples and subjects as a result of reforms following the principle of equality. This definition reflected the Ottomanism of the Tanzimat era.

After being involved with the Albanian movement during the League of Prizren period Frashëri increasingly came under suspicion by the Ottoman government over a number of times. In an investigation of 1890 into Frashëri by authorities, an acquaintance said that he and his brothers worked for eventual Albanian independence by first aiming to unite the Albanian inhabited vilayets into a unitary province within the empire. Ottoman authorities did not act against him and he published a further four volumes of his encyclopedia with the last being in 1899 while continuing with public and private discourses on Albania and Albanians. In 1896, the authors of the Ottoman government provincial almanac for Kosovo titled Kosova Salnamesi credited Frashëri and his encyclopedia as the source for most of their information.

By 1899, a successor organisation to the Prizren League called League of Peja (Besa-Besë) had arisen and Frashëri again attempted to raise public discussion on Albania. He organised an Albanian Committee in Istanbul that supported lower taxes and use of Albanian in government schools in the region. These events saw his position with the state change rapidly and according to recollections by his children in later years a palace official had visited Frashëri at his home and restricted his movements while he was still employed by the government until his death.

==== Political Treatise: Albania: What she has been, What she is, What she shall be ====
Albania cannot exist without the Albanians, the Albanians cannot exist without the Albanian language, and the latter cannot exist without its own alphabet and without schools.

— Sami Frashëri, excerpt from Albania

The aforementioned booklet Albania: What she has been, What she is, What she shall be was first published in Albanian without the author's name in 1899, then in French, and in 1904, right after Şemseddin Sami's death, it was published in Sofia under his name and in Turkish with the condition that it was "literally translated from Albanian". Turkish historians generally do not accept that this work belongs to Şemseddin Sami and consider the event as an effort to gain prestige to Albanian nationalism by using Şemseddin Sami's reputation and prestige. Considering Şemseddin Sami's intense interest in the issues of Turkishness and Ottomanism, especially in his last years, it can be thought that there is some truth in this view. On the other hand, in Albanian works, there is not the slightest doubt that the Albanian manifesto belongs to Şemseddin Sâmi. The booklet was smuggled out of the Ottoman Empire and published in Bucharest with the identity of the author not appearing in the publication. Publishers from Austro-Hungary printed some of Frashëri's most important works containing nationalist themes with Austro-Hungarian Albanologists Theodor Anton Ippen and Baron Nopcsa financing the translation and distribution of his publications. After several months passed from his death the identity of Frashëri as author was revealed on 17 November 1904 by Shahin Kolonja who had published the work and later by a German translation of the booklet in 1913. As in previous publications he repeated certain points such as claiming Albanians as the oldest peoples of Europe, focused on Skanderbeg in a few pages, the Ottoman era in Albania and Albanian contribution to the empire. The second section of the booklet was concentrated on Albania of his time. Frashëri discussed the borders of Albania and Albanian unity despite the Gheg-Tosk subgroups and differences of religion in society. He lamented the lack of progress spanning over twenty years toward developing the Albanian language and the opening of Albanian schools within the Ottoman Empire.

Declaring "I am an Albanian", his work derided identification of Muslim Albanians with Turks and Orthodox Albanians as Rums while he opposed attempts by Greeks to hellenise them and seeking to incorporate Toskëria at a future date into Greece. He believed that Albania and the empire could no longer coexist in the same unit, even if there was a new period of prosperity due to a history of Ottoman prohibition on the development of an national Albanian identity and language. Frashëri worried that Albania would not be able to preserve its nationality because of restrictions on Albanian schooling while at the same time the Porte was allowing rival national movements to act as they pleased, and that this would ultimately lead to the partition of Albania - hence, Albanians had to take matters into their own hands for self-preservation. He preferred Albanian political unity and recognition of Albanian rights achieved by European powers exerting pressure on the empire than an anti-Ottoman revolt, as he thought the empire was on borrowed time and Albanians would need to prepare for creating an independent state. Frashëri proposed that Albanians make a besa to demand the empire and Europe recognize Albanian national rights, especially by applying pressure upon the Ottomans to achieve those aims. He envisioned an autonomous Albanian state with a political parliamentary system, a capital called Skenderbey to be located in central Albania, an Albanian school system, two universities with one each in the north and south and an army of 20,000 men. The nationalisation of the various faiths and sects was envisioned where Catholics would have their own archbishop, Muslims their mufti, Orthodox their Exarch, Bektashi their chief Baba with Jews and Protestants also worshiping in freedom. The booklet by Frashëri overall was an articulation of political Albanianism.

==== Contributions to Turkism ====
Frashëri was a significant contributor to the development of Turkism. From the early 1880s he had an interest in the imperial Ottoman language as expressed in an article "The Ottoman Turkish Language" on 2 November 1881 where Frashëri argued that it was "essentially a Turkish language." These views would appear in articles published during the 1890s where he advocated for the imperial Ottoman language to be simplified and replaced by spoken Turkish, with words and grammatical structures stemming from Arabic and Persian being removed. Frashëri envisaged the emergence of a modern colloquial Turkish language from a disintegration of the imperial Ottoman language and believed that this would benefit society. Frashëri published an Ottoman Turkish dictionary titled Kâmûs-ı Türkî, and in its first two volumes in 1899 he expressed in an introduction that Western Turkish or Ottoman was the same language as its Eastern Turkish counterpart or Chagatai. The difference for him was that Western Turkish had absorbed Persian, Arabic, Italian and Greek words, which Frashëri thought was unnecessary. He viewed the dictionary as the treasury of a language and considered it a necessary tool for Turkish to preserve its beauty. While embracing Turkish as "our language", Frashëri stuck to his Albanian heritage by affirming an Albanian identity and commitment to Albanianism in the dictionary. In word entries on Albania and Albanians he included definitions on being Albanian such as the term Albanianism where an example of its use in a sentence was rendered as "He is not denying his Albanianism/Albanianess" (Arnavudluğunu inkur etmiyor).

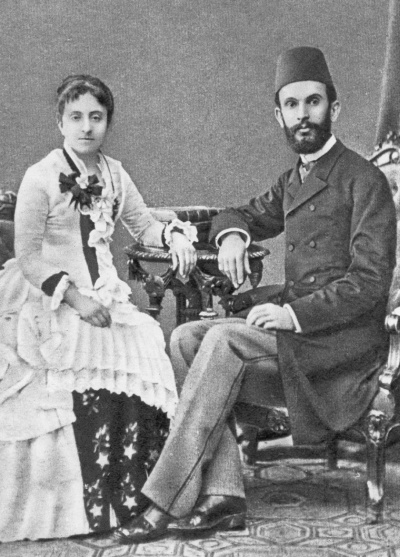
Sami Frashëri and his wife Emine, May 1884.

The choice of wording by Frashëri in labeling the language Turkish as opposed to Ottoman assisted to nurture a national identity among Turkish people. For him his idea of the Ottoman Empire was for Abdul Hamid II to emphasize Ottomanism over Islamism and incorporate concepts like Turkism and Albanianism into the state framework allowing cultural pluralism with Albanians and Turks each developing their own languages and teaching them in schools. He considered cultural and ethnic diversity of the Muslim community as factors that would strengthen Ottoman unity. Frashëri, after several years of work published a 500-page Arabic dictionary (Kâmûs-ı 'Arabî) in 1896 and he also noted that Kurdish lacked a dictionary but was unable to compile it as he lacked linguistic skills in the language. Stories of him working on an Albanian dictionary existed during his lifetime. He failed however to produce one and George Gawrych holds that probably due to the work of his friend Konstantin Kristoforidhi whose Albanian dictionary was published in 1904 he choose to let it be the standard version.

Sami Frashëri also played a role in the later developing Turkish nationalist movement, by translating the works of European Turkology into Turkish and transmitting their Western ideas to Turk audiences. These works would serve as a basis for an emerging Turkish identity, and the early Turkish nationalists were grateful for them. He had close relationships with Turkish nationalist intellectuals Veled Çelebi (İzbudak) and Necip Asım (Yazıksız) and maintained friendships with the writers and publisher of the journal İkdam which contributed to the spread of cultural Turkism and promotion of nationalism within Turkey.

== Legacy ==
Frashëri died on June 18, 1904 aged 54 after a severe illness at his home in Erenköy, Istanbul. He left a number of unpublished manuscripts relating to Turkish studies. Due to his endeavours and work within that field it has earned him a place within Ottoman intellectual history. During his lifetime Frashëri admired European culture and its intellectual achievements while he sought respect and dignity for his Albanian background being himself loyal to the Ottoman Empire. As an Ottoman, like many other Albanians he negotiated the daily reality of the multi-ethnic, linguistic and religious realities of his time appreciating and supporting the diversity of the state while also advocating for Albanianism. He was devoted to both vatans (homelands), the wider Ottoman and his special Albanian one. Frashëri moved socially and intellectually through various communities of Istanbul while having an appreciation of Islam and traditions originating from Arabs and the Ottoman sociopolitical and cultural systems. Along with other Albanians, Albanianism with Ottomanism were seen as being compatible.

As a cultural and political activist Frashëri however ran into trouble with the Ottoman government. Over time he developed a disillusionment with the regime of sultan Abdul Hamid II and increasingly turned to Albanianism. Being an Albanian Tosk he felt frustration with his fellow Albanian Ghegs and other conservative and traditionalist Albanians who he thought were more preoccupied with regional and local matters than with the national issues. Frashëri did not want Albanians to be confused for Turks and he worked to foster the national identities of both ethnic groups. At times tensions existed for him when the categories of Ottomanism and Albanianism and of Turk and Albanian were not in balance. As scholar Francis Trix put it he was "an Ottoman reformer [who] could be both an Albanian patriot and, at the same time, a cultural Turk of the highest order".

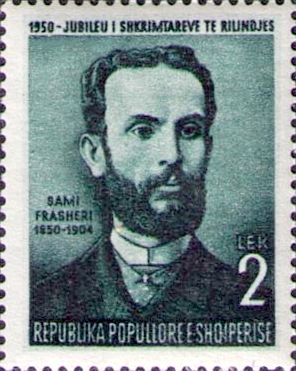
Frashëri on Albanian stamp, 1950

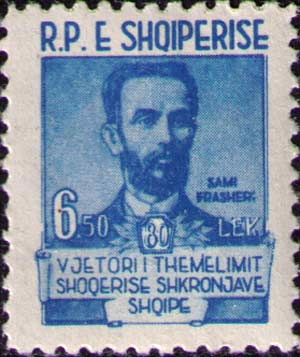
Frashëri on Albanian stamp, 1960

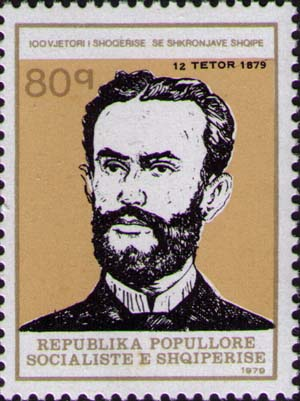
Frashëri on Albanian stamp, 1979

After his death individuals and diverse groups both honoured and claimed him as theirs. Among Turkish circles, the Young Turk newspaper Osmanlı published in Geneva described him in their full front-page obituary as a scholar and great humanitarian that "honored Ottomanism (Osmanlılık)." Yusuf Akçura, an advocate of Turkism and contemporary of Frashëri considered him as a Turkish nationalist. Albanians of the era regarded Frashëri as a patriot, while due to his contributions toward developing a national Albanian literature modern Albanian historians view him as an Albanian nationalist. As the works of Frashëri contain nationalistic discourse, following his death they have retained the attention of the public during different time periods and governments in Albania and Turkey. Within Turkish literary history Frashëri is revered as being a forefather of Turkish literature and a significant innovator for the Turkish language. In Albanian collective memory he is cherished as a founding father of Albanian literature and as one of the rilindas (national awakeners) of the Albanian nation. An Ottoman historian Kemal Karpat summed up his complex identity as "Sami considered himself a 'Turk' because he was a member of the Ottoman state, and he saw no conflict between his Ottoman political identity and his Albanian ethnicity."

The four surviving children of Frashëri remained in Turkey and due to their commitment to the republic Turkish authorities decided in the 1950s not to allow the remains of Sami to leave the country for Albania. His son, Ali Sami Yen (1886–1951), was a footballer and founder of Galatasaray SK and chairman of Galatasaray between 1905–18 and 1925–6.

Nowadays, many schools bear his name, e.g. Sami Frashëri High School, one of the most well-known gymnasiums in Pristina, and another in Tirana, and in other localities such as Bogovinje, North Macedonia and so on.

The Frashëri brothers have been commemorated in Albanian folk songs.

== Work ==
Sami is the author of around 50 works. Some of his most important writings are:

=== Novels ===
- Ta'aşşûk-ı Tal'at ve Fitnât (Albanian: Dashuria e Talatit me Fitneten -English: The Love Between Talat and Fitnat, 1873)

The story carries a sentimental subject of love between Talat and Fitnat. Generally, the novel consists of a combination of Oriental and Western writing styles. Also, this novel is commonly mistaken to be the first novel written in Turkish.

=== Drama ===
- Besâ yâhut Âhde Vefâ (Albanian: "Besa ose Mbajtja e Fjalës" - English: Besa or The Given Word of Trust, 1874).

Is a melodrama aiming Besa as a subject, but in a very tragic situation; the father kills his son to keep the given word.

- Seydi Yahya (1875)
- Gâve (1876)
- Mezalim-i Endülûs (Never printed)
- Vicdân (Never printed)

=== Dictionaries and encyclopedical works ===
- Kâmûs-ı Fransevî (1882–1905, French-Turkish dictionary)
- Kâmûs-ı Fransevî (1885, French-Turkish dictionary)
- Küçük Kâmûs-ı Fransevî (1886, French-Turkish dictionary)
- Kâmûsü'l-A'lâm (6 volumes, 1889–1898, Encyclopedia of General Science, known to be the first Encyclopedia printed in Turkish)
- Kâmûs-ı 'Arabî (1898, Arabic-Turkish dictionary, unfinished)
- Kâmûs-ı Türkî (2 volumes, dictionary of the Classical Ottoman Turkish language, still widely used as a reference as of today, 1899–1900, reprints and facsimiles in 1978 and 1998)

=== Scientific writings ===
Şemseddin Sami also did a series of scientific writings in Albanian such as Qielli (Sky), Toka (Earth), Njeriu (Human Being), Gjuha (Language), and many more.

=== Educational writings in Albanian ===
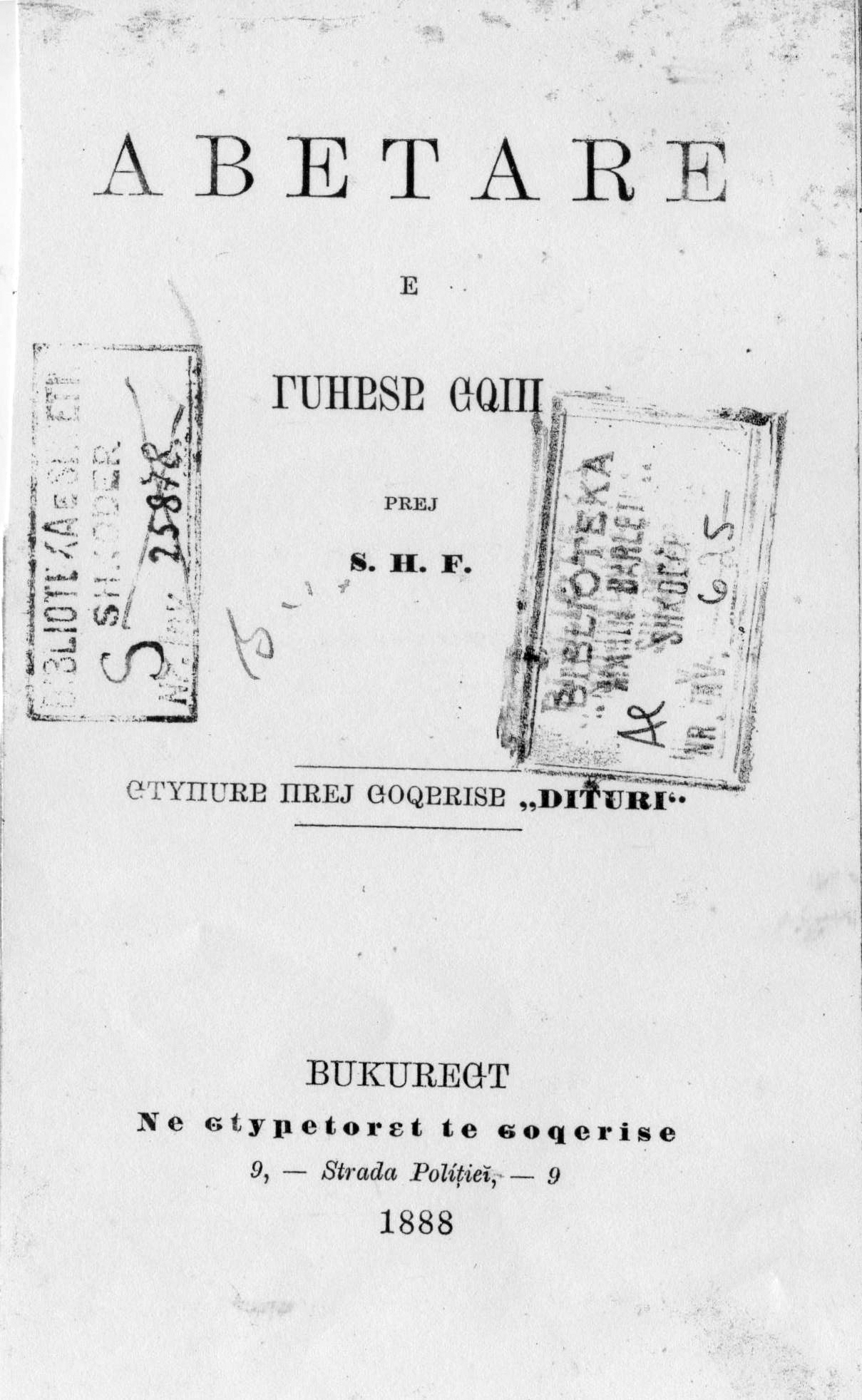
Title page of alphabet book in 1888.

- Allfabetarja e Stambollit (Alphabet of Istanbul, 1879)
- Abetarja e Shkronjëtoreja (Grammatical Work, 1886)

=== Other ===
In Turkish in his "Pocket Library" collection, he published small scientific booklets on subjects as astronomy, geology, anthropology, history of Islam and the Islamic civilization, women, mythology and linguistics. He also published a small compilation of humor named Letâ'if in two volumes, a compilation of proverbs and quotes named Emsâl in four volumes, and a series of reading-oriented educational books for schoolchildren. During Ebüzziya Tevfiks exile, Frashëri managed the Ottoman journal Muharrir.

=== Language studies and linguistics ===
- Usûl-ü Tenkîd ve Tertîb (1886, Orthography of Turkish)
- Nev-usûl Sarf-ı Türkî (1891, Modern Turkish Grammar)
- Yeñi Usûl-ü Elifbâ-yı Türkî (1898, New Turkish Alphabetical System)
- Usûl-ü Cedîd-i Kavâ'id-i 'Arabiyye (1910, New Method for Learning Arabic)
- Tatbîkât-ı 'Arabiyye (1911, Exercises in Arabic)

=== Political work ===
- Shqipëria ç'ka qenë, ç'është e çdo të bëhetë (Albania - what it was, what it is and what it will be, 1899).
  - Theoretical commentary that became Rilindja Kombëtare's manifesto.
