= Poda =

Poda may refer to:

== Places ==
- Poda Protected Area, Bulgaria
- Poda, Gacko, Bosnia and Herzegovina
- Poda, Jablanica, Bosnia and Herzegovina
- Poda, Bijelo Polje, Montenegro
- Poda (Sjenica), Serbia
- Podë, Albania, a deserted village
- Koh Poda or Poda Island, Thailand

== People with the surname ==
- Zylyftar Poda, Albanian leader of early 1800s
- Nikolaus Poda von Neuhaus (1723–1798), Austrian entomologist
- John Poda, politician from Ohio
