= Battle of Leskovik =

- Part of World War II in Albania
| Date | 15–19 May 1943 |
| Location | Leskovik, Albania |
| Result | LANÇ victory; Italian retreat from Leskovik; Partisans set up an administration in Leskovik |

Belligerents
| LANÇ | Italy: (Kingdom of Albania in personal union with Italy) Italian protectorate of Albania |

Commanders and leaders
| Nexhip Vinçani | (Kingdom of Albania in personal union with Italy) Mustafa Merlika-Kruja |

Strength
| 600–700 partisans | 400 Italian soldiers 40 machine guns 5 mortars |

Casualties and losses
| 4 killed 12 wounded | 200 killed 150 wounded 40 captured 12 trucks captured 2 tanks destroyed |

The Battle of Leskovik (Albanian: Beteja e Leskovikut; 15–19 May 1943) was a battle between the Albanian resistance and the Kingdom of Italy in Leskovik.

Leskovik was strategically important for the partisans as the annihilation of this garrison broke the connection between the two Italian garrisons, it expanded LANÇ's bases and connected the partisan bases of the Korça and Gjirokastra districts.

== The strategic position of Leskovik ==
The garrison of Leskovik was placed in a key position to secure the strategic road that connected the forces of the 4th Army of southern Albania with those of the 6th Army in northern Greece. After the capitulation of Italy and during the German invasion of Albania the Germans used the military infrastructure in Korça to supply their troops in Greece.

== Battle ==
=== Italian units in Leskovik ===
In the vicinity of Leskovik, a concentration of military personnel took place under the control of the Italian Army. This assembly included an infantry company from the "Arezzo" division, another company associated with the Financial Guard, and a contingent of carabinieri, totaling around 400 soldiers. Their armament consisted of 81mm mortars and a combination of 40 heavy and light machine guns. Notably, the separate units of the opposing forces maintained a distance of approximately 200–300 meters between them. The stronghold was strategically encircled by multiple points of fire and tactical obstacles, bolstering its defensive capabilities.

=== Partisan units in Leskovik ===
A total of 12 detachments consisting of partisans hailing from the Korça district engaged in the operation, comprising approximately 600 to 700 individuals. The partisan units designated for action included those from Gora, Opar, Devolli, Rrëza e Korça, "Tomori," Kurora, Leskovik, Kolonja, as well as two additional detachments. Their primary objective was the offensive targeting of Leskovik. Meanwhile, the detachments located in Vithkuqi and Ostrovica undertook positions for ambush along the routes Erseke-Leskovik and Permet-Leskovik.

The partisans were armed with 40 to 50 machine guns alongside a complement of mortars. Diligent efforts were invested in stockpiling a substantial quantity of ammunition. Each rifle was supplied with 50 to 70 rounds, while machine guns were provisioned with 300 to 500 rounds each. Mortars were backed by an inventory of 15 to 20 shells per unit. Contingency plans encompassed the sustained engagement of battle through the allocation of ammunition reserves accrued prior to the conflict.

=== The partisan offensive ===
The transition from the concentration area to the attack and ambush sites commenced during the night, after 21:00 hours. The partisan units traversed multiple parallel routes and arrived at their designated target locations at the predetermined times. Upon reaching Leskovik, detachment commanders orchestrated collaborative strategies. The offensive was initiated just before dawn, at 03:00. Partisan forces implemented coordinated group assaults from various directions, progressively narrowing the encirclement and compelling the enemy to seek refuge within the barracks and fortified positions. Machine guns were strategically deployed to facilitate the advance of assault units, enabling them to approach enemy firing points before employing hand grenades. The situation prompted the Italian command to activate their aviation resources, reserved only for the most critical circumstances. The Italians were forced to use airplanes from the bases of Tirana and Ioannina to save the garrison. The guerrillas, despite the bombardment by Italian planes, held the city for 15 hours. A squadron of five planes executed 36 sorties, indiscriminately bombing and strafing both partisan troops and civilian residences in Leskovik and across the ambush locations.

Sustained attacks on the barracks continued for approximately 15 hours, with the availability of ammunition playing a pivotal role. Responding to the besieged garrison's predicament, two battalions supported by armored vehicles were dispatched to provide relief: one from Ersekë and the other from Tepelenë, but most of these reinforcements fell prey to guerrilla attacks assisted by the Special Operations Executive.

Meanwhile, the partisan forces, undeterred from their mission, strategically positioned themselves in ambushes along the Leskovik-Ersekë road, spanning the Shala-Sanjollas-Barmash area. The Italians were forced to evacuate not only Leskovik but also the Perat Bridge. After that, in retaliation, the Italians burned five villages in Mugra from Leskovik to Korce.

The advantageous use of terrain and numerical superiority enabled the creation of a series of contiguous ambushes spanning 9 kilometers. At the ambush at Shala bridge, forces were strategically deployed on both flanks of the road, complemented by engineering efforts such as road demolition and the placement of obstructions. Upon the retreat from the Leskovik garrison, the Italian "Arezzo" division encountered an ambush near the Shala bridge. Following two hours of intense engagement, the convoy halted at the Sanjollas ambush site, where prolonged night-time combat persisted for over 10 hours, including the effective deployment of close-quarters hand grenade attacks.

The operation was undertaken by the partisan detachments of Korça, commanded by Nexhip Vinçani. Smiley fails to give the total Italian casualties, but he confirms the execution of 33 Italian soldiers by the partisans in the Shala ambush.

The consistent barrage of attacks along the routes compelled the Italians to eventually withdraw their forces from the Leskovik garrison after a few days. Subsequently, the Italian army's inter-army communication predominantly relied on air channels.

== Aftermath ==
The battles in Leskovik underscored the need for enhanced direction through staff roles in large-scale operations, an aspect that would be refined in the subsequent Përmet battle. Following the Leskovik battle, South Albania was effectively controlled by the partisans and the vast majority of Italian troops withdrew.
