= Spiro Bellkameni =

Albanian kachak, revolutionary and activist involved in the Albanian National Awakening

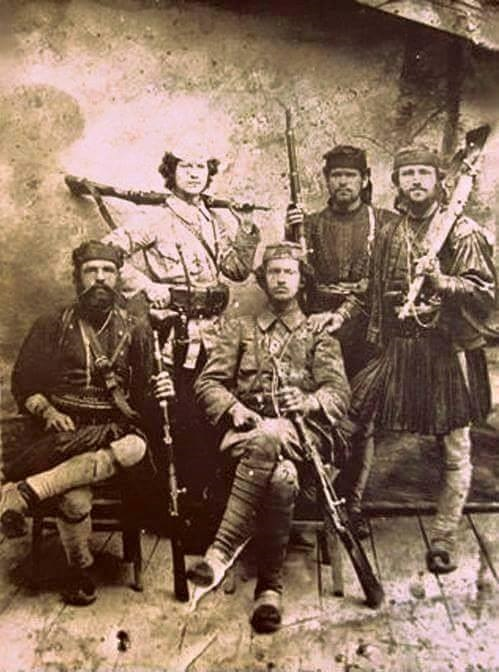
Myftar Butka, Mihal Ballkameni, Thoma Pituli, Spiro Ballkameni (centre seated) and Gani Butka

Spiro Bellkameni (1885-1912) was an Albanian kachak, revolutionary and activist of the Albanian National Awakening. He led one of the most important bands during the Albanian revolts of the 1900-1910s. Bellkameni's band operated around south-eastern Albania and worked closely with other Albanian revolutionary groups in the region, particularly that of Sali Butka's.

== Life ==
Born in Bellkameni, in the Manastir Vilayet of the Ottoman Empire in 1885 he was a close associate of Themistokli Gërmenji and Mihal Grameno. In 1906 he was a member of Bajo Topulli's band that assassinated the Greek Orthodox bishop of Korçë Photios as retribution for the assassination of Kristo Negovani, which was instigated by Photios.

In March of 1911, Spiro returned from exile to the village of Butkë near Kolonjë, where he spent some time with the çeta of fellow Albanian revolutionary Sali Butka. In order to grow the revolutionary movement, Butka organised the formation of a separate çeta detachment under Spiro's command, which originally consisted of Sali's brother Myftar, Sali's son Gani and Thoma Pituli; this detachment was sent to the lowlands of Korçë, where they made a name for themselves in the Albanian Revolt of 1911 by defeating an Ottoman contingent in Mali i Thatë. Six members of the çeta were killed during this time, and were later declared martyrs of Albania. Together with the fellow Albanian armed bands of Sali Butka and Kajo Babjeni, Spiro Bellkameni and his fighters briefly liberated Korçë in August of 1912.

Spiro's band consisted of both Muslim and Christian Albanians. Despite the fact that the majority of his band consisted of Muslims, they had no qualms in electing Spiro - an Orthodox Albanian - to be their leader.

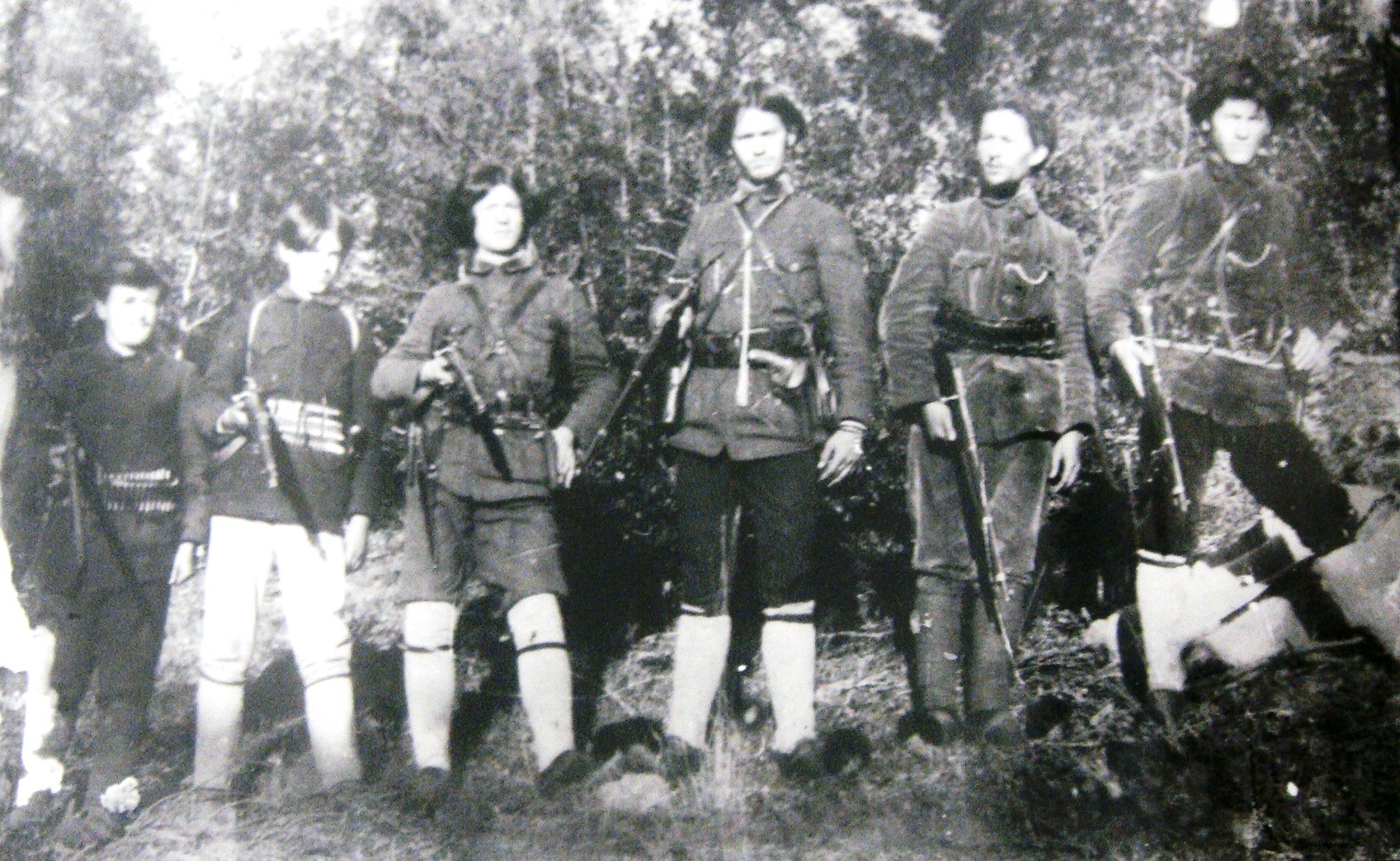
Spiro (centre) and his band
