= Teofik Bekteshi =

Albanian politician

Teofik Bekteshi was an Albanian politician and mayor of Elbasan from 1942 to 1943.
