= Ymer Saraçi =

Albanian politician

Ymer Saraçi was an Albanian politician and mayor of Elbasan from 1939 to 1942.

== See also ==
- Alush Saraçi
