= Shahin Kolonja =

Albanian politician and journalist

Shahin Kolonja Shahin Teki Kolonja
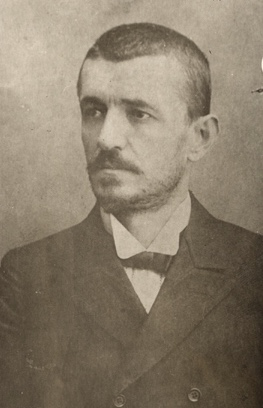

Member of the Chamber of Deputies in the General Assembly of the Ottoman Empire
- In office 23 December 1908 – 17 January 1912
- Sultan: Abdülhamid II; Mehmed V
- Grand Vizier: Kâmil Pasha; Hüseyin Hilmi Pasha; Ahmet Tevfik Pasha; Ibrahim Hakki Pasha; Mehmed Said Pasha
- Constituency: Sanjak of Görice

Personal details
- Born: Shahin Teki Ypi; 1865 Starje, Ottoman Empire (modern day Albania)
- Died: 1919 (aged 53–54) Istanbul, Ottoman Empire (modern day Turkey)
- Relations: Süleyman Pasha, mutasarrif of Plevlje (Grandfather)
- Parent: Karahman bey (Father)
- Occupation: Politician, civil servant, publisher
- Known for: Drita magazine Congress of Monastir

Shahin bey Kolonja (Turkish: Şahin Teki Kolonya; 1865–1919) was an Albanian journalist, politician, and member of the Ottoman Parliament during its Second Constitutional Era.

== Early life ==
Shahin Kolonja, was born Shahin Teki Ypi in 1865 or 1867 in Starje, Kolonjë, at that time part of the Ottoman Empire. He came from a well-known Bektashi family of the area and was the son of Karahman bey and the grandson of Süleyman Pasha, mutasarrif of Plevlje.

Kolonja was a graduate of the school of civil service (mülkiye) and had served as director of several idadiye schools, initially in Edirne. He was one of the Albanians employed in the Ottoman public administration and was for a time the mutasarrif of the sanjak of Mount Athos (Aynaroz). He abandoned civil service in order to follow other lifetime pursuits and beliefs. Later he was arrested in Bitola and sentenced to three years in prison for disseminating Albanian-language works. In 1897 he wrote a memorandum to the Ottoman authorities for a permission to publish a newspaper in Albanian. The request was rejected. Two years later he asked help from the Austro-Hungarian counsel in Monastir for help in publishing the newspaper. Due to difficulties and continuous surveillance from the authorities, he had to leaeve the country. Kolonja went to various countries in Europe, finally settling in Sofia.

== Publicist and political activity ==
From 1901 to 1908 he published in Sofia the journal Drita, task which was initially handled by Petro Poga, with the help of Kristo Luarasi (1876-1934) and financial support of Austro-Hungary. Luarasi was serving as the manager of the printing press "Mbrothësia" ("Progress"). The printing press was previously established by the Albanian colony of Sofia, grouped mainly under the "Dëshira" (Desire) Society, with the aim of spreading knowledge and Albanian-language instructions between Albanians, and serving the national cause.

Through the newspaper, Kolonja and Luarasi would intensively work for sharpening the national conscience of the Albanian, and providing books in Albanian. Kolonja's written works in Drita and other media highlighted the socio-economic aspect of the Albanian national movement by critiquing the Ottoman aristocratic class, to whom he belonged being a bey, and noting the plight of the peasantry. Kolonja advocated for an Albanian national awakening and the security of national existence through a better constitutional relationship between Albanians and the Ottoman Empire, however also supported the activities of armed Albanian guerilla bands fighting the empire.

While in Sofia, Kolonja would support Mustafa Ragib, a pro Young Turk revolutionary of Bulgaria. With Kolonja's help, Ragib restarted publishing his newspaper Efkar-ı Umumiye ("Public Opinion") in Bulgarian and Turkish. "Public Opinion" consequently dedicated many of its pages to Albanian affairs as well, and publicized Albanian nationalistic materials. Even this would not go unnoticed from Ottoman authorities which would recall Ragib to disconnect him from Kolonja's influence.

Kolonja distrusted the Arbëreshë (Italo-Albanians), whom he viewed as pawns of the Italian government advocating for Italian positions toward the Albanian question and refused to cooperate with them. During the late Ottoman period, Kolonja supported Austro-Hungarian assistance toward Albanian geopolitical interests in the Balkans.

In 1904, Kolonja translated into Ottoman Turkish and published in Drita the manifesto of Albanian National Awakening, Sami Frashëri's "Shqipëria ç'ka qenë, ç'është e çdo të bëhetë" ("Albania - what it was, what it is and what it will be") of 1889.

In 1906, Kolonja was involved in recruitment activities abroad for the revolutionary Albanian Manastir Committee among the Albanian diaspora in Bucharest and Constanta, Sofia, and in Egypt.

In 1908, Kolonja was elected deputy of Korçë in the Ottoman parliament with the financial support of Albanian activists. He was a prominent member of the 26 assemblymen that represented the four Albanian Vilayets. At the same year he became one of the delegates of Congress of Monastir, in which the Albanian alphabet was standardized.

Emerging from deliberations by some delegates during the Manastir Congress, Kolonja as a parliamentarian intended to present the Ottoman with a programme on Albanian education. The programme envisaged Albanian primary and elementary schooling, Greek state funding cut for schools with Orthodox Albanian students and replaced with Ottoman state funds and revenue from church property, training of academics abroad for the establishment of an Albanian university and Catholic and Orthodox clergy to be paid by the Ottoman Empire. Kolonja's programme also advocated for Albanian military service in Albanian inhabited lands, an Albanian gendarmerie, local Albanian ownership of transport infrastructure and exploitation of natural resources, open free vote and revenue collection with recognition of Albanian nationality and language.

In 1908 he joined the Ahrar' Party founded by Ismail Qemali, and in 1910 the Democrat Party founded by Ibrahim Temo and Abdullah Cevdet. Due to hostilities with the Young Turks he had to go abroad again in 1911. After spending a couple of months in Vlora in 1913, he moved back to Istanbul in 1915 with this family. Kolonja was married to Naim Frashëri's daughter.

From this time until his death in 1919 he did not participate any political activities, due to health problems and alcohol dependency.

== See also ==
- Society for the Publication of Albanian Writings
- Vatra, the Pan-Albanian Federation of America

== Sources ==
=== References ===
- Clayer, Nathalie (2013a), "The Albanian students of the Mekteb-i Mülkiye", in Özdalga, Elisabeth (ed.), Late Ottoman Society: The Intellectual Legacy, Routledge Courzon, ISBN 978-1-134-29473-2
- Clayer, Nathalie (2013b), "Appendix", in Özdalga, Elisabeth (ed.), Late Ottoman Society: The Intellectual Legacy, Routledge Courzon, ISBN 978-1-134-29473-2
- Tako, Piro (1984), Shanin Kolonja (Ypi): Jeta dhe veprimtaria atdhetare e publicistike (in Albanian), 8 Nëntori, OCLC 66803008
