= Tetova (surname) =

Tetova is a surname. Notable people with the surname include:

- Edlir Tetova (born 1983), Albanian football coach and former player
- Tajar Tetova, Albanian military commander
