= Behexhed Hydi =

Albanian politician and mayor

Behexhed Hydi was an Albanian politician and mayor of Elbasan from 1925 through 1928.
