= Kajo Babjeni =

Albanian kachak, revolutionary and activist involved in the Albanian National Awakening

Kajo Babjeni (1833–1923) was an Albanian kachak, revolutionary and activist of the Albanian National Awakening from the Gorë region of south-eastern Albania. He was known as Kapedani i Gorës ('The Captain of Gorë') and led an armed band in the Gorë region.

== Biography ==
Babjeni was born in the village of Babjen. He came from a family of kachak fighters; his maternal uncle was Shahin Matraku, a well-known kachak, and Kajo was initially part of his uncle's çeta (band of fighters). Kajo Babjeni, in the final decade of the 19th century, formed his own çeta to fight against the Ottoman Turks. Babjeni's armed band of Gorë consisted of 50-60 members, but on certain occasions could have reached up to 300 men. They alternated between the regions around Korçë and the regions around the lakes of Ohër and Prespa.

Together with the fellow Albanian armed bands of Sali Butka and Spiro Bellkameni, Babjeni and his fighters briefly liberated Korçë in August 1912. When the Hellenic Army invaded southern Albania, they began to attack Korçë on 5 July 1914; Kajo Babjeni defended Nikolicë with 200 soldiers. After Greek military groups entered Korçë later in 1914 under the guise of desertion, they began to loot the shops and homes of Muslim Albanians, as well as committing murders and rapes; Albanian armed groups, including that of Babjeni's, immediately responded by resuming their activities and eventually forced the Greeks to retreat from the city. After the French army occupied Korçë on 18 October 1916, local Albanian leaders including Sali Butka, Themistokli Gërmenji and Babjeni coordinated their efforts and took measures to protect against the further fragmentation of Albanian lands; they created the Committee of Defense (Komiteti i Mbrojtjes), surrounded the city with their forces and began negotiations with the French that ultimately culminated in the creation of the Autonomous Province of Korçë.
