= Qemal Butka =

Albanian architect and politician (1907–1997)

Mayor of Tirana
- In office 21 October 1935 – 7 November 1936
- Preceded by: Abedin Nepravishta
- Succeeded by: Abedin Nepravishta

Personal details
- Born: 1907 Butkë, Ottoman Empire
- Died: 28 November 1997 (aged 89–90) Tirana, Albania
- Education: TU Wien
- Profession: Architect

Qemal Butka (1907 – November 28, 1997) was an Albanian architect, painter, politician, and postage stamps engraver. He was mayor of Tirana from 1935 to 1936 but departed from Albania in 1939 to live in Turkey and later the United States. He is also known for projecting several monuments and buildings in Albania.

== Life ==
Qemal Butka was born in 1907 in the village of Butkë, Ottoman Empire, now in the Kolonjë District, modern Albania. His father was killed during World War I, and he was raised by his uncle and Albanian patriot, Sali Butka. His cousin Safet Butka, Sali's son, took him to Austria while he was studying there. Qemal finished his secondary education in Austria and in 1931 he graduated from Vienna University of Technology, with the title of architect engineer.

While a high school student, Butka endeavored in painting; he worked on two well known paintings of Ismail Qemali and of Bajram Curri in 1927, and also on a postcard with the theme of respecting religions.

In 1931, upon graduation, Butka returned to Albania and worked mostly on architectural projects. Because of his talent, Zog of Albania declared him the winning architect of the international competition which decided who would design the memorial dedicated to Sadijé Toptani, Zog's mother, who had died in 1934. The monument, located in what is now the Tirana Park on the Artificial Lake, was destroyed by the Communist government in the 1950s. A replica was built in 2012 to serve as the Mausoleum of the Albanian Royal Family.

Among his other famous works in Albania are the building of the National Library of Albania, a Monument to the National Freedom, the building of the municipality of Korçë, and a 25th anniversary commemorative plaque of the Albanian Declaration of Independence.

Qemal Butka distinguished himself in the construction of villas in Tirana, Durrës and other Albanian cities, which still stand today as testimony of a very solid architecture. Butka is known to have engraved many series of postage stamps, distinguishing himself in the philately field; his stamps' series of the 25th anniversary of the Albanian Independence will be remembered as a notable series.

From 21 October 1935 to 7 November 1936 Qemal Butka was nominated as mayor by Mehdi Frasheri, then Prime Minister of Albania.

In 1939, after Fascist Italy invaded Albania, Butka emigrated to Turkey via Greece along with Albanian writer Branko Merxhani. He stayed in Turkey from 1940 to 1958 with the exception of the 1943-1945 period when he went to Cairo, Egypt for work. In Turkey he met and married his future wife, Cecile, daughter of Mehmet Kamil Berk, who was the personal doctor of Kemal Atatürk, founder of modern Turkey. Cecile herself was an architect.

In 1958 Butka and wife emigrated to the United States, where they resided until the 1990s. In the US Butka worked as an architect in prestigious studios, whereas his wife, Cecile, participated in the construction project of the Twin Towers of New York City. Several times Qemal Butka tried to visit Albania as a US citizen, but his entry was refused by Communist authorities. He managed to do so only in 1987 through Austria after the death of Albanian dictator Enver Hoxha. After 1990 he definitively returned to Albania, where he died on November 28, 1997.
