= Ymeri =

Ymeri is a surname. Notable people with the surname include:

- Rustem Ymeri, Albanian politician
- Visar Ymeri (born 1973), Kosovar activist
