= Petrit Dume =

Albanian politician and general

Major General Petrit Dume
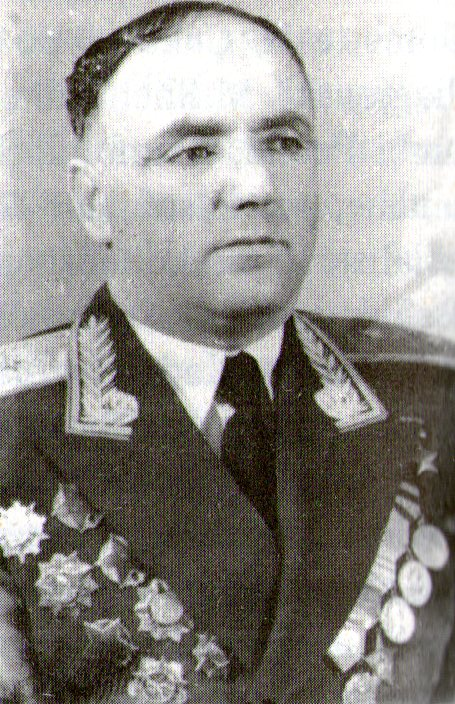
- Born: Petrit Taulla Dume; 20 May 1920; Starje, Principality of Albania
- Died: 5 December 1975 (aged 55); Tirana, People's Republic of Albania
- Military career
- Branch: LANÇ; Albanian People's Army
- Service years: 1942–1975
- Rank: Major General
- Conflicts: Second World War

Petrit Taulla Dume (20 May 1920 – 5 December 1975) was an Albanian general and politician of the Albanian Party of Labour (PPSh).

== Life ==
Dume was born in 1920 in Starje, a village in Kolonjë District. During the Second World War (1942–44) he participated as a partisan of the communist and anti-fascist National Liberation Movement. He was the last commander of the partisan battalion "Hakmarrja" (Revenge).

After the founding of the People's Republic of Albania on 11 January 1946, he joined the Albanian People's Army and increased his influence over time as commander of a brigade and then as division commander.

Between 1948 and 1974, he served as representative of Ersekë in the National Assembly. At the same time he was a member of the Central Committee of the Party.

Dume, who graduated from the General Staff Academy named after "Marshal Kliment Voroshilov" in Moscow, was finally appointed Chief of the General Staff of the Armed Forces in 1953. Between 1957 and 1974, he was Major General and Deputy Minister of Defence. In this role, he participated in December 1973 as head of a military delegation on a visit to the People's Liberation Army.

At the 4th Congress of the PPSh in February 1961, he became candidate-member of the Politburo of the Party of Labour of Albania, and member of the Central Committee of Party. He carried on these duties until July 1974.

Petrit Dume was among the 154 persons to whom the title Hero of the People was awarded.

== Trial and execution ==
In July 1974, he was pinpointed as associate of Defense Minister Beqir Balluku for inciting revisionist ideas and put on trial in a military court for an alleged attempt of coup d'etat, consequently accused of treason.

He was condemned to death soon after and executed in Tirana, together with Balluku and the head of the General Political Bureau of the Armed Forces, Hito Çako. He was immediately succeeded as Chief of General Staff by Sami Metollari, but in 1975 Veli Llakaj took over.

On 18 July 2000, after the collapse of communism in Albania, at the request of his family, his body was exhumed from a secret grave in Horë-Vranisht in Vlorë District, together with those of the other generals that shared his fate.

== Legacy ==
The football club Partizani Tirana carries the nickname "Futboll Club Gjeneral Petrit Dume" in his honor.
