= Qendër Leskovik =

- Administrative unit
- Location within Albania
- Coordinates: 40°13′N 20°37′E
- Country: Albania
- County: Korçë
- Municipality: Kolonjë
  - Administrative unit: 216.3 km^{2} (83.5 sq mi)

Population (2023)
  - Administrative unit: 173
  - Administrative unit density: 0.800/km^{2} (2.07/sq mi)
- Time zone: UTC+1 (CET)
  - Summer (DST): UTC+2 (CEST)
- Postal Code: 7402
- Area Code: (0)871

Qendër Leskovik is a former municipality in the Korçë County, southeastern Albania. At the 2015 local government reform it became a subdivision of the municipality Kolonjë. The population as of the 2023 census is 173.

Historical population
Year	Pop.	±%
1989	1,520	—
2001	857	−43.6%
2011	416	−51.5%
2023	173	−58.4%

The municipal unit consists of the villages Pobickë, Cerckë, Radat, Radovë, Postenan, Lashovë, Peshtan, Podë, Kovaçisht, Vrepckë, Gërmenj, Radanj, Glinë and Gjirakar.
