= Safet Butka =

Albanian politician

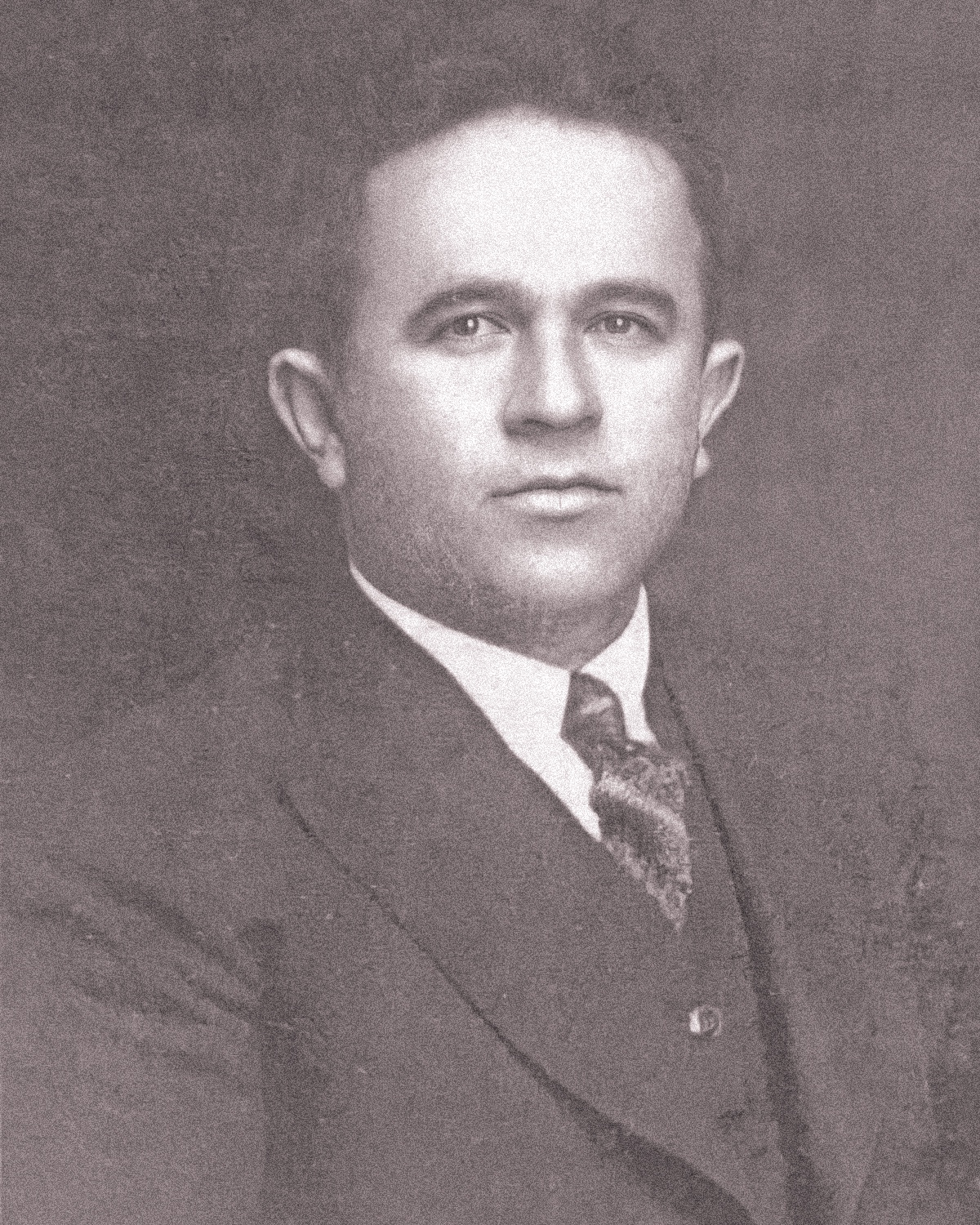
- Born: 10 August 1901; Butkë, Kolonjë, Ottoman Empire
- Died: 19 September 1943 (aged 42); Melçan, Korçë, German occupied Albania
- Cause of death: Suicide
- Education: University of Graz
- Title: Co-Founder of Balli Kombëtar
- Political party: Balli Kombëtar
- Opponent: Communist Party
- Father: Sali Butka
- Relatives: Qemal Butka (Cousin)

Safet Butka (10 August 1901 – 19 September 1943) was an Albanian professor, politician and nationalist. Son of famous patriot Sali Butka, he organized the student demonstrations in April 1939 during the Italian invasion and was interned in Ventotene. Upon his return he organized antifascist movements in his native region and was one of the founders of the nationalist organization Balli Kombëtar. Distressed by internal civil war in Albania, he killed himself in 1943.

== Early life ==
Safet Butka was born in Butkë, Kolonjë District, southern Albania on August 10, 1901. He was the fifth child of Sali Butka, a 19th-century nationalist figure, kachak, poet, and one of the delegates of the city of Korçë to the Albanian National Congress of Lushnjë. After he finished elementary school in his native village, he went for further studies in Linz, Austria, where he finished high school. During his stay in Linz he took under his wing his younger cousin, Qemal Butka, a famous Albanian architect who would later become the mayor of Tirana. After high school, Safet Butka went on to study in the University of Graz where he graduated with honors in Philosophy in 1928.

During his stay in Austria, he was the organizer of the student association Albania. He also published a collection of selected Naim Frashëri poetry and in 1925 a study on Naim Frashëri's work. He returned to Albania in 1928 and was appointed professor in the French Lycee of Korçë. In 1929 he married Hatixhe Lubonja, with whom he had 4 children, Sali, Iljaz, Uran and Tefta Butka.

From 1928 to 1939 he worked as a teacher and principal in various high schools in the Albanian cities of Korcë, Vlorë and Gjirokastër. Professor Safet Butka was also a former Principal of the Tirana Lycee. He was also the director of the first Albanian Educators club and was one of the first professors to apply western methods in the teaching process in his country. Following his youth's work, he also organized the return of Naim Frashëri's remains from Turkey to Albania. At this time he also published many works and articles in pedagogical, social and philosophical journals. His career ended in 1939 when he was the director of the State Gymnasium of Tirana. He was one of the organizers of the student demonstrations in April 1939 during the Italian invasion of Albania and on 28 November 1939 (Albanian independence day). For these activities he was arrested, charged as an antifascist, and later interned in on Ventotene island, Italy, by the fascist authorities.

== World War II activities ==
Butka had been interned in Italy for two years until he was released in August 1942 and allowed to return to Albania. He then took to the mountains and became an outstanding leader of the Balli Kombëtar movement in the Korçë area. The nucleus of his guerrilla group was composed of 70 seasoned and highly experienced warriors, which in case of emergency could become a thousand men strong. The Butka group had been giving valuable assistance to the fighters at Vlorë and had recovered from the military depots in the village of Dardhe, Suli, Graçan, Progri, Pleshishti, and Verbinj all the agricultural produce (corn, tobacco, wool, etc.) which the Italians had requisitioned and restored to its owners.

His forces attacked Italians on Floq in January 1943, Vithkuq in March 1943 and in the Battle of Pocestë in September 1943. Accompanied by British officers (Captain David Smiley and Major Neil McLean (politician)), his forces also attacked a German convoy in Barmash on 13 August 1943.

On 25 March 1943, Butke's forces engaged and defeated a whole Italian detachment in the vicinity of Voskopoje, a locality in the mountainous region to the west of Korçë. There were considerable casualties on both sides, but the volunteer and guerrilla group killed the greater number of Italian soldiers and the remnant surrendered and were taken prisoner. This same group attacked the enemy headquarters at Voskopoje, where Safet Butka Liberated all the political prisoners, and he took from the military depots at Erseke an important quantity of arms and munitions.

Butka was one of the founders of Balli Kombëtar, a patriotic organization dating to World War II. Although a staunch nationalist, he tried at various times to cooperate with the Communist-dominated Liberation Front. In February 1943 he organized a meeting with Communist representatives and an agreement for cooperation was reached in March 1943. He also made another local agreement in August 1943 and was one of the initiators and supporters of the Mukje Agreement.

After the denouncement of the Mukje Agreement by Albanian communists, he was exasperated. He feared a civil war between Albanians and when asked on the matter, always stated that The only Albanian that I will kill will be myself. From 9 to 13 September in Pocestë, the forces of Safet Butka, together with partisan forces attacked the Italian convoy that was retreating from the city of Korçë, blocking its progress for 5 days. On his way home he was informed of the first clashes between Albanian partisans and Balli Kombëtar. Upon hearing such news, he killed himself on 19 September 1943 in the village of Melçan, faithful to his word.

== See also ==
- History of Albania
