= Qazim Sejdini =

Albanian politician

Qazim Sejdini (born February 12, 1951-12 June, 2024) was an Albanian politician serving as mayor of Elbasan, Albania since 2007. Sejdini was nominated by the SPA to run for mayor and won in the February 18 election. He was sworn into office in May 2007 and was mayor of Elbasan until 2019.
