= Podë, Albania =

Podë
- Village
- Location within Albania
- Coordinates: 40°17′N 20°37′E
- Country: Albania
- County: Korçë
- Municipality: Kolonjë
- Administrative unit: Qendër Leskovik
- Time zone: UTC+1 (CET)
  - Summer (DST): UTC+2 (CEST)

Podë is a village in Korçë County, southeastern Albania. It is located between Ersekë and Leskovik. Today, it is a depopulated village with only 11 houses. At the 2015 local government reform it became part of the municipality Kolonjë.

== Notable people ==
- Zylyftar Poda, leader of the Albanian revolt of 1832–1833 against Ottoman Empire
