= Starje =

- Village
- Location within Albania
- Coordinates: 40°21′29″N 20°43′5″E
- Country: Albania
- County: Korçë
- Municipality: Kolonjë
- Administrative unit: Qendër Ersekë

Population
  - Total: 300
- Time zone: UTC+1 (CET)
  - Summer (DST): UTC+2 (CEST)

Starje is a village in the Korçë County in southeastern Albania. At the 2015 local government reform it became part of the municipality Kolonjë. Originally the name was Plakas meaning old person in Albanian. The village's population religiously belongs to the Bektashi order while there are also some Orthodox Christians.

It is situated at the foot of the Gramos mountains, about 2 km northeast of Ersekë, and is within walking distance to Albanian-Greek border. The highest peak of Gramos mountain Çuka e Peçit 2,523 m (8,278 ft) is located not far from the village. The alpine Lake Gistova is located at an altitude of 2,375 m, on the Albanian-Greek border.
The village is located close to the Llazishta forest, which is known as a holy forest for the Bektashi faith believers of the region.
Osum, one of the largest rivers of Albania starts here. Osum flows into the Adriatic Sea.

== Notable people ==
- Xhafer Ypi, former Prime Minister of Albania
- Petrit Dume, member of the Politburo of the Party of Labour of Albania
- Hasan Zyko Kamberi, one of the most famous Albanian poets of eighteenth century.
- Shahin Kolonja, publisher of Drita magazine in Bucharest, and member of the commission for the Albanian alphabet in the Congress of Monastir which decided the Albanian alphabet in 1908.
- Sali Njazi Dede, born in 1876 in Starje leader of World Bektashi Order Bektashism based in Haji Bektash Turkey, reelected when World Headquarters of Bektashi Order moved to Tirana Albania in 1929.
- Haki Laho, born in Starje, a doctor in the United States.
- Ali Laho, born in Starje. Mayor of Ersekë from year 2011 to 2015 (PS).
