= Durbalı Sultan Tekke =

Albanian Bektashi monastery in Farsala, Greece

Durbalı Tekke
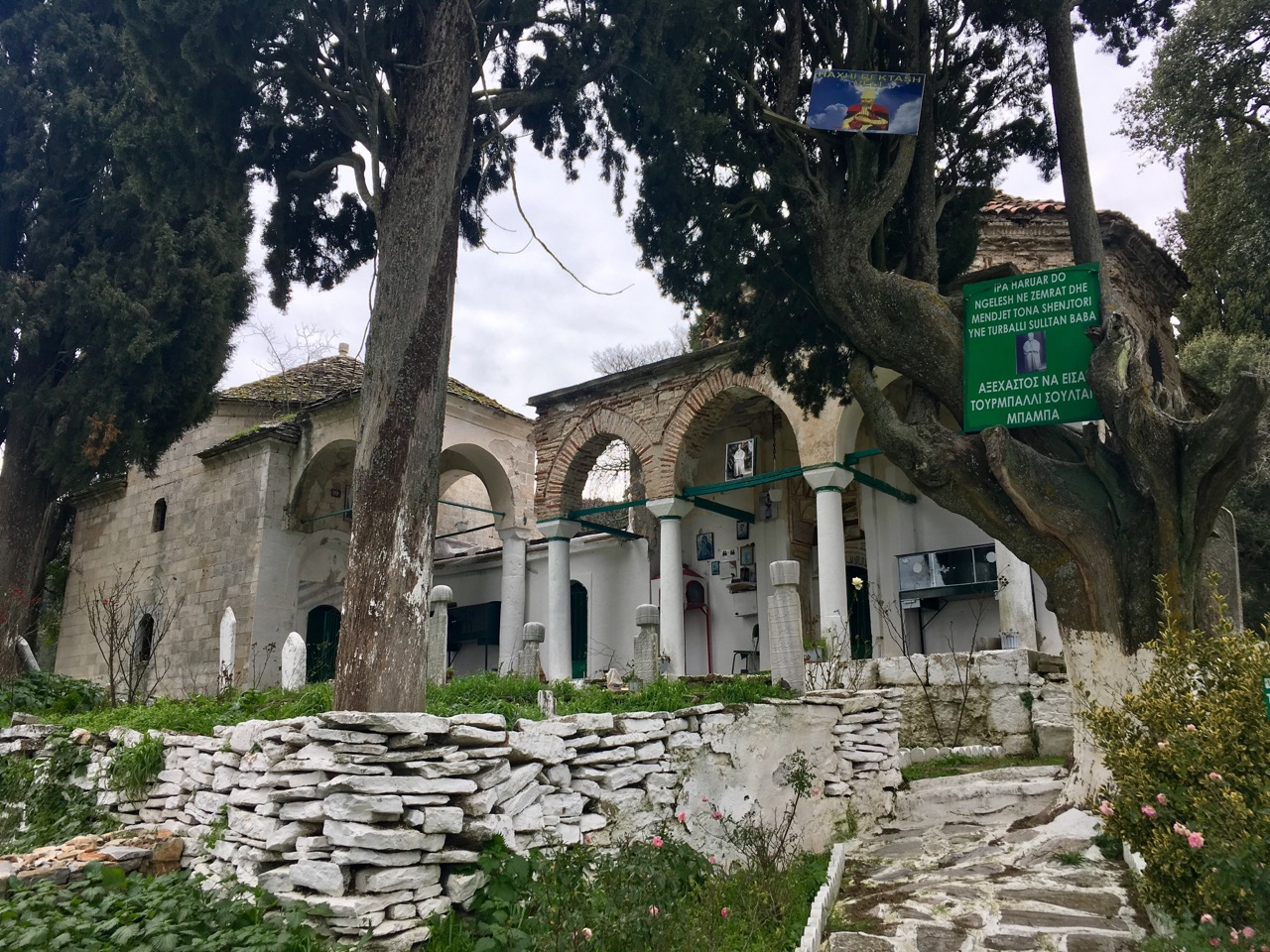
- The türbe complex in 2018

- Location within Greece

Religion
- Affiliation: Islam
- Region: Thessaly
- Rite: Mevlevi order Bektashi order
- Year consecrated: c. 1492 or late 18th century

Location
- Municipality: Farsala
- Country: Greece
- Interactive map of Durbalı Tekke
- Coordinates: 39°18′31.25″N 22°38′48.14″E

Architecture
- Style: Ottoman architecture

The Durbalı Sultan Tekke (Greek: Τεκές Ντουρμπαλή Σουλτάν), also known as Tekke of Asprogeia (Τεκές των Ασπρογείων) or Ireni Tekke, was an Bektashi tekke (a house for the gathering of dervishes) from 1492 located in the village of Ano Asprogeia, now in the Farsala municipality in Thessaly, Greece. It has images of Imam Ali and Haji Bektash Veli in it.

== History ==
According to tradition, its eponymous founder was the Alevi dervish Durbalı. Hailing from Konya in central Anatolia, he reportedly arrived at Ireni, as Asprogeia was known under Ottoman rule, in c. 1492. As a reward for his military service, including in the pacification and Islamization of Thessaly, the local Ottoman authorities granted him the license to build a tekke. As is frequent with tekkes, it was built on the ruins of a 10th-century Byzantine monastery dedicated to St. George. A fresco depicting St. George, who like many Christian saints was also venerated by the Sufis, survives on the walls of the tekke.

Some modern scholars, such as the archaeologist N. Giannopoulos, believe that Durbalı Sultan was a legendary figure, and that its Ottoman name Durbalı Tekke derived rather from a corruption of türbe, "tomb, mausoleum", with its name thus meaning "Tekke of the Tombs". Indeed, from the architectural features of the complex and the dates on the surviving tombs, it has been suggested that the tekke was founded in the second half of the 18th century.

The tekke quickly became wealthy and powerful, being awarded estates (chifliks) of over 32,000 stremmata in Ireni and Arduan (Eleftherochori). In about 1770 it was occupied by the Mevlevi order.

Following the annexation of Thessaly to Greece in 1881, the tekke continued to function without interruption. According to the archaeologist Frederick Hasluck, in c. 1888 there were 55 dervishes living in the tekke, while in 1892, the Greek novelist Andreas Karkavitsas visited the shrine and wrote about his experiences there in the Estia newspaper. In 1925, following the abolition of the Sufi orders in Turkey by Mustafa Kemal, the tekke was taken over by the Albanian Bektashis, who remained there until 1973, when the 33rd and last abbot (baba) died. In 1925, many Albanians who were hostile to the Albanian King Ahmet Zogu, who had persecuted them, found refuge in the tekke on behalf of the Greek state. In the mid-1930s, the tekke was inhabited by 6 elderly Albanian dervishes under their leader Kiaxem Baba. The dervishes were known to be very hospitable. Outside the courtyard of the tekke there was a small mosque, called the "Temple of Durbalos".

In Albania, past connections between Leskovik and the tekke existed and it was a place where certain historical notables from the town such as Kani Pasha are buried. The memory of the tekke persisted through ballads and song in the town during Albanian communism. In 2000, some Bektashi Muslims from Leskovik who lived in Greece began restoration works on the Durbalı Sultan Tekke.

== Description ==
The tekke is located on a spur of the nearby mountains, with a good view over the Thessalian plain. As was usual for both Christian and Muslim monasteries, it is surrounded by a wall for safety, reinforced with towers and crenelations. A water spring is at the entrance of the complex, which comprises two large and distinct areas, in turn surrounded by walls: the cemetery in the south, and the residential area in the north. The residential area included stables, a kitchen, storage rooms, guest houses, and a building for the ritual purification of prospective abbots. Most of these buildings are in a ruined condition today. The cemetery comprises two türbes and 33 tombs. The western türbe is the oldest, with dimensions of 6×7×7,5 m. Its masonry is of irregular ashlar blocks surrounded by bricks, which according to some scholars dates it to the 16th century. Byzantine spolia were also used in its construction. The eastern türbe is of similar dimensions and houses three tombs. The two türbes are linked by a low modern cement structure that houses two tombs.

The tekke has been declared a protected monument. The tekke still belongs to the Bektashi order, but its de facto management is under the land office of the Larissa Prefecture, leading to disagreements and legal ambiguity over its ownership status and problems with its maintenance.
