= Tajar Tetova =

Albanian activist

Tajar (Bey) Tetova
- Born: late-19th century Kalkandelen, Ottoman Empire
- Occupations: Captain in Turkish army Freedom fighter Activist
- Known for: Guerilla against invaders in World War I Along with Sali Butka, responsible for the 1916 destruction of Moscopole.

Tajar Tetova (Turkish: Kalkandelenli Tayyar) was an Albanian military commander and çetë (band) leader in southern Albania and Macedonia.

== History ==
=== Background ===
Born in Kalkandelen (today Tetovo, North Macedonia) in the late-19th century, Tajar bey Tetova came from a noble landowning family. Tetova rose through the military ranks of the Ottoman Empire, becoming a captain in the Ottoman army.

=== Albanian National Awakening ===
In 1908 he was sent by the Ottoman Empire to support the Ottoman troops against the Albanian uprisings in Monastir (present-day Bitola). On June 22, 1908, captain Tajar Tetova working together with the Bashkimi club of Monastir, mutinied and fled into the mountains with seven officers and 150 Albanian soldiers to join southern Albanian Tosk revolutionaries. He formed a military league, demanding the retirement of the Young Turk government and general elections claiming that the existing cabinet was elected under terrorist agitation of the Young Turkish Committee. Tetova and his soldiers took all the weapons and ammunition company as well as two heavy machine guns from the Turkish in Monastir. Tetova expanded his insurgent movement in the area of Debar, Korçë and Kolonjë. Tetova's group merged with Sali Butka fighters and together fought against the invaders of Albania.

He served for a short time as mayor of Elbasan. A street in Elbasan is named after him.
