= Leskovik =

- Town
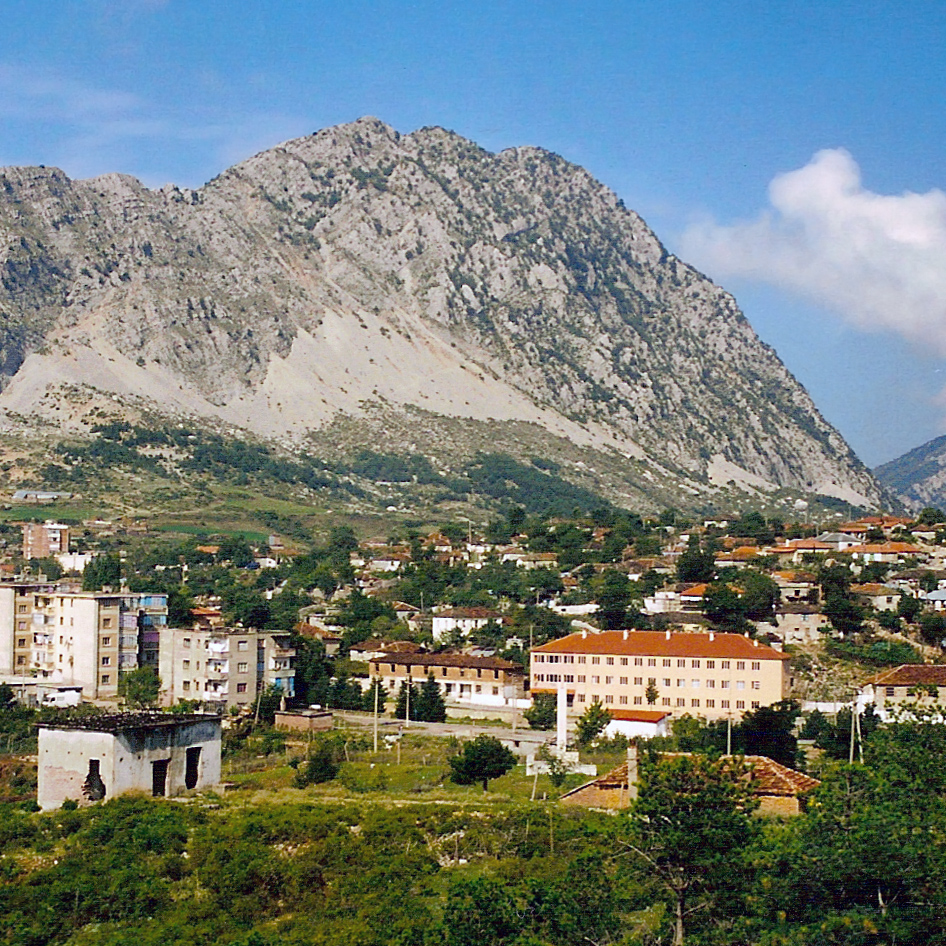
- Leskovik, with the Melesini Mountain in the background

- Location within Albania
- Coordinates: 40°9′N 20°36′E
- Country: Albania
- County: Korçë
- Municipality: Kolonjë
  - Administrative unit: 3.64 km^{2} (1.41 sq mi)
- Elevation: 913 m (2,995 ft)

Population (2023)
  - Administrative unit: 939
  - Administrative unit density: 258/km^{2} (668/sq mi)
- Time zone: UTC+1 (CET)
  - Summer (DST): UTC+2 (CEST)
- Postal Code: 7402
- Area Code: (0)871

Leskovik (Albanian: Leskoviku) is a town in Korçë County, in southeastern Albania. Historically, until 2015, it was a municipality, after which it became a municipal unit of Kolonjë. Leskovik is located 1 kilometre (0.62 mi) from Melesin mountain. The town is located close to the Greek–Albanian border. The population as of the 2023 census is 399.

== Name ==
The name comes from the Slavic word leska ("hazel" or "hazel river"), together with the suffix ik(ë). The name of the town was shown as Lexovico in an 1821 map by the French writer and traveller François Pouqueville, and as Leskovik in an Ottoman document produced in 1851.

== History ==
Leskovik was home to several feudal wealthy landowners with large estates (now located in modern Greece) and emerged as a centre of Islam in the local area. It was an important town on a main road linking to Përmet and Korçë.

A majority of town's history was shaped by the presence of the Sufi Bektashi order. Leskovik was an important centre for the Bektashi order, and it was strongly established in the surrounding area. The Sufi Halveti order and Sa'di order of dervishes was also present in the town, while the Sufi Hayatiyya order had a tekke dating from 1796. In Leskovik, a Bektashi tekke was founded in 1887 by Abedin Baba, a town native and religious figure. The tekke housed a small number of dervishes and Abedin Baba's gravesite, later destroyed by war. Another religious building was the Pazar (Bazaar) mosque of Leskovik.

Ottoman Albanian spahis and landowners from 19th century Leskovik owned estate properties (chiftlik) in parts of the Balkans and in particular the Thessalian plain, until its loss to Greece in 1881 leading to local economic decline and increasing reliance on agriculture. The Ottoman government elevated Leskovik as the administrative centre of a new short lived Sanjak of Leskovik (1882–1888) aimed at securing control of the mountainous region. Disputes over its boundaries and protests from local Christians over the choice of Leskovik, a mainly Muslim Albanian town as the district's administrative seat followed. Later the sanjak was disestablished and the kaza (subdistrict) of Leskovik was placed under the jurisdiction of the Sanjak of Ioannina.

In the late Ottoman period and on the eve of the Balkan Wars, the population of Leskovik was mostly Muslim Bektashi. A few Muslim Albanians from Leskovik were employed in the Ottoman bureaucracy as administrative officials governing some districts in parts of the empire. Late 19th century Leskovik hosted a fair, while the town gained a culinary reputation among locals and abroad for its sausages and sweet baked goods. An Ottoman secondary school (rüştiye) functioned in Leskovik. Greek education was present in Leskovik at the 1898–1899 school year with one boys' and one girls' school and a total of 100 pupils attending them.

=== 20th century ===
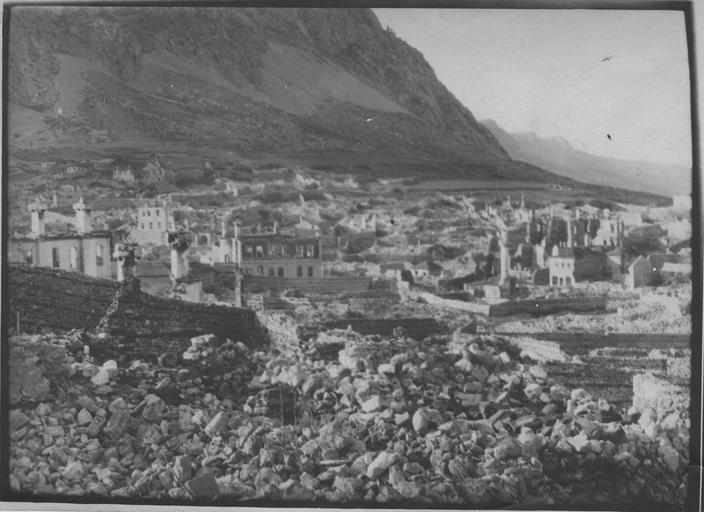
Leskovik in ruins, 1916

During the Balkan Wars (1912–1913), Leskovik came under the control of Greek forces who destroyed the town. Shortly after the town was visited by an international commission who was responsible to draw the precise borders between the Kingdom of Greece and the newly established Principality of Albania. There was some difficulty in drawing the new border by the international demarcation border commission as the area around Leskovik and nearby Konitsa contained mixed populations of Albanians and Greeks. After the partition of Leskovik kaza (1913) along demographic lines, its Greek settlements went to Greece and its Albanian settlements became part of Albania, with Leskovik itself placed in the Albanian province of Kolonjë.

Leskovik was finally ceded to Albania under the terms of the Protocol of Florence (17 December 1913). In March, 5 [O.S. February, 20] 1914 the town officially joined the Autonomous Republic of Northern Epirus.

During World War I in the summer of 1916 the town was occupied by Italian troops due to the pretext that the Greek forces could not resist the advance of the Bulgarian army in the Balkan front.

==== World War II ====
At 21 November 1940, during the Greco–Italian War, units of the II Army Corps of the advancing Greek forces entered Leskovik after breaching the Italian defences. The Greek positions, including Leskovik, were abandoned after Albania was invaded by Germany in April 1941.

The Battle of Leskovik was fought in May 1943 by Albanian partisans from the Korçë area who killed 200 Italian troops and destroyed 12 armoured cars and trucks.

==== Cold War ====
The People's Socialist Republic of Albania, being an ally of the Soviet Union, was involved in the Greek Civil War (1946–1949) by supporting the communist led Greek Democratic Army. Leskovik became for a period its headquarters. The town also hosted a training, a supply center, as well as medical facilities for the communist guerrillas, who mounted several invasions from Albanian soil into the Greek region of Grammos and fled back to Albania once an operation was completed.

==== Modern period ====
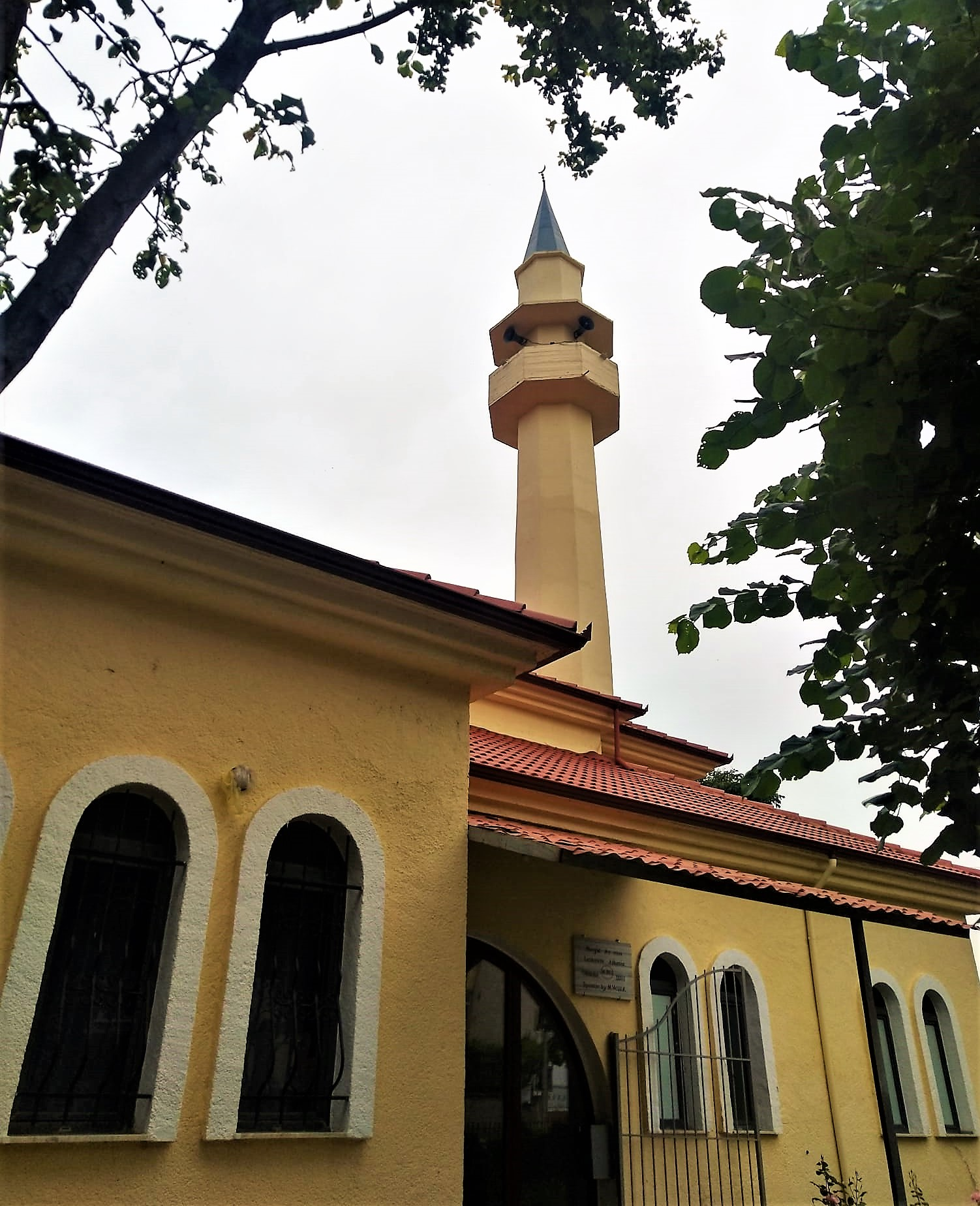
The town mosque

In the wider area of the Kolonjë district, the religious composition is distributed between Islam and Orthodox Christianity. Previously populated mainly by Muslims who belonged either to the Bektashi or Halveti Sufi orders, in the modern period the town population of Leskovik is religiously mixed, composed of Muslims and Orthodox Christians. Romani live in Leskovik and Aromanians reside in mixed neighbourhoods of the town.

Local Orthodox Christians (Aromanians and others) view the Albanian Muslim Bektashi population of Leskovik as newcomers from the north. The Bektashis are often regarded by the town's Christian population as more similar to them than to other Muslims. Some Sufi Muslims from Leskovik participate in the organisation of regional Sufi festivals in the villages of Gjonç and in particular Glinë, attended by local Muslims from the town and wider area including many Christians.

Increased migration into Greece has also led to a growth of some converts to Orthodox Christianity to better integrate in their new place of residence. In 2000, some Bektashi Muslims from Leskovik who lived in Greece began restoration works on the Durbalı Sultan Tekke in Thessaly, a monument with past historical links to the town, mentioned in local ballads and songs and a place where certain town notables are buried. In 2011, the Albanian census recorded the town of Leskovik had 416 inhabitants

== Notable people ==
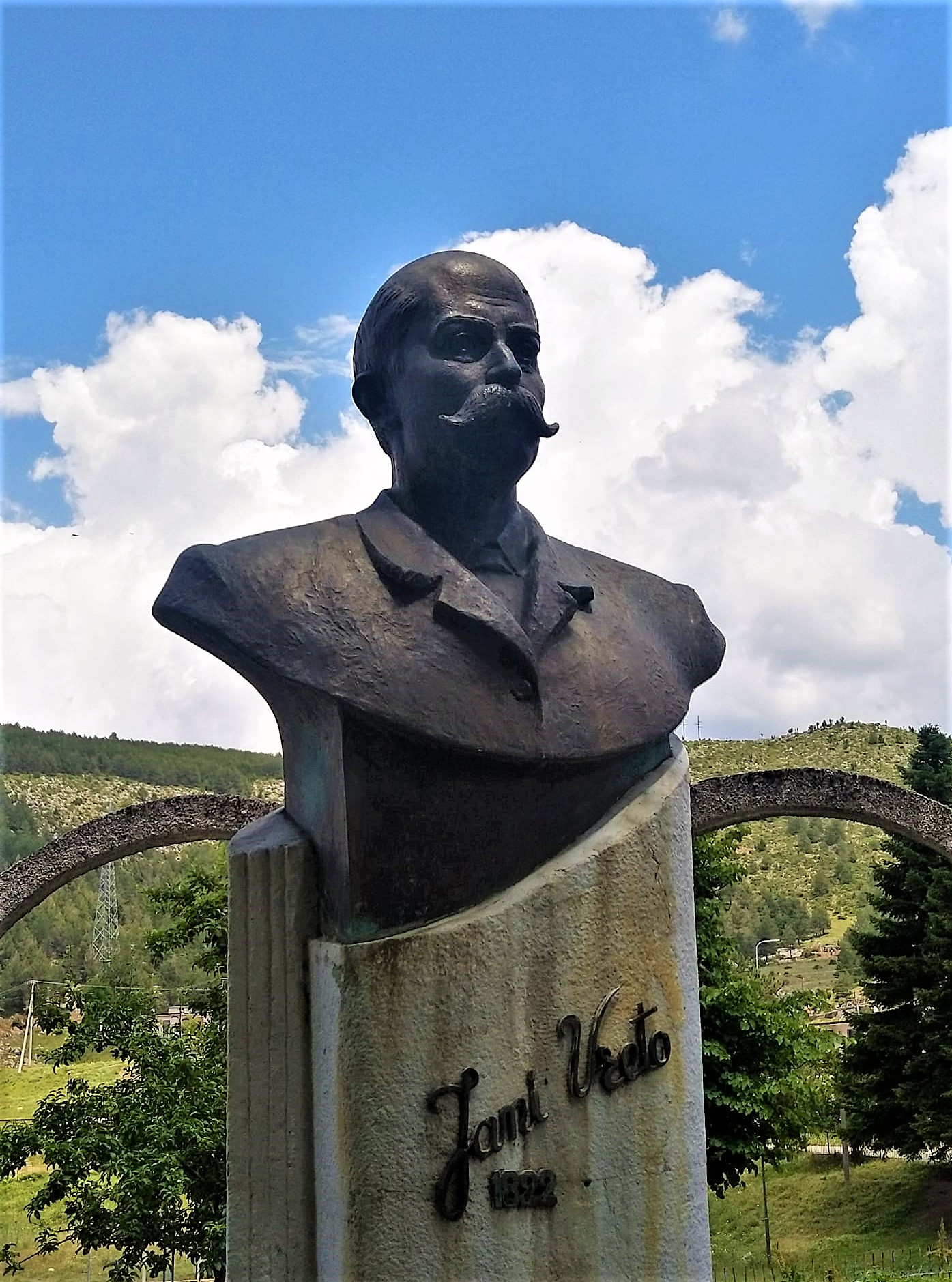
The statue of Jani Vreto in Leskovik

- Jani Vreto (1822–1900), Albanian rilindas and a founding member of the Central Committee for the Defence of the Rights of the Albanian People, was born in the village of Postenan, near Leskovik.
- Abedin Baba of Leskoviku (born before 1867 – 1912) – Bektashi religious figure and poet.
- Hafize Leskoviku (born c. 1870), singer and instrumental musician
- Nezir Leskoviku (1876 – c. 1970), diplomat and Ottoman administrator
- Mustafa Qulli, better known as Muço Qulli (1887–1915), Albanian patriot, publicist, publisher of the Shkodër-based newspaper Populli
- Ajdin Asllan (1895–1976), musician, record label owner, Vatra activist, composer of Vatra's hymn;
- Naim Frashëri, actor, (1923–1975), born in Leskovik.
- Asllan Rusi (1944–1983), volleyball player, the main volleyball arena in Tirana bears his name

== Sources ==
- Ayverdi, Ekrem Hakkı (1978). Avrupaʾda Osmanlı mimârî eserleri: Bulgaristan, Yunanistan, Arnavudluk [Ottoman architectural works in Europe: Bulgaria, Greece, Albania] (in Turkish). Vol. 4. İstanbul Fetih Cemiyeti. ISBN 9789757618355.
- Bachis, Francesco; Pusceddu, Antonio Maria (2013). "Mobilities, Boundaries, Religions: Performing Comparison in the Mediterranean". Journal of Mediterranean Studies. 22 (2).
- Barina, Z.; Pifkó, D.; Pintér, B.; Bräuchler, C. (2010). "News from the early spring flora of Albania". Acta Botanica Hungarica. 52 (3–4): 239–245. doi:10.1556/ABot.52.2010.3-4.3.
- Clayer, Nathalie (1990). L'Albanie, pays des derviches: Les ordres mystiques musulmans en Albanie à l'époque post-ottomane (1912–1967) (in French). Harrassowitz. ISBN 978-34470-3-088-5.
- Clayer, Nathalie (2005). "Appendix: Biographies of Albanian students of the Mekteb-i Mülkiye". In Özdalga, Elisabeth (ed.). Late Ottoman Society: The Intellectual Legacy. Routledge. ISBN 978-04153-4-164-6.
- Clayer, Nathalie (2007). Aux origines du nationalisme albanais: La naissance d'une nation majoritairement musulmane en Europe [The origins of Albanian nationalism: The birth of a predominantly Muslim nation in Europe] (in French). Paris: Karthala. ISBN 978-28458-6-816-8.
- Elsie, Robert (1994). "Hydronymica Albanica: A survey of river names in Albania" (PDF). Zeitschrift für Balkanologie. 30 (1). University of Jena, Germany: 1–46. ISSN 0044-2356. Archived from the original (PDF) on 22 March 2016.
- Elsie, Robert (2010). Historical Dictionary of Albania (2nd ed.). Plymouth, UK: Scarecrow Press, Inc. ISBN 978-08108-7-380-3.
- Elsie, Robert (2001). A Dictionary of Albanian Religion, Mythology and Folk Culture. London: Hurst & Company. ISBN 1-85065-570-7.
- Elsie, Robert (2019). The Albanian Bektashi: History and Culture of a Dervish Order in the Balkans. London: Bloomsbury Publishing. ISBN 978-17883-1-571-5.
- Fischer, Bernd Jürgen (1999). Albania at War, 1939–1945. West Lafayette: Purdue University Press. ISBN 9781557531414.
- Hartmann, Elke (2016). Die Reichweite des Staates: Wehrpflicht und moderne Staatlichkeit im Osmanischen Reich 1869-1910. Krieg in der Geschichte (in German). Paderborn, Germany: Ferdinand Schöningh. ISBN 978-36577-8-373-1.
- Hasluck, F. W. (1916). "Geographical Distribution of the Bektashi". The Annual of the British School at Athens. 21: 84–124. doi:10.1017/S0068245400009631. JSTOR 30102759. S2CID 180796755.
- Kaphetzopoulos, Ioannis; Flokas, Charalambos; Dima-Dimitriou, Angeliki (2000). The Struggle for Northern Epirus. Hellenic Army General Staff, Army History Directorate. ISBN 978-960-7897-40-4.
- Kitsaki, Georgia (2011). "Ethnic groups: Identities and relationships in the Greek–Albanian border". In Nitsiakos, Vasilēs (ed.). Balkan Border Crossings: Second Annual of the Konitsa Summer School. Berlin: Lit Verlag. ISBN 978-3-643-80092-3.
- Kiel, Machiel (1990). Ottoman Architecture in Albania, 1385-1912. Islamic art series. Vol. 5. Research Centre for Islamic History, Art and Culture. ISBN 9290633301.
- Kiel, Machiel (2009). "Durbali Sultan Revisited". Türk Kültürü ve Hacı Bektaş Velî Araştırma Dergisi [Turkish Culture and Hacı Bektas Veli Research Quarterly] (52): 53–58.
- Kokolakis, Mihalis (2003). Το ύστερο Γιαννιώτικο Πασαλίκι: χώρος, διοίκηση και πληθυσμός στην τουρκοκρατούμενη Ηπειρο (1820–1913) [The Late Pashalik of Ioannina: Space, Administration and Population in Ottoman-ruled Epirus (1820–1913)] (in Greek). Athens, Greece: EIE-ΚΝΕ. ISBN 978-960-7916-11-2.
- Matanie, ivor (1994). World War II. Godalming, UK: CLB Publishing. ISBN 978-18583-3-182-9.
- Nitsiakos, Basilēs G.; Nitsiakos, Vassilis (2010). On the Border: Transborder Mobility, Ethnic Groups and Boundaries Along the Albanian-Greek Frontier. Münster, Germany: LIT Verlag. ISBN 978-36431-0-793-0.
- Norris, Harry Thirlwall (1993). Islam in the Balkans: Religion and Society between Europe and the Arab World. University of South Carolina Press. ISBN 978-0-87249-977-5.
- Nuro, Kujtim (2019). "Şemsettin Sami'nin Kamusu'l-a'lam'ında Arnavutluk Şehirleri" [Albanian Cities in Sami Frasheri's Encyclopedia "Kamusu'l-a'lam"]. Osmanlı Mirası Araştırmaları Dergisi [Journal of Ottoman Legacy Studies]. 6 (15).
- Pusceddu, Antonio Maria (2018). "Dealing with boundaries: Muslim pilgrimages and political economy on the Southern Albanian frontier". In Flaskerud, Ingvild; Natvig, Richard J. (eds.). Muslim Pilgrimage in Europe (PDF). Routledge. ISBN 978-1-317-09108-0. Archived from the original (PDF) on 14 July 2020.
- Shrader, Charles R. (1999). The Withered Vine: Logistics and the Communist Insurgency in Greece, 1945–1949 ([Online-Ausg.] ed.). Westport, Connecticut: Praeger. ISBN 978-0-275-96544-0.
- Stickney, Edith Pierpont (1926). Southern Albania or Northern Epirus in European International Affairs, 1912–1923. Stanford University Press. ISBN 978-0-8047-6171-0.
- Winnifrith, Tom (2002). Badlands-borderlands: A History of Northern Epirus/Southern Albania. London: Duckworth. ISBN 978-0-7156-3201-7.
