= Hasan Biçaku =

Albanian politician

Hasan Bicaku was an Albanian politician and mayor of Elbasan from 1933 to 1934.
