= Ahmed Dakli =

Albanian politician

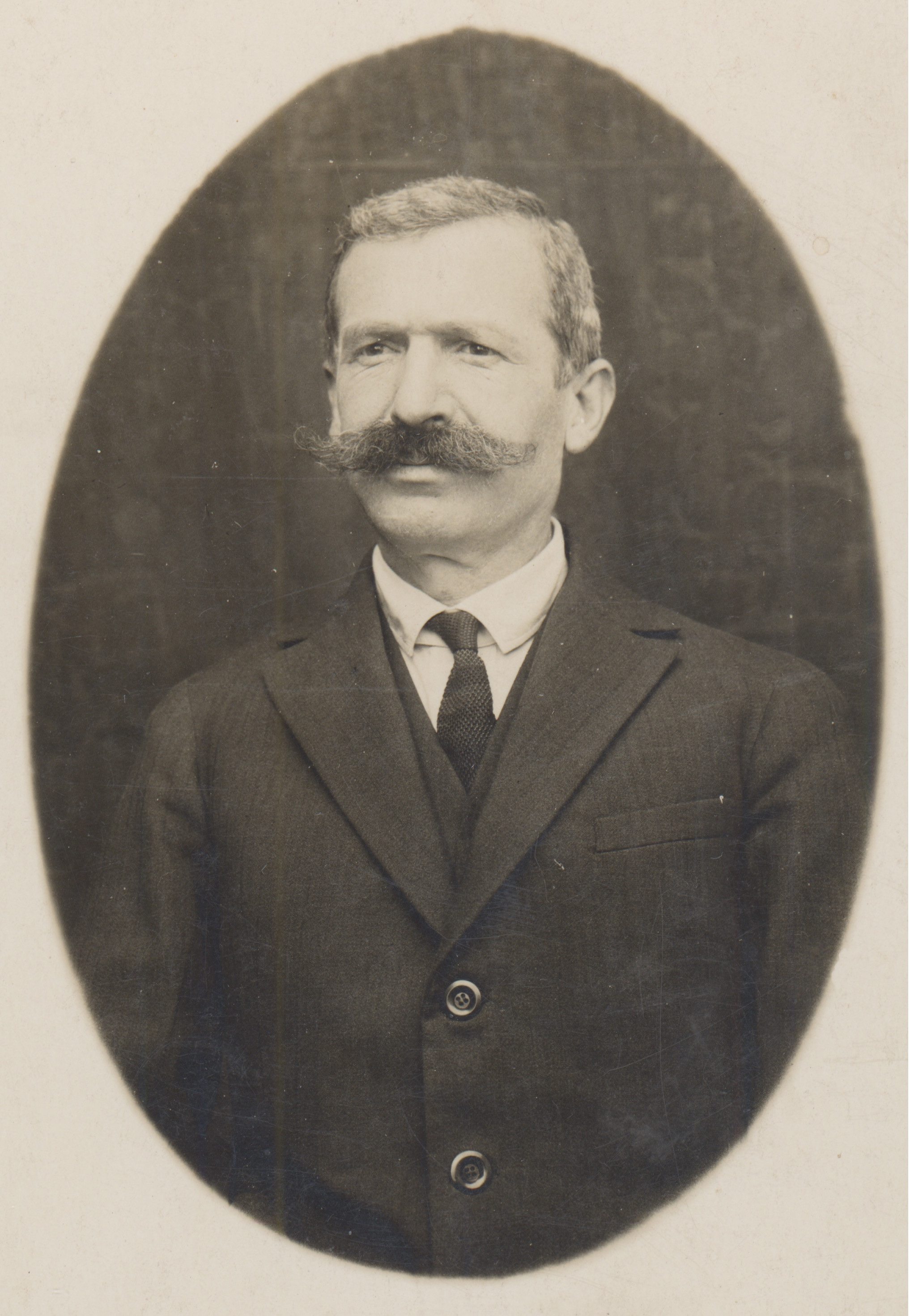

Ahmed Dakli was an Albanian politician and mayor of Elbasan from 1937 to 1939.
