= Radimisht =

- Village
- Typical stone house in Radimisht

- Location within Albania
- Coordinates: 40°15′43″N 20°34′06″E
- Country: Albania
- County: Korçë
- Municipality: Kolonjë
- Administrative unit: Barmash
- Elevation: 760 m (2,490 ft)
- Time zone: UTC+1 (CET)
  - Summer (DST): UTC+2 (CEST)

Radimisht is a small village in Korçë County, southeastern Albania, with approximately three houses currently populated. It is part of the former municipality Barmash. At the 2015 local government reform it became part of the municipality Kolonjë. Inside the village, there are several houses and the remains of an old church. The village was created after the Ottoman invasion of southern Albania, as Christian Albanian villagers moved north to escape persecution. Radimisht is 8 miles (13 km) from the Greek border and about 40 miles (64 km) from the Albanian coast (direct line). There are no paved roads to the village, and it can only be reached by animal rides (donkey, horse) or off-road vehicles.
