= Fuad Biçaku =

Albanian politician

Fuad Bicaku was an Albanian politician and mayor of Elbasan between 1913 and 1915.
