= Ekrem Bardha =

Albanian businessman (born 1933)

- Born: 13 May 1933 (age 93); Radanj, Kolonjë District, Albania
- Occupation: Businessman
- Known for: Co-founder of the National Albanian American Council; Owner of McDonald's franchises in the Detroit area
- Title: Honorary Consul of Albania in Michigan

Ekrem Bardha (born 13 May 1933) is an Albanian American businessman, co-founder of the National Albanian American Council (NAAC), and former owner of Illyria Newspaper. He is currently serving as Albania's Honorary Consul in Michigan.

== Early life ==
Bardha was born in the southern village of Radanj in Kolonjë District, Albania. Having escaped from the Albanian communist regime in 1953, after one of his brothers was jailed for political reasons, he settled in the Detroit area and went into the restaurant business.

== Career ==
Bardha became the owner of 18 McDonald's fast-food franchises, which grossed over $25 million a year.

He is the author of 2 books: Far Yet Near Albania, and The Albanian-American Diaspora and the Independence of Kosova, 2023.
