= Zylyftar Poda =

Albanian leader of early 1800s

Zylyftar Poda (born Iljaz Poda, fl. 1768–1835) was an Albanian leader, who led several revolts against the Ottoman Empire.

== Life ==
Zylyftar Poda was born in 1768 in Podë, a village in the region of Kolonjë, south Albania (then Ottoman Empire). He became known during his service for Ali Pasha of Ioannina, a semi-independent ruler in Epirus. In January 1821, Poda was among the leaders of a group of Muslim Tosks who joined forces with 1,500 Souliotes to help Ali in his efforts against the Ottomans. On 27 January they agreed with the Souliot captains Markos Botsaris, Notis Botsaris, Kitsos Tzavelas for a common struggle to save Ali, as brothers in arms "in soul and body". Their attack helped to temporarily repel the Ottoman troops. On 1 September 1821, Poda was among the signatories of the "Greek-Albanian alliance" at Peta, near Arta. Written in Greek, the text was signed by eight Muslim Tosks, eight Souliotes and eight Greek kapetanioi. Its goal was military support for Ali, under the guarantee of besa, an Albanian traditional pledge. After Ali Pasha' death and the eventual destruction of his pashalik, Poda started to take part in revolts against the Ottoman Empire. He took part in a meeting of Albanian leaders in 1828 in Berat. There Poda was one of the three main participants, the others being Ismail Kemal and Shahin bej Delvina. The meeting concluded with requests for Albanian officials in the areas with Albanian population and the removal of Reşid Mehmed Pasha, a local official with considerable power in parts of Epirus, from his official posts in Delvina, Vlora and Ioannina. Two years later Reşid invited a number of Albanian leaders to a meeting in Bitola. Poda decided to not attend, which turned out to be the right decision, as the attendees were massacred. In 1831 Poda led a peasant revolt in the region of Kolonjë and Leskovik, coordinating with other Albanian leaders such as the Bushati family. In 1835 Poda was executed by Ottoman authorities due to his activities for more rights for Albanians.

== Legacy ==
Zylyftar Poda is considered one of the most important Albanian leaders of the early 1800s, and many folk songs have been dedicated to him.
