= Gorë =

- Administrative unit
- Location within Albania
- Coordinates: 40°46′N 20°33′E
- Country: Albania
- County: Korçë
- Municipality: Maliq

Population (2011)
  - Administrative unit: 1,565
- Time zone: UTC+1 (CET)
  - Summer (DST): UTC+2 (CEST)
- Area Code: (0)865

Gorë is a former municipality in the Korçë County, southeastern Albania. At the 2015 local government reform it became a subdivision of the municipality Maliq. The population at the 2011 census was 1,565. The municipal unit consists of the villages Zvarisht, Dolan, Lozhan, Lozhan i Ri, Senishtë, Tresovë, Strelcë, Shalës, Selcë, Velçan, Mesmal, Moçan, Mjaltas, Marjan, Desmirë, Qënckë, Babjen and Dolanec.

== Notable people ==
- Kajo Babjeni (1833–1923) was an Albanian kachak, revolutionary and activist of the Albanian National Awakening from the Gorë region of south-eastern Albania. He was known as Kapedani i Gorës and led an armed band in the Gorë region.
- Kristo Shuli
- Servet Teufik Agaj, former Albanian football player for Skenderbeu.
