= Blush, Albania =

Blush
- Village
- Location within Albania
- Coordinates: 40°24′3″N 20°36′35″E
- Country: Albania
- County: Korçë
- Municipality: Kolonjë
- Administrative unit: Mollas
- Time zone: UTC+1 (CET)
  - Summer (DST): UTC+2 (CEST)

Blush is a village in the Korçë County, southeastern Albania. At the 2015 local government reform it became part of the municipality Kolonjë.
