= Jani Vreto =

Albanian writer (1822–1900)

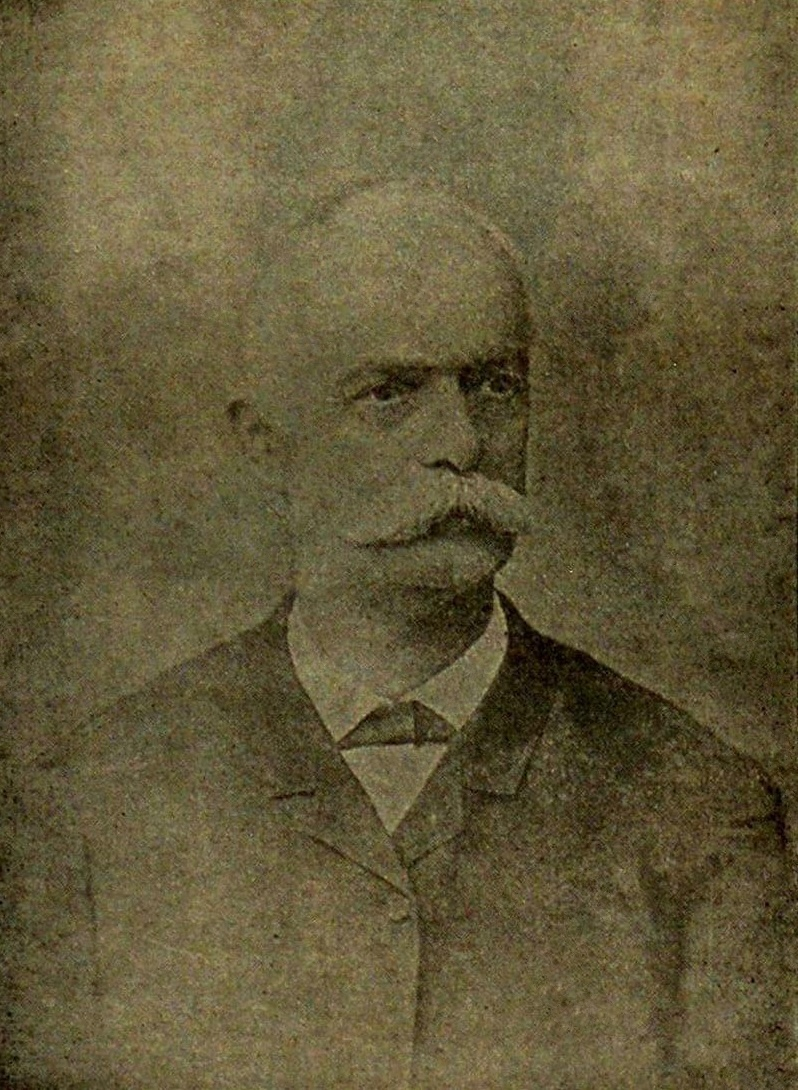
- Vreto, 1880s
- Born: 14 January 1822; Postenan, Korçë, Albania (then Ottoman Empire)
- Died: 9 July 1900 (aged 78); Athens, Greece
- Occupations: writer, printer, publisher
- Writing career
- Notable works: Histori e Skënderbeut, Apologia etc
- Literary movement: Albanian National Awakening

Jani Vreto (14 January 1822 – 9 July 1900) was an Albanian writer, printer, publisher and important figure of the Albanian National Awakening. He was responsible for setting up and overseeing the work of the first Albanian printing house in Bucharest in 1886.

== Life ==
Jani Vreto was born in Postenan, a village near Leskovik, southern Albania on 14 January 1822. He went to the local school where he took his first lessons from Nikolla Ikonomi, who would teach him both Greek and Albanian.

Some years before the establishment of the League of Prizren during the Great Eastern Crisis, Vreto met with six other Albanian intellectuals regarding the alphabet question and he supported the use of the Greek alphabet to write Albanian due to the Pelasgian theory. Vreto became a member of the Central Committee for Defending Albanian Rights (founded 1877) which was a group of Albanian intelligentsia based in Istanbul advocating for the territorial integrity and unity of Albanian inhabited areas in the Ottoman Empire. The Committee for Defending Albanian Rights appointed Vreto along with Sami Frashëri, Vaso Pasha and Hasan Tahsini to create an Albanian alphabet. During discussions about the Albanian alphabet Frashëri and Vreto wanted the inclusion of a Greek alphabet character on the premise that Albanians and Greeks have the same ancestors, the Pelasgians. By 19 March 1879 the group approved Frashëri's 36 letter alphabet consisting mostly of Latin characters. In 1878, he represented the Albanian population of the Ottoman Empire alongside Abdyl Frashëri at the Congress of Berlin.

In 1879 he became one of the founders of Society for the Publication of Albanian Letters, (Albanian: Shoqëri e të shtypurit shkronjavet shqip), an organization responsible for publishing Albanian textbooks and opening Albanian schools. Vreto transferred its headquarters from Istanbul to Bucharest after the organization was banned by the Ottoman authorities. As a member of this society Vreto set up and operated the Albanian printing house of Bucharest playing an important role in the advancement of the Albanian movement.

At the same time he was excommunicated by the Orthodox metropolitan of Gjirokastër, who accused him of having committed heresy by "creating an Albanian question". Many of the works of Naim Frashëri, national poet of Albania were published by this organization. In 1882, Vreto left Bucharest for Egypt to develop nationalist content among the Albanian diaspora.

== Works ==
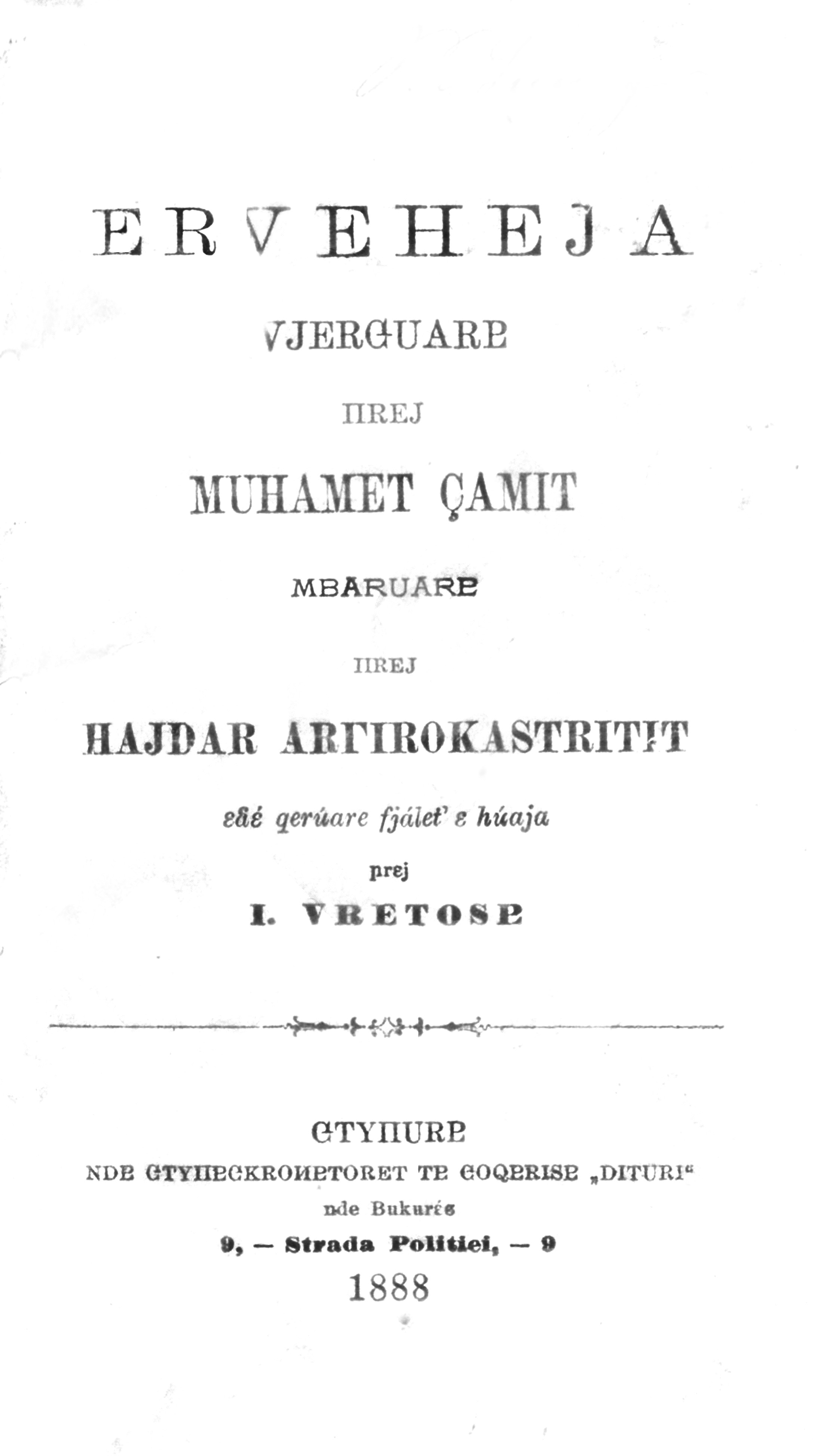
Title page of Erveheja 1888 using Sami Frashëri’s alphabet.

Jani Vreto's most known work is an epic poem titled Histori e Skënderbeut (English: History of Skanderbeg), dedicated to national hero of Albania Skanderbeg. In 1888 he edited and published the poem Erveheja of Muhamet Kyçyku transliterating it into Latin script completely removing all Turkish or Arabic words Kyçyku had used. Part of Vreto's own work was published in Spiro Dine's work Valët e Detit (English: Waves at the Sea), a collection of Albanian history and literature.

== Recognition ==
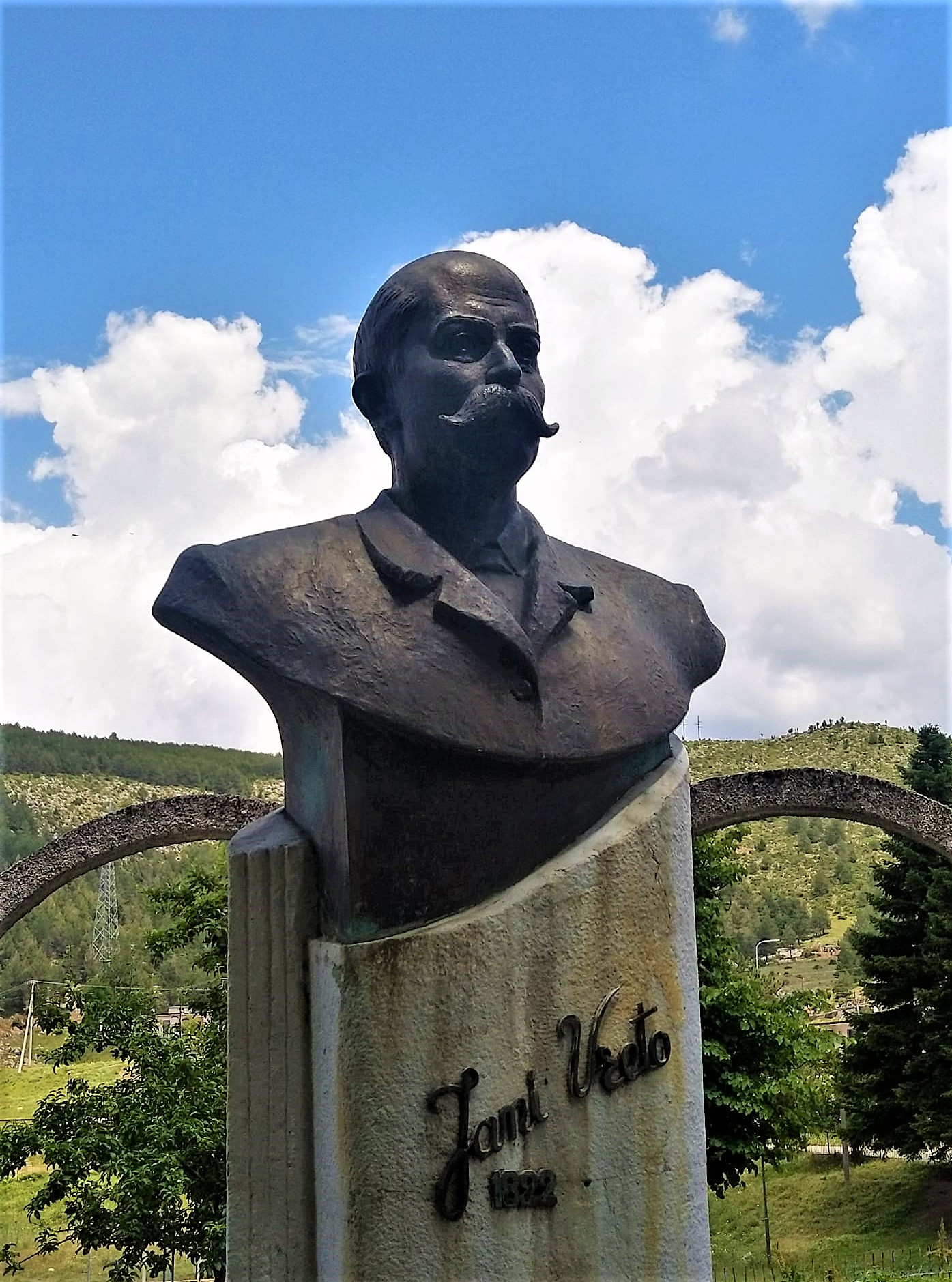
Jani Vreto's statue in Leskovik

On 13 January 2012 the President of Albania, Bamir Topi decorate Jani Vreto after death Honor of Nation Order of Albania.

There is a statue of him in the town of Leskovik.

== See also ==
- Society for the Publication of Albanian Writings
- Kristo Luarasi
- Sami Frashëri
