= Butkë =

- Village
- Location within Albania
- Coordinates: 40°25′55″N 20°43′25″E
- Country: Albania
- County: Korçë
- Municipality: Kolonjë
- Administrative unit: Mollas
- Time zone: UTC+1 (CET)
  - Summer (DST): UTC+2 (CEST)

Butkë is a community in the Korçë County, Albania. At the 2015 local government reform it became part of the municipality Kolonjë.

== Notable people ==
- Sali Butka, 19th and early 20th century freedom fighter
- Safet Butka, World War II freedom fighter
- Qemal Butka, mayor of Tirana
