= Rustem Ymeri =

Albanian politician and mayor

Rustem Ymeri was an Albanian politician and mayor of Elbasan from 1929 through 1930.
