= Barmash =

- Administrative unit
- Location within Albania
- Coordinates: 40°17′N 20°37′E
- Country: Albania
- County: Korçë
- Municipality: Kolonjë
- Elevation: 879 m (2,884 ft)

Population (2023)
  - Total: 246
- Time zone: UTC+1 (CET)
  - Summer (DST): UTC+2 (CEST)
- Postal Code: 7404
- Area Code: (0)871

Barmash is a village and a former municipality in the Korçë County, southeastern Albania. At the 2015 local government reform it became a subdivision of the municipality Kolonjë. The population at the 2011 census was 480. The municipal unit consists of the villages Barmash, Leshnjë, Shalës, Gozhdorazhd, Sanjollas, Kamnik, Bënjëz, Radimisht, Arrëz and Rajan.

== Notable people ==
- Ylli Rakipi

== See also ==
- Barmash incident (1943)
