= Kolonjë =

Albanian administrative area

- Municipality
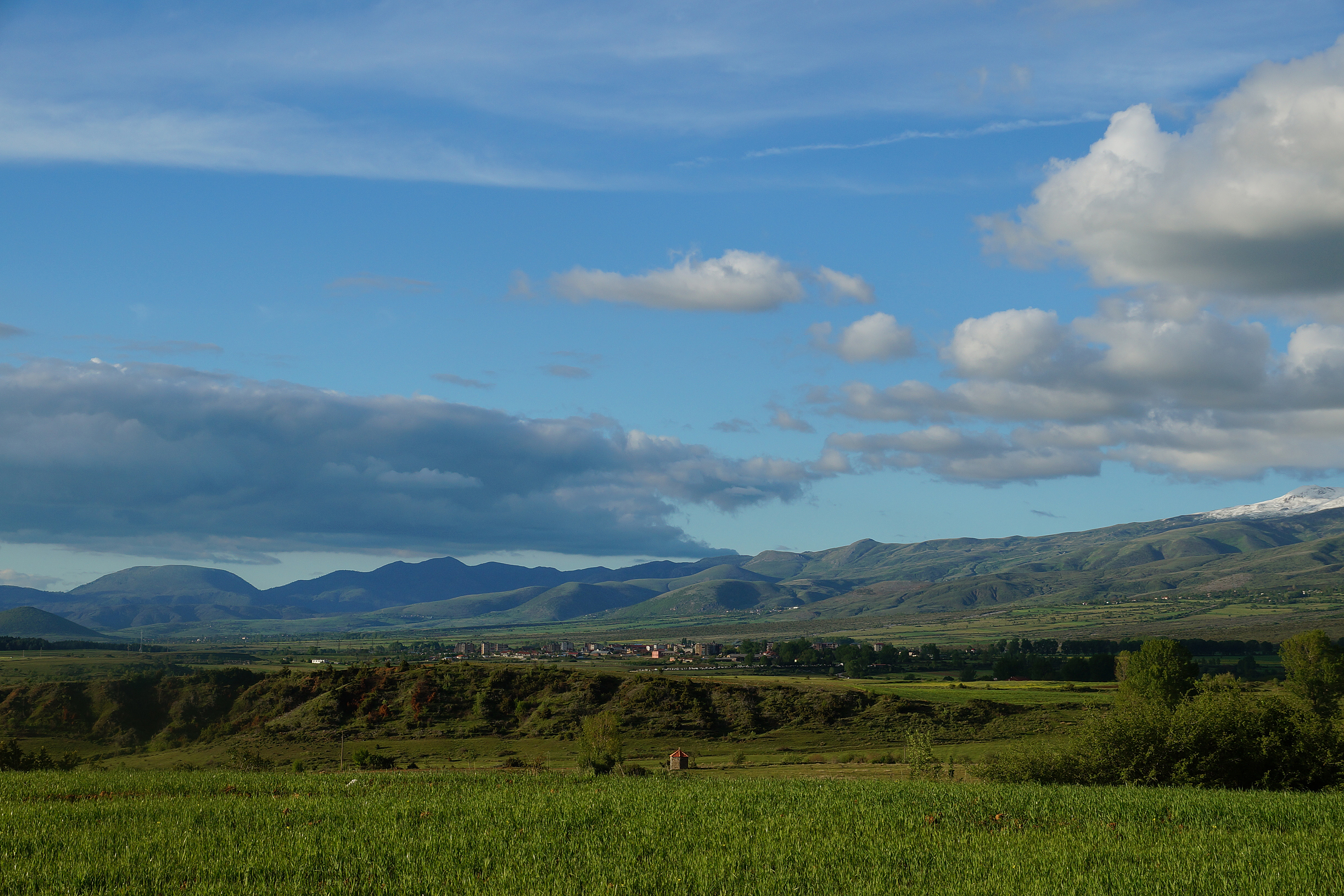
- Landscape at Ersekë

- Emblem

- Location within Albania
- Coordinates: 40°18′N 20°38′E
- Country: Albania
- County: Korçë

Government
  - Mayor: Erion Isai (PS)

Area
  - Municipality: 865 km^{2} (334 sq mi)

Population (2011)
  - Municipality: 11,070
  - Municipality density: 12.8/km^{2} (33.1/sq mi)
- Demonym(s): Albanian: Kolonjar (m), Kolonjare (f)
- Time zone: UTC+1 (CET)
  - Summer (DST): UTC+2 (CEST)
- Postal Code: 7401
- Area Code: (0)812
- Website: www.kolonja.gov.al

Kolonjë is a municipality in Korçë County, southeastern Albania. It was created in 2015 by the merger of the former municipalities Barmash, Çlirim, Ersekë, Leskovik, Mollas, Novoselë, Qendër Ersekë and Qendër Leskovik. The seat of the municipality is the town Ersekë. The total population is 11,070 (2011 census), in a total area of 865 km^{2} (334 sq mi). It is an ethnographic region.

The area of the municipality is coextensive with the former Kolonjë District, one of the 36 districts of Albania, which were dissolved in July 2000 and replaced by 12 counties.

== Location ==
Kolonjë is located in south-east Albania and its capital is Ersekë. Other towns in this district include Leskovik to the south. It is bounded by Korçë to the north and Greece to the east, including the regional units of Kastoria and Ioannina. The town of Ersekë is located at the foot of Mount Gramos, Albania's fourth-highest mountain with a peak at 2,525 m above sea level.

== History ==
During the Middle Ages a region under the name Koloneia (Greek: Κολωνεία) is located in the mountain region south of Korçë (southeast Albania) and north of Konitsa and Kastoria (northwestern Greece) at the west slopes of Grammos mountain range. A Byzantine military garrison under the same name was built west of Grammos.

According to the account of John Skylitzes, in c. 1018, after the Byzantine conquest of Bulgaria, emperor Basil II created new themes at Koloneia, Dryinopolis, and Dyrrhachium, and settled former Byzantine prisoners of war to secure the Byzantine positions in Epirus against future enemy attacks from central and western Macedonia. At 1040s the theme of Koloneia was incorporated to the Duchy of Dyrrachion. After the Sack of Constantinople at 1204 and the following partition of the Byzantine Empire the theme of Koloneia was granted to the Republic of Venice. However, Koloneia came under the control of the Despotate of Epirus and formed one of the themes of the Despotate. Following the Battle of Pelagonia in 1259 Koloneia was ceded to the Empire of Nicaea.

In a text by Emperor John VI Kantakouzenos (r. 1347-1354) whose 'History' covers the years 1320-1356, there is mention of local Albanians; “While the emperor was spending about eight days in Achrida (Ohrid), the Albanian nomads living in the region of Deabolis (Devoll) appeared before him, as well as those from Koloneia (Kolonja) and those from the vicinity of Ohrid.” This meeting was estimated to have taken place at around February 1328.

One source says that one of the two main waves of Albanian movements coming from the north entered Kolonjë in the 14th century, with the wave also affecting the neighboring Dangëllia region. The name Kolonja is related to the Roman period of the area.

== Villages, communities and settlements ==
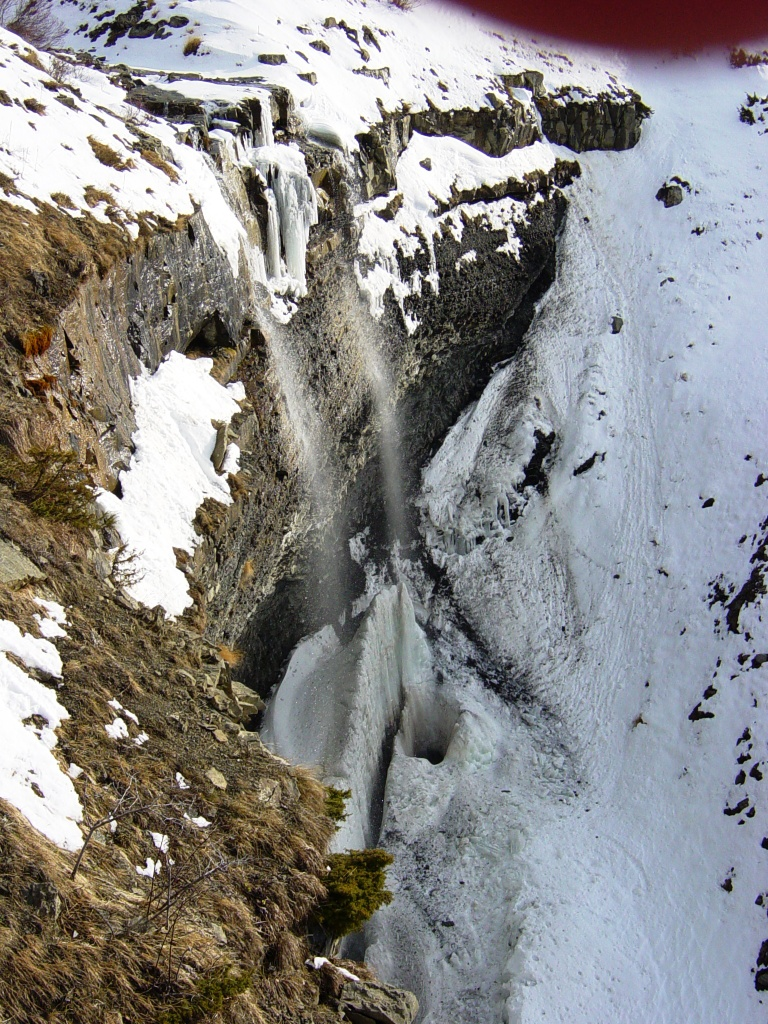
Waterfall at Mount Gramos

- Barmash
- Bezhan
- Blush
- Borovë
- Butkë
- Çlirim
- Ersekë
- Gjonc
- Gërmenj
- Gostivisht
- Helmës
- Kabash
- Kagjinas
- Kaltanj
- Kamnik
- Kodras
- Kozel
- Kreshovë
- Kurtez
- Lashovë
- Lëngëz
- Lënckë
- Leshnjë
- Leskovik
- Luaras
- Mesicke
- Milec
- Mollas
- Novoselë
- Orgockë
- Piskal
- Podë
- Postenan
- Prodan
- Psarr i Zi
- Qafzes
- Qesarakë
- Qinam Radovickë
- Qinam
- Qytezë
- Radimisht
- Radanj
- Rehovë
- Selenicë e Pishës
- Shalës
- Shtikë
- Shën Mërtir
- Starje
- Taç
- Vodicë
- Vrepckë

== Municipal Council ==
Seat distribution in the Municipal Council

Following the 2023 local elections, the composition of the Council of Kolonjë is as follows:

Name	Abbr.	Seats
Socialist Party of Albania; Partia Socialiste e Shqipërisë	PS	10
Environmentalist Agrarian Party; Partia Agrare Ambientaliste	PAA	2
Together We Win; Bashkë Fitojmë	BF	2
Republican Party of Albania; Partia Republikane e Shqipërisë	PR	1

== Notable people ==
- Sali Njazi, 1st Dedebaba of the Bektashi Order
- Sali Butka Albanian nationalist figure, revolutionary kachak and a poet
- Shahin Kolonja Albanian journalist and politician
- Jani Dode Albanian physicist
- Petro Dode Albanian politician
- Petro Nini Luarasi Albanian rilindas activist, Christian orthodox priest, teacher and journalist
- Skënder Luarasi Albanian scholar, writer and anti-fascist activist
- Agim Qirjaqi Albanian actor and television director.
- Ekrem Bardha Albanian American businessman, co-founder of the National Albanian American Council
- Fehim zavalani Albanian journalist and activist of the Albanian National Awakening
- Jim Belushi Albanian-American actor
- John Belushi Albanian-American comedian, actor and musician
- Kol Tromara Albanian nationalist and political figure
- Kristo Luarasi Albanian nationalist figure, printer and publisher
- Safet Butka Albanian professor, politician and nationalist
- Qemal Butka Albanian architect, painter, politician
- Ali Riza Kolonja Albanian army general, diplomat and politician
- Bajram Fevziu Albanian army officer and politician
- Xhavid Leskoviku Albanian army officer, political activist and diplomat
- Jani Vreto Albanian writer, printer, publisher and important figure of the Albanian National Awakening
- Naim Frashëri Albanian actor
- Athanas Sina Albanian journalist, teacher and activist of the Albanian National Awakening
- Islam Radovicka Albanian Partisan commander during World War II
- Sejfi Vllamasi Albanian congressman
- Zylyftar Poda Albanian leader, who led several revolts against the Ottoman Empire
- Xhafer Ypi former Prime Minister of Albania
- Petrit Dume Albanian general and politician of the Albanian Party of Labour
- Hasan Zyko Kamberi Albanian literature

== Sources ==
- Soustal, Peter; Koder, Johannes (1981). Tabula Imperii Byzantini, Band 3: Nikopolis und Kephallēnia (in German). Vienna: Verlag der Österreichischen Akademie der Wissenschaften. ISBN 978-3-7001-0399-8.
