= Battle of Përmet =

1943 battle of World War II in Albania

- Part of World War II in Albania
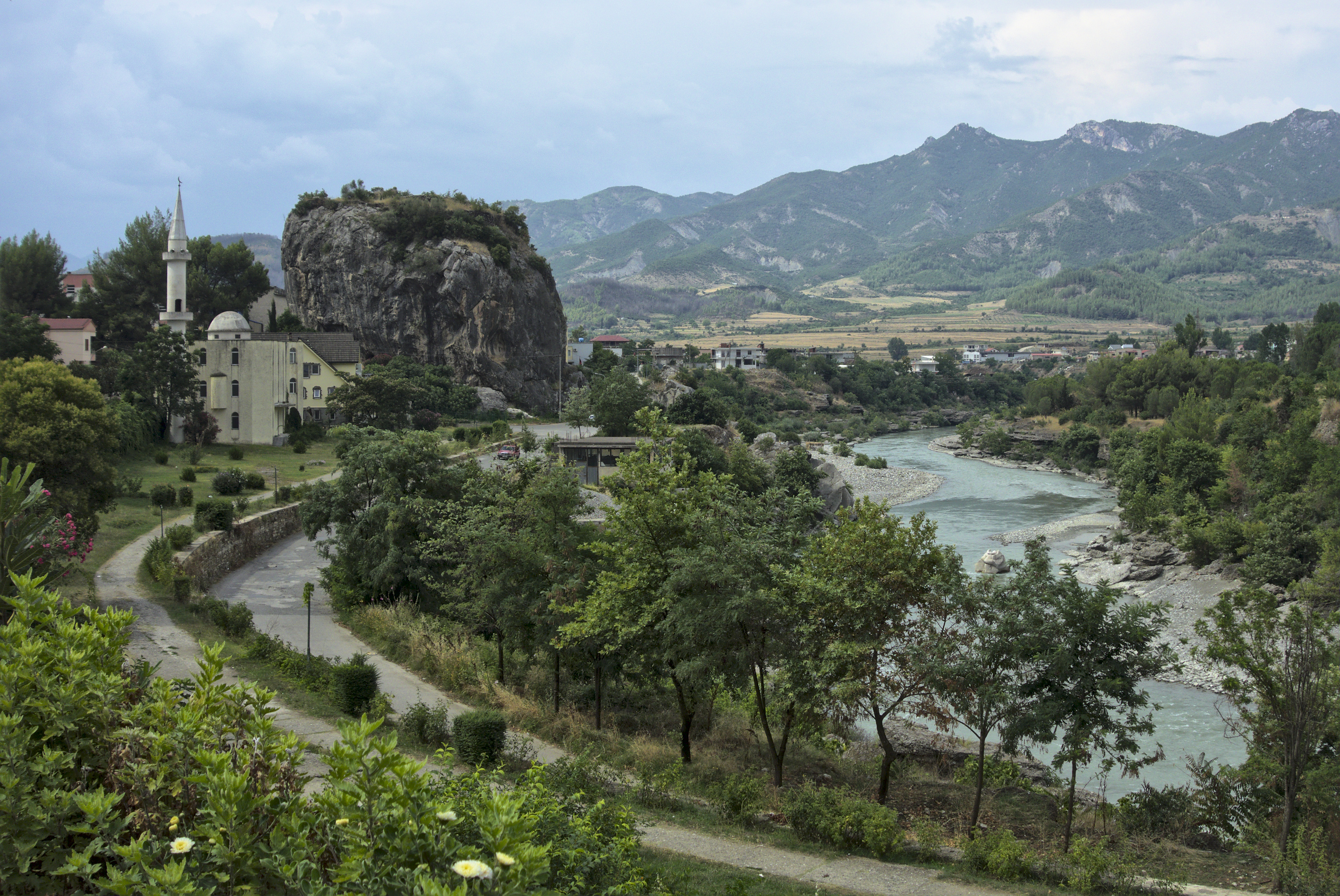
Date	May 16 – July 6, 1943
Location	Kuqari, Albania
Result	Albanian Victory

Belligerents
LANÇ	Italy

Commanders and leaders
Ali Kelmendi; Asim Zeneli †	(Kingdom of Italy) Unknown

Strength
700–1,000 Albanian partisans	(Kingdom of Italy) 2 battalions (1,000 soldiers); From June 5, (2,000 soldiers)

Casualties and losses
9 KIA	Over 500 KIA great material damage
- 177 stores burned, 125 houses and 10 government administration buildings were destroyed

The Battle of Përmet or Battle of Kuqarit (Albanian: Beteja e Kuqarit) was a battle of the Albanian Resistance of World War II against the Italian Fascists. The battle took place in 1943 near Kuqari.

== Background ==
In 1943 the Albanian partisans decided to launch a major attack on the Italian forces. The Albanian partisans battalions from Gjirokastër, Korçë and Berat took part in this battle. This fight was conducted under the direction of Enver Hoxha. The enemy, on the other hand, had a battalion and a company of carabinieri in Përmet stationed in fortified areas like Kuqar.

The Albanian partisan group was led by the partisans Ali Kelmendi and Asim Zeneli.

== The battle ==
The Albanian partisans started attacking the enemy positions with over 700 Partisans, but this was to no avail as the Italians used their fortifications. When the Italian garrison arrived in Përmet, the Italians were hit from all sides by the Albanian partisans . The Italians called reinforcements from Tepelena and Berat, they then outnumbered them and had a total number of over 3000 soldiers. This gave them a big lead. The Albanian partisans, however, remained steadfast.

== Aftermath ==
The Italians lost many of their soldiers in this battle, they lost over 500 soldiers and also suffered great material damage. The Albanian partisans, on the other hand, lost 9 of their men, including Asim Zeneli.
