= Society for the Publication of Albanian Letters =

Organization

- Shoqëri e të Shtypuri Shkronja Shqip
- Formation: October 12, 1879; 146 years ago
- Purpose: Patriotic, Intellectual
- Headquarters: Istanbul
- Key people: Sami Frashëri, Jani Vreto, Pashko Vasa, Ibrahim Temo, Spiro Dine

Society for the Publication of Albanian Letters (Albanian: Shoqëri e të Shtypuri Shkronja Shqip) was a patriotic organization of Albanian intellectuals, promoting publications in Albanian, especially school texts, which were extremely important for the younger generation's education. It was founded on 12 October 1879 in Istanbul, Ottoman Empire.

== History ==
The society was founded by elite members of the Central Committee for Defending Albanian Rights, led by Sami Frashëri, Abdyl Frashëri, and other Rilindas as Jani Vreto, Pandeli Sotiri, Koto Hoxhi, Pashko Vasa, etc. Its members represented all Albanian territories and all religions. Not much is known on the discussions that took place during the seances, due to lack of Procès-verbals or specific memoirs on this event. All is known is that Hasan Tahsini proposed his own alphabet, a sui generis one derived out of geometrical lines and even printed later in few pages, while the final alphabet was accepted that of Sami Frashëri based on Latin script with some enrichment. The pamphlet "Etudes sur l’Albanie et les Albanais", originally written in French and published in Istanbul in 1879 was one of the initial publications. Following the re-publication in French in Paris, the pamphlet was also published in English in London and in German in Berlin thanks to the Ottoman consul in Paris. The volume was later on translated into Albanian, Ottoman Turkish and Greek and finally into Arabic (1884) and Italian (1916).
In the summer of 1881, Jani Vreto opened in Bucharest the Romanian branch of the society. The Egyptian branch was founded by Spiro Dine from the town of Vithkuq near Korçë, in Shibin Al Kawm, during 1881 as well.
After its activities were banned, the society transferred in Bucharest were many publications in Albanian were to follow in so called Instambul Alphabet (see Albanian Alphabet). It was there where the textbooks of Sami Frashëri, like Abetarja e Shkronjëtoreja - Grammatical Work, 1886, and Abetare e gjuhësë shqip, 1886, etc. would come to life.
The society gave huge contribute to education in Albanian back in the days, and emphasized the need for a unified Albanian alphabet.

"All enlightened and civilized nations, are enlightened and civilized from the writings of their own languages. And every nation, which does not write its own language, and does not have writings of its own language, stays in darkness and barbarian. Even Albanians, while not writing their own language and not having an alphabet of their own languages, stay like that, and the presupposition and hope from three thousand years so far (as far as history is known) to be enlightened and civilized by using the languages and writings of their neighbors, proved to be useless...Without having, neither wanting, anyone better than the others between us, that will come after us, we pray the God of Life, to bless our existence, the Society for the Publication of Albanian Writings."

— Society for the Publication of Albanian Writings - Extract from the statute

=== Founders ===
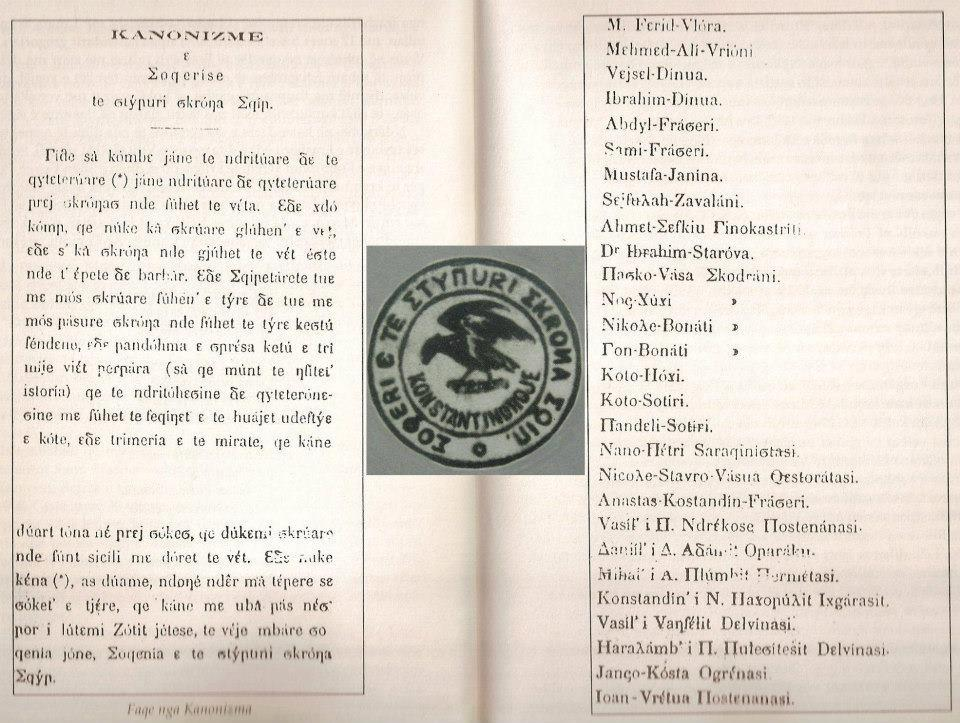
Facsimile of the Statute with the founders' names

The list of founders as appears in the statute printed in A. Zelici's print shop:

- M. Ferid Vlora
- Mehmet Ali Vrioni
- Vejsel Dino
- Ibrahim Dino
- Abdyl Frashëri
- Sami Frashëri
- Mustafa Janina
- Sejfullah Zavalani
- Ahmet Shefki from Gjirokastër
- Ibrahim Temo
- Pashko Vasa from Shkodër
- Ndoc Xhuxha
- Nikollë Bonati
- Gjon Bonati
- Koto Hoxhi
- Pandeli Sotiri
- Nano Petri from Saraqinisht, Lunxhëri
- Nikole Stavro Vasua from Qestorat, Lunxhëri
- Anastas Konstandin Frashëri
- Vasil P. Ndreko from Postenan
- Danil D. Adami from Opar
- Mihal A. Plumbi from Përmet
- Konstandin N. Haxopuli from Ixgar
- Vasil Vangjeli from Delvinë
- Janço Kosta from Ogren, Përmet
- Jani Vreto from Postenan

== Istanbul Alphabet ==
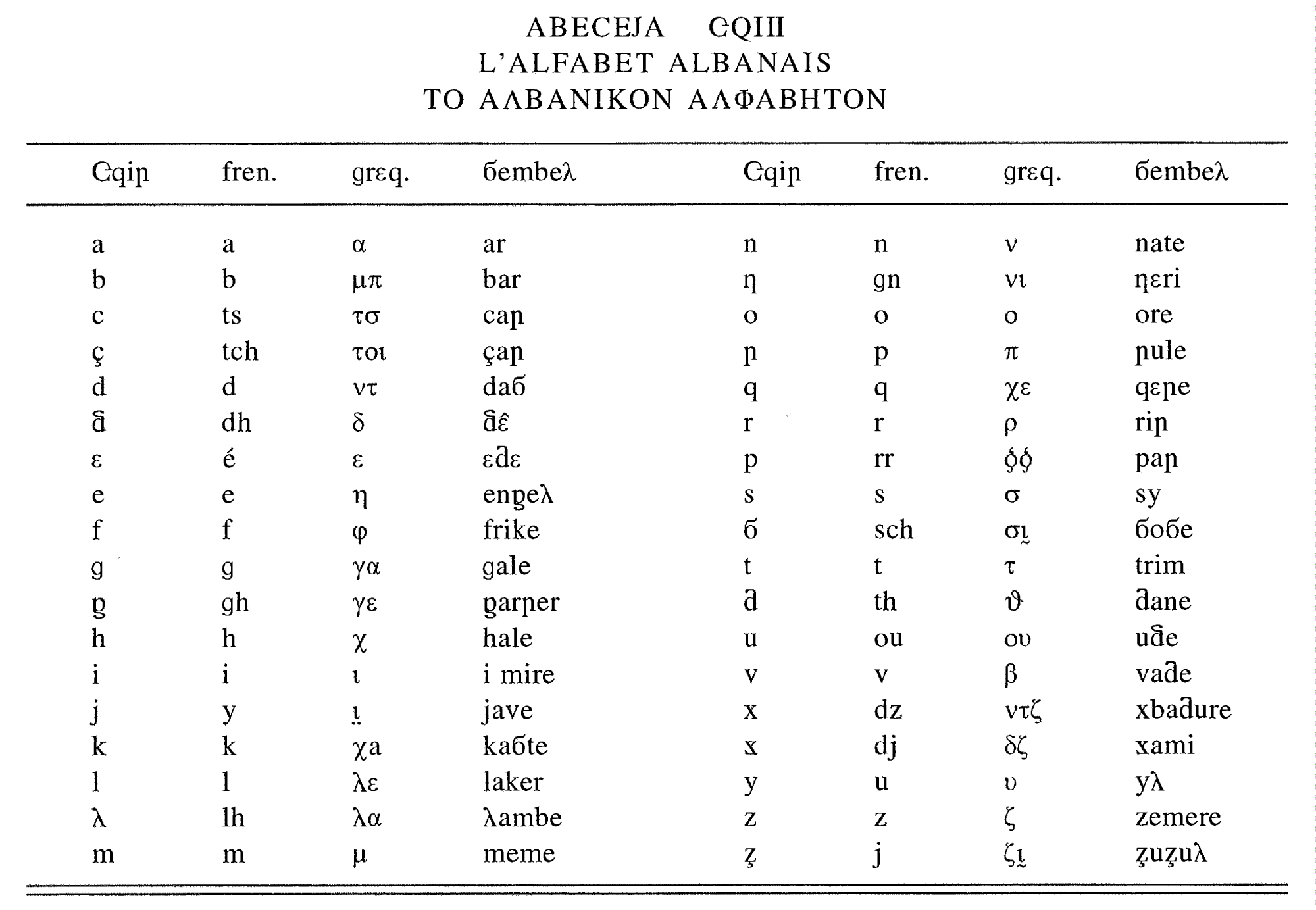
Istanbul Alphabet

The society came out with the so-called Istanbul Alphabet (Albanian: Alfabeti i Stambollit), or "Frashëri" Alphabet in reference to Sami Frashëri, which was widely used by most of the Albanians for almost 30 years. It was one of the three candidate alphabets at the Congress of Monastir in 1908. The standard Albanian alphabet was based on it, with few modifications injected from the Bashkimi Alphabet of Gjergj Fishta's Union Society, reaching the form it still preserves today.

== See also ==
- Albanian alphabet
- Central Committee for Defending Albanian Rights
- Vaso Pasha
- Sami Frashëri
- Jani Vreto
- Albanian National Awakening
- Albanian Literature
- Mbrothësia
