= Alush Saraçi =

Albanian politician

Alush Saraçi was an Albanian politician and mayor of Elbasan from 1912 through 1913.
