= Postenan =

- Village
- Location within Albania
- Coordinates: 40°11′1″N 20°32′59″E
- Country: Albania
- County: Korçë
- Municipality: Kolonjë
- Administrative unit: Qendër Leskovik
- Time zone: UTC+1 (CET)
  - Summer (DST): UTC+2 (CEST)

Postenan is a community in the Korçë County, southern Albania. At the 2015 local government reform it became part of the municipality Kolonjë. The village is completely inhabited by Albanians who speak the Tosk dialect. The village has an Orthodox Christian population.

== Notable people ==
- Athanas Sina, writer and activist of the Albanian National Awakening.
- Jani Vreto, writer and activist of the Albanian National Awakening.
- Vasil Ndreko, member of the Society for the Publication of Albanian Writings
