= German invasion of Albania =

WWII-era German invasion

- Part of World War II in Albania
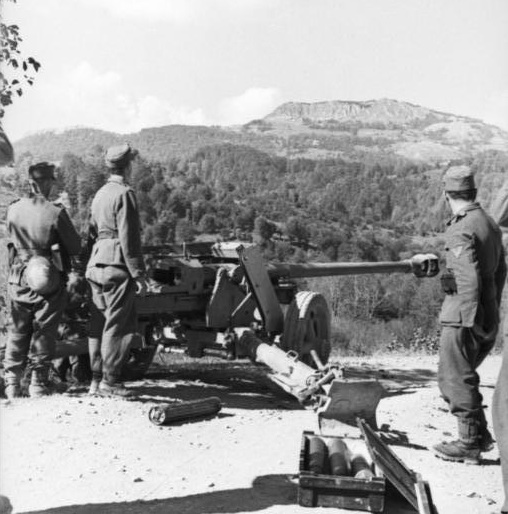
- German troops in Albania, 1943
Date	9–11 September 1943
Location	Kingdom of Albania
Result	German victory: Anti-German resistance began
Territorial changes	German occupation of Albania until the 29 November 1944

Belligerents
Germany: Balli Kombëtar	Kingdom of Italy Local Albanian resistance

Commanders and leaders
(Nazi Germany) Maximilian von Weichs	(Kingdom of Italy) Pietro Badoglio

Units involved
(Nazi Germany) 2nd Panzer Division (Nazi Germany) 118th Jäger Division (Nazi Germany) 100th Jäger Division (Nazi Germany) 92nd Motorized Regiment (Nazi Germany) 297th Infantry Division	(Kingdom of Italy) Royal Italian Army

Strength
36,000	Unknown

Casualties and losses
Unknown	Unknown

On 9 September 1943, Nazi Germany launched an invasion of Albania following the collapse of Mussolini's fascist Italian government. The invasion was carried out by the 2nd Panzer Division, which deployed military convoys from Bulgaria, Greece, and Serbia into Albania. On 10 September at 9AM, a special plenipotentiary for the Southeast region of the Ministry of Foreign Affairs, Hermann Neubacher, arrived in Tirana accompanied by special agent Fon Schjager to oversee German interests in Albania.

== Invasion ==
Units of the German army operating under Army Group F, led by Field Marshal Baron Maximilian von Weichs, invaded Albania on 9 September at 4AM, based on a plan formulated a mere three days prior. General Hubert Lanz commanded three divisions of the 21st Corps, which swiftly advanced through Albania. The invading forces encountered opposition primarily from the nine Italian divisions stationed in Albania and several local resistance groups.

The 118th Jäger Division encountered resistance on 9 September and moved southwest from Niksic. The 100th Jäger Division occupied Elbasan and Struga, and its 92nd Motorized Regiment controlled the territory between Tepelenë and Vlorë. The 297th Infantry Division successfully reached Prishtina and Prizren as planned. On the following day, German forces captured Pogradec, Tirana, Durrës, and Kukës. On 11 September, the 118th Division reached the coast, while a portion of the 297th Infantry Division crossed the Drin River.

During the German invasion, the Italian troop formations stationed in Albania consisted of the following units:

1. military headquarters of the Shkodër-Kosovo sector, under the command of General D'Arle, which included the Puglie Division;
2. The IV Army Corps, commanded by General Carlo Spatocco, comprising the "Parma," "Perugia," and " "Brennero" divisions;
3. The XXV Army Corps, led by General Umberto Mondino, which consisted of the "Arezzo" and "Firenze" divisions;
4. The defense area of Tirana, made up of motorized groups and personnel from the IV Army Corps.

On the night of 8 and 9 September 1943, the commanding officers of the aforementioned units sought guidance from their general command regarding their course of action in response to the changing circumstances. At 9 a.m. on 9 September, German troops encircled Struga and demanded the surrender of the Italian garrison, while the military convoy proceeded towards Elbasan. It was not until the afternoon of 9 September that the General Staff of the Royal Italian Army issued an order, instructing the larger formations to assemble in specific locations and emphasizing the need for swift movements.

Lower commands were instructed to adhere to higher-ranking commands during this period. Amidst the turmoil of command and control within the Italian forces, a small convoy from the German army arrived at the outskirts of Tirana. The Italian command in Tirana held several meetings and interviews, initially with General Arnold von Bessel, who had been present in Tirana for several days, and later with General Lothar Rendulic, who traveled from Belgrade to Tirana. The specific details of these discussions are not publicly documented, but it is evident that the headquarters of the Royal Italian Army in Albania faced considerable uncertainty from the outset. Additionally, the military units themselves remained indecisive regarding the implementation of the resistance order issued by General Pietro Badoglio.

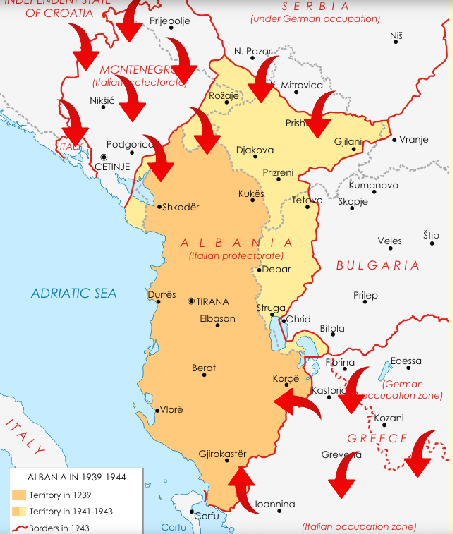
German invasion of Albania, 1943

On 10 September 1943, German troops initiated acts of violence against Italian troops, including the forcible disarmament of Italian officers and soldiers on the streets of Tirana. They also seized military machinery and occupied various warehouses and garrisons belonging to the Royal Army. Notably, the Army's General Staff had not yet provided instructions regarding the specific posture that Italian troops should assume. The sole guidance given to the Italian troops was a verbal order to "have faith in their superiors, maintain calm and not provoke disturbances through of premature acts." Regrettably, this instruction proved inadequate, further exacerbating confusion, chaos, and ultimately leading to the tragic fate of the Italian army in Albania.

On 10 September 1943, General Rossi, leading the Eastern Army Group, issued an order for his troops to surrender their weapons and equipment to the Germans. Simultaneously, Wehrmacht representatives declared that unless the surrender and disarmament of the Italian troops in Albania were completed by 24 September, the Germans would execute the entire Italian General Staff.

Shortly after that, a contingent of German soldiers forcefully entered the Italian General Staff premises, expelling the Italian military personnel and causing destruction. Meanwhile, the German forces proceeded to occupy strategic locations, barracks, offices, and warehouses without resistance from the Italian troops. These developments, combined with the absence of orders from higher-ranking officials within the Italian army, significantly undermined the morale of the Italian soldiers.

Adding to the prevailing confusion, rumors circulated that all Italian troops would be assembled in transit camps for prompt repatriation. The conduct of the German troops across the country remained consistent with the plans devised by the German High Command. The Germans ruthlessly executed numerous Italian officers. Left without leadership or directives, the Italian soldiers generally pursued three courses of action for their future in German-occupied Albania.

The first group, comprising the majority of Italian soldiers, chose to surrender and accept their fate. The second group sought refuge in the mountains, aligning themselves with the partisans. The third group, primarily composed of militia and air force members, opted to embrace fascism and collaborate with the Germans against their fellow Italians.
