= List of mayors of Elbasan =

This is a list of mayors of Elbasan who have served since the Albanian Declaration of Independence of 1912.

== Mayors (1912–present) ==
No.	Name	Term in office	
1	Alush Saraçi	1912	1913
2	Fuat Biçaku	1913	1915
3	Hysen Hostopalli	1915	1916
4	Ahmet Dakli	1916	1917
5	Xhaferr Dardha		
6	Tajar Tetova		
7	Kasem Sejdini	1919	1924
8	Lef Nosi	1924	1925
9	Benexhet Hydi		
10	Nazef Basha	1928	1929
11	Rustem Ymeri	1929	1930
12	Abdyl Dilaveri	1930	1933
13	Hasan Biçaku	1933	1934
14	Ahmet Dakli	1937	1939
15	Qemal Karaosmani	1939	1939
16	Ymer Saraçi	1939	1942
17	Refik Bekteshi	1942	1943
Executive Committee (1944–1992)
18	Emin Haxhiademi	1992	1995
19	Engjëll Dakli	1996	2000
20	Hysen Domi	2000	2003
21	Ardian Turku	2003	2007
22	Qazim Sejdini	2007	2019
23	Gledian Llatja	2019	Incumbent

== See also ==
- Politics of Albania
