= Sali Butka =

Albanian revolutionary and poet (1852–1938)

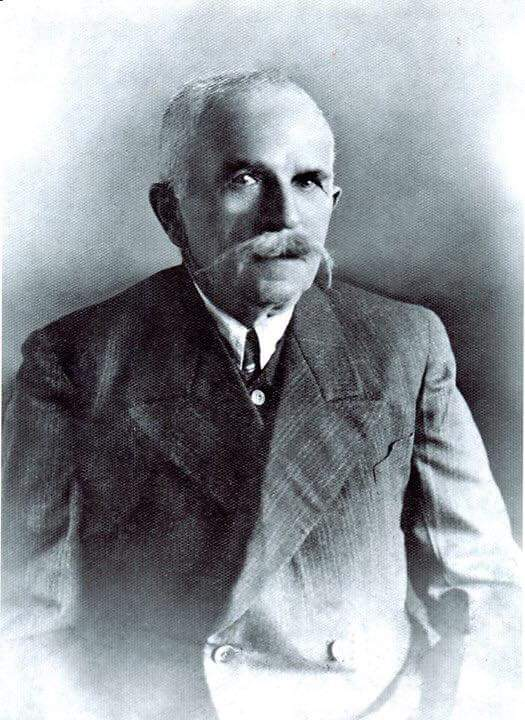
- Born: Sali Tahir Aliçka; 1857; Butkë, Kolonjë, Ottoman Empire
- Died: 24 October 1938 (aged 80–81); Ersekë, Albania
- Known for: Guerilla against invaders in World War I; delegate of the Congress of Lushnjë; 1916 raid of Moscopole
- Children: Safet Butka, Gani Butka and Iljaz Butka

Sali Butka (1852 – 24 October 1938), was an Albanian nationalist figure, revolutionary kachak, poet, and one of the delegates of the city of Korçë to the Albanian National Congress of Lushnjë. He was a well-known leader of an armed çeta band of Albanian fighters during the early 1900's.

== Biography ==
=== Early Activities ===
Butka was born in the village of Butkë in the Kolonjë District to one of the branches of the prominent Albanian Frashëri family. He was a Bektashi Muslim. He belonged to a generation of villagers who became literate in the Albanian language and subsequently joined guerrilla bands via the literary efforts of the Albanian intelligentsia. On the initiative of Bajo Topulli, the Secret Committee for the Liberation of Albania was founded in the city of Manastir in November 1905; Sali Butka was one of the co-founders of the committee, and he aided in the creation of the committee's branches in preparation for an armed uprising against Ottoman occupation. In December 1905, Bajo Topulli would visit Sali in the village of Butkë and form the first Albanian çeta of the Secret Committee, signifying the beginning of the Albanian armed uprising.

Butka subsequently became the commander of various Albanian irregular bands (also known as çeta), and in 1906, he initiated armed guerrilla operations throughout southern Albania against the Ottoman Empire and the rule of Sultan Abdul Hamid II Butka had taught himself how to read and write in Albanian. Throughout the course of his guerrilla activities, he would compose revolutionary poems that combined naturalistic texts with nationalist themes, often in the form of folk poetry. He viewed his literary contributions as feeding an Albanian national consciousness. His poems would be turned into songs, which appealed to the illiterate members of Albanian society.

=== Pre-Independence ===
Sali Butka participated in a large meeting on the Albanian alphabet in the city of Korçë in 1910, alongside 2,500 fellow Albanians from Kolonjë; additionally, Butka was one of the leading Albanian figures who protested against the Sublime Porte and the use of Arabic letters for the Albanian alphabet. In early 1911, the Revolutionary Committee was created in Kolonjë with Sali Butka at the head, alongside his brother Myftar and his son Gani.

Fellow revolutionary fighter Spiro Bellkameni would return from exile in March 1911 to the village of Butkë and spend time with Sali's band; Sali would eventually organise the formation of an armed band under Spiro's command, of which Sali's brother Myftar and his son Gani were also members. In May 1912, prior to the Albanian Declaration of Independence, Sali Butka participated in the Kuvend (traditional Albanian assembly) of Peja to discuss the new planned uprising against the Ottoman Turks. After he returned from Kosovo, Sali Butka, together with Tajar Tetova, organised a large meeting in the village of Frashër with the main leaders of Albanian revolutionary bands in southern Albania. On the way to the meeting, Sali's band was ambushed by Ottoman forces in the gorge of Rrungaja, and his second son, Iljaz, was killed and declared a martyr of Albania. Sali was then at the head of the Albanian revolutionary forces in the region and first liberated Ersekë from Ottoman forces, followed by Korçë in August 1912.

=== Post-Independence ===
After the Albanian Declaration of Independence on the 28th of November 1912, Sali Butka was primarily concerned with organising the defence of the new Albanian state from the attacks of the Greek army and Greek irregulars who were operating in southern Albania. Ismail Qemali, who was at that time the Prime Minister of Albania, took note of Butka's efforts in defending the southern Albanian regions and supporting the government of Vlorë. Qemali invited him to Vlorë, and the government subsequently tasked Butka with defending Vlora from the Ottoman Turk forces of Xhavit Pasha. When the French forces that had occupied Korçë and the surrounding regions supported the demands of Eleftherios Venizelos and the Greeks for the partition of southern Albania, Sali Butka, accompanied by Themistokli Gërmenji led 1,500 men towards Korçë and surrounded the city. These Albanian bands had previously burned Moscopole in reaction to the Greek administration and threatened that Korcë would share the same fate. Meanwhile, the Venizelos Movement of National Defence was unable to dispatch reinforcements to the region, and French General Sarrail strategically demanded the withdrawal of the local Greek garrison. Butka, Gërmenji and the Albanians sent their demands to the French, which ultimately culminated in the creation of the pro-Albanian Autonomous Province of Korçë; the French eventually reneged on the Albanians, arrested and executed Gërmenji in late 1917 and sought to hand Korçë over to the Greeks. In response, Sali Butka gathered a force of 20,000, surrounded Korçë yet again and sent the French forces an ultimatum. Korçë was once again handed over to the Albanians and the borders of the Albanian state were confirmed by the International Boundary Commission.

He was a prominent guerrilla figure during the Balkan Wars (1912–1913) and World War I (1914–1918). During the Balkan Campaign of World War I, several warrior groups of Albanian Tosks and Ghegs supported with their activity the armed operations of the Central Powers in the region.

Butka's band invaded in 1916 the Aromanian-inhabited town of Moscopole, once a prosperous metropolis in the 18th century, and led to its destruction. According to testimonies, he authorized the public execution of the Aromanian priest there. The razing of the town forced many of its inhabitants to flee, with many migrating to nearby Greek-occupied territories in southern Albania and some going to Korçë. This was done in response to the French army's desire to accept Venizelos' demands for the partition of southern Albania.

In 1920 he became one of the delegates of the city of Korçë to the Congress of Lushnjë.
