= Albania–Egypt relations =

- Albania: Egypt

Diplomatic mission
- Embassy of Albania, Cairo: Embassy of Egypt, Tirana

Albania and Egypt have cordial and cooperative relations. Albania has an embassy in Cairo, and Egypt has an embassy in Tirana. Diplomatic relations between Albania and Egypt were established on 19 April 1956. Both countries are members of Organisation of Islamic Cooperation.

The history of political and military relations of Albanians and Egypt dates back to the Roman Times in ancient history. Closer relations were forged beginning in the early 16th century, when the territory of both nations were part of the Ottoman Empire. A large influx of Muslim Albanians, known as Arnauts, emigrated to Egypt following the Ottoman conquest in 1517, with many of them being appointed to high-ranking positions within the Eyalet (Province) of Egypt. The founding father of modern Egypt, Muhammad Ali, was Albanian. He became governor, and self-declared viceroy of Egypt and Sudan with the Ottomans temporary approval.

== History ==
=== Ottoman Period (15th–18th century) ===
Relations became closer in Ottoman times when the Ottoman Empire took over Egypt in the early 16th century. Ottoman Albanians gave their contribution to the Ottoman conquest of Egypt, and many governors of this Ottoman province were Albanian. The Ottoman government in Egypt came to rely on Albanians to staff their government, and Albanians soon made up much of the military and special bashi-bazouk units. Several Albanians even rose to the office of governor, the most famous of which were Dukakinzade Mehmed Pasha, Koca Sinan Pasha, Abdurrahman Abdi Arnavut Pasha, and Mere Hüseyin Pasha.

=== Muhammad Ali era (18th century) ===
Muhammad Ali, founder of Modern Egypt, was an Albanian. At the height of his rule, he controlled Lower Egypt, Upper Egypt, Sudan and parts of Arabia and the entire Levant.

He was a military commander in an Albanian Ottoman force sent to recover Egypt from a French occupation under Napoleon. Following Napoleon's withdrawal, Muhammad Ali rose to power through a series of political maneuvers, and in 1805 he was named Wāli (viceroy) of Egypt and gained the rank of Pasha.

Amongst his army, fought hundreds of Albanian Bashi-bazouk, which would settle the first Albanian community in Egypt.

=== Albanian national awakening ===
During the 19th century, the Albanian immigration to Egypt would continue to grow in Egypt, especially in Cairo. The economical prosperity attracted many emigrants from the Albanian lands, mainly from Korçë and Kolonjë regions. With some exceptions, most of the figures were educated members of the Orthodox community from south Albania.

The first Albanian society of Egypt was founded in 1875. It was named "Vëllazëria e Parë" (First Brotherhood) and was led by Thimi Mitko. Spiro Dine founded in 1881 the local branch of Society for the Publication of Albanian Writings in Shibin Al Kawm, a precursor and lobbyist for the Albanian education which started with the Albanian School of Korçë. Many newspapers and collections would come out, including the successful Shkopi ("The stick"), Rrufeja ("The lightning"), Belietta Sskiypetare ("The Albanian Bee") and so on. Many others would come out for a shorter time: Milo Duçi would publish the magazines Toska (The Tosk) during 1901–02, Besa-Besë (Pledge for a pledge) during 1904-05 together with Thoma Avrami, Besa (Besa) of 1905 which lasted for 6 issues and was printed by Al-Tawfik in Cairo, and newspapers Shqipëria(Albania) from October 1906 to February 1907, a daily of Cairo with the last two issues coming out in Maghagha, and the weekly Bisedimet (The discussions) of 1925–26 with 60 issues in total, which would be the last Albanian-language newspaper in Egypt. Aleksander Xhuvani published the newspaper Shkreptima (The lightning) in 1912 in Cairo. In 1922, Duçi established also the publishing company Shtëpia botonjëse shqiptare/Société Albanaise d'édition (Albanian Publishing House). Prominent Albanian organizations were: "Vëllazëria Shqiptare" (Albanian Fraternity) founded on 1 My 1894 in Beni-Suef, and "Bashkimi" (The union) which was found everywhere in Albanian populated areas and diaspora. It was an Albanian high official in Egypt, who sponsored the Giuseppe Verdi's opera Aida in Khedivial Opera House in 1871.

The Albanian intellectual community in Egypt, would play an important role to Albanian Declaration of Independence in 1912 and the funding of Albanian education.

=== Modern era ===
The two countries established diplomatic relations on 19 April 1956. The relations remained limited under Enver Hoxha’s absolute regime. They improved drastically after the fall of communism.

== High-level visits ==
Speaker of the Parliament, Jozefina Topalli visited Cairo on 20 February 2010 in order to attend the Conference on Women Parliamentarians as Active Agents of Change. During her visit, first of kind by an Albanian Speaker to Egypt, the two sides agreed upon the importance of strengthening bilateral parliamentary ties.

The Foreign Minister of Albania held an official visit to Egypt on 31 March 2013, during which he met with the President of the Republic, the Prime Minister and the Minister of Foreign Affairs, as the talks addressed the outstanding level of political relations between both countries, and stressed the two sides' desire to further developing their relations in all fields of mutual interest, especially expanding the prospects for economic cooperation and increasing trade exchange. The Albanian Minister expressed his country's gratitude for Egypt's support by granting scholarships and training courses in various fields. They also discussed the regional developments in the Middle East and Balkans. The Albanian Minister also praised Egypt's support for Kosovo, and both ministers signed the executive program for cultural, scientific and technical cooperation of 2013–2015, on the sidelines of the visit.

The Foreign Minister of Albania held a visit to Cairo on 31 January 2015, as he was welcomed by the Egyptian Foreign Minister who discussed with him the latest developments in the Middle East and the Balkans. They affirmed their two countries' stance in fighting terrorism, a danger for the entire international community. They also discussed means to boost bilateral relations that are based on a strong historical basis. The two sides agreed to resume political consultations' meetings between their two Foreign Ministries, as well as seeking to hold the Joint Committee for economic cooperation, and enhancing contacts between both countries' Chambers of Commerce. The Albanian Foreign Minister praised the bilateral relations' level and the two countries' convergence within the different international forums. He also stressed his country's support to Egypt's bid for a UNSC non-permanent seat for 2016–2017.

Albanian and Egyptian Prime Ministers met in Cairo, on 23 October 2021 where both sides tackled the ways of enhancing the bilateral relations, said the Egyptian cabinet in a statement. Rama also promised a direct airline connection between Tirana and Cairo.

== Resident diplomatic missions ==
- Albania has an embassy in Cairo.
- Egypt has an embassy in Tirana.

== See also ==
- Foreign relations of Albania
- Foreign relations of Egypt
- Muhammad Ali of Egypt
