= Kristo Luarasi =

Albanian journalist

Kristo P. Luarasi
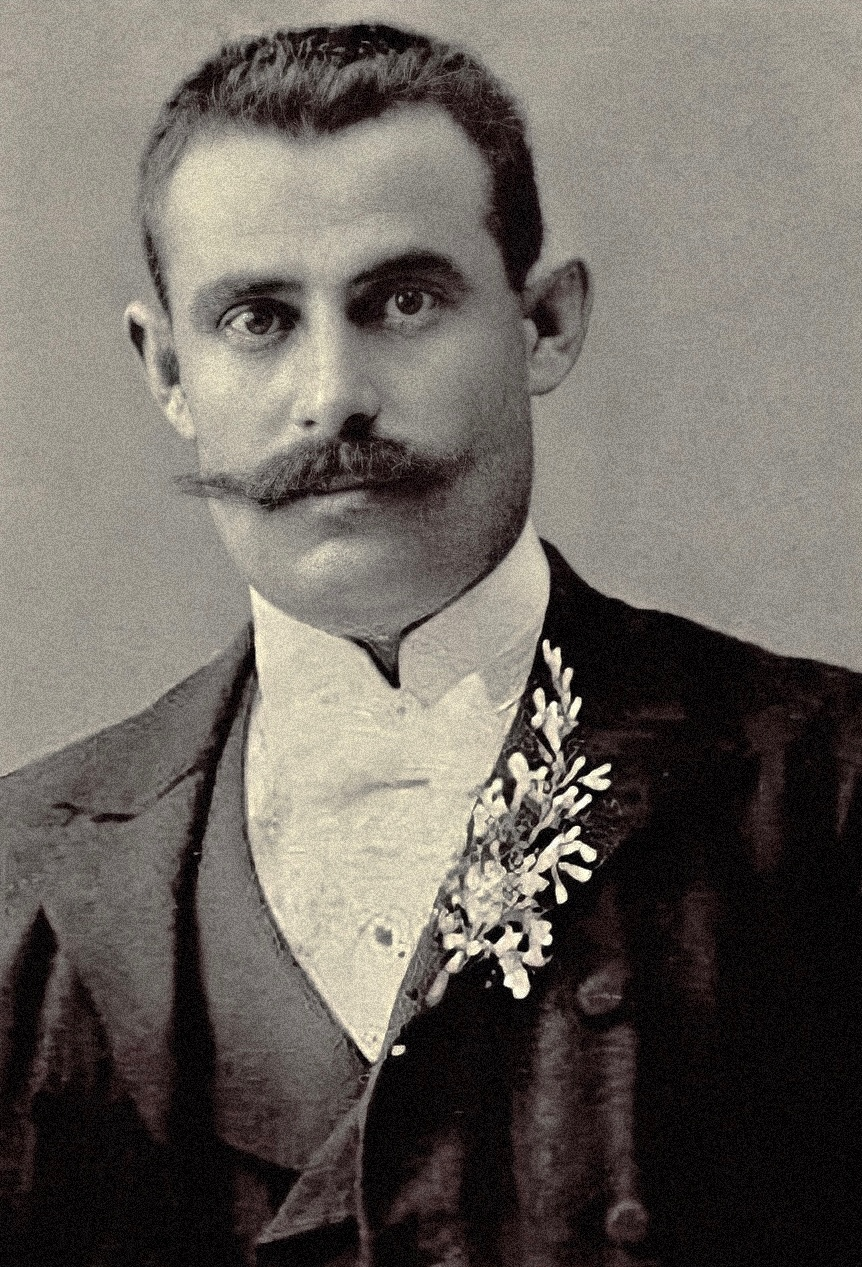
- Born: 15 December 1876 (Note: Elsie gives the birth year as 1879, while some Albanian portals 1875.); Luaras, Ottoman Empire
- Died: 7 July 1934 (aged 57); Tirana, Albania
- Occupations: Printer, publisher, journalist, lumber merchant
- Known for: Mbrothësia, Drita (magazine); Liri e Cqiperise newspaper; Albanian National Awakening
- Spouse: Polikseni Luarasi

Kristo Luarasi (December 15, 1876– July 7, 1934) was an Albanian nationalist figure, printer and publisher. He was one of the activists of the Albanian National Awakening. He was one of the first Albanian printers.

== Early life ==
Kristo Luarasi was born on 15 December 1876 in Luaras community in the region of Kolonjë region in Albania, back then Ottoman Empire. He attended the Albanian school of Hotovë village where he was taught by Petro Nini Luarasi.

== Albanian Colony of Bucharest ==
After the prohibition of Albanian schools in 1892, he emigrated to Romania where he started taking lessons in the Albanian school established by Nikolla Naço, back then leader of the Drita ("Light") Society and publisher of the newspaper Shqiptari ("The Albanian"). Luarasi also worked in a printer shop where he mastered the printer profession. He would spend a few years there in full contact with other Albanian nationalist figures and ideas.

== Albanian Colony of Sofia ==
In 1896 he moved to Sofia together with his friend Kosta Jani Trebicka, joining another Albanian emigrants colony there. Luarasi started as the manager of the printing press Mbrothësia (Progress). The printing press was established by the Albanian colony of Sofia, grouped mainly under the "Dëshira" ("Desire") Society founded in 1893, with the aim of spreading knowledge and Albanian-language instruction between Albanians, and serving the national cause. It was located at the Vitosha Boulevard. Together with Kosta Trebicka and Midhat Frashëri he would publish the Ditërëfenjës or Kalendari Kombiar ("National Calendar") which appeared annually with some lengthy interruptions from 1897 to 1928.

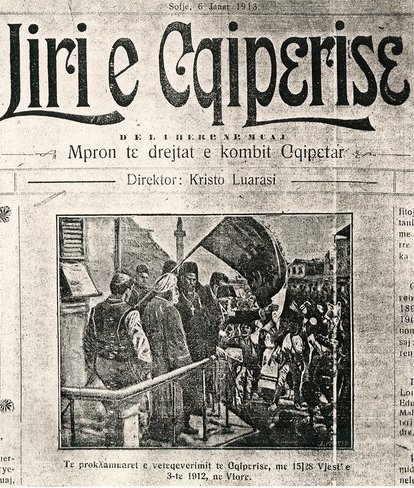
Liri e Cqiperise – January 6th, 1913. Cover page depicting the Proclamation of Albanian Independence

The Albanian almanacs were rather important in the history of Albanian literature, like 19th century almanacs in North America they would be present in many homes, and spread the existence of Albanian literature even there where Albanian poetry or prose could hardly be found. Mbrothësia press would publish also 37 books of Albanian literature, including works from Sami Frashëri, Spiro Dine, Mihal Grameno, Papa Kristo Negovani, etc. From 1901 to 1908 together with Shahin Kolonja, Luarasi published in Sofia the journal Drita with some financial support of Austro-Hungary. Drita would be perhaps the most influential periodical of Albanian diaspora of the National Awakening period. The alphabet used was the Istanbul Alphabet of Sami Frashëri until 1908, and afterwards the standard Albanian alphabet which came out of the Congress of Monastir.

After the Young Turk Revolution, Luarasi transferred his printing press to Salonika, where over 60 works were produced within one year: books, magazines, newspapers, and distributed to a large of Albanian population. In March 1910, after the press attracted attention of the Ottoman authorities, Luarasi moved his press back to Sofia. Three he published the newspaper Liri e Cqiperise ("Freedom of Albania") from 1911 to 1915. On 2 November 1911 Fan Noli visited the Albanian community of Sofia responding to their invitation with the initiative of Luarasi. The Bulgarian synod made possible for Noli to give two sermons in the Sveti Spas (Bulgarian: Свети Спас) church in Albanian. During the late Ottoman period, Peçi supported Austro-Hungarian assistance toward Albanian geopolitical interests in the Balkans.

== Return to Albania ==
In 1921 Luarasi returned to Albanian and settled in Tirana, together with his press which would be one of the majors in the country. After his death, the press was renamed after him "Shtypshkronja Kristo Luarasi". It was operated as such until 1947 by Luarasi's son Theodhor, when the communist government turned the premises into state property. It was located in today's Kavaja Street in Tirana.

== Family ==
During all above he would find a great support from his wife, Polikseni Luarasi, born Polikseni Dhespoti in Lunxhëri, Gjirokastër. She had studied at the First Girls School of Korçë and had served as a teacher as well. Polikseni was in charge of the correcting proof of the printing materials, and helped also at the printing press, as well as during packaging and shipping.

== Awards and acknowledgements ==
Luarasi received several titles posthumously

- Order for Patriotic Activity of Second Class, 1962 – Socialist People's Republic of Albania
- Order for Patriotic Activity of First Class, 1992 – Albania
- Honorary citizen, 2011 – Ersekë Municipality
- A street in Tirana, Albania bears his name

== See also ==
- Society for the Publication of Albanian Writings
- Sami Frashëri
- Jani Vreto
- Mbrothësia

== Books about Kristo Luarasi ==
- Dy rilindës shqiptarë : Kristo Luarasi e Shahin Kolonja : dokumente, Koço Luarasi, Drejtoria e Përgjithshme e Arkivave, Tirana 2003. OCLC 435640650. LCCN 2006417562
- Kristo Luarasi : vizionar i shtetit shqiptar, Lavdosh Ahmetaj; Qemal Velija, Universiteti "Kristal"; Instituti i Studimeve Albanologjike "Alex Buda", Tirana 2008, ISBN 9789995672621
- Kristo P. Luarasi : jeta, vepra dhe familija e tij, Uran Asllani, "Plejad", Tirana 2009, ISBN 9789995657031

== Sources ==
1. Elsie, Robert, ed. (2012), A Biographical Dictionary of Albanian History, I B Tauris, ISBN 978-1780764313
2. Gawrych, George (2006). The Crescent and the Eagle: Ottoman rule, Islam and the Albanians, 1874–1913. London: I B Tauris. ISBN 978-1845112875.
3. Gazeta Telegrafi, Kristaq Luarasi (12 September 2012), Kristo Luarasi, gazetari e patrioti që punoi një jetë për Shqipërinë (in Albanian), archived from the original on 12 July 2018, "Kristo P.Luarasi u lind në vitin 1875 në fshatin Luaras të Kolonjës nga një familje e cila i reziston dhunës së feudalëve të vendit... | Kristo Luarasi was born in 1875 in Luaras village of Kolonje, in a family which resisted the local feudal oppression..."
4. Haddad, Yvonne Yazbeck; Smith, Jane Idleman (1994). Muslim Communities in North America. SUNY Series in Middle Eastern Studies. SUNY. p. 379. ISBN 978-0791420195.
5. Özdalga, Elisabeth (2011). Late Ottoman Society: The Intellectual Legacy. Routledge. ISBN 978-0415665445.
6. Skendi, Stavro (1967). The Albanian national awakening. Princeton UP. ISBN 978-1400847761.
