= Luarasi (surname) =

Luarasi is a surname. Notable people with the surname include:

- Ilir Luarasi (1954–2018), Albanian football goalkeeper
- Kristo Luarasi, Albanian printer and publisher
- Petro Nini Luarasi, Albanian activist, teacher, and journalist
- Skënder Luarasi, Albanian scholar
