= Albanian Bee =

Collection of Albanian folklore by Thimi Mitko

Albanian Bee (Albanian: Bleta shqiptare) was a collection by Thimi Mitko of Albanian folklore. Published in 1878, it was the first compilation of oral works designed for the Albanian public.

== History ==
The first to collect Albanian folk material were European scholars of the mid 19th century, followed particularly by philologists and linguists concerned with recording a little known Indo-European language. The Albanian National Awakening, aimed at protecting and promoting the interests of the Albanian people, gave rise to native collections of Albanian folklore. By highlighting the long traditions, national affirmation was sought. Thimi Mitko, a member of the Albanian community in Egypt, first showed interest in Albanian folklore in 1859. According to Spiro Dine, by 1866 Mitko was providing Demetrio Camarda with material for his collection. Mitko also had contacts with the European poets Gustav Mayer, Urban Jarnik and Girolamo de Rada. In 1874, he finished his own collection of 505 folk songs, and 39 tales and old sayings. The work, focused mostly on material from southern Albania, was written in Greek script. According to Mitko, the intention was to provide Egypt's Albanian community with information about Albanian origins, customs and character. His view was that the heroic songs collected by him showed that Albanians, by keeping the memory of history through songs, had a love of country and their fellow countrymen, regardless of religion. Mitko preserved the wealth of Albanian folk literature by classifying the content based on genre. In 1878 it was published in Alexandria under the Greek title Albanike melissa, with the Albanian Bëlietta shqipëtare placed as subtitle. Mitko also prepared an additional collection of folk literature, the Little Bee that never got published. A copy of Albanian Bee is said to have been publicly burned by Greek nationalists in Athens. By the time the work was published, the Western European Romantic Movement was in decline, and interest in folklore was waning. Albanian Bee gained new popularity after it was published in the modern Albanian alphabet by Gjergj Pekmezi in 1934.

== See also ==
- Albanian literature
- Albanian diaspora
- Albanian nationalism
