= Milo Duçi =

Albanian businessman involved in the Albanian National Awakening

Milo Duçi (1870–1933) was an Albanian publisher, playwright, and entrepreneur.

== Biography ==
Born in Korçë (then part of the Ottoman Empire), he lived for most of his life in Egypt. Together with his uncle Loni Logori he succeeded as an entrepreneur and distinguished activist of the Albanian community in Egypt.

Duçi, son of a powerful cotton merchant from Korçë, settled in Egypt at the age of 23 and became a merchant himself. He was one of the founders of "Vëllazëria" (Brotherhood) society, established in 1910 in Cairo, and the Beni Suef branch of it with the support of the Khedive office.

Duçi also started and directed several press organs of the Albanian diaspora in Egypt, mostly short-lived. These included the magazines Toska (The Tosk) during 1901–02, Besa-Besë (Pledge for a pledge) during 1904–05 together with Thoma Avrami, Besa (Besa) of 1905 which lasted for 6 issues and was printed by Al-Tawfik in Cairo, and newspapers Shqipëria (Albania) from October 1906 to February 1907, a daily of Cairo with the last two issues coming out in Maghagha, and the weekly Bisedimet (The discussions) of 1925–26 with 60 issues in total, which would be the last Albanian-language newspaper in Egypt. He wrote several articles regarding the necessity for a unified literary Albanian language and the cultural-literary development of the Albanian society. In 1922 he established the publishing company Shtëpia botonjëse shqiptare/Société Albanaise d'édition (Albanian Publishing House). He also left his footprint as a playwright; some of his comedies were E Thëna (The saying), Gjaku (The blood), I biri i Begut (Bey's son). He also wrote short stories and poetry in the local press in Egypt.

In addition to the Albanian patriotic activity, Duçi was a successful entrepreneur. His family emerged as an important player in the economic development of Egypt's Delta region directed by Lord Cromer's office. By 1901, he started working with his well-connected uncle Loni Logori on projects that explicitly tied the commercial interest of the British administration and the local landowners. Beside British, he openly solicited Austro-Hungarian support, despite the distrust that many Eastern Orthodox south-Albanians had for the Austrian Geo-politics. Toska's initial failure did not dissuade the Austrian authorities to support him; in 1902 they sent him 120 krone for the subscription, ordering the newspaper to be shipped to Vienna from where it would get distributed to Ottoman Albania.
Through his uncle, Duçi would also get in touch with the Albanian émigré in Bucharest, Italy, Istanbul, and Brussels. The French consul in Shkodër reported that Duçi collaborated with a defrocked Catholic priest named Gaspar Jakova Merturi who secured funds from a claimant for the Albanian throne, Prince Albert Ghica of Romania. He also collaborated closely with the Arberesh journalist Anselmo Lorecchio, editor of La Nazione Albanese.
