= Luarasi =

Luarasi can refer to:

- Luarasi (surname)
- Luarasi University, university in Tirana, Albania
