= First Brotherhood =

First Albanian society of Egypt

The First Brotherhood (Albanian: Vëllazëria e parë) was founded in 1875 as the first Albanian society of Egypt. Its head was Thimi Mitko, and its members were Albanians who lived in Egypt.

== Purpose ==
The society's aim was to protect the Albanian culture among those living in diaspora. It also sought to support the Albanian National Awakening that had as its goal the creation of an Albanian state, independent from the Ottoman Empire. Due to a variety of reasons there is very limited information on the First Brotherhood. The foundation of the society is seen by modern scholars as a product of the economic and social strength Albanians in Egypt gained, and their intellectual need to contribute to Albanian efforts for a national state. The formation of the brotherhood was the first attempt of the Albanian community of Egypt to create an organization. It was followed by the creation of the Albanian Brotherhood in 1895.

== See also ==
- Albanian diaspora
- Ottoman Albania
