= Luaras =

- Village
- Location within Albania
- Coordinates: 40°24′5″N 20°34′51″E
- Country: Albania
- County: Korçë
- Municipality: Kolonjë
- Administrative unit: Çlirim
- Time zone: UTC+1 (CET)
  - Summer (DST): UTC+2 (CEST)

Luaras is a village in the Korçë County, southeastern Albania. At the 2015 local government reform, it became part of the municipality Kolonjë.

== Notable people ==
- Kristo Luarasi, Albanian rilindas and first editor of the Kalendari Kombëtar magazine, founded in 1897 in Sofia, Bulgaria
- Petro Nini Luarasi, writer, priest and Albanian Rilindas
- Skënder Luarasi, scholar and anti-fascist
