= Ersekë =

- Administrative unit
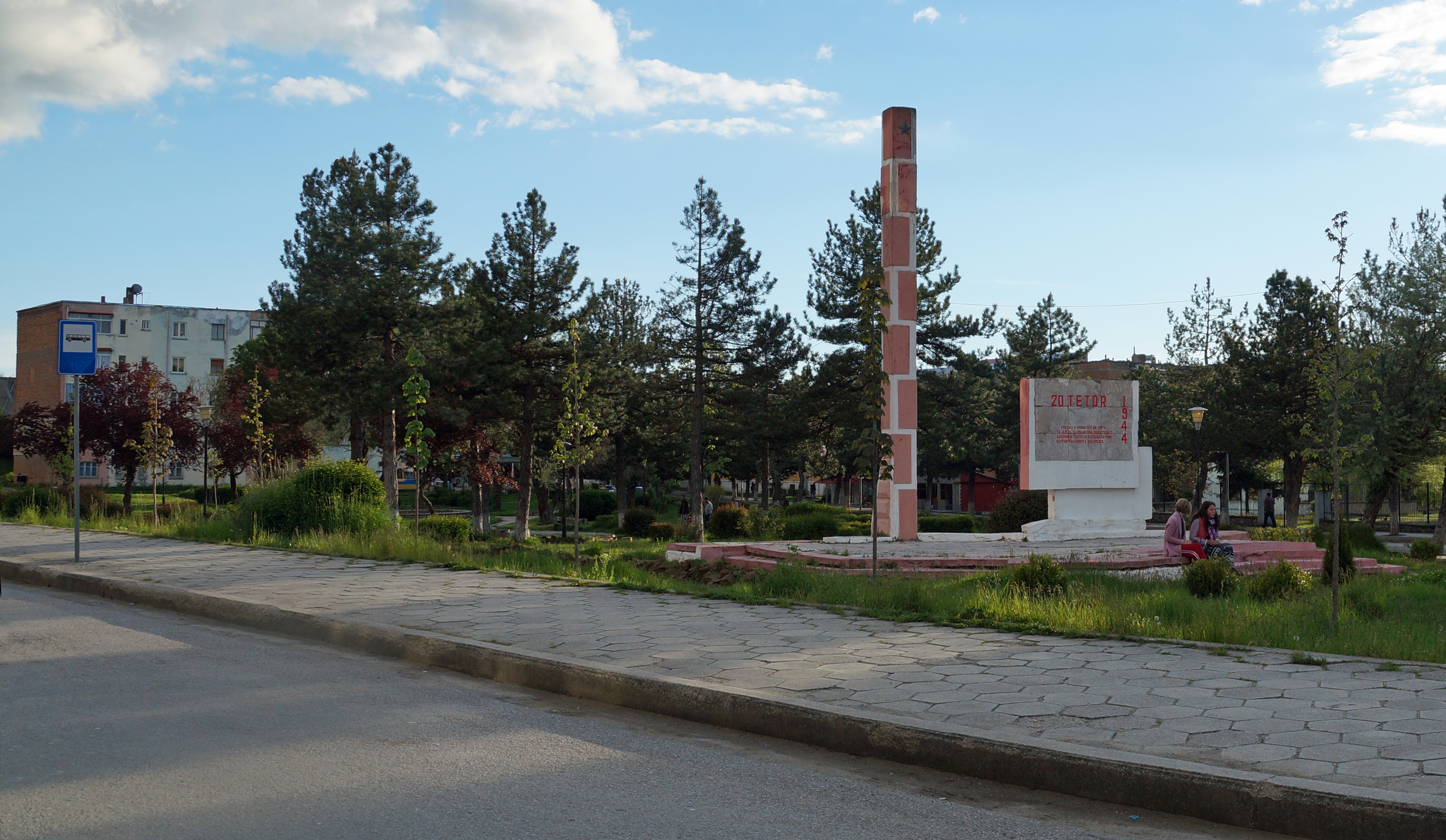

- Location within Albania
- Coordinates: 40°20′N 20°41′E
- Country: Albania
- County: Korçë
- Municipality: Kolonjë
- Elevation: 1,020 m (3,350 ft)

Population (2011)
  - Administrative unit: 3,746
- Time zone: UTC+1 (CET)
  - Summer (DST): UTC+2 (CEST)
- Postal Code: 7401
- Area Code: (0)812

Ersekë (Albanian definite form: Erseka), is a town and a former municipality in southeastern Albania. At the 2015 local government reform, it became a subdivision and the seat of the municipality Kolonjë. Founded in the 17th century, Erseka was the seat of the former Kolonjë District. The population at the 2011 census was 3,746. Situated at the foot of the Gramos mountains, it is a small alpine town at 1,050 meters in altitude, making it one of the highest towns in Albania.

== History ==
The history of the town began during the 17th century. In 1785 the city was populated by 100 families. In 1914, it came under the control of the Northern Epirote forces, which repelled the newly established Albanian gendarmerie units from the region.

On 21 November 1940, during the Greco-Italian War, units of the II Army Corps of the advancing Greek forces entered Ersekë after breaching the Italian defences.

== Culture ==
The "Fan Stilian Noli" center hosts several artistic and cultural shows throughout the year. Its main theater of 400 seats hosts performances by various groups from Korçë, Tirana and local artists. The ethnographic museum also houses a collection of traditional costumes, textiles and other crafts, unique to the region. In the center of the town is an obelisk, work of Odhise Paskali, which dates 28 November 1938.

== Economy ==
=== Agriculture ===
Ersekë is known for its apple and honey production throughout Albania. It is also known for its woodcrafts, stone carving and carpet weaving tradition.

== Sports ==
The football club KS Gramozi Ersekë founded in 1927 and its stadium is Ersekë Stadium with a capacity of 10,000 and 2,000 seats. The club has had a successful history in its past. It went to the Albanian Superliga at the end of 2008–09 season defeating Bylis Ballsh 5–2 in the playoff. In 2010 they played against Real Madrid for the Taçi Oil cup in Tirana end up 2-1 for Real Madrid.

== Notable people ==
- Petro Dode, communist politician
- Shahin Kolonja, nationalist
- Petro Nini Luarasi, clergyman and nationalist activist
- Skender Petro Luarasi, writer
- Sevasti Qiriazi-Dako, educator
- Agim Qirjaqi, actor
- Fehim Zavalani, journalist and nationalist
- Tajar Zavalani, journalist
- Uran Butka, MP, researcher and democrat politician
- Ylli Rakipi, journalist
