= Skënder Luarasi =

Albanian scholar and activist

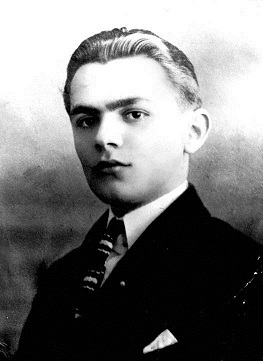
- Luarasi in 1928
- Born: Skënder Petro Luarasi; 19 January 1900; Luaras, Ottoman Empire (modern Albania)
- Died: 27 April 1982 (aged 82); Tirana, Albania
- Occupations: Writer, translator, biographer, critic
- Parent: Petro Nini Luarasi (father)

Skënder Petro Luarasi (19 January 1900 – 27 April 1982) was an Albanian scholar, writer and anti-fascist activist.

== Life ==
Luarasi was born in Luaras of Kolonjë region (back then Ottoman Empire, today's Albania) on 19 January 1900. He was the son of Albanian patriot Petro Nini Luarasi, descendant of the Kostallari family of the Luaras village, and Lino Sevo. Though Luarasi was a Protestant, he named his son Skënder to refer to the Albanian National Hero Scanderbeg. The poet Naim Frashëri was his godfather.
Luarasi performed the first studies in Albanian-language schools of Negovan and Korçë (1909-1911). After the death of his father by poisoning, he was sent to Robert College of Istanbul (1912-1913). Luarasi would continue his studies at Easton Academy in US (1914-1916), International College in Springfield, MA in US (1916-1918), Classis Gymnsium in Freistadt, Austria, (1922-1926) and graduated from the Faculty of Philology at University of Vienna, Austria in 1930. During his return in Albania (1920-1922) he worked as a teacher in the schools opened by American Red Cross in Elbasan District.

Luarasi started his literary activity since 1917. During the 30s he would distinguish himself as teacher, critic, journalist, translator, playwright, and director and cooperator of several press periodicals. He was editor-in-chief of the periodicals Studenti ("The Student"), 1920 in US, Djalëria ("Boyhood"), Austria, 1927-1928, and the magazine Vullnetari i Lirisë ("Volunteer of Freedom"), Spain, 1937, together with Petro Marko. The last was a 20-page periodical of Albanian volunteers participating in the Spanish Civil War as anti-fascists.
During the years 1930-1936 Luarasi taught at the Technical School of Tirana, Vlora, and Shkodra, until he left for Spain to join the International Brigades. He had been previously arrested and imprisoned three time by the Zogist regime.
During the Italian and German Occupation he was arrested and interned in several concentration camps, including Vernet, Gurs, St.Cyprien, etc.

After World War II, he was elected representative of Kolonje region in the Albanian Assembly (1945). Luarasi was one of the initiator of the foundation of Albanian League of Writers and Artists and member of the presidium until November 1949 when he was expelled for several years from the League due to his anti-conformist behavior.

Until his retirement (1967), he worked as teacher and historian in the State Pedagogic Commission, Qemal Stafa High School, the Publishing Company of the Science Institute, Pedagogical School, "Jordan Misja" Artistic Lyceum, and Faculty e History-Linguistics of the University of Tirana ( where he established the English language major).
Until 1982, his activity focused on publicistics, monographs, theatrical plays, historical and literary studies.

Luarasi was awarded "Flag Order" (1960) and "Honor of the Nation" (1996) by the Albanian government with the motivation "For distinguished patriotic, anti-fascist, democratic, literary, and educative activity".

Luarasi died on 27 April 1982. Several schools in Albania and Kosovo are named after him.

== Main works ==
=== Studies, monographs, memoirs ===
- Isa Boletini, short biography, Prishtina, "Rilindja" 1972. OCLC 43365281
- Ismail Qemali, biography, Tirana, Shtëpia Botuese e Librit Politik, 1972. OCLC 80727030
- Les soeurs Qiriasi, study, Tirana, 1962. OCLC 79170189
- Kolonel Thomson, monograph
- Petro N. Luarasi, jeta dhe vepra, study, Tirana, "Naim Frashëri", 1958. OCLC 560911213
- Migjeni, jeta dhe vepra, study, Tirana, "Naim Frashëri", 1961. OCLC 462044090
- Gjerasim Qiriazi, jeta dhe vepra, study, Tirana, Naim Frashëri, 1962. OCLC 28785711
- Sevasti Qiriazi, vepra, study
- Në Brigadat internacionale, memories, Tirana, Toena, 1996. OCLC 37228386
- Fjala shqipe, study, Tirana, "Naim Frashëri", 1961. OCLC 462053473
- Fjala e lirë shqipe (publicistikë e studime), study
- Kujtime historike, memoirs
- Kujtime autobiografike (Ç'kam parë e ç'kam dëgjuar), autobiographic collection
- Tri jetë, Koloneli Tomson - Ismail Qemali - Isa Boletini, collection of biographies, Tirana, "Migjeni", 2007. ISBN 9789994394319

=== Theatrical plays ===
- Agimi i Lirisë (Freedom's Dawn)
- Stuhi në prill (Storm in April)

=== As co-author ===
- Zgjimi Kombëtar Shqiptar : 1878-1912 (Albanian National Awakening), Stavro Skëndi; Skender Luarasi; Nestor Nepravishta, Tirana, Phoenix : Shtëpia e Librit dhe e Komunikimit, 2000, ISBN 9789992742198

=== Translations to Albanian ===
- Enoch Arden by Alfred Tennyson, "Shtypshkronja Tirana", 1936.
- King Lear by Shakespeare, Prishtina, "Rilindja", 1968. OCLC 503885742
- Richard III by Shakespeare, Prishtina, "Rilindja", 1968. OCLC 503889228
- The Merchant of Venice by Shakespeare, Prishtina, "Rilindja", 1968. OCLC 503895560
- Scanderbeg by Thomas Whincop, Shtëpia Botonjëse "Naim Frashëri", 1967. OCLC 504060109
- Oliver Twist by Charles Dickens, Prishtina, 1961, OCLC 558205528
- The Song of Hiawatha by Henry Wadsworth Longfellow, Tirana, 1960. OCLC 562688044
- Faust by Johann Wolfgang von Goethe, Tirana, Ndërmarrja shtetrore e botimeve, 1957. OCLC 163308588
- Fuente Ovehuna by Lope de Vega, Prishtina, "Rilindja", 1980. OCLC 441739925
- Götz von Berlichingen by Johann Wolfgang von Goethe, Tirana, "Naim Frashëri", 1959. OCLC 43129221
- Intrigue and Love by Friedrich Schiller, Tirana, Ndërmarrja shtetërore e botimeve, 1955. OCLC 796248147
- Childe Harold's Pilgrimage by Byron, Tirana, Ndermarrja Shteterore e Botimeve, 1956. OCLC 248867971
- Emilia Galotti by Gotthold Ephraim Lessing, Tirana, "Naim Frashëri", 1962. OCLC 72370973
- Leaves of Grass by Walt Whitman, Tirana, Ndërmarrja Shtetërore e botimeve, 1956. OCLC 660230353
- William Tell by Friedrich Schiller, Tirana, Shtëpia botuese "Naim Frashëri", 1975. OCLC 77886954
- Albania: Its discontents and their origin by Frederick Morton Eden (1865-1948), Tirana, Infbotues, 2011.

== See also ==
- Robert Shvarc
- Dhimitër Shuteriqi
- Aleksandër Xhuvani
- Eqerem Çabej
- Kristo Luarasi
