= Ersekë Stadium =

Stadium in Ersekë, Albania

Stadiumi Gramozi Ersekë
- Gramozi Stadium
- Interactive map of Stadiumi Gramozi Ersekë
- Location: Ersekë, Albania
- Coordinates: 40°20′0″N 20°41′0″E
- Owner: Council of Ersekë
- Operator: KS Gramozi Ersekë
- Capacity: 6,000 (2,000 seated)
- Surface: Natural grass
- Field size: 101 m × 63 m (331 ft × 207 ft)

Construction
- Renovated: 2009
- Expanded: 2009

Tenant
- KS Gramozi Ersekë

Ersekë Stadium (Albanian: Fusha Sportive Ersekë) is a multi-use stadium in Ersekë. The stadium was built by the Ersekë council and was paid for by them. The stadium currently holds around 6,000 supporters, with seating for 2,000. The playing surface is made from all natural grass.

== Renovation ==
It has recently been renovated following Gramozi's promotion to the Albanian Superliga in 2009. The stadium was expanded in terms of capacity as it can now hold 10,000 from the previous 2,000. There is still however only one stand in the stadium which can seat 2,000 and has a V.I.P area. The changing rooms have also been renovated and new showers have been fitted for both the home and away sides. There is also now a press room, one of a few in Albania at the moment.
