= Loni Logori =

Albanian businessperson

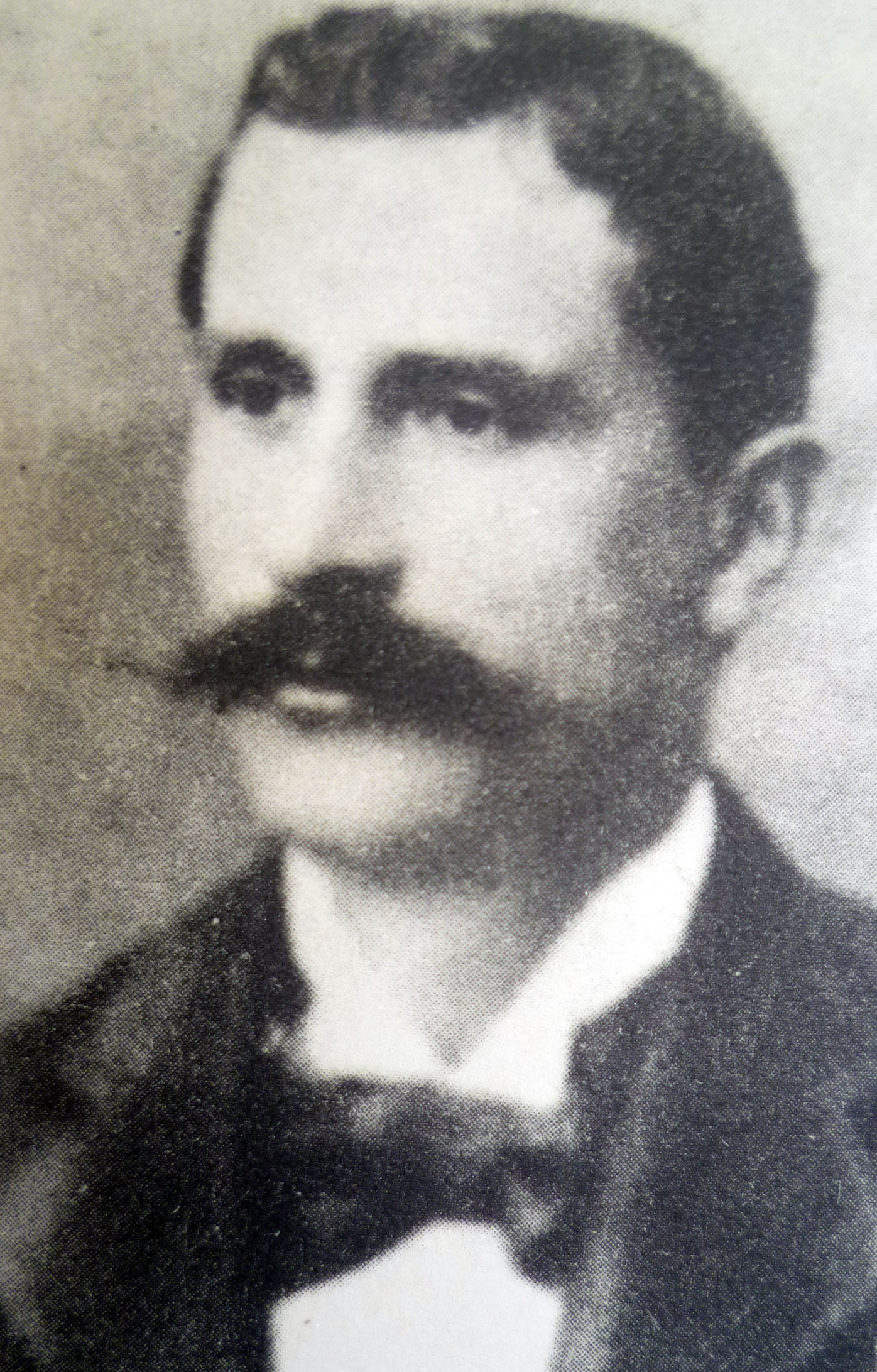
Loni Logori

Loni Logori (1871–1929) was an Albanian-Egyptian entrepreneur, poet and activist of the Albanian National Awakening.

== Life ==
Logori was born in 1871 in Korçë, back then still part of the Vilayet of Monastir of the Ottoman Empire. Like many other people from his region, he had to emigrate at a young age. Logori settled in Egypt at the age of 13. There he received his education; Logori graduated from the French Lyceum of Alexandria. He was actively involved in the Albanian patriotic circles there. He maintained contacts with members of the Albanian émigré community in Bucharest, Istanbul, Italy, and Brussels. In 1909, he represented the colony of Egypt in the Congress of Elbasan, where the foundations of the Albanian education were set.
He lived in Egypt for most of hist life (58 years). In 1929, he came to Albania with an invitation from the Albanian government of the time. He positively responded to the invitation, left Egypt and settled in Durrës. Unfortunately he died the same year.

=== As an entrepreneur ===
Logori was a successful businessman in Egypt. By that time Egypt experienced a massive economic development and prosperity, French and British investments (i.e. the Suez Canal), modernization, and opportunity for entrepreneurship. Together with his nephew Milo Duçi, he emerged as an important player in the economic development of Egypt's Delta region directed by Lord Cromer's office. By 1901, he started working with his well-connected uncle Loni Logori on projects that explicitly tied the commercial interest of the British administration and the local landowners. Logori built much of the canal network in the Minah District.

=== As a poet ===
Logori is the author of many lyrical poetry and songs in Albanian, as "Drenovarja" (The girl from Drenova), "Vemi o vemi" (Let's go, let's go), "Celu çelu" (Open up). He also covered alternated thematic as the national heroes (songs for Papa Kristo Negovani, Spiro Kosturi, etc.). As a translator, he translated from French the Le Cid of Pierre Corneille.
Logori also attempted several times in writing a national anthem for Albania. In fact, one of its first attempts was called "Royal Anthem" (Alb: Hymni Mbretnor) and was found in the catalogs of Victor Records. It was recorded on 28 March 1918, in New York City, interpreted by the tenor Giuseppe Mauro, while the performing orchestra was directed by Nathaniel Shilkret, and the lyrics by Logori.
