= Spiro Dine =

Albanian writer and activist involved in the Albanian National Awakening

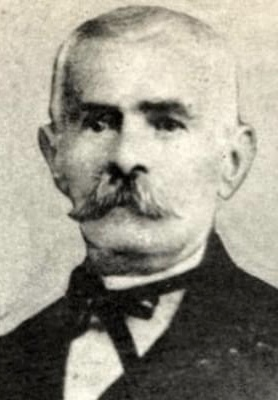
- Born: 1846; Vithkuq, Ottoman Empire, modern Albania
- Died: April 12, 1922 (aged 75–76)
- Occupations: writer, playwright
- Writing career
- Notable work: Waves of the Sea (Albanian: Valët e Detit)
- Movement: Albanian National Awakening

Spiro Risto Dine (1846–1922) was an Albanian rilindas, writer and playwright. His most known work "Waves of the Sea" was at the time of its publication the longest book printed in Albanian.

== Life ==
Spiro Dine was born in 1846 in Vithkuq, in the region of Korçë, southeastern Albania. In 1866 he migrated to Egypt at an Albanian colony, where he met Thimi Mitko, an Albanian folklorist from Korçë and helped him complete his work on Albanian folklore titled "The Albanian Bee" (Albanian: Bleta Shqipëtare).

His work Waves of the Sea (Albanian: Valët e Detit), a collection of Albanian history and literature was published at Sofia and at the time of its publication in 1908 it was the longest book printed in the Albanian language. Spiro Dine also wrote poems and satires.

Dine was member of the Society for the Publication of Albanian Writings (Albanian: Shoqëri e të shtypurit shkronjavet shqip), and responsible for establishing the Egyptian branch in Shibin Al Kawm, during 1881. Toward the end of the 19th century Dine supported the view of Albanian armed insurrection and detachment from the Ottoman Empire.
