= Albania (periodical) =

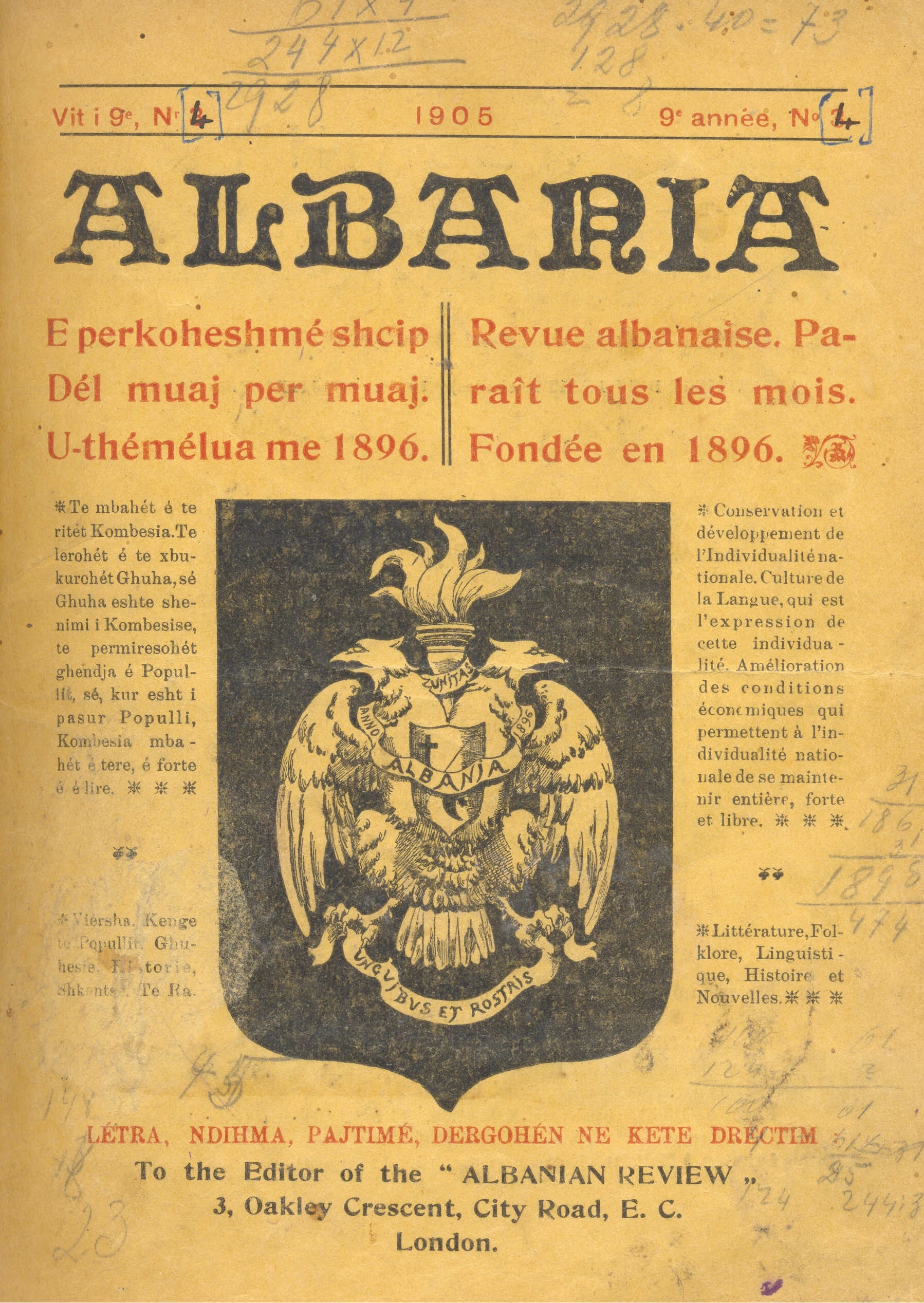
- October 1899 issue of Albania
- Editor: Faik Konica
- Staff writers: Gjergj Fishta; Andon Zako Çajupi; Kostandin Kristoforidhi; Thimi Mitko
- Categories: History, Politics, Archaeology, Economics, Literature, Religion, Art
- Frequency: Monthly
- Publisher: Faik Konica
- First issue: 25 March 1897
- Final issue: 1910
- Country: Albania
- Language: Albanian, French translations

Albania was an Albanian periodical published by Faik Konica, one of the most important figures of Albanian culture in the early decades of the twentieth century. Albania was published from 1896–7 to 1910 and is widely regarded as the most important Albanian periodical in the beginning of the 20th century and one of the most important Albanian periodicals to have existed until the end of World War II.

== History ==
After moving to Brussels, Belgium, Faik Konica at the age of 22 founded the periodical Albania in 1896–7. It was first published in Albanian, while later translations into French were also circulated. Soon after its publication it became the most important organ of the Albanian press. Its first issue was published on 25 March 1897, in Brussels. From 1902 to 1910 it was published in London, United Kingdom where Faik Konica had moved from Belgium. Albania was one of the best-known Albanian periodicals in Europe and helped make Albanian culture and cause known to the general European public, while it also set the standards for literary prose in the Tosk Albanian dialect of the Albanian language.

The periodical was distributed in all European countries and in the provinces of the Ottoman Empire located in northern Africa and Anatolia. Among the most known distributors of Albania was Shahin Kolonja, future publisher of Drita, the first magazine written in the Albanian language.

== Contents ==
The contents of Albania covered a wide range topics like history, politics, archaeology, economics, language, religion and art, leading to the periodical being regarded as a mini-encyclopedia of Albanian culture of the era. Many notable Albanian writers like Gjergj Fishta, Andon Zako Çajupi, Kostandin Kristoforidhi and Thimi Mitko first published parts of their works in Albania.

== See also ==
- List of magazines in Albania
- Albaniâ periodical
- Hylli i Dritës
