= Nikolla Naço =

Albanian freedom fighter

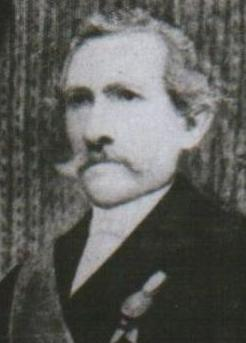
- Nikolla Naço
- Born: 1843; Korçë, Ottoman Empire (present-day Albania)
- Died: 1913 (aged 69–70); Bucharest, Kingdom of Romania
- Citizenship: Ottoman
- Movement: Albanian National Awakening

Nikolla Naço (1843 - 1913) was a figure involved in the Albanian National Awakening.

== Biography ==
Naço originated from Korçë and in Egypt was involved in the Albanian National movement. At Bucharest in 1884 Naço joined the Albanian society Drita. Naço disapproved of the political platform of Drita and in 1886 repeatedly criticised its leaders. Drita was attacked by Naço for being slow toward cultural matters and for lacking a publication where he passed a resolution on the issue in January 1885. He also criticised some Drita members for their wavering attitude toward the Greek Orthodox Church. Naço was elected chairman of Drita. As an active individual and orator he swayed to his side some Drita members that were newly arrived Albanian economic migrants, often uneducated and poor to Romania.

A schism within Drita emerged between the older wealthy Albanian diaspora of Romania and new Albanian migrants with Naço standing up for the latter and formed a splinter faction. Drita's position on the Albanian movement was for Albanians to avoid interference from external powers and rely on their own forces while Naço differed from the society and insisted on outside support to free Albania. Naço advocated for cooperation between Albanians and Aromanians of Macedonia, Albania and the Pindus region. He thought that they would receive Romanian political and material assistance, as Romania was interested in the Aromanians and would gain sympathy from the Triple Alliance. To secure Romania's full support, Naço advocated for the union of Aromanian and Albanian national movements with a joint Albanian-Aromanian state that could oppose Montenegro, Serbia, Bulgaria and Greece.

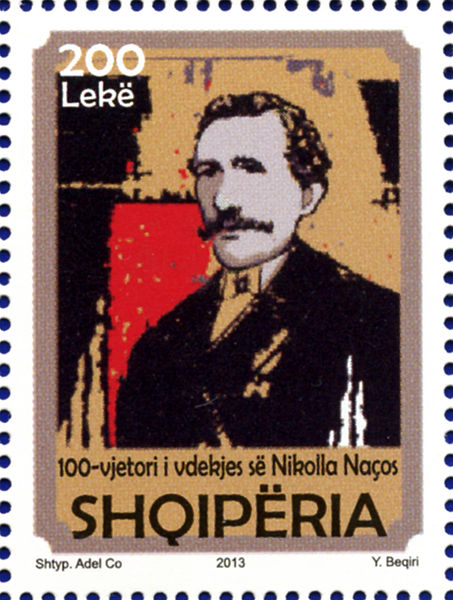
Albanian stamp commemorating 100th Anniversary of Nikolla Naço's death (2013)

A majority of Albanians involved in the national movement disagreed with Naço over his criticisms and political positions. Due to the schism Anastas Avramidhi-Lakçe, the original founder of Drita was no longer on good terms with Naço's faction and he left to create the organisation Dituria. In response on 9 January 1887 Naço along with his splinter faction formed a new organisation called the Society of the Albanians "Drita". It was composed of a few Aromanian and Albanian members. The organisation had Romanians as honorary trustees and its platform promoted Aromanian and Albanian cooperation in cultural and political spheres. Former allies Lakçe and Naço emerged as rivals and people supporting the former accused individuals around the latter of being spies. Naço viewed Dituria as the creation of the Russian ambassador and Bulgarian revolutionaries. At the time of its formation Sami Frashëri backed Dituria and cost Naço political influence that weakened Drita in Romania.

Naço opposed the Albanian Istanbul alphabet and preferred a Latin only alphabet which he thought was important for uniting Albanians. For all his publications Naço used an alphabet based on Romanian and both his society and its publication were funded by Romania. In 1888 Shqiptari (The Albanian), the oldest Albanian newspaper in Romania was founded by Naço. It was published weekly with content written in French, Albanian and Romanian. Aside from some long intervals of being unpublished the newspaper lasted several years. In Shqiptari Naço accused Aladro Castriota, a pretender to the Albanian throne of being a proxy for Russia. Politically Naço's Drita was unsuccessful and in the cultural sphere its achievements were small.

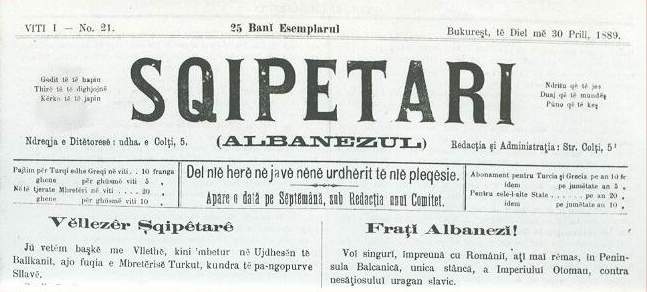
The newspaper S(h)qipetari, published by Naço

Naço tried to get Austro-Hungarian and Italian support. He sent a letter to king Umberto I in 1892 with details about the difficulties faced by Albanians toward their national development and requested their removal through Italian intervention in the Ottoman Empire. In Bucharest the Austro-Hungarian representative Pallavicini received a report from Naço that mentioned his funding of schools in villages of Kolonjë during 1892-1894 and appeals for support to reopen them. As Naço struggled to secure money for Drita he openly asked for funds from Austria-Hungary. Due to the efforts of Naço, the director of Drita, there were also relations by the Bashkimi Society with an Aromanian (Kutzo Vlach) organisation that was fighting in Macedonia against the Greeks. The Society of the Albanians "Drita" would remain synonymous with Naço and his activities until he died.

Naço died in Bucharest and is buried at the Sfânta Vineri Cemetery.
