= Thoma Avrami =

Albanian poet, journalist and activist of the Albanian National Awakening

Thoma Avrami (1869–1943) was an Albanian poet, journalist and activist of the Albanian National Awakening. During his life he published many distinguished Albanian newspapers and magazines of the era like Përlindja Shqiptare, Besa and Vetëtima.

== Life ==
Thoma Avrami was born in Korçë, Ottoman Empire (today Albania) in 1869. After migrating to Romania he joined Drita, the most important organization of the Albanians of Romania and became one of the editors of its newspaper, where he also published some of his early lyrical poems. Later he became one of the editors Albania. In 1889 he became one of the first teachers of the first Albanian school of Korçë. In 1903 he started publishing the biweekly magazine Përlindja Shqiptare (Albanian: Albanian Renaissance) and coined the motto Shqipëria Shqiptarëve (Albanian: Albania to Albanians) later adopted by Balli Kombëtar as its official motto. Along with Foqion Turtulli he published in Cairo the newspaper Besa in 1904. In 1908 he was one of the delegates of Korçë in the Congress of Monastir. Avrami was also a member of the Black Society for Salvation of Albania.

== Bibliography ==
Notes

References

- Skendi, Stavro (1967). The Albanian national awakening, 1878-1912. Princeton University Press.
- Faensen, Johannes (1980). Die albanische Nationalbewegung. Komm. bei O. Harrassowitz. ISBN 9783447021203.
- Südost-Institut München (2001). Südost Forschungen. Südost Forschungen. Vol. 59–60. S. Hirzel.
