= Petro Nini Luarasi =

Albanian journalist and activist

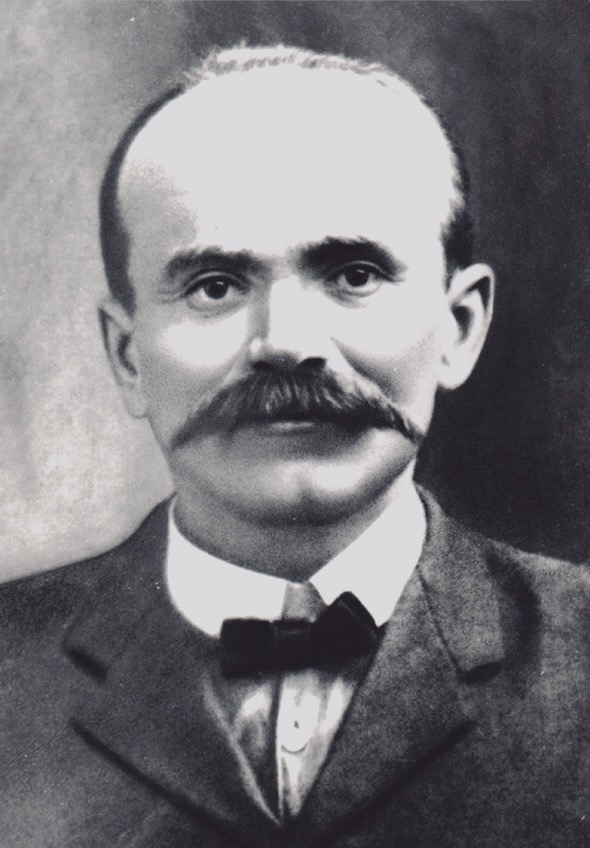
- Petro Nini Luarasi
- Born: 22 April 1865; Luaras, Albania, then Ottoman Empire
- Died: 17 August 1911 (aged 46); Ersekë, Albania, then Ottoman Empire
- Occupations: Writer, Teacher
- Writing career
- Notable works: Excommunication of Albanian letters The Defamation of the Albanian

Petro Nini Luarasi (born 22 April 1865 in Luaras, Kolonjë, Albania, then Ottoman Empire, and died on 17 August 1911 in Ersekë, Kolonjë, Albania, then Ottoman Empire) was an Albanian rilindas activist, teacher and journalist. His father, Nini Petro Kostallari, had also been active in the Albanian National Revival as a publicist and teacher.

== Life ==
Once that he finished the Qestorat seminary school under Koto Hoxhi, he worked as a teacher in the villages of Kolonjë District, where he taught Albanian in disguise and prepared a number of friends as future teachers of Albanian. In 1887 Luarasi and fellow teacher Thanas Sina took over the running of the Albanian school in Korçë from Pandeli Sotiri after his departure. Between 1887 and 1893 Luarasi opened in Ersekë and in some villages of the Kolonjë District Albanian language schools. Luarasi's founding and promotion of Albanian schools in the Kolonjë area brought him into conflict with Philaretos, the Greek archbishop of Kastoria. In 1892 a circular letter was sent to the Kolonjë Orthodox Albanian population to dissuade ties between them and Luarasi with Philaretos referring to him as a "damned renegade" spreading "free masonry and Protestantism", while condemning his work with Albanian schooling and stating that the Albanian language "did not exist".

Subsequently, he emigrated to the United States in the 1904–1908 period, where he was an active member of the Albanian National Movement and initiator of the patriotic associations Motherland Nostalgia (Albanian: Malli i Mëmëdheut) and The Pellasgian (Albanian: Pellazgu). Luarasi also worked as a director and teacher of the first Albanian School of the Qiriazi sisters in Korçë and in 1909–1911 he worked as a director of the Negovani school, which had been founded by Papa Kristo Negovani.

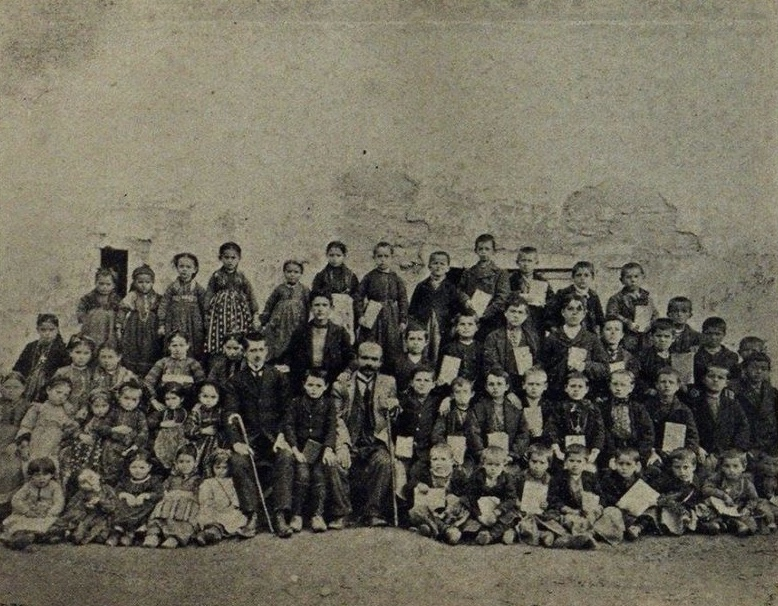
Albanian school of Flampouro (Negovan) in 1909. Petro Nini Luarasi (teacher) in the center

He also contributed to the organizations for the path that lead to the Declaration of Independence of Albania ( secession) from the Ottoman Empire.

Petro Nini Luarasi was one of the delegates of the Monastir Congress that sanctioned the creation of the Albanian alphabet in 1908. For his patriotic deeds, secession of Albania from the Ottoman Empire, teaching of the Albanian language and social activism he was persecuted both by the Ecumenical Patriarch of Constantinople and Young Turks regime. By many possibilities he died poisoned by the Patriarchane on 17 August 1911.

== Writing ==
He collaborated, published and was editor in chief with the following magazines:

- Nations's Union (Albanian: Bashkimi i kombit) (published in Monastir during the 1909–1910 period), where he was editor-in-chief;
- Drita, (published in Sofia, Bulgaria during the 1907–1908 period);
- The Nation, (Albanian: Kombi) published in Boston, in 1908;
- The Freedom (Albanian: Liria) published in Thessaloniki during the 1909–1910 period.

In these journals he published teaching, poetry and publicistic writings. In his political work Excommunication of the Albanian letters (Albanian: Mallkimi i shkronjave shqipe) and The Diffamation of the Albanian (Albanian: Çpërfolja e shqiptarit) (Manastir, 1911), he protected the rights of the Albanian people to their own national culture. He propagated the main ideas of the Albanian National Revival which were those of uniting the Albanian people in their fight for the freedom of Albania, no matter the religious beliefs.

== Recognition ==
Petro Nini Luarasi has been awarded by the Albanian Government the title People's Teacher of Albania. A high school bears his name in Tirana, Albania. On 13 January 2012 the President of Albania, Bamir Topi decorate Luarasi after death Honor of Nation Order of Albania.

== Work titles ==
- Articles in Drita, Sofje, 1907–1908, as editor-in-chief of the paper;
- Excommunication of the Albanian letters (Albanian: Mallkimi i shkronjave shqipe) Manastir, 1911;
- The Diffamation of the Albanian (Albanian: Çpërfolja e shqiptarit) Manastir, 1911.

== Sources ==
- Lloshi, Xhevat (2008). Rreth Alfabetit te Shqipes [Around the Albanian Alphabet]. Logos. ISBN 9789989582684.
- City of Erseka official website
