= Thimi Mitko =

Albanian folklorist and writer

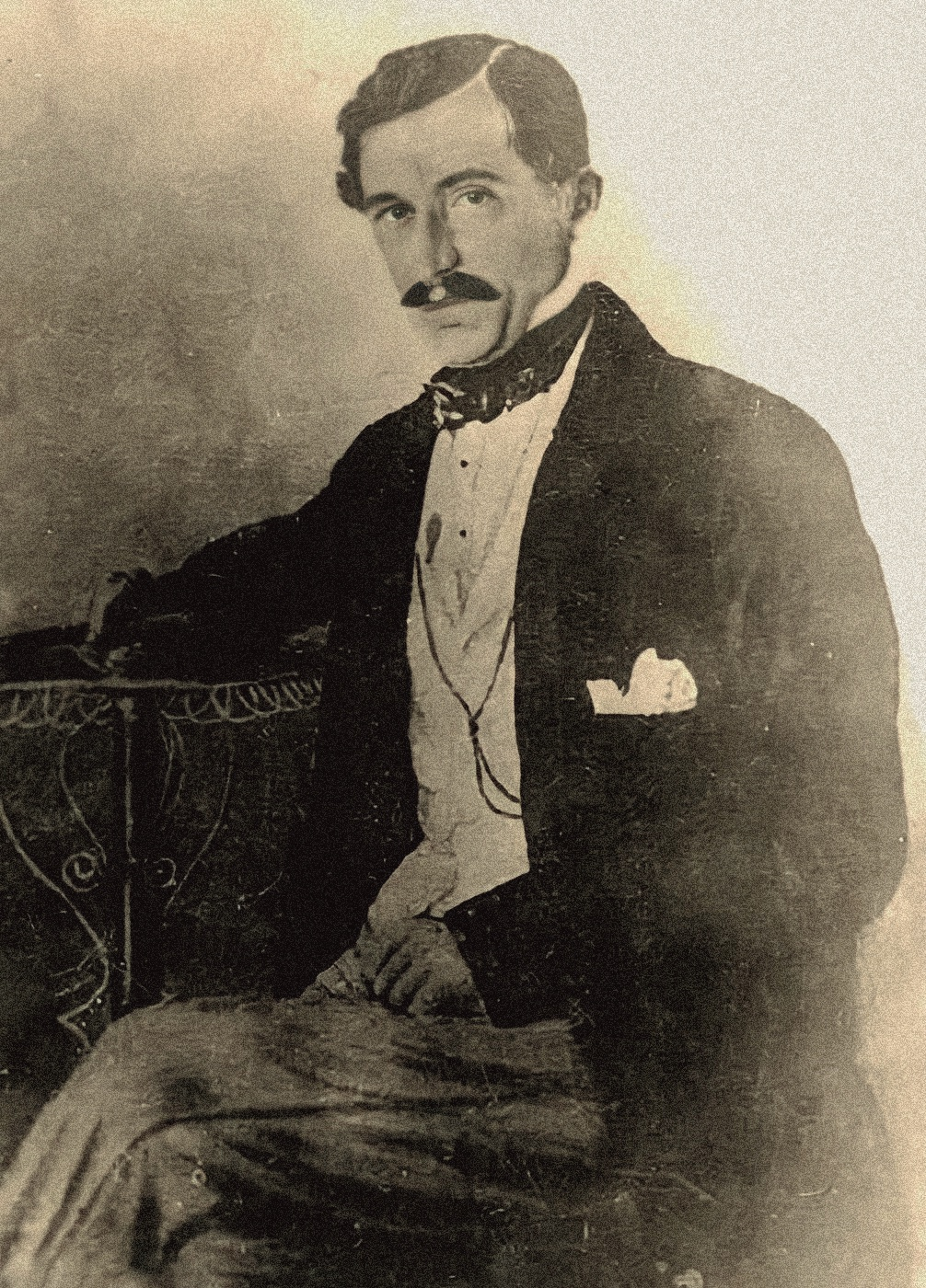
- Portrait of Thimi Mitko
- Born: Euthimio Mitko; 1820; Korçë, Ottoman Empire (modern day Albania)
- Died: 22 March 1890 (aged 69); Beni Suef, Ottoman Empire (modern day Egypt)
- Occupations: Folklorist; collector; rilindas; writer
- Relatives: Peti Mitko (Uncle)
- Writing career
- Language: Albanian
- Movement: Albanian Renaissance

Thimi (Euthimio) Mitko (1820 – March 22, 1890) was an activist of the Albanian National Awakening and folklorist.

Mitko was born in Korçë, Albania (then Ottoman Empire), where he attended the local Greek school. His uncle, Peti Mitko, had been one of the leaders of the Albanian Revolt of 1847 in Korçë and Tepelenë against the Turkish Tanzimat legislation. Both left Albania in 1850, moving first to Athens, Greece, then to Plovdiv, Bulgaria and finally to Vienna, Austria, where Thimi Mitko worked as a tailor. In 1866, he emigrated to Egypt, devoting himself to the Albanian nationalist movement and setting up a successful trading business in Beni Suef where he died on 1890.

Mitko collected Albanian folklore material from 1866. He corresponded with Italian prime minister Francesco Crispi, Jeronim De Rada, Dhimitër Kamarda, Dora d'Istria, Jan Urban Jarník, Kostandin Kristoforidhi, and Gustav Meyer, providing Kamarda with folksongs, riddles and tales for the latter's collection.

Mitko's own collection of Albanian folklore, consisting of folk songs, tales and popular sayings from southern Albania was published in the Greek-Albanian journal Alvaniki melissa (Belietta Sskiypetare) (The Albanian Bee) Alexandria, Egypt on 1878. According to Mitko, the collection was meant to provide Egypt's flourishing Albanian community with information about Albanian origins, customs and character. He maintained that the heroic songs collected by him showed that Albanians had a love of country and their fellow countrymen of different religions by keeping the memory alive of history and events through songs. Mitko also encouraged Albanians to study their mother tongue, as he viewed it as "the first and common food reviving the people". De Rada noted of the time that copies of Mitko's Albanian Bee had been burned in Greece. The work was reedited by Gjergj Pekmezi in Vienna in 1924 under the title Bleta shqypëtare e Thimi Mitkos.

== Albanian question ==
Mitko was also the author of numerous articles in European periodicals in support of the Albanian cause. He also wrote articles in the Greek magazine Pandora. In Cairo for a short time during 1901, Mitko contributed with works that were pro-Greek to the Albanian newspaper Bashkimi i Shqiptarëvet (Union of the Albanians) and later wrote in Faik Konica's periodical Albania.

Mitko supported an Albanian-Greek union within a confederation as a dual kingdom like Austria-Hungary provided it had a guarantee of Albania's "natural frontiers", as an independent Albania for him seemed too weak to oppose the Ottoman Empire. He however viewed that scenario a distant prospect as Greeks would not give up claims to Yanina and Preveza, while Mitko thought a loss by Albania of Yanina in such a framework was "an incurable wound". He viewed Greek claims to Epirus and Yanina as "pedantic and imaginary" and held that Greeks of Yanina were hellenised Albanians speaking an acquired learned Greek. Mitko in one of his works claimed that the majority of the Albanian people supported the idea that they should remain part of the Ottoman Empire, while a small number of Christians desired union with Greece. Later Mitko expressed views in the Italo-Albanian periodical Fiamuri Arbërit (Flag of Albania) that he supported the policy of the Ottoman Empire being against common enemies shared by Albanians.

== See also ==
- Albanians in Egypt
