= Vithkuq =

- Administrative unit
- Location within Albania
- Coordinates: 40°31′N 20°35′E
- Country: Albania
- County: Korçë
- Municipality: Korçë

Population (2011)
  - Administrative unit: 1,519
- Time zone: UTC+1 (CET)
  - Summer (DST): UTC+2 (CEST)
- Postal Code: 7025
- Area Code: (0)864

Vithkuq (Albanian pronunciation: [viθˈkuc]) is a village and a former municipality in the Korçë County, southeastern Albania. At the 2015 local government reform it became a subdivision of the municipality Korçë. The population at the 2011 census was 1,519. The municipal unit consists of the villages Vithkuq, Leshnje, Gjanc, Lubonjë, Rehovë, Roshanj, Trebickë, Grabockë, Treskë, Stratobërdh, Panarit, Shtyllë and Cemericë.

The village gave its name to a particular Albanian alphabetic script, the Vithkuqi script.

== Name ==
The place name Vithkuqi (older variant Bythkuqi) means "red butt" in Albanian. It is a compound of two Albanian words: bythë and vithë are dialectal forms of the word "butt"; kuqi means "red".

== History ==
The history of Vithkuqi is known immediately after the fall of Constantinople, although other data about the village existed also before that event. The first reference about this settlement dates back to the Byzantine period. According to the tradition the first church in Vithkuqi, dedicated to St. Athanasios, dates from the year 1162. An account of the teacher from Moscopole, Skenderis, which reports that Vithkuq was built before Moschopolis, implies a construction before the year 1330. Thimi Mitko recorded on a 19th century report about Korça for the French consul of Thessaloniki that Vithkuq had 8 thousand inhabitants at the time of the fall of Constantinople.

Vithkuq was one of the seven villages located in the Korçë area that the Ottoman Albanian lord Ilias Bey Mirahori received in 1484 from the Sultan Bayezid II, as a reward for being the first equerry and conqueror of Psamathia in the Ottoman capture of Constantinople. Vithkuq along with Leshja were accorded to Ilias Bey as mülk (land tenure). However he met difficulties while collecting the incomes and after twelve years these villages turned into their earlier status of timars. Being subjected to the Kaza of Korça, the villages of Episkopi, Boboshtica, Leshnja and Vithkuq were used in 1505 as sources of income on behalf of the five institutions of Ilias Bey's vakfa.

During the 17th-18th centuries Vithkuq became a local center of culture and trade, being on a strategic location on the Berat-Korçë road. In 1724 the residents of Vithkuq sponsored the foundation of the first Greek school in Korçë. As Ottoman authorities did not allow education in Albanian, Orthodox Albanians, including those of Vithkuq, sent their children to Greek language schools. In the eighteenth century, Vithkuq was inhabited by Orthodox Albanians and by smaller numbers of Aromanians (Vlachs).

From the end of 18th century, various factors turned Vithkuq into a small mountain village. By the late eighteenth century socio-political and economic crises alongside nominal Ottoman government control resulted in local banditry and Muslim Albanian bands raided Greek, Aromanian and Orthodox Albanian settlements located today within and outside contemporary Albania. Vithkuq, mainly an Orthodox Albanian centre that had Greek literary, educational and religious culture was destroyed in addition to other settlements in the region. Those events pushed some Orthodox Albanians and Aromanians from Vithkuq to migrate afar to places such as Macedonia, Thrace and so on. Only a small number of poor families remained, among them the Bredhi, whose descendant Naum Bredhi (Veqilharxhi) would become the first figure of the Albanian National Awakening.

In 1792, Vithkuq was composed of the following neighborhoods: Borisha, Tataçi, Llas, Qyrsa, Syrbashi, Krekasi, Palasi, Kolaqerkasi, Kovaçasi, Saraçi, Rusasi, Dukasi. Vithkuq hosts several churches and monasteries that were built during its period of prosperity.

In 1936, in Vithkuq was constructed the first hydroelectric plant of Albania.

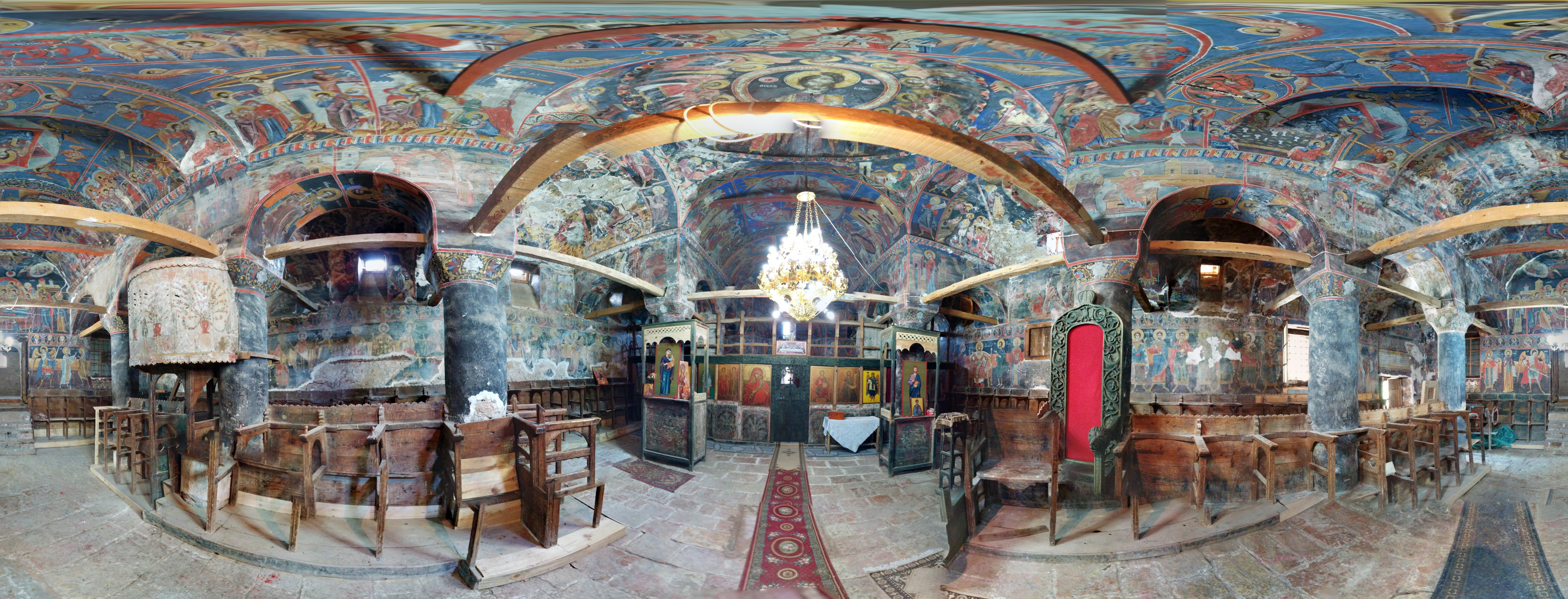
Panorama of Interior of the Church of Archangel Michael

=== World War II ===
On August 15, 1943, during World War II, the first storm brigade of the Albanian National Liberation Army was formed near Vithkuq under the command of Mehmet Shehu. Around 800 partisans took part in the following parade, which was attended by important members of the Albanian Communist party like Enver Hoxha and Mehmet Shehu.

=== Contemporary times ===
In contemporary times Vithkuq is inhabited by Orthodox Albanians and an Aromanian population who were previously pastoral nomads that settled there after the settlement was abandoned by its earlier inhabitants. as well as Muslim Albanians who have settled in it during communist times. Vithkuq, known in Albania as being a traditionally Christian settlement is neighbours with various Muslim and Christian Albanian villages that surround it, although the latter have become "demographically depressed", due to migration. During the communist period some Muslim Albanians from surrounding villages settled in Vithkuq making locals view the village population as mixed (i përzier) and lamenting the decline of the Christian element. From a cultural perspective, Vithkuq is part of the Kolonjë ethnographic region.

== Notable people ==
- Naum Veqilharxhi, rilindas, lawyer and writer. He named the Albanian script he invented after Vithkuq.
- Spiro Dine, rilindas and writer.
- Jan Evstrat Vithkuqari, scholar and writer.
- Saint Nicodemus of Elbasan, Orthodox New Martyr.
- Ligor Buzi, Fascist leader and journalist from the village of Lubonjë

== Bibliography ==
- Everson, Michael (2020), Proposal for encoding the Vithkuqi script in the SMP of the UCS (PDF), University of California, Berkeley
- Rembeci, Andi; Cunga, Sokol (2019). "Vithkuq of Moschopolis: the cradle of the early inhabitants of Kozani, according to oral tradition". In Hariton Karanasios; Vasiliki Diafa-Kampouridou (eds.). Η Κοζάνη και η περιοχή της από τους Βυζαντινούς στους Νεότερους Χρόνους [Kozani and its area from the Byzantines to the Modern Times]. Kozani: Εταιρεία Δυτικομακεδονικών Μελετών [Society for Western Macedonian Studies]. pp. 103–132.
