= Vithkuqi (Unicode block) =

- Range: U+10570..U+105BF (80 code points)
- Plane: SMP
- Scripts: Vithkuqi
- Assigned: 70 code points
- Unused: 10 reserved code points

Unicode Version History
- 14.0 (2021): 70 (+70)

Unicode documentation
- Code chart ∣ Web page

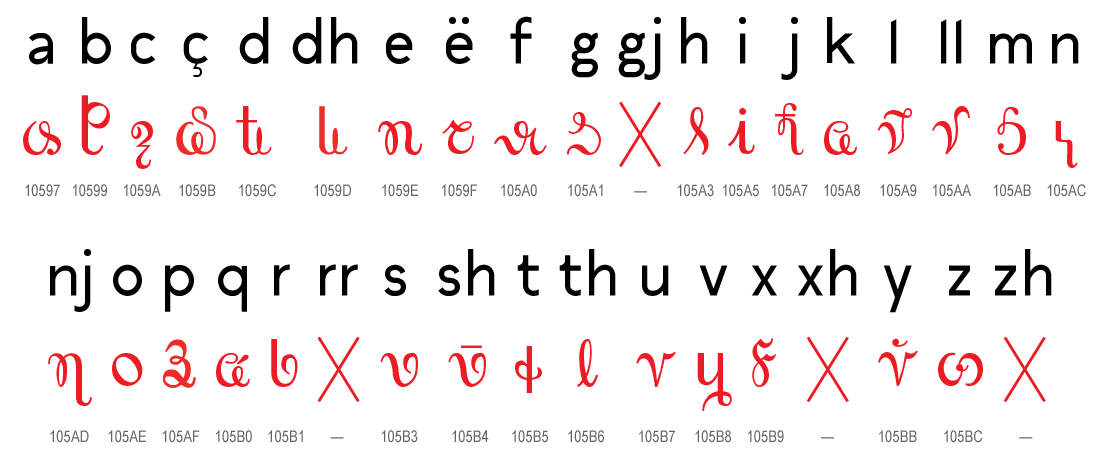
Unicode 10570-105BF Vithkuqi.

Vithkuqi is a Unicode block containing characters for Naum Veqilharxhi's script for writing Albanian.

Vithkuqi^{[1]}^{[2]} Official Unicode Consortium code chart (PDF)
| | 0 | 1 | 2 | 3 | 4 | 5 | 6 | 7 | 8 | 9 | A | B | C | D | E | F |
| U+1057x | 𐕰 | 𐕱 | 𐕲 | 𐕳 | 𐕴 | 𐕵 | 𐕶 | 𐕷 | 𐕸 | 𐕹 | 𐕺 | | 𐕼 | 𐕽 | 𐕾 | 𐕿 |
| U+1058x | 𐖀 | 𐖁 | 𐖂 | 𐖃 | 𐖄 | 𐖅 | 𐖆 | 𐖇 | 𐖈 | 𐖉 | 𐖊 | | 𐖌 | 𐖍 | 𐖎 | 𐖏 |
| U+1059x | 𐖐 | 𐖑 | 𐖒 | | 𐖔 | 𐖕 | | 𐖗 | 𐖘 | 𐖙 | 𐖚 | 𐖛 | 𐖜 | 𐖝 | 𐖞 | 𐖟 |
| U+105Ax | 𐖠 | 𐖡 | | 𐖣 | 𐖤 | 𐖥 | 𐖦 | 𐖧 | 𐖨 | 𐖩 | 𐖪 | 𐖫 | 𐖬 | 𐖭 | 𐖮 | 𐖯 |
| U+105Bx | 𐖰 | 𐖱 | | 𐖳 | 𐖴 | 𐖵 | 𐖶 | 𐖷 | 𐖸 | 𐖹 | | 𐖻 | 𐖼 | | | |
Notes 1.As of Unicode version 17.0 2.Grey areas indicate non-assigned code points

== History ==
The following Unicode-related documents record the purpose and process of defining specific characters in the Vithkuqi block:

| Version | Final code points (Note: Proposed code points and characters names may differ from final code points and names) | Count | L2 ID | WG2 ID | Document |
|---|---|---|---|---|---|
| 14.0 | U+10570..1057A, 1057C..1058A, 1058C..10592, 10594..10595, 10597..105A1, 105A3..105B1, 105B3..105B9, 105BB..105BC | 70 | L2/09-328 | | Anderson, Deborah; Glavy, Jason (2009-11-30), Old Albanian Scripts |
| 14.0 | U+10570..1057A, 1057C..1058A, 1058C..10592, 10594..10595, 10597..105A1, 105A3..105B1, 105B3..105B9, 105BB..105BC | 70 | L2/17-316 | N4854 | Everson, Michael (2017-09-08), Preliminary proposal for encoding the Vithkuqi script |
| 14.0 | U+10570..1057A, 1057C..1058A, 1058C..10592, 10594..10595, 10597..105A1, 105A3..105B1, 105B3..105B9, 105BB..105BC | 70 | L2/17-384 | | Anderson, Deborah; Whistler, Ken; Pournader, Roozbeh; Moore, Lisa; Liang, Hai (2017-10-22), "3. Vithkuqi", Recommendations to UTC #153 October 2017 on Script Proposals |
| 14.0 | U+10570..1057A, 1057C..1058A, 1058C..10592, 10594..10595, 10597..105A1, 105A3..105B1, 105B3..105B9, 105BB..105BC | 70 | L2/20-169 | | Anderson, Deborah; Whistler, Ken; Pournader, Roozbeh; Moore, Lisa; Constable, Peter; Liang, Hai (2020-07-21), "5. Vithkuqi", Recommendations to UTC #164 July 2020 on Script Proposals |
| 14.0 | U+10570..1057A, 1057C..1058A, 1058C..10592, 10594..10595, 10597..105A1, 105A3..105B1, 105B3..105B9, 105BB..105BC | 70 | L2/20-250 | | Anderson, Deborah; Whistler, Ken; Pournader, Roozbeh; Moore, Lisa; Constable, Peter; Liang, Hai (2020-10-01), "3. Vithkuqi", Recommendations to UTC #165 October 2020 on Script Proposals |
| 14.0 | U+10570..1057A, 1057C..1058A, 1058C..10592, 10594..10595, 10597..105A1, 105A3..105B1, 105B3..105B9, 105BB..105BC | 70 | L2/20-237 | | Moore, Lisa (2020-10-27), "B.1 (Section 3, Vithkuqi)", UTC #165 Minutes |
| 14.0 | U+10570..1057A, 1057C..1058A, 1058C..10592, 10594..10595, 10597..105A1, 105A3..105B1, 105B3..105B9, 105BB..105BC | 70 | L2/20-187R2 | N5138R2 | Everson, Michael (2020-12-07), Proposal for encoding the Vithkuqi script in the SMP |
| 14.0 | U+10570..1057A, 1057C..1058A, 1058C..10592, 10594..10595, 10597..105A1, 105A3..105B1, 105B3..105B9, 105BB..105BC | 70 | L2/21-016R | | Anderson, Deborah; Whistler, Ken; Pournader, Roozbeh; Moore, Lisa; Liang, Hai (2021-01-14), "5 Vithkuqi", Recommendations to UTC #166 January 2021 on Script Proposals |
| 14.0 | U+10570..1057A, 1057C..1058A, 1058C..10592, 10594..10595, 10597..105A1, 105A3..105B1, 105B3..105B9, 105BB..105BC | 70 | L2/21-009 | | Moore, Lisa (2021-01-27), "B.1 — 5", UTC #166 Minutes |
