= Naum Veqilharxhi =

Albanian inventor of writing system (1797–1846)

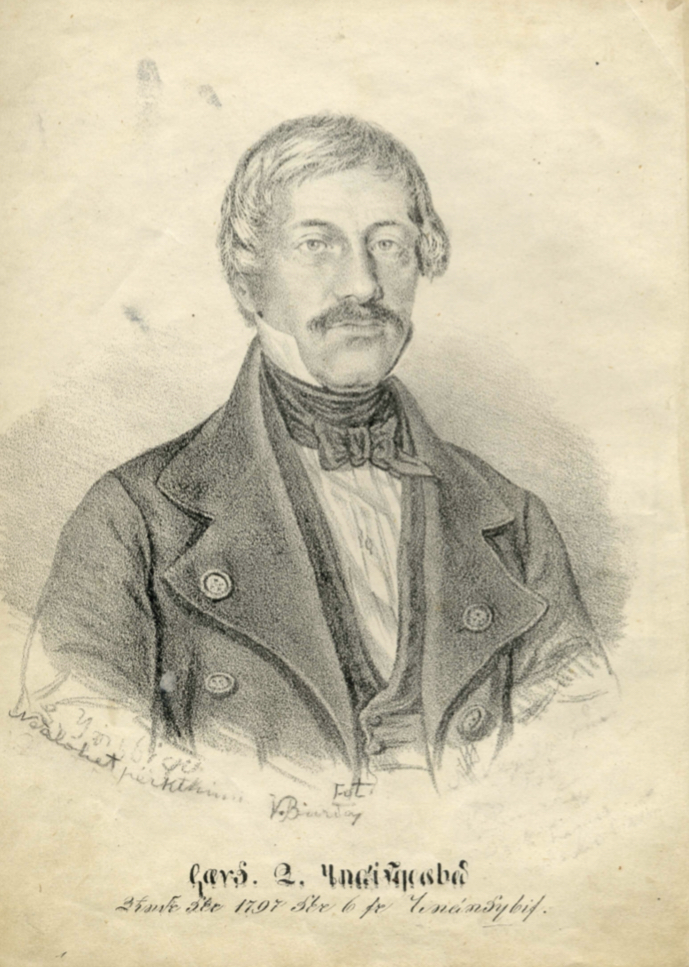
- Veqilharxhi in a c. 1844 illustration
- Born: Naum Panajot Bredhi; December 6, 1797; Vithkuq, Korçë, southern Albania, then Ottoman Empire
- Died: 1846 (Aged 57); Istanbul, Turkey, then Constantinople, Ottoman Empire
- Occupation: Lawyer
- Writing career
- Language: Albanian
- Notable work: Evëtor

Naum Veqilharxhi (born Naum Panajot Bredhi; 1797–1846) was an Albanian lawyer and scholar. In 1844, he published using a unique alphabet for the Albanian language with characters he had created himself, the Vithkuqi script. Veqilharxhi is one of the most prominent figures of the early Albanian National Awakening, and is considered by Albanians as its first ideologue.

== Life ==
=== Early life ===
Naum Veqilharxhi was born on 6 of December 1797 in the village of Vithkuq, near Korçë, southern Albania in an Orthodox Albanian family. His family inherited the name Veqilharxhi (Vekilharç lit. meaning steward) since his father Panajot Bredhi was a supplier to the court of Ali Pashë Tepelena, the ruler of the Pashalik of Janina. After the destruction of Vithkuq in 1819, he sought a better life in the Danubian Principalities. As a student he took part in the Wallachian uprising of 1821. A few years later he worked in Brăila as a lawyer, became wealthy and used his money to promote the ideas of the Albanian National Awakening. In Brăila he joined an intellectual organization of Albanians, who considered the development of Albanian language and culture necessary for the Albanian National Awakening.

=== Activism and works ===
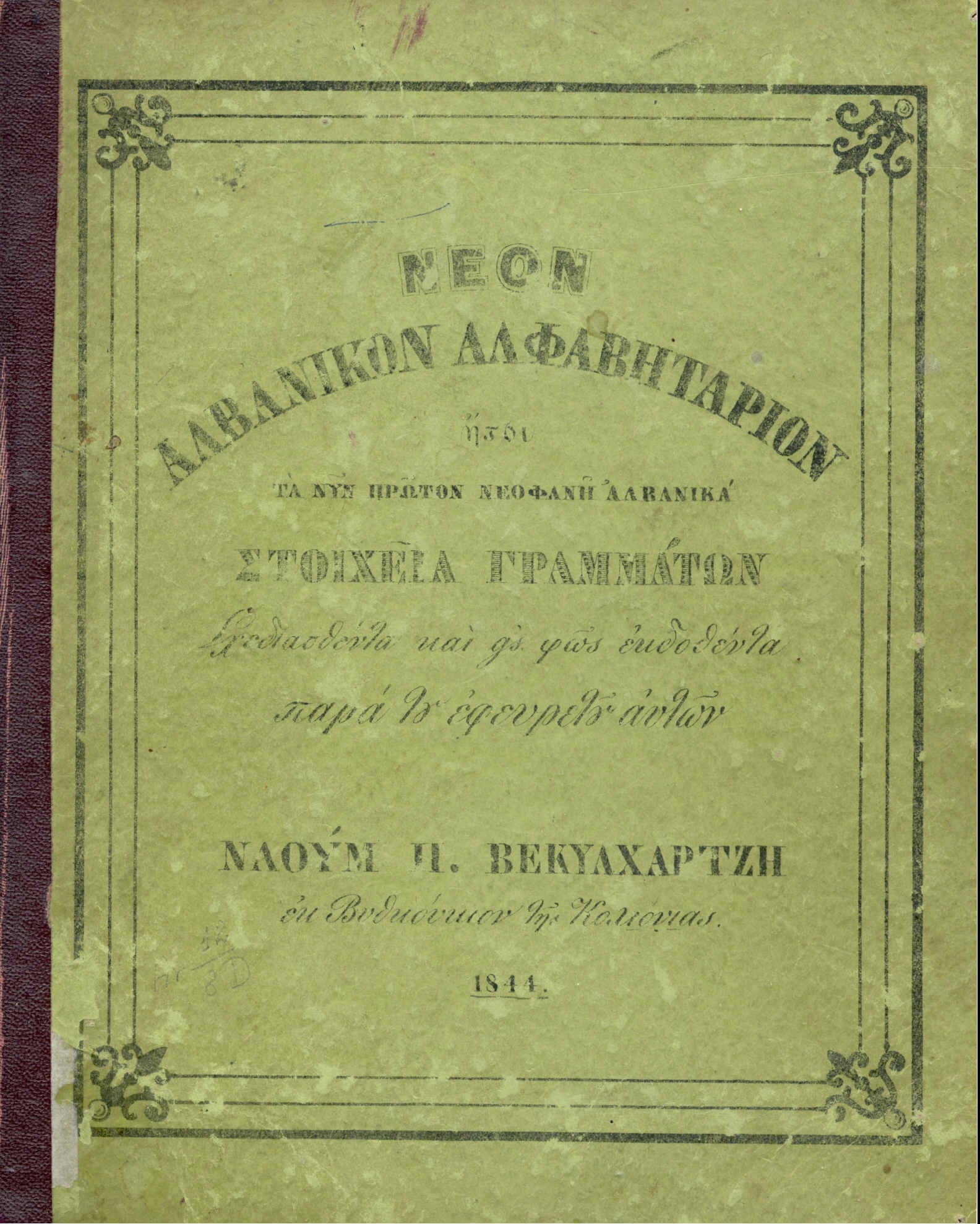
Abetare by Naum Veqilharxhi

In 1824 or 1825 he started the creation of his alphabet of the Albanian language. The final version of his thirty-three-letter Vithkuqi alphabet, whose characters were invented by Veqilharxhi, was printed as part of primer in 1844-5 titled Ëvetari Shqip Fort i Shkurtër ("The most Useful and Concise Albanian Alphabet"). Veqilharxhi avoided the use of Latin, Greek or Arabic alphabets and characters because of their religious associations and the possibility of causing divisions among Albanians of different religions. Veqilarxhi's Ëvetar first distributed in Korçë and later westwards as far as Berat, where it reached great success. It was also circulated in Përmet. On April 22, 1845 Athanas Paskali, one of the notable people of Korçë, along with others sent him a letter requesting as many more copies as possible. Among Albanian historians this publication by Veqilharxhi is considered as the beginning of the Albanian national awakening.

In 1845 Veqilharxhi sent a polemic open letter written in the Greek language to his nephew, who had called his patriotic ideas chimera: the letter is considered to be one of the first written documents to record the main ideas of the Albanian National Awakening movement. His death is thought to have been from poisoning by orders from the Ecumenical Patriarch of Constantinople. The cause of his death, and the date or place are unknown. It is believed that he died shortly after the summer of 1846, when the last information on him was published by the Wallachian media. In a testament from Brăila, already by 1849 he is mentioned as deceased.

== Ideas ==
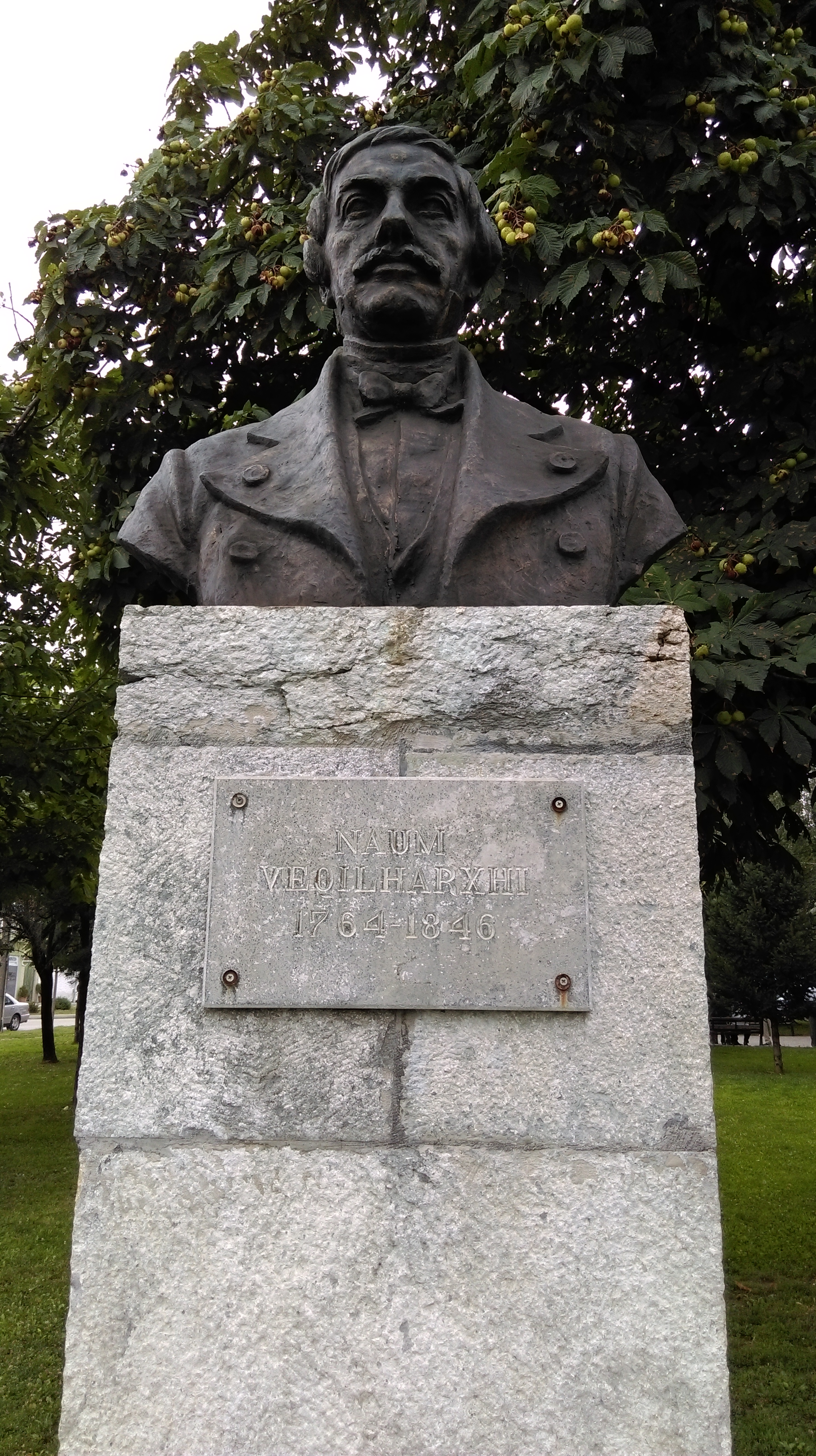
Bust of Naum Veqilharxhi, Korçë

Outside of his native land Veqilharxhi in Wallachia was a figure that thrived within the security of the Albanian diaspora where both worlds became linked together, a dynamic that led thereafter to the development of Albanianism by other Albanians.

Veqilharxhi lamented the "backwardness" of his homeland and attributed it to centuries of Ottoman rule, and argued that a new unifying Albanian alphabet was necessary to overcome the stagnation and unify the country. He was concerned by the lack of Albanian schools, and saw the development of written Albanian as a necessary precursor to cultural and political development. Veqilharxhi felt that education in one's mother tongue was important toward acquiring knowledge and "culture". In one preface written to Albanian schoolboys, he berates Albanian children who did "not know their own heritage; not only are they unable to write in their own language, they cannot even pray to the Lord in the language each of them tasted with his mother’s milk", and for learning only the languages of foreigners and not their own. He urged Albanian boys to study their own language in order to "join the civilized world, prove that our land is idle no longer and show ourselves as men of great honor", and compared the Albanian nation to a "larva" that may one day become a butterfly.

It has been argued that, in his formative earlier years, Veqilharxhi was influenced by Greek nationalism and was a member of the Filiki Eteria. In his later years, he warned that "Greek schools are organized to illuminate Greek youth and not to illuminate the Albanian people", and felt that native language education was necessary to prevent Hellenisation.

Veqilharxhi is considered to be the first written ideologue of Albanian nationalism and the first to formulate its ideals, as well as the first enlightener of the Albanian National Awakening. Attached to his Ëvetar was a primer addressed to Orthodox Albanians, which became the first programme document of the Albanian national movement.

Veqilharxhi conceived of Albania as a nation with its own language, customs and history, and its own territory. His conception of Albania included a harmony between the different faiths practiced by Albanians, with each faith being practiced by Albanians a little bit differently than it would be by non-Albanians, which would evolve into the Albanian national ideal of religious harmony. He also helped Albanian nationalism take its ultimate course of using language, rather than religion as other Balkan nationalisms did, as its primary unifier.

== The original alphabet he invented ==
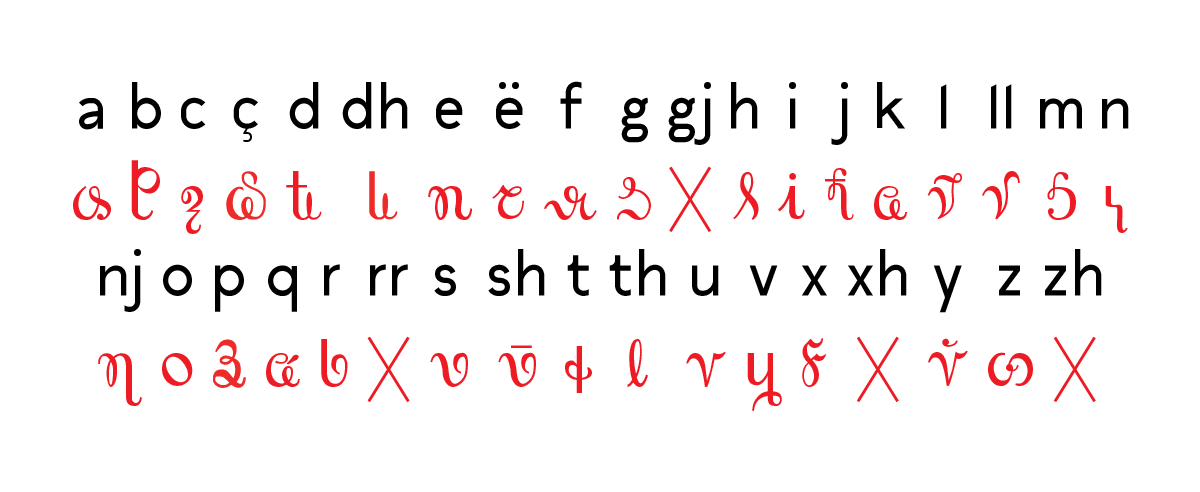
Letters from the original script of Veqilharxhi (red). The missing gj, rr, xh and zh are marked as X.

Veqilharxhi invented an original script for his Albanian primers. The script sometimes considered to be similar to the Armenian alphabet, was most probably developed sometime around 1825. The books by Veqilharxhi were lithographed in Bucharest by George Venrich, as was recently discovered. Though the script was lithographed, in 1847 it was also cut for typographic use in Vienna, by the Austrian philologists and punchcutter Alois Auer. The script by Veqilharxhi, is also known as Vithkuqi script, because of the place of birth of its author. It was briefly used in some parts of Albania, but never managed to become popularised.

This was not the first original script to be developed for the Albanian language. However, according to Robert Elsie it remains the first one to be printed, though only lithographed, as shown above. The typeface of Vithkuqi is the first known original Albanian script to by cut in type. It was briefly used by Carl Faulmann at the end of the 19th century. No instance of its usage by any Albanian author is known to date.

== See also ==
- Vithkuqi script
- Albanian alphabet
- Todhri script
- Elbasan script
- Theodhor Haxhifilipi
- Gregory of Durrës
