= Vithkuq Hydroelectric Power Station =

Hydroelectric power station in Albania

- Country: Albania
- Location: Vithkuq, Korçë, Albania
- Coordinates: 40°31′49″N 20°34′55″E
- Status: Operational
- Commission date: 1936; 90 years ago
- Owner: "Favina 1" Ltd. company

Thermal power station
- Turbine technology: Hydroelectric

Power generation
- Units operational: 1
- Nameplate capacity: 500 KW

The Vithkuq Hydroelectric Power Station (Albanian: Hidrocentrali i Vithkuqit) is a small hydroelectric power station in Vithkuq, Albania. Constructed in 1936, it was the first hydroelectric plant in Albania with an installed capacity of 500 KW.

== See also ==
- List of power stations in Albania
- Vithkuq
