= Albanian National Awakening =

19th- and 20th-century revival of Albanian culture

The Albanian National Awakening (Albanian: Rilindja or Rilindja Kombëtare), commonly known as the Albanian Renaissance or Albanian Revival, is a period throughout the 19th and 20th centuries, concerning a cultural, political, and social movement in Albanian history where the Albanian people gathered strength to establish an independent cultural and political life, as well as the country of Albania.

Prior to the rise of nationalism, Albania remained under the rule of the Ottoman Empire for almost five centuries and the Ottoman authorities suppressed any expression of national unity or institutional national conscience by the Albanian people. There is some debate among experts regarding when the Albanian nationalist movement should be considered to have started. Some sources attribute its origins to the revolts against centralisation in the 1830s, others to the publication of the first attempt by Naum Veqilharxhi at a standardized alphabet for Albanian in 1844, or to the collapse of the League of Prizren during the Eastern Crisis in 1881. Various compromise positions between these three theses have also emerged, such as one view positing that Albanian nationalism had foundations that dated earlier but "consolidated" as a movement during the Great Eastern Crisis (1876–1881).

Another view is that Albanian nationalism's roots "sprouted" in the reforms of the first decades of the 19th century, and that Albanian nationalism emerged properly in the 1830s and 1840s, when it was a romantic movement for societal reform that was initially mainly driven by Albanians publishing from abroad; it transformed into an overt political national movement in the 1870s. On 20 December 1912, the Conference of Ambassadors in London recognized an independent Albania within its present-day borders.

== Background ==
=== Albanian Pashaliks ===
When the central authority of the Ottoman Empire and the timar system weakened, anarchy emerged in the Albanian-populated region of the empire, and in the late 18th century, two Albanian centers of power arose: the Pashalik of Shkodra under the Bushati family; and the Pashalik of Yanina under Ali Pasha of Tepelenë. Both cooperated with and defied the Sublime Porte as their interests required. The Albanian people (both Muslim and Christian) had a great influence in the politics and events of the late 18th century and early 19th century Ottoman Empire, and in particular they played a key role in the Greek War of Independence, on both sides of the war. Pursuing their own interests, they acted after their own agenda, regardless of the Porte's demands.

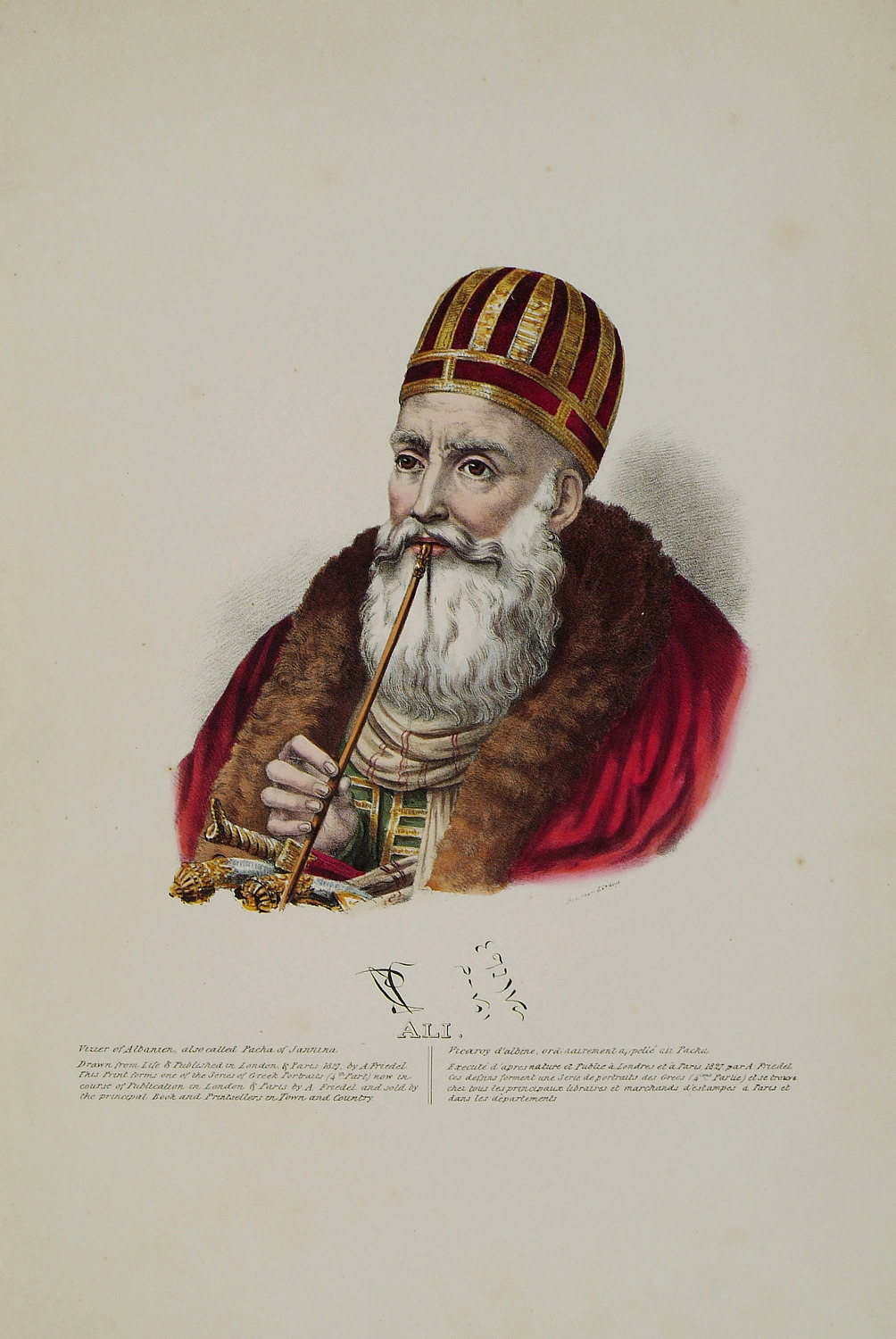
Ali, Vizier of Albania, also called Pacha of Jannina by Adam Friedel, drawn from life and published in 1828.

The rulers of the increasingly independent Albanian Pashaliks were Albanian military leaders who were at first awarded for their loyalty to the Ottoman Empire, and who however exploited the weakness of the Sublime Porte to exercise in northern and southern Albania their gathered military and political power. While they are clearly not described as champions of national fight aiming at an independent and united Albania, but regarded as political opportunists within the context of the Ottomam Empire, nevertheless these Albanian rulers established separate states by challenging the authority of the Sublime Porte, and Ali Pasha of Yanina, in particular, also established foreign diplomatic relations with Napoleonic France and with Britain. British travellers who had met Ali Pasha noted that Ali described himself and the Albanians as friends of the British nation. Furthermore, Albanians were seen as living independently and without oppression by the Porte, meanwhile Ali Pasha was aiming to form some kind of alliance with the British government. Ali's separatist initiative, by conceiving his territory in increasingly independent terms referring to it as "Albania", eventually aiming at creating an independent Albanian–Greek state, revealed the vulnerability of Ottoman power. The Albanian rule of the Pashalik of Yanina as well as that of the Pashalik of Scutari caused the emergence of a sense of ethnic belonging among the Albanian people, which consequently led to an enduring hostility of Albanians against the Sublime Porte, also by seeking autonomy from its central power.

=== 1831–1878 ===
After the fall of the Yanina Pashalik, the power and influence of the Albanian beys had faded. The remaining beys thus attempted to restore their rule. An assembly was held in Berat in 1828. In this Convention, the leaders were Zylyftar Poda and Shahin bej Delvina. The Ottoman Empire tried to prevent the rise of local beys, which presented a menace to centralised power. In 1830, the Sublime Porte sent an expeditionary force under the command of Reşid Mehmed Pasha to suppress the local Albanian beys. On hearing the news of the Ottoman forces' arrival, the three most powerful local chiefs, Zylyftar Poda, accompanied by the remains of Ali Pasha's faction, Veli Bey (whose power base was around Yannina), and Arslan Bey, along with other less powerful beys, began to prepare their forces to resist a probable Ottoman attack. Realising the seriousness of the situation and the danger of a general uprising, Reşid Mehmed Pasha invited the Albanian beys to a meeting on the pretext that they would be rewarded for their loyalty to the Porte. The beys however, were all killed along with their guards.

The last Albanian pashalik to fall was the Scutari Pashalik. The Bushati dynasty rule ended when an Ottoman army under Mehmed Reshid Pasha besieged the Rozafa Castle and forced Mustafa Reshiti to surrender (1831). The Albanian defeat ended a planned alliance between the Albanian beys and the Bosnian nobility, who were similarly seeking autonomy. Instead of the pashalik, the vilayets of Scutari and that of Kosovo were created.

=== Early revolts ===
By removing the Timar system, the Sublime Porte intended to strengthen its central government and reclaim the power of the Empire which had been severely weakened due to economic and social backwardness, from the exploitative system and from the ongoing uprisings of peoples. Reforms began to be implemented in Albania since the 1830s. They gave a blow to the ranks of the old military feudal class which had been weakened from Ottoman expeditions from 1822 to 1831. Parts of the feudal heads that had launched revolts were eliminated, others were exiled and those who could, had escaped from the country. All their properties were declared state-owned. This gave rise to new landowners who had connections to the Sublime Porte. Due to the Ottoman occupation, the ideology of Nationalism developed with difficulty and was limited in Albanian-inhabited territories in the Balkan. They found more favorable development conditions outside, in the capital of the Empire, Istanbul, Italy, other Balkan countries etc. The national ideas became apparent via popular uprisings against the Tanzimat reforms, but they still did not reach a period to be formulated in full policy of the National Movement. They were more expressed with literary works and studies of the Albanian people, history, language and culture. In their writings, the Rilindas fought to invoke feelings of love for the country by exalting patriotic traditions and episodes of history, especially that of the Skanderbeg era and folk culture; They devoted a lot of attention to native language and Albanian schools as a means to affirm individuality and national vindication.

The centralising reforms of the Ottoman government were implemented immediately with the deployment of civil and military personnel in Albania. This was met with resistance by the local population which first began with the refusal to execute orders and quickly transformed into armed rebellion. After two local uprisings that burst in the beginning of 1833 in Kolonjë and in Dibër were repressed, uprisings occurred in Berat-Vlorë-Delvinë-Çamëria area in larger scales than before. The actions of the Ottoman army were driven by terror and increased unhappiness in the local population, who were aptly anticipated to revolt again. Fugitive agitators circulated across the provinces to organise further rebellions, calling on the people to prepare for war. Others were sent to neighbouring provinces to secure their presence by pointing out they are "brothers." To get ahead of the danger Of the new outbreak of popular hate, at the beginning of 1844, the Ottoman authorities urged urgent action. They concentrated large military forces at various points, especially in Bitola where the state was worse. By the end of March 1844, the new uprising erupted but was suppressed.

In the ensuing years there were bursts of armed insurrections throughout Albania against the Ottoman centralising reforms, and especially against the burden of the new taxes imposed and against the obligatory military service. But, at the same time and within the bosom of these insurrections, preliminary national claims started to spread. These claims came forth especially in the revolt of 1847, which assumed great proportions in two zones of Southern Albania: in the Gjirokastra region led by Zenel Gjoleka and in that of Berat led by Rapo Hekali.

== The movement ==
=== Formation ===
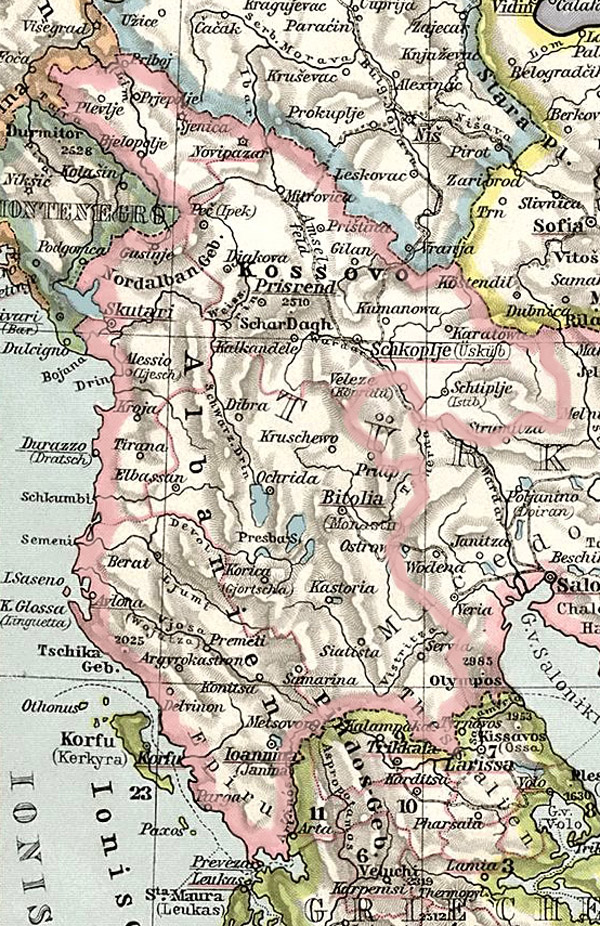
The 4 Ottoman vilayets (Kosovo, Scutari, Monastir and Janina), proposed as Albanian vilayet, by the League of Prizren 1878.

There is some debate among experts regarding when the Albanian nationalist movement should be considered to have started. Some sources attribute its origins to the revolts against centralization in the 1830s, others to the publication of the first attempt by Naum Veqilharxhi at a standardized alphabet for Albanian in 1844, or to the collapse of the League of Prizren during the Eastern Crisis in 1881. Various compromise positions between these three theses have also emerged, such as one view positing that Albanian nationalism had foundations that dated earlier but "consolidated" as a movement during the Eastern Crisis (1878–1881). Another view is that Albanian nationalism's roots "sprouted" in the reforms of the first decades of the 19th century but Albanian nationalism emerged properly in the 1830s and 1840s as a romantic movement for societal reform that was initially mainly driven by Albanians publishing from a broad, and it transformed into an overt political national movement in the 1870s. According to the view that the Rilindja evolved in the 1870s, because of religious ties of the Albanian majority of the population with the ruling Ottomans and the lack of an Albanian state in past, nationalism was less developed and the national movement was greatly delayed among Albanians in the 19th century compared to neighbouring southeast European nations, such as the Greeks, Serbs, Bulgarians and Romanians. The Rilindja was a continuation of the Albanian revolts and cultural activities for independence that took place during the entire Ottoman period. The centralist Tanzimat reforms, which were aimed at replacing local Albanian functionaries and suppression of Albanian culture sowed the seeds of the Rilindja. In that period an intellectual and merchant class with the new ideas that were emerging in Europe was shaped, empowering the existing struggle against the Ottoman rule. Political nationalism and economic liberalism were two modern platforms that inspired many Albanian intellectuals.

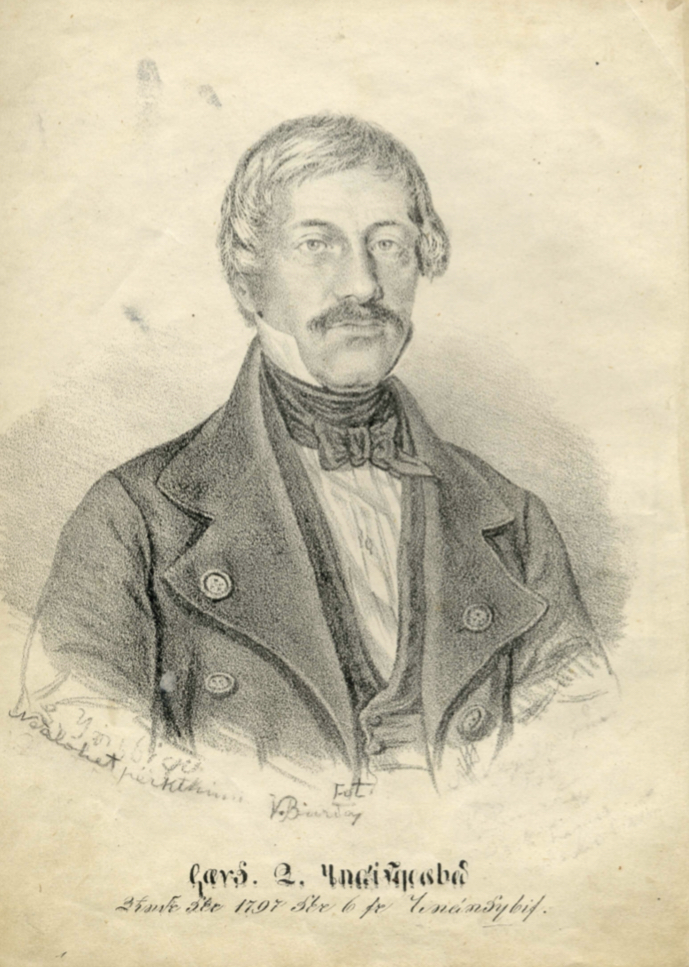
Naum Veqilharxhi in a c. 1844 illustration.

The French Revolution left a socio-economic impact on the Albanian society, with many Albanian intellectuals highlighting ideals of the Revolution and important figures such as Voltaire and Jean-Jacques Rousseau. During that time, the destruction of the Pashalik of Yanina and the growing Greek nationalist ambitions fueled reaction among the Albanian intellectual elite. The son of one merchant family, Naum Veqilharxhi, started his work to write an alphabet intended to help Albanians overcome religious and political issues in 1824 or 1825. Veqilharxhi thought that the continuous occupations had caused many problems to Albanian education. His work facilitated the diffusion of national awareness based on the unity of kin, identity of language and traditions. Some Albanian patriots, among them many from the Arbëreshë communities in Italy, built contacts with Italian democratic and revolutionary forces. This helped the Rilindja movement to expand beyond the frame of Albanian-Ottoman relations, and become an international issue. The Risorgimento actually served as an inspiration for the movement. The 1877–1878 Russo-Turkish War dealt a decisive blow to Ottoman power in the Balkan Peninsula. The Albanians' fear that the lands they inhabited would be partitioned among Montenegro, Serbia, Bulgaria, and Greece fueled the rise of the Albanian national movement.

The first postwar treaty, the abortive Treaty of San Stefano signed on March 3, 1878, assigned Albanian-populated lands to Serbia, Montenegro, and Bulgaria. Austria-Hungary and the United Kingdom blocked the arrangement because it awarded Russia a predominant position in the Balkans and thereby upset the European balance of power. A peace conference to settle the dispute was held later in the year in Berlin.

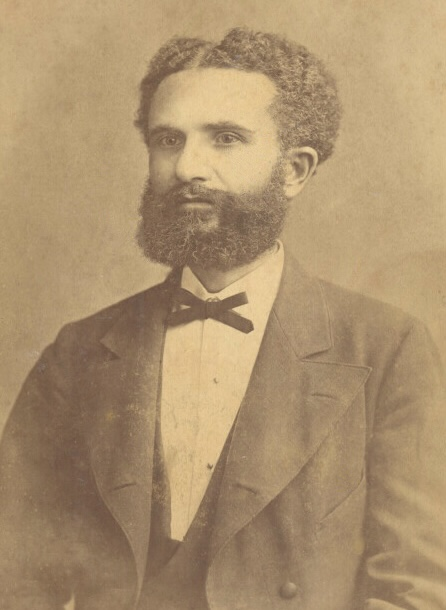
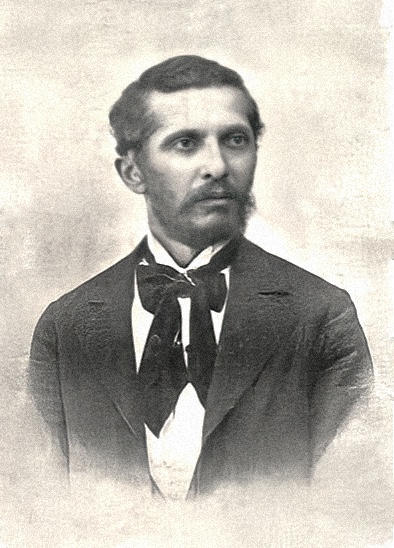
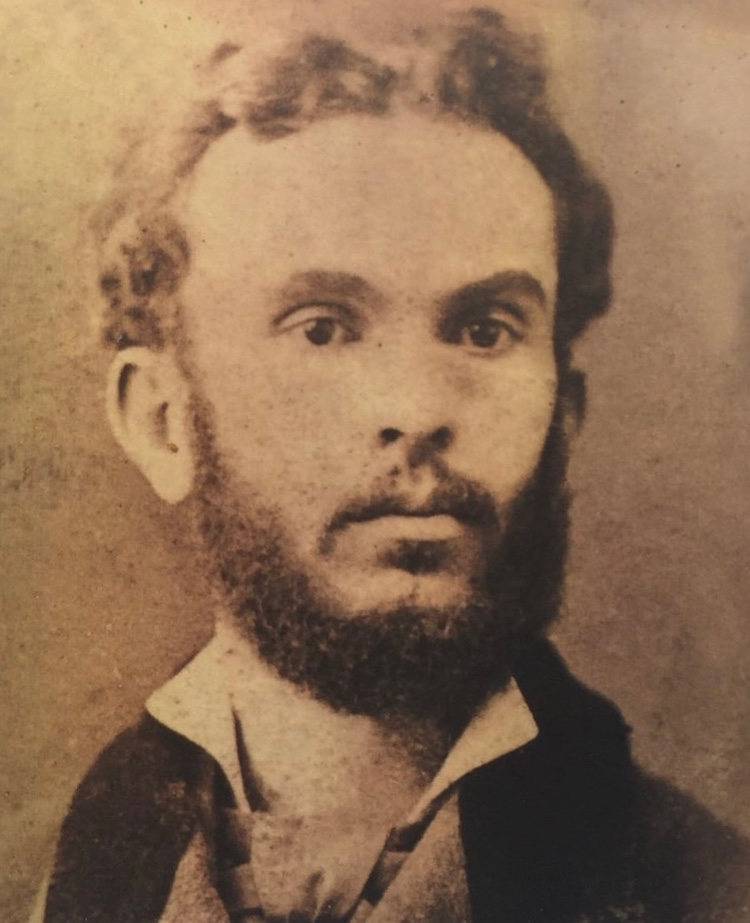
Frashëri brothers: Abdyl (left), Naim (center), Sami (right).

The Treaty of San Stefano triggered profound anxiety among the Albanians meanwhile, and it spurred their leaders to organize a defense of the lands they inhabited. In the spring of 1878, influential Albanians in Constantinople—including Abdyl Frashëri, one of the first political ideologues of the National Revival-organized a secret committee to direct the Albanians' resistance. In May the group called for a general meeting of representatives from all the Albanian-populated lands. On June 10, 1878, about eighty delegates, mostly Muslim religious leaders, clan chiefs, and other influential people from the four Albanian-populated Ottoman vilayets, met in Prizren. The delegates declared the formation of the League of Prizren which consisted of two branches: the Prizren branch and the southern branch. The Prizren branch was led by Iljas Dibra and it had representatives from the areas of Kirçova (Kicevo), Kalkandelen (Tetovo), Pristine (Pristina), Mitroviça (Mitrovica), Viçitirin (Vushtrri), Üsküp (Skopje), Gilan (Gjilan), Manastir (Bitola), Debar (Debar) and Gostivar. The southern branch, led by Abdyl Frashëri consisted of sixteen representatives from the areas of Kolonjë, Korçë, Arta, Berat, Parga, Gjirokastër, Përmet, Paramythia, Filiates, Margariti, Vlorë, Tepelenë and Delvinë. The League of Prizren was set under the direction of a central committee that had the power to impose taxes and raise an army. The League of Prizren worked to gain autonomy for the Albanians and to thwart implementation of the Treaty of San Stefano, but not to create an independent Albania. The participants wanted to return to the status quo before the start of Russo-Turkish War of 1877–1878. The main aim was to defend from immediate dangers. Among other things the League requested an official status for the Albanian language in the Albanian-inhabited territories and the foundation of Albanian schools.

At first the Ottoman authorities supported the League of Prizren, but the Sublime Porte pressed the delegates to declare themselves to be first and foremost Ottomans rather than Albanians. Some delegates supported this position and advocated emphasizing Muslim solidarity and the defense of Muslim lands, including present-day Bosnia and Herzegovina. Other representatives, under Frashëri's leadership, focused on working toward Albanian autonomy and creating a sense of Albanian identity that would cut across religious and tribal lines. Because conservative Muslims constituted a majority of the representatives, the League of Prizren supported maintenance of Ottoman suzerainty.

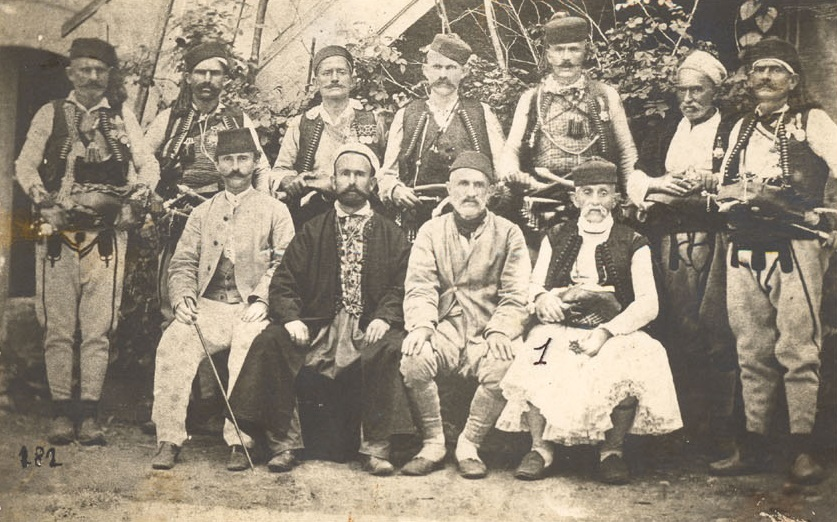
League of Prizren, group photo, 1878

In July 1878, the league sent a memorandum to the Great Powers at the Congress of Berlin, which was called to settle the unresolved problems of Turkish War, demanding that all Albanians be united in a single autonomous Ottoman province. The Congress of Berlin ignored the league's memorandum. The congress ceded to Montenegro the cities of Bar and Podgorica and areas around the mountain towns of Gusinje and Plav, which Albanian leaders considered Albanian territory. Serbia also gained some Albanian-inhabited lands. The Albanians, the vast majority loyal to the empire, vehemently opposed the territorial losses. Albanians also feared the possible occupation of Epirus by Greece. The League of Prizren organized armed resistance efforts in Gusinje, Plav, Scutari, Prizren, Preveza, and Ioannina. A border tribesman at the time described the frontier as "floating on blood."

In August 1878, the Congress of Berlin ordered a commission to trace a border between the Ottoman Empire and Montenegro. The congress also directed Greece and the Ottoman Empire to negotiate a solution to their border dispute. The Great Powers expected the Ottomans to ensure that the Albanians would respect the new borders, ignoring that the sultan's military forces were too weak to enforce any settlement and that the Ottomans could only benefit by the Albanians' resistance. The Sublime Porte, in fact, armed the Albanians and allowed them to levy taxes, and when the Ottoman army withdrew from areas awarded to Montenegro under the Treaty of Berlin, Roman Catholic Albanian tribesmen simply took control. The Albanians' successful resistance to the treaty forced the Great Powers to alter the border, returning Gusinje and Plav to the Ottoman Empire and granting Montenegro the Albanian-populated coastal town of Ulcinj. There the Albanians refused to surrender as well. Finally, the Great Powers blockaded Ulcinj by sea and pressured the Ottoman authorities to bring the Albanians under control. The Great Powers decided in 1881 to cede Greece only Thessaly and the district of Arta.

Faced with growing international pressure "to pacify" the refractory Albanians, the sultan dispatched a large army under Dervish Turgut Pasha to suppress the League of Prizren and deliver Ulcinj to Montenegro. Albanians loyal to the empire supported the Sublime Porte's military intervention. In April 1881, Dervish Pasha's 10,000 men captured Prizren and later crushed the resistance at Ulcinj. The League of Prizren's leaders and their families were arrested and deported. Frashëri, who originally received a death sentence, was imprisoned until 1885 and exiled until his death seven years later. In the three years it survived, the League of Prizren effectively made the Great Powers aware of the Albanian people and their national interests. Montenegro and Greece received much less Albanian-populated territory than they would have won without the league's resistance.

Formidable barriers frustrated Albanian leaders' efforts to instill in their people an Albanian rather than an Ottoman identity. Divided into four vilayets, Albanians had no common geographical or political nerve centre. The Albanians' religious differences forced nationalist leaders to give the national movement a purely secular character that alienated religious leaders. The most significant factor uniting the Albanians, their spoken language, lacked a standard literary form and even a standard alphabet. Each of the three available choices, the Latin, Cyrillic, and Arabic scripts, implied different political and religious orientations opposed by one or another element of the population. In 1878 there were no Albanian-language schools in the most developed of the Albanian-inhabited areas and the choice for education was between Orthodox Church schools, where education was in Greek and Ottoman government schools where education was in Turkish.

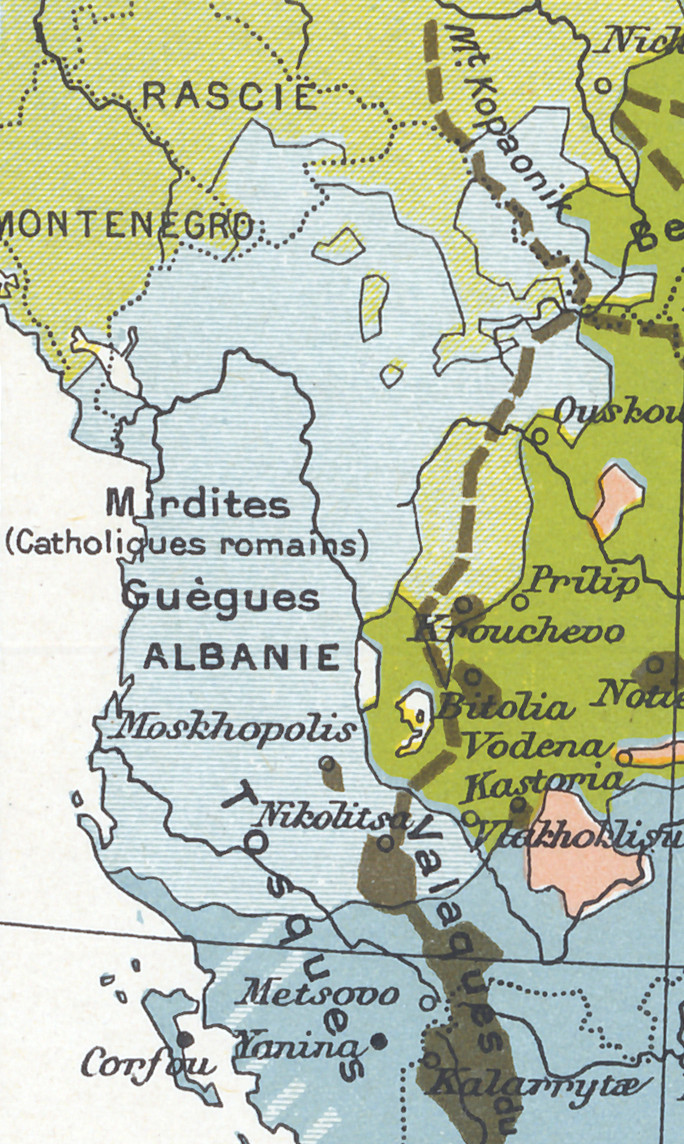
Ethnic distribution of Albanians 1913.

The Ottoman Empire continued to crumble after the Congress of Berlin and Sultan Abdül Hamid II resorted to repression to maintain order. The authorities strove without success to control the political situation in the empire's Albanian-populated lands, arresting suspected nationalist activists. When the sultan refused Albanian demands for unification of the four Albanian-populated vilayets, Albanian leaders reorganized the League of Prizren and incited uprisings that brought the Albanian-populated lands, especially Kosovo, to near anarchy. The imperial authorities disbanded a successor organisation Besa-Besë (League of Peja) founded in 1897, executed its president Haxhi Zeka in 1902, and banned Albanian-language books and correspondence. In Macedonia, where Bulgarian-, Greek-, and Serbian-backed guerrillas were fighting Ottoman authorities and one another for control, Muslim Albanians suffered attacks, and Albanian guerrilla groups retaliated. Albanian leaders meeting in Bitola during 1905 established the Secret Committee for the Liberation of Albania. In 1905, priest Kristo Negovani who had attained Albanian national sentiments abroad returned to his native village of Negovan and introduced the Albanian language for the first time in Orthodox liturgy. For his efforts Negovani was killed by a Greek guerilla band on orders from Bishop Karavangelis of Kastoria that aroused a nationalist response with the Albanian guerilla band of Bajo Topulli killing the Metropolitan of Korçë, Photios.

In 1906 opposition groups in the Ottoman Empire emerged, one of which evolved into the Committee of Union and Progress, more commonly known as the Young Turks, which proposed restoring constitutional government in Constantinople, by revolution if necessary. In July 1908, a month after a Young Turk rebellion in Macedonia supported by an Albanian uprising in Kosovo and Macedonia escalated into widespread insurrection and mutiny within the imperial army, Sultan Abdül Hamid II agreed to demands by the Young Turks to restore constitutional rule. Many Albanians participated in the Young Turks uprising, hoping that it would gain their people autonomy within the empire. The Young Turks lifted the Ottoman ban on Albanian-language schools and on writing the Albanian language. As a consequence, Albanian intellectuals meeting in Bitola in 1908 chose the Latin alphabet as a standard script. The Young Turks, however, were set on maintaining the empire and not interested in making concessions to the myriad nationalist groups within its borders. After securing the abdication of Abdül Hamid II in April 1909, the new authorities levied taxes, outlawed guerrilla groups and nationalist societies, and attempted to extend Constantinople's control over the northern Albanian mountain men. In addition, the Young Turks legalized the bastinado, or beating with a stick, even for misdemeanors, banned carrying rifles, and denied the existence of an Albanian nationality. The new government also appealed for Islamic solidarity to break the Albanians' unity and used the Muslim clergy to try to impose the Arabic alphabet.

The Albanians refused to submit to the Young Turks' campaign to "Ottomanise" them by force. New Albanian uprisings began in Kosovo and the northern mountains in early April 1910. Ottoman forces quashed these rebellions after three months, outlawed Albanian organizations, disarmed entire regions, and closed down schools and publications. Montenegro held ambitions of future expansion into neighbouring Albanian-populated lands and supported a 1911 uprising by the mountain tribes against the Young Turks regime that grew into a widespread revolt. Unable to control the Albanians by force, the Ottoman government granted concessions on schools, military recruitment, and taxation and sanctioned the use of the Latin script for the Albanian language. The government refused, however, to unite the four Albanian-inhabited vilayets.

=== Revolts of 1910 and 1911 ===
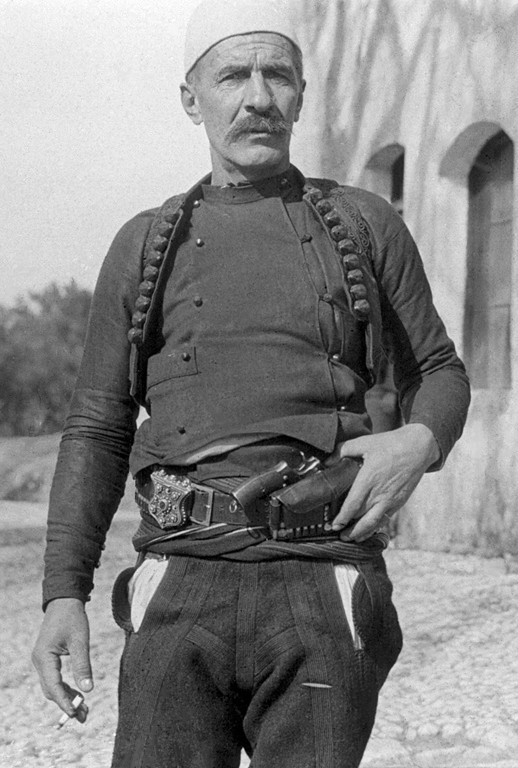
Guerrilla fighter Isa Boletini.

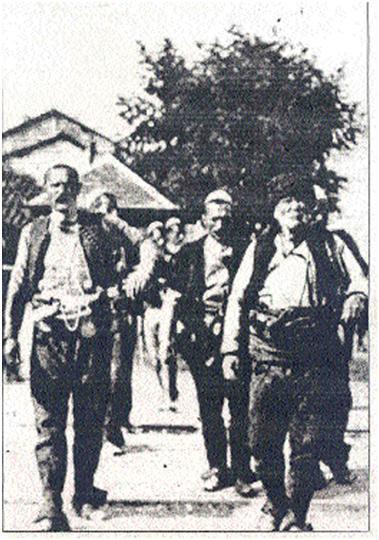
Idriz Seferi with his rebels entering Ferizaj in 1910

In 1910, due to the new centralisation policies of the Young Turk Ottoman government towards Albanians, local Albanian leaders Isa Boletini and Idriz Seferi started an uprising against the Ottomans in the Kosovo vilayet. After subduing the Ottoman garrisons in towns such as Prishtina and Ferizaj, the Ottoman government declared martial law and sent a military expedition of 16,000 men led by Shefket Turgut Pasha. Simultaneously, forces under Idriz Seferi captured the Kaçanik pass. They successfully defended the pass from the Ottoman expeditionary force thus, forcing them to send a force of 40,000 men. After two weeks the pass was lost to the Ottomans After fierce fighting, the rebels retreated to Drenica and the Ottomans seized control of Prizren, Gjakova and Peja Afterwards Ottoman forces incurred into Northern Albania and Macedonia. Ottoman forces were stopped for more than 20 days in the Agri Pass, from the Albanian forces of Shalë, Shoshë, Nikaj and Mërtur areas, led by Prel Tuli, Mehmet Shpendi, and Marash Delia. Unable to repress their resistance, this column took another way to Scutari, passing from the Pukë region. On July 24, 1910, Ottoman forces entered the city of Scutari. During this period martial courts were put in action and summary executions took place. A large number of firearms were collected and many villages and properties were burned by the Ottoman army.

In 1911, the Albanian National Committee was formed. In a meeting of the committee held in Podgorica from 2 to 4 February 1911, under the leadership of Nikolla bey Ivanaj and Sokol Baci Ivezaj, it was decided to organise an Albanian uprising. Terenzio Tocci gathered the Mirditë chieftains on 26/27 April 1911 in Orosh, proclaimed the independence of Albania, raised the flag of Albania (according to Robert Elsie it was raised for the first time after Skanderbeg's death) and established the provisional government. Shefqet Turgut Pasha wanted to meet this threat and returned to the region with 8.000 soldiers. As soon as he reached Shkodër on 11 May, he issued a general proclamation which declared martial law and offered an amnesty for all rebels (except for Malësor chieftains) if they immediately return to their homes. After Ottoman troops entered the area Tocci fled the empire abandoning his activities. After months of intense fighting, the rebels were trapped and decided to escape to Montenegro.

On 23 June 1911, in the village of Gerče, in Montenegro, an assembly of the tribal leaders of the revolt was held to adopt the "Greçë Memorandum". This memorandum was signed by 22 Albanian chieftains, four from each tribe of Hoti, Grudë and Skrel, five from Kastrati, three from Klemendi and two from Shalë.

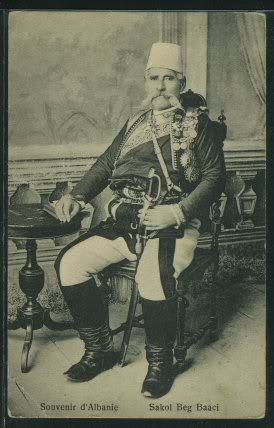
Sokol Baci Ivezaj — one of the leaders of the 1911 revolt

Requests of the memorandum included:

1. general amnesty for all participants in the revolt
2. demand for recognition of the Albanian ethnicity
3. election of the deputies of Albanian ethnicity for the Ottoman Parliament according to the proportional system
4. Albanian language in schools
5. governor and other appointed high officials have to know Albanian language and all other positions in the administration have to be reserved only for people of Albanian ethnicity
6. men who are ethnic Albanians to serve army only in Albania during the peacetime
7. confiscated arms to be returned
8. all Albanian property damaged by Ottoman troops to be compensated

The Memorandum was submitted to the representatives of Great Powers in Cetinje, Montenegro.

Ottoman representatives managed to deal with the leaders of Albanian rebels in Kosovo Vilayet and Scutari Vilayet separately, because they were not united and lacked central control. The Ottomans promised to meet most Albanian demands, limited mainly to Catholic highlanders like general amnesty, the opening of Albanian language schools, and the restriction that military service was to be performed only in the territory of the vilayets with substantial Albanian population. Other demands included requiring administrative officers to learn the Albanian language, and that the possession of weapons would be permitted.

=== Revolts of 1912 ===
Skopje after being captured by Albanian revolutionaries in August, 1912 who defeated the Ottoman forces holding the city.

The Albanian Revolt of 1912 was one of many Albanian revolts in the Ottoman Empire and lasted from January until August 1912. Albanian soldiers and officers deserted the Ottoman military service and joined the insurgents. After a series of successes, Albanian revolutionaries managed to capture the city of Skopje, the administrative centre of Kosovo vilayet within the Ottoman rule.

On August 9, 1912, Albanian rebels presented a new list of demands (the so-called list of Fourteen Points), related to the Albanian vilayet, that can be summarized as follows:

- autonomous system of administration and justice of four vilayets populated with Albanians (Albanian vilayet)
- Albanians to perform military service only in territory of four vilayets populated with Albanians, except in time of war
- employing officials who know local language and customs, but not necessarily Albanians,
- establishment of new licees and agricultural schools in the bigger districts
- reorganisation and modernisation of the religious schools and use of Albanian language in secular schools
- freedom to establish private schools and societies
- the development of trade, agriculture and public works
- general amnesty for all Albanians involved in revolt
- court martial for those Ottoman officers who attempted to suppress the revolt

The revolt ended when the Ottoman government agreed to fulfill the rebels' demands, except of the last one, on September 4, 1912. The autonomous system of administration and justice of the four vilayets with a substantial Albanian population was accepted by the Ottoman Empire, however they avoided granting autonomy to a unitary Albanian vilayet which was part of the Albanian National Awakening agenda during the League of Prizren.

=== Independence ===
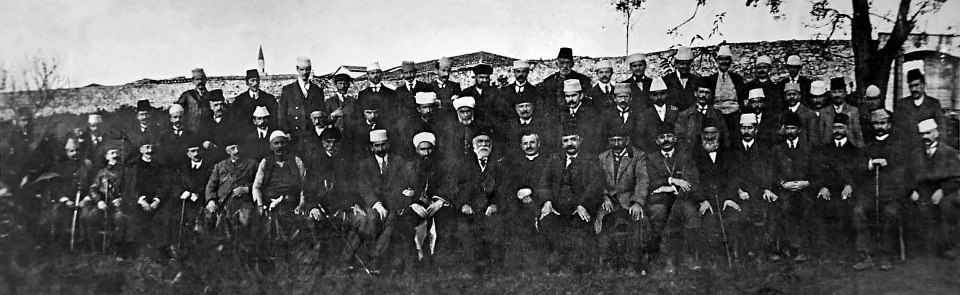
Members of the Assembly of Vlorë photographed in November 1912.

The First Balkan War, however, erupted before a final settlement could be worked out. The Balkan allies—Serbia, Bulgaria, Montenegro and Greece—quickly drove the Ottomans to the walls of Constantinople. The Montenegrins surrounded Scutari.

An assembly of Muslim and Christian leaders meeting in Vlorë in November 1912 declared Albania an independent country. The complete text of the declaration was:

In Vlora, on the 15th/28th of November. That time the President was Ismail Kemal Bey, in which he spoke of the great perils facing Albania today, the delegates have all decided unanimously that Albania, as of today, should be on her own, free and independent.

A second session of the Assembly of Vlorë was held on December 4, 1912. During that session members of the assembly established the Provisional Government of Albania. It was a government that consisted of ten members, led by Ismail Qemali until his resignation on 22 January 1914. The Assembly established the Senate (Albanian: Pleqësi) with an advisory role to the government, consisting of 18 members of the Assembly. An ambassadorial conference that opened in London in December decided the major questions concerning the Albanians after the First Balkan War in its concluding Treaty of London of May 1913. The Albanian delegation in London was assisted by Aubrey Herbert, MP, a passionate advocate of their cause.

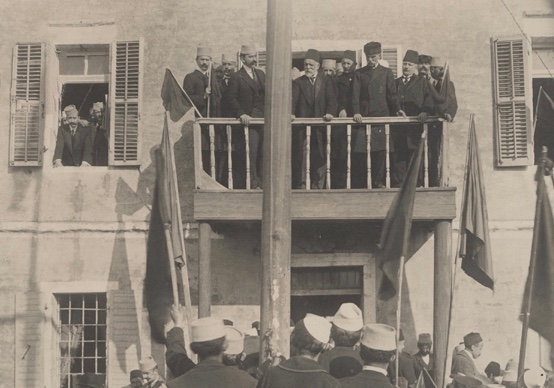
Ismail Qemali and his cabinet during the celebration of the first anniversary of independence in Vlorë on 28 November 1913.

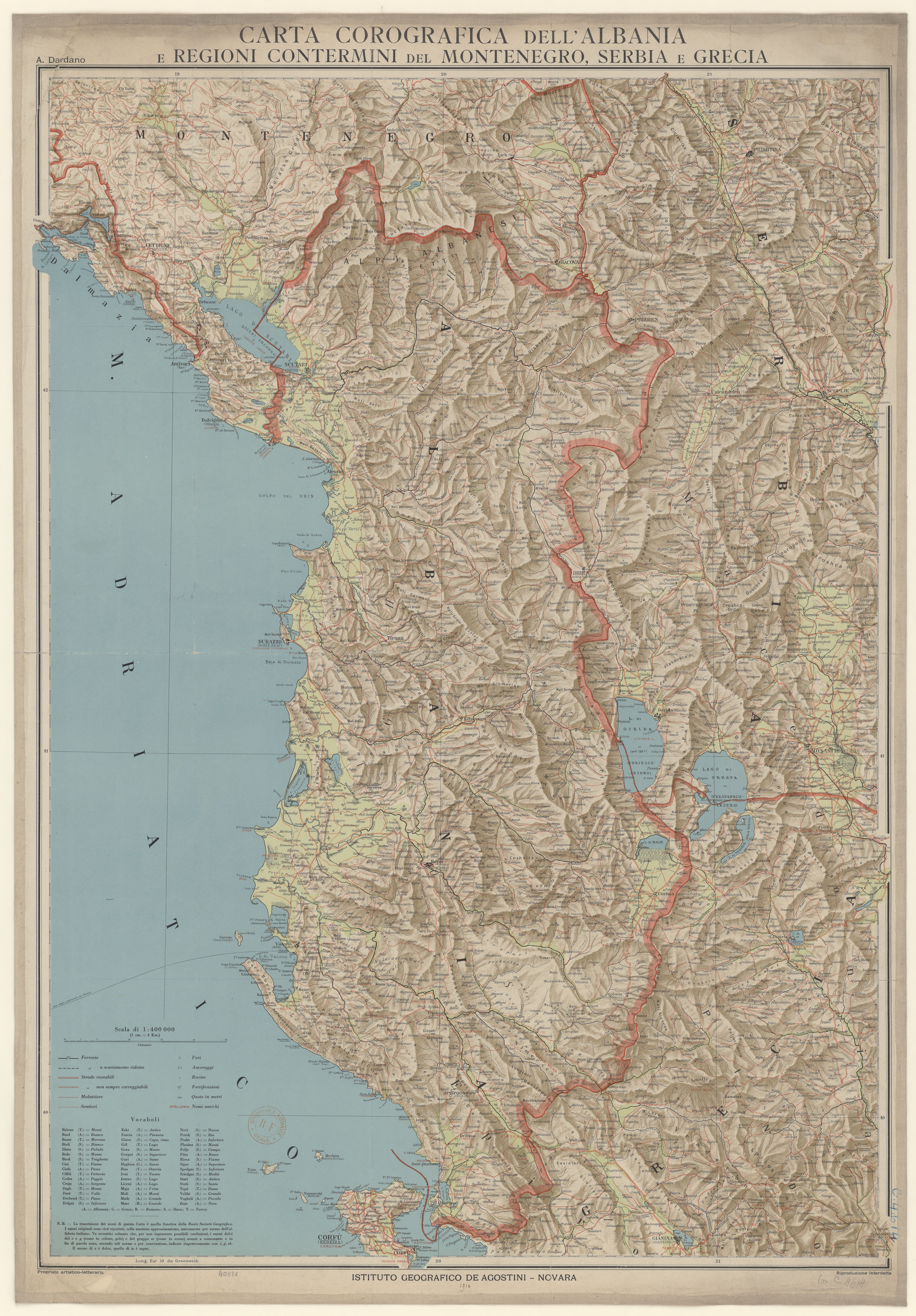
The borders of Albania, as recognised by the Great Powers in 1913.

One of Serbia's primary war aims was to gain an Adriatic port, preferably Durrës. Austria-Hungary and Italy opposed giving Serbia an outlet to the Adriatic, which they feared would become a Russian port. They instead supported the creation of an autonomous Albania. Russia backed Serbia's and Montenegro's claims to Albanian-inhabited lands. Britain and Germany remained neutral. Chaired by Britain's foreign secretary, Sir Edward Grey, the ambassadors' conference initially decided to create an autonomous Albania under continued Ottoman rule, but with the protection of the Great Powers. This solution, as detailed in the Treaty of London, was abandoned in the summer of 1913 when it became obvious that the Ottoman Empire would, in the Second Balkan War, lose Macedonia and hence its overland connection with the Albanian-inhabited lands.

In July 1913, the Great Powers opted to recognise an independent, neutral Albanian state ruled by a constitutional monarchy and under the protection of the Great Powers. The August 1913 Treaty of Bucharest established that independent Albania was a country with borders that gave the new state about 28,000 square kilometres of territory and a population of 800,000. Montenegro had to surrender Scutari after having lost 10,000 men in the process of taking the town. Serbia reluctantly succumbed to an ultimatum from Austria-Hungary, Germany, and Italy to withdraw from northern Albania. The treaty, however, left large areas with majority Albanian populations, notably Kosovo and western Macedonia, outside the new state and failed to solve the region's nationality problems.

== Culture ==
=== Arts ===
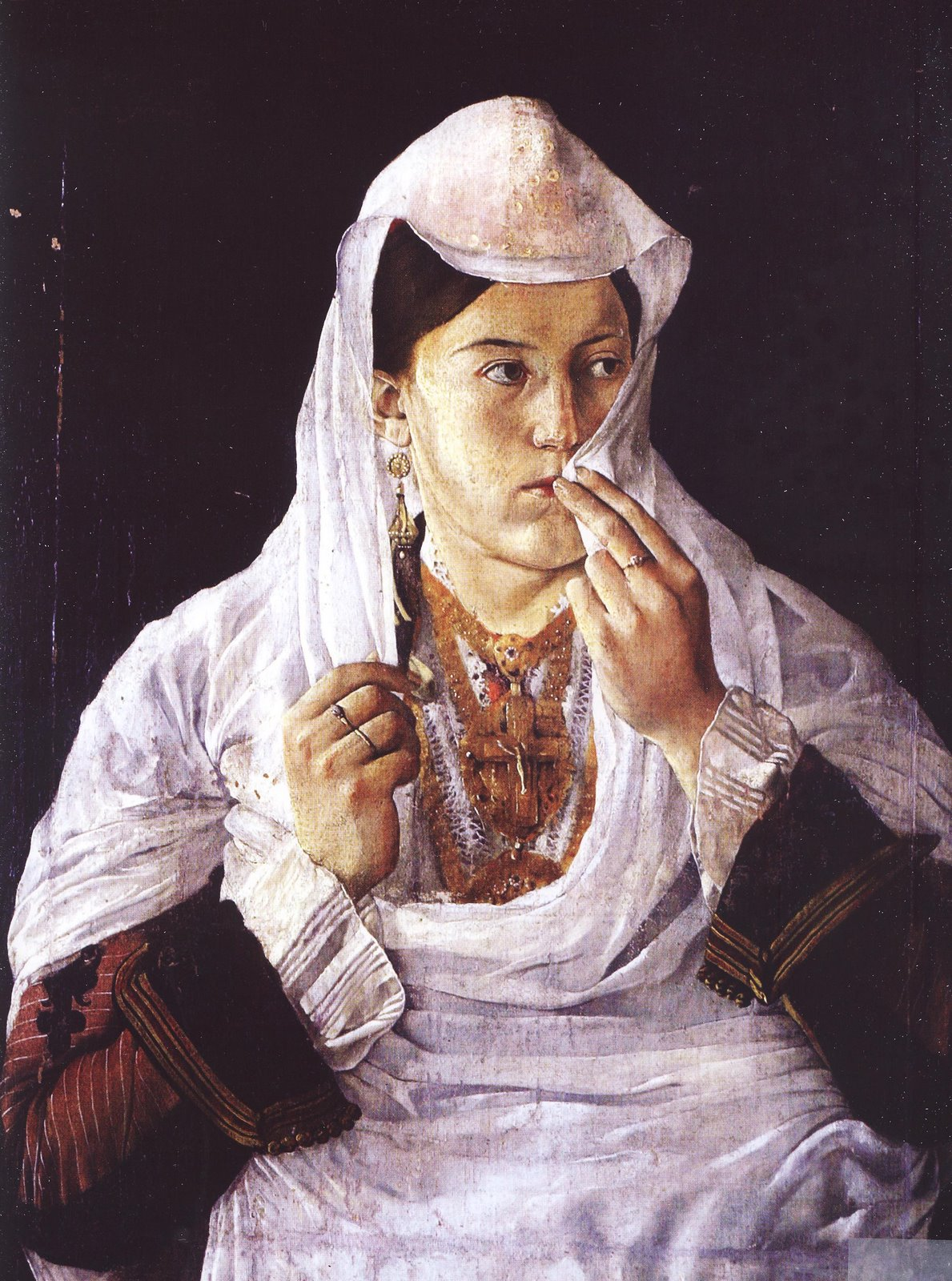
Motra Tone by Kolë Idromeno.

The Albanian Renaissance is one of the most valuable periods in Albanian culture, a period characterised by a cultural, economic, political and social flourishing of Albanian consciousness within the Ottoman Empire. The period is directly connected with Jorgji Panariti and Kolë Idromeno, the most renowned representatives of the Albanian Renaissance.

=== Literature ===
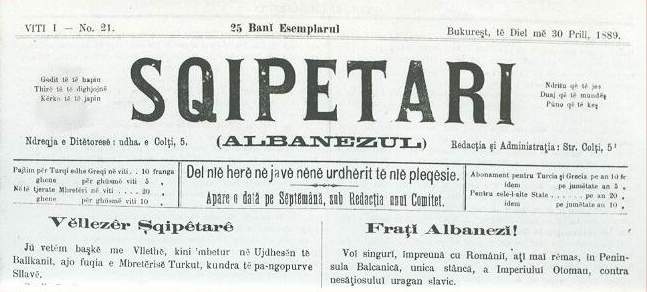
Albanezul, the newspaper of the Albanian minority in Romania from 1889.

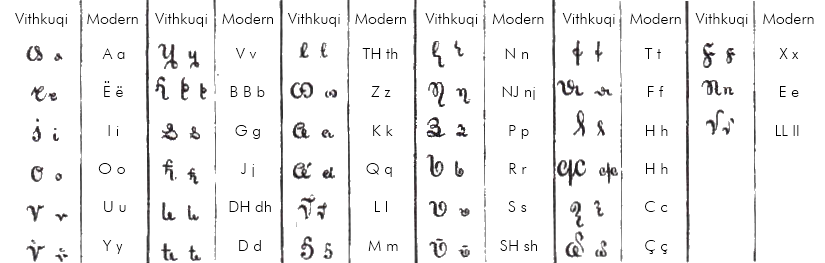
Naum Veqilharxhi's Vithkuqi script was the first Albanian alphabet published in 1845.

Albanian intellectuals in the nineteenth century began devising a single, standard Albanian literary language and making demands that it be used in schools. In Constantinople in 1879, Sami Frashëri founded a cultural and educational organization, the Society for the Printing of Albanian Writings, whose membership comprised Muslim, Catholic, and Orthodox Albanians. Naim Frashëri, the most-renowned Albanian poet, joined the society and wrote and edited textbooks. Albanian émigrés in Bulgaria, Egypt, Italy, Romania, and the United States supported the society's work. The Greeks, who dominated the education of Orthodox Albanians, joined the Turks in suppressing the Albanians' culture, especially Albanian-language education. In 1886 the ecumenical patriarch of Constantinople threatened to excommunicate anyone found reading or writing Albanian, and priests taught that God would not understand prayers uttered in Albanian. In 1844-5 however, Albanian intellectual Naum Veqilharxhi published his work Evëtori Shqip Fort i Shkurtër (English: The short Albanian Evëtor) which was an alphabet that included thirty three letters which were invented by himself. He avoided the use of Latin, Greek or Arabic alphabets and characters because of their religious associations and divisions. In November 1869, a Commission for the Alphabet of the Albanian Language was gathered in Istanbul.

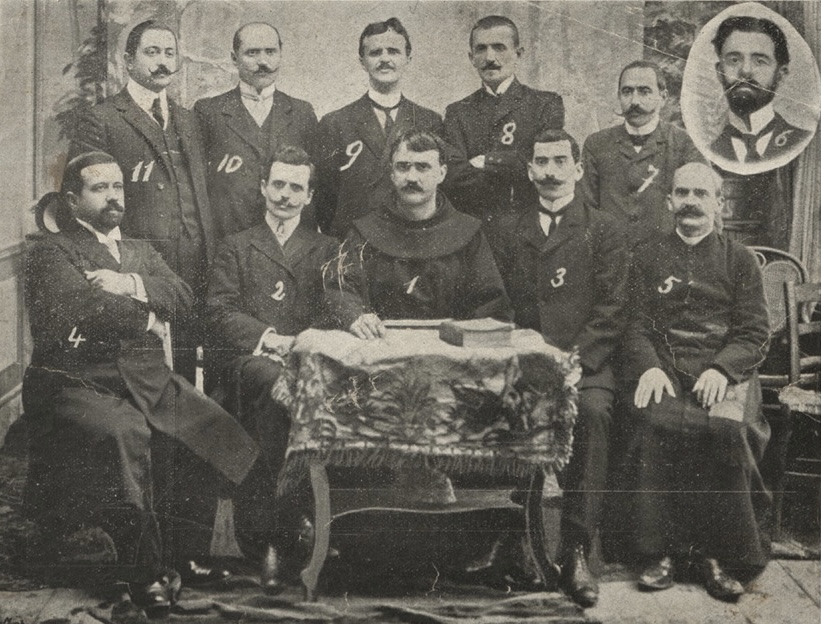
The Commission of the Manastir Congress in a rare photo (1908).

One of its members was Kostandin Kristoforidhi and the main purpose of the Commission was the creation of a unique alphabet for all the Albanians. In January 1870 the Commission ended its work of the standardization of the alphabet, which was mainly in Latin letters. A plan on the creation of textbooks and spread of Albanian schools was drafted. However this plan was not realized, because the Ottoman Government wouldn't finance the expenses for the establishment of such schools. Although this commission had gathered and delivered an alphabet in 1870, the writers from the North still used the Latin-based alphabet, whereas in Southern Albania writers used mostly the Greek letters. The turning point was the aftermath of the League of Prizren (1878) events when in 1879 Sami Frashëri and Naim Frashëri formed the Society for the Publication of Albanian Writings. Members of the society Sami Frashëri, Naim Frashëri and Jani Vreto published the Primer of the Albanian language and other works in Albanian that dealt with the humanities, natural sciences and so on. After a long time struggling with obstacles coming from the Ottoman authorities, the first secular school of Albanian language was opened on the initiative of individual teachers and other intellectuals on 7 March 1887 in Korce. Diamanti Tërpo, a citizen of the city, offered her house to serve as a school building. The first director and teacher of the school was Pandeli Sotiri.

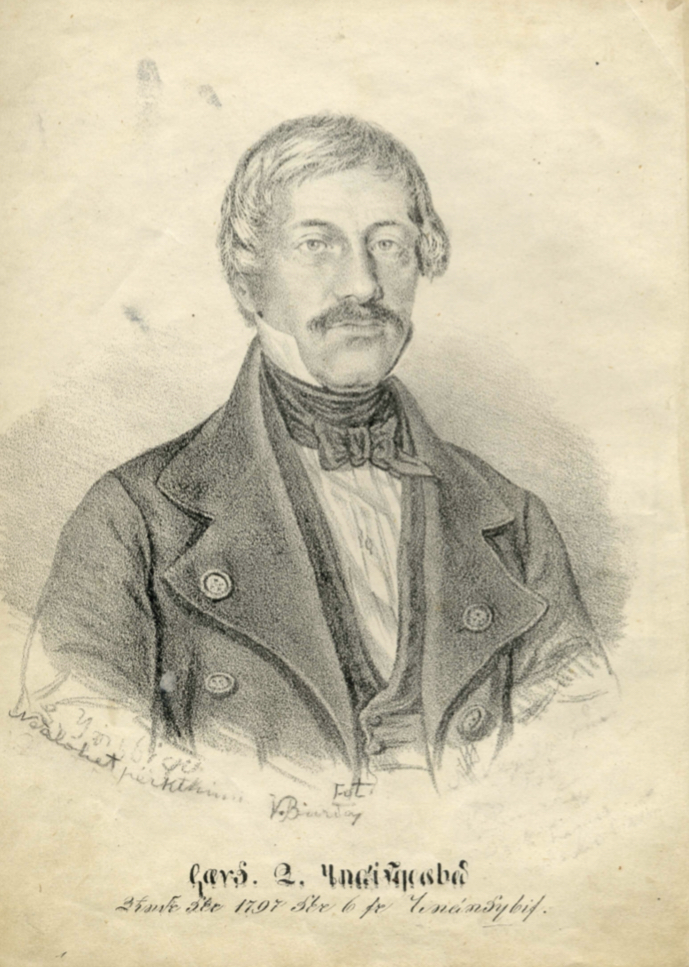
Naum Veqilharxhi
(1797–1854)

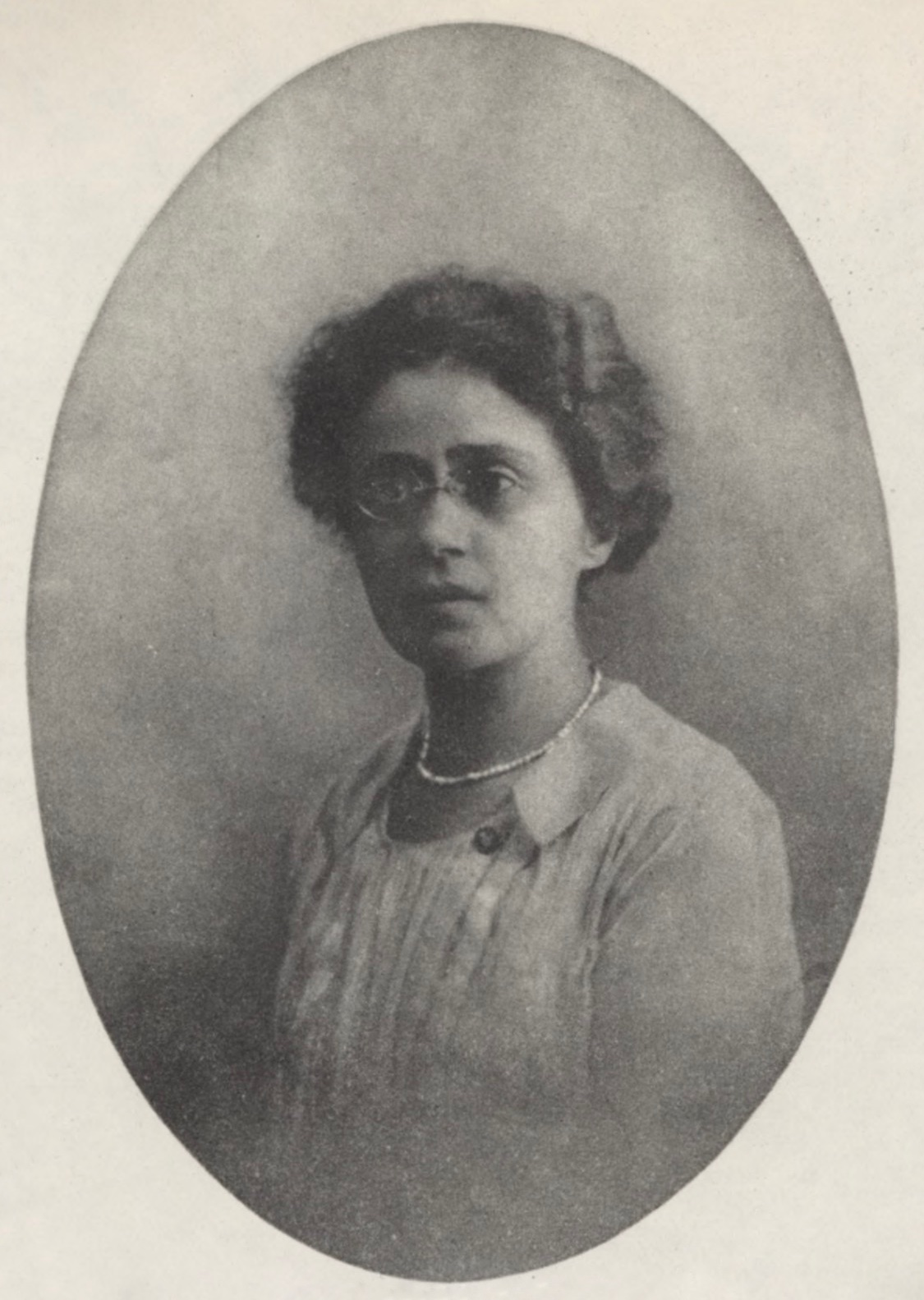
Parashqevi Qiriazi
(1880–1970)

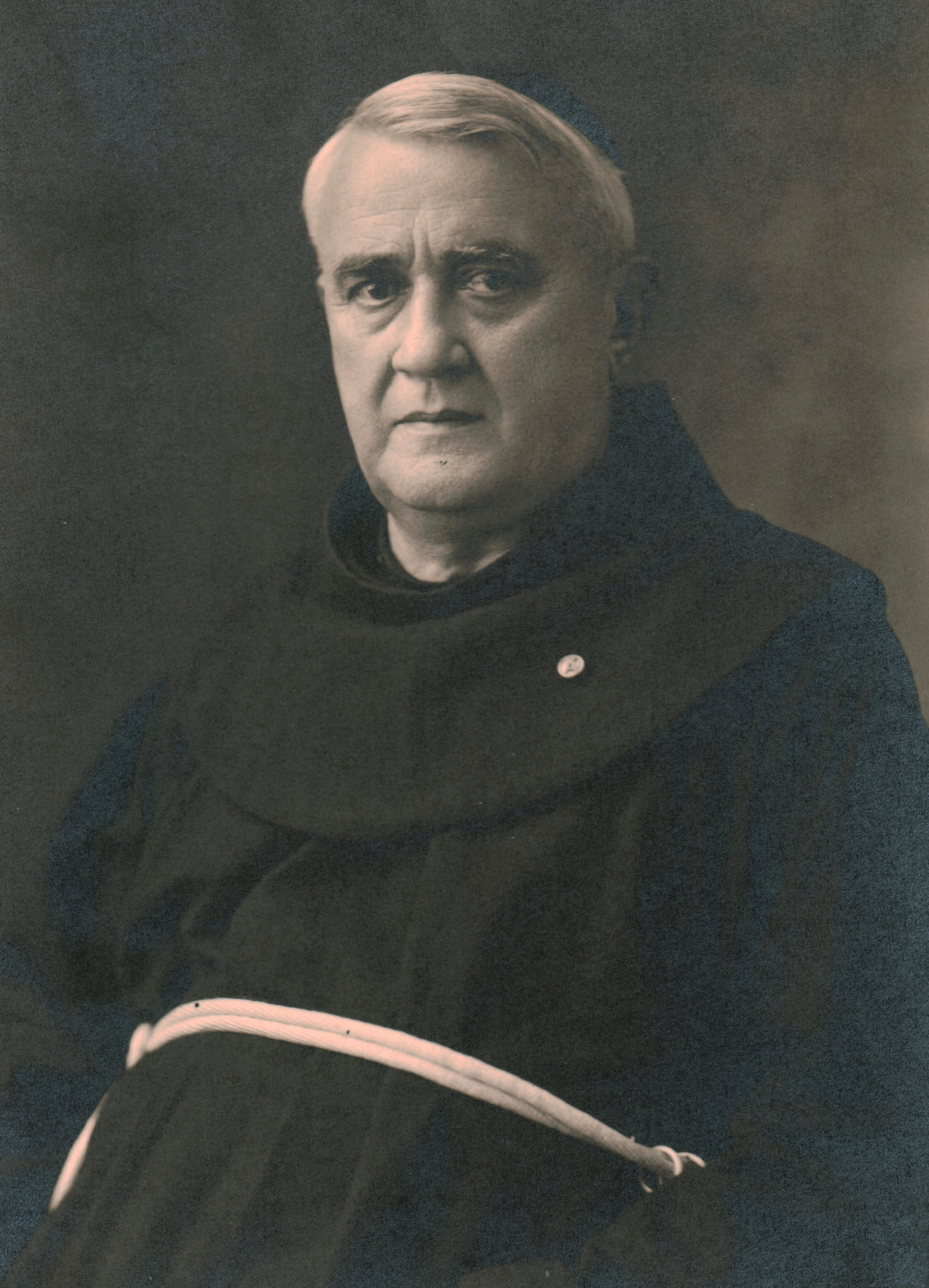
Gjergj Fishta
(1871–1940)

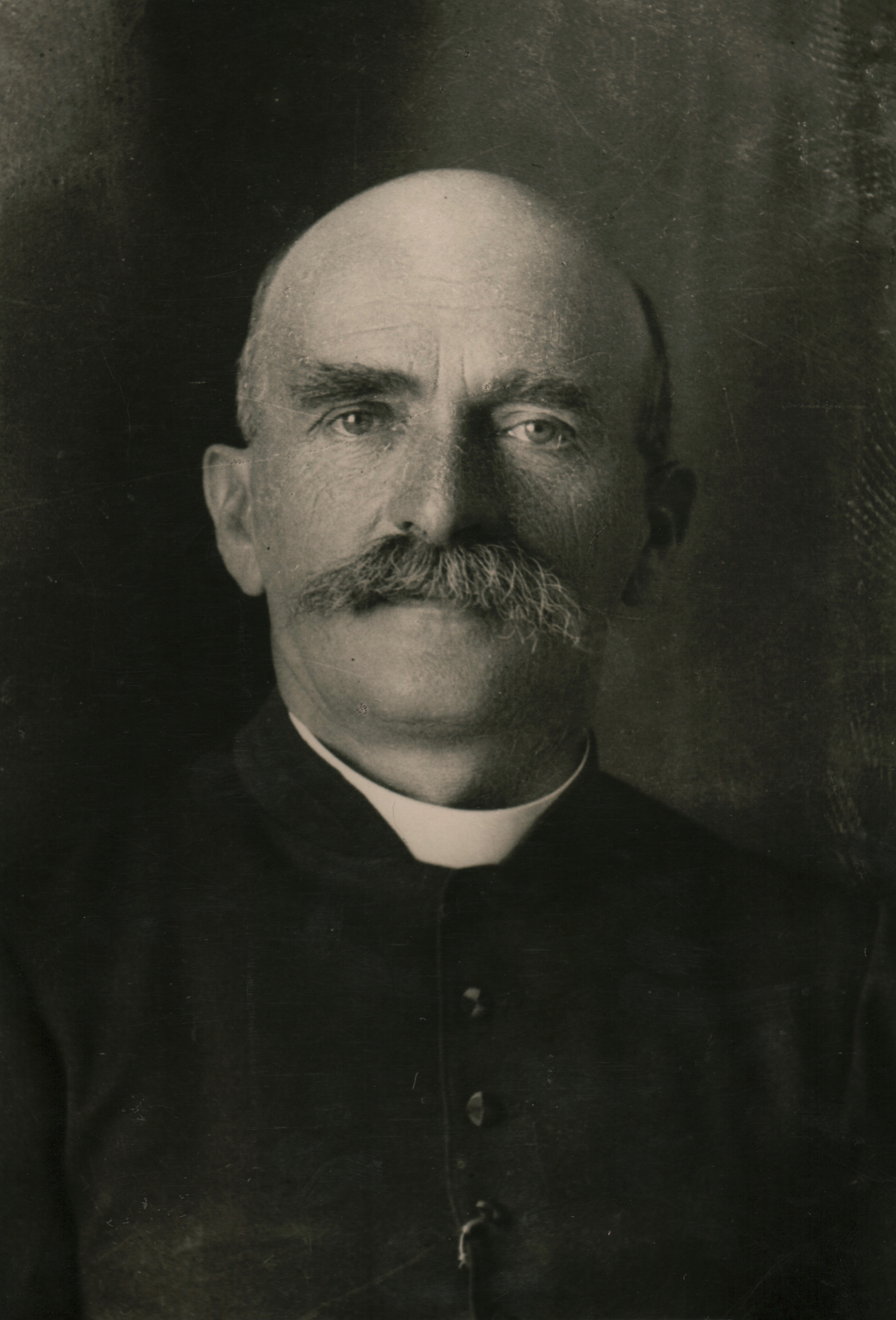
Ndre Mjeda
(1866–1937)

One year earlier, the Albanian dictionary (Fjalori i Gjuhës Shqipe) by Kostandin Kristoforidhi had been published in 1904. The dictionary had been drafted 25 years before its publication and was written in the Greek alphabet. In 1908, the Congress of Monastir was held by Albanian intellectuals in Bitola (in modern-day North Macedonia). The Congress was hosted by the Bashkimi (unity) club, and prominent delegates included Gjergj Fishta, Ndre Mjeda, Mit'hat Frashëri, Sotir Peçi, Shahin Kolonja, and Gjergj D. Qiriazi. There was much debate and the contending alphabets were Istanbul, Bashkimi and Agimi. However, the Congress was unable to make a clear decision and opted for a compromise solution of using both the widely used Istanbul, with minor changes, and a modified version of the Bashkimi alphabet. Usage of the alphabet of Istanbul declined rapidly and it was essentially extinct over the following decades. The Bashkimi alphabet is at the origin of the official alphabet of the Albanian language in use today.

A major role during the Albanian National Awakening was played by literature, which served to many Rilindas as a way to express their ideas. It was imbued with the spirit of national liberation, with the nostalgia of the émigré and the rhetorical pathos of past heroic wars. This literary school developed the poetry most. Regarding the motifs and poetical forms, its hero was the ethical man, the fighting Albanian, and to a lesser degree the tragic man. Because its major purpose was to awaken national consciousness it was closely linked with the folklore tradition.

== See also ==
- History of Albania
- Albanian nationalism
- Albanophobia
- Dissolution of the Ottoman Empire

== Bibliography ==
- Library of Congress Country Study of Albania
- Blumi, Isa (2011). Reinstating the Ottomans, Alternative Balkan Modernities: 1800–1912. New York: Palgrave MacMillan. ISBN 9780230119086.
- Brisku, Adrian (2013). Bittersweet Europe: Albanian and Georgian Discourses on Europe, 1878–2008. Berghahn Books. ISBN 978-0-85745-985-5.
- Clayer, Nathalie (2005). "Le meurtre du prêtre: Acte fondateur de la mobilisation nationaliste albanaise à l'aube de la révolution Jeune Turque [The murder of the priest: Founding act of the Albanian nationalist mobilisation on the eve of the Young Turks revolution]". Balkanologie. IX (1–2).
- Clayer, Nathalie (2007). Aux origines du nationalisme albanais: La naissance d'une nation majoritairement musulmane en Europe [The origins of Albanian nationalism: The birth of a predominantly Muslim nation in Europe]. Paris: Karthala. ISBN 9782845868168.
- Dauti, Daut (30 January 2018). Britain, the Albanian Question and the Demise of the Ottoman Empire 1876–1914 (phd). University of Leeds.
- Dauti, Daut (2023). Britain, the Albanian National Question and the Fall of the Ottoman Empire, 1876-1914. Bloomsbury Publishing. ISBN 9781350349544.
- Elsie, Robert (2010). Historical Dictionary of Albania. Lanham, Maryland: Scarecrow Press (The Rowman & Littlefield Publishing Group Incorporated). ISBN 978-0-8108-6188-6.
- Fleming, K. E. (2014). The Muslim Bonaparte: Diplomacy and Orientalism in Ali Pasha's Greece. Princeton University Press. ISBN 978-1-4008-6497-3.
- Gawrych, George (2006). The Crescent and the Eagle: Ottoman rule, Islam and the Albanians, 1874–1913. London: IB Tauris. ISBN 9781845112875.
- Mazower, Mark (2000). The Balkans: A Short History. Modern Library Chronicles. New York: Random House. ISBN 0-679-64087-8.
- Schwandner-Sievers and Fischer (eds.), Albanian Identities: Myth and History, Indiana University Press (2002), ISBN 0-253-21570-6.
- Sette, Alessandro. "L'Albania nella strategia diplomatica italiana (1871-1915)", Nuova Rivista Storica, 102, I (2018): 321–378.
- Skendi, Stavro (1967). The Albanian national awakening. Princeton: Princeton University Press. ISBN 9781400847761.
- Zickel, Raymond; Iwaskiw, Walter R. (1994). Albania: A Country Study. Washington, D.C.: GPO for Library of Congress.
