= Nicodemus of Elbasan =

Albanian saint

Saint Nicodemus of Berat Nicodemus the Younger Nikodhimi i Beratit
- Born: Vithkuq
- Died: 11 July 1722
- Cause of death: Beheaded
- Venerated in: Eastern orthodoxy
- Feast: 11 July

The new martyr Nicodemus, also known as Saint Nicodemus of Berat (Albanian: Shën Nikodhimi i Beratit) or Saint Nicodemus the Younger, was born in Vithkuq in present-day Albania. He was married and had children there. Later he converted to Islam and then became a Christian again, at Mount Athos, Greece. After three years he decided to return in his native town, informing the Muslim authorities of his decision. He was beheaded on 11 July 1722. His relics are venerated in Berat.

== Life ==
The secular name of Nicodemus was Nikolla Dede, and he was originally from Vithkuq, Korça. He lived in Berat, where he practiced tailoring. He had been married four times and his fourth wife was a Muslim, so he converted for her sake. The first son, who was in adulthood, refused to convert, so he left home and settled in the Holy Mountain. When he learned that his son was on Mount Athos, Nicholas wanted to meet him. He went to Mount Athos, and when he saw the monks' lives, prayers, fasting, and religious services, he repented and realised the sin he had committed.

He went to skete of St. Anne, presented himself to the patriarch Philotheus and became a monk, taking the name Nicodemus. There he repented so much that he fasted for three years, praying to God.

On Mount Athos, Nicodemus learned that the man who denied Christ in front of people could only be forgiven by God if he affirmed it again in front of people, so the desire arose to return to Berat and confess Christ before all. Before leaving, he had a meeting with a well-known ascetic of Athos, with the hermit Acacius, to whom he asked for advice. Nicodemus left for Berat with a stick in his hand. As soon as he arrived, people recognized him immediately. As soon as they had learned of the matter of his conversion to Christianity, they reported him and brought him before the Kadi. At first the Kadi tried to persuade him to refrain from such an act, but seeing his insistence, ordered that he be executed. Nicodemus was sentenced to beheading on July 10, 1709. In some Greek ecclesiastical sources, the date and year of his martyrdom are given as July 11, 1722 and 1714.

The service dedicated to the saint, a Greek "Biography of St. Nicodemus the Younger of Vithkuq", was published in 1741 by Gregory of Durrës. The publication was printed at the Academy of Moscopole.

The relics of St. Nicodemus were found in the church of St. Michael. After the destruction of the churches, in 1967, the relics were to be destroyed, but the bones were rescued by the faithful, while the head of the saint was taken by the psalmist Lili Thimi Koçi, who hid it in the wall of his house, to protect it from any possible robbery or desecration. The saint's head is stored in a silver box, which weighs 755 grams. The silver box was engraved by Berat jewelers. On July 10, 1991, Lili Koçi's son, Llazar, took the saint's head from the wall and sent it to church to honor the faithful. Every 10 July, the head of St. Nicodemus of Berat is sent to the church of St. Michael, by Llazar Koçi, who piously guards it in his own house.

== Sources ==
- July 11/July 24. Orthodox Calendar (PRAVOSLAVIE.RU).
- Holy New Martyr Nikodemos the Albanian of Elbasan (+1722)
- Ἀκολουθία τοῦ ἁγίου ὁσιομάρτυρος Νικοδήμου τοῦ μαρτυρήσαντος ἐν τῆ πόλει Βελεγράδων κατὰ τὸ αψθ ἔτος Ἰουλίοῳ ι, ποιηθεῖσα παρὰ τοῦ ἐν Ἱερομονάχοις Γρηγορίου Μοσχοπολίτου. [1741?]
- Përmbledhje nga jeta e Shën Nikodhimit të Beratit
