= Jan Evstrat Vithkuqari =

Albanian scholar, educator, and translator

Jan Evstrat Vithkuqari (ca. 1755-1822) was an Albanian scholar, educator, and translator.

== Life ==
He was born in Vithkuq, Ottoman Empire (modern Albania) possibly in 1755. He studied in the New Academy of Moscopole, where he worked as a teacher. He also worked as a teacher in Arta, Përmet and Ioannina. Apart from Albanian, which he spoke in the Tosk dialect, he knew English and Greek.

He wrote a grammar book of the Albanian language and was the co-author of a 2000-word English-Greek-Albanian dictionary included in William Martin Leake's Researches in Greece published in 1814.
