= Vithkuqi script =

Alphabet for the Albanian language

Vithkuqi
- Script type: Alphabet
- Direction: Left-to-right

ISO 15924
- ISO 15924: Vith (228), Vithkuqi

Unicode
- Unicode alias: Vithkuqi
- Unicode range: U+10570–U+105BF

The alphabet of Naum Veqilharxhi was an alphabet devised in the 19th century to represent the Albanian language by scholar Naum Veqilharxhi, who alone made use of it in his educational works.

== Name ==
Known to Albanian scholars simply as "alphabet of Naum Veqilharxhi" (Albanian: alfabeti i (Naum) Veqilharxhit), it was mentioned in 1854 by Johann Georg von Hahn as a recently invented alphabet by a certain Büthakukje, confusing the author's name with his birthplace, Vithkuq, a village in Korçë County. The confusion was carried over by following Western scholars. Michael Everson, encoding the alphabet into Unicode, modernised the German misnomer as Vithkuqi, the modern spelling of the town, now official name of the script in ISO 15924.

== History ==
At the time, as the result of various factors, Albanian was still a language that was relatively rarely written in. Generally, the Catholics wrote in the Latin alphabet, the Orthodox in the Greek alphabet and the Muslims in the Perso-Arabic abjad. Naum Veqilharxhi was of the opinion that Albanian, as an independent language, should have its own writing system to avoid the imported scripts to carry foreign political and religious influences. Exile in Bucharest, he came into contact with the ideas of 19th century Balkan Enlightenment thinkers, and is known to have personally met Ivan Seliminski and Petar Beron, who in 1824 published the Fish Primer.

He published in 1844 his first primer in the language, and in 1845 a second, longer primer, both lithographed in Bucharest by Georg Johann Venrich. His work was well-received in Korça, and was praised by George Bariț in 1845 in his newspaper Gazeta de Transilvania and by Ion Heliade Rădulescu in 1846 in his newspaper Curierul Românesc, and from these it gained the attention of Austrian philologists.

In 1846, year in which he is believed to have been poisoned, Veqilharxhi wrote an open letter against his opponents saying:

Those nations that remain ignorant resemble mere slaves, working every day for the pleasure of more civilized and more powerful nations. They will only be able to emerge from their shameful state of misery when they begin to cultivate their national language, but this cannot be achieved if not by distinctive national letters.

In 1847 the alphabet was cut for typographic use in Vienna, by the Austrian philologists and punchcutter Alois Auer. The same type was also used by following compendiums of alphabets published in Vienna. It was the first typeface to be cut for an original Albanian script.

The alphabet was also known to notable Italo-Albanians such as Girolamo de Rada, Demetrio Camarda and Vincenzo Dorsa.

== Description ==
The Vithkuqi script had a close correspondence between letters and phonemes, but did not distinguish between r /ɾ/ and rr /r/ both represented as ⟨𐖱⟩, due to the distinction being absent from the dialects of the region Veqilharxhi hailed from, and between ç /t͡ʃ/ and xh /d͡ʒ/, both represented as ⟨𐖛⟩, as those sounds are allegedly also often confused in the dialects of the area. Compare how these two affricates are also spelt with a single character in another otherwise very phonemic orthography, the Elbasan alphabet.

The orthography made use of two digraphs, the sound gj /ɟ/ was represented by ⟨𐕺𐖦⟩, that is g followed by i with a semivocalic mark above, while zh /ʒ/ was represented by ⟨𐖴𐖼⟩, that is sh followed by z. The i with the semivocalic mark above was also used in the digraphs ⟨𐖧𐖦⟩, which like ⟨𐖧⟩ stood for /j/, but only whenever not followed by a vowel, and more rarely ⟨𐖰𐖦⟩, equivalent to ⟨𐖰⟩ /c/ with the same restriction.

The script differentiated between ⟨𐖣⟩, which stood for /h/, and ⟨𐖤⟩ which, much like Greek ⟨χ⟩, stood for /ç/ before front vowels and /x/ elsewhere, which was found in Greek and Turkish loanwords as well as native words under specific phonetic conditions where the modern standard has the phoneme /h/. The sound /ɣ/, absent from the modern standard, was represented as ⟨𐖡̆⟩, that is the g with a breve-like diacritic above, but unlike other letter alterations, such as ⟨𐖻⟩ y, ⟨𐖰⟩ q, ⟨𐖴⟩ sh or ⟨𐖜⟩ d, he never listed it as a separate letter. The letter b /b/ ⟨𐖙⟩ has a cursive variant ⟨𐖘⟩. Alphabetical order follows the Greek one, with the exception that vowels were separated from consonants.

For accurate images, see the scans at Wikisource.

Capital letter		Small letter		Modern Albanian	IPA
Image	Text	Image	Text	Modern Albanian	IPA
	𐕰		𐖗	a	/a/
	𐕸		𐖟	ë	/ə/
	𐕷		𐖞	e	/e/
	𐕾		𐖥	i	/i/
	𐖇		𐖮	o	/o/
	𐖐		𐖷	u	/u/
	𐖔		𐖻	y	/y/
	𐖑		𐖸	v	/v/
	𐕲		𐖙	b	/b/
	𐕱		𐖘	b	/b/
	𐕺		𐖡	g	/ɡ/
	𐖀		𐖧	j	/j/
	𐕶		𐖝	dh	/ð/
	𐕵		𐖜	d	/d/
	𐖏		𐖶	th	/θ/
	𐖕		𐖼	z	/z/
	𐖁		𐖨	k	/k/
	𐖉		𐖰	q	/c/
	𐖃		𐖪	ll	/ɫ/
	𐖂		𐖩	l	/l/
	𐖄		𐖫	m	/m/
	𐖅		𐖬	n	/n/
	𐖆		𐖭	nj	/ɲ/
	𐖈		𐖯	p	/p/
	𐖊		𐖱	r, rr	[ɾ] or [r], phonemically merged
	𐖌		𐖳	s	/s/
	𐖍		𐖴	sh	/ʃ/
	𐖎		𐖵	t	/t/
	𐕹		𐖠	f	/f/
	𐕼		𐖣	h	/h/
	𐕽		𐖤	h	/x/, /ç/
	𐕳		𐖚	c	/t͡s/
	𐕴		𐖛	ç, xh	/t͡ʃ/ and /d͡ʒ/
	𐖒		𐖹	x	/d͡z/

== Unicode ==
Vithkuqi was added to the Unicode Standard in September 2021 with the release of version 14.0.

The Unicode block for Vithkuqi is U+10570–U+105BF:

Vithkuqi^{[1]}^{[2]} Official Unicode Consortium code chart (PDF)
	0	1	2	3	4	5	6	7	8	9	A	B	C	D	E	F
U+1057x	𐕰	𐕱	𐕲	𐕳	𐕴	𐕵	𐕶	𐕷	𐕸	𐕹	𐕺		𐕼	𐕽	𐕾	𐕿
U+1058x	𐖀	𐖁	𐖂	𐖃	𐖄	𐖅	𐖆	𐖇	𐖈	𐖉	𐖊		𐖌	𐖍	𐖎	𐖏
U+1059x	𐖐	𐖑	𐖒		𐖔	𐖕		𐖗	𐖘	𐖙	𐖚	𐖛	𐖜	𐖝	𐖞	𐖟
U+105Ax	𐖠	𐖡		𐖣	𐖤	𐖥	𐖦	𐖧	𐖨	𐖩	𐖪	𐖫	𐖬	𐖭	𐖮	𐖯
U+105Bx	𐖰	𐖱		𐖳	𐖴	𐖵	𐖶	𐖷	𐖸	𐖹		𐖻	𐖼			
Notes 1.As of Unicode version 18.0 2.Grey areas indicate non-assigned code points

== See also ==
- Albanian alphabet
- Elbasan alphabet
- Todhri alphabet
- Vellara alphabet

== Bibliography ==
- Auer, Alois (1847). Die Schriftzeichen des gesammten Erdkreises.
- Cacaj-Shushka, Gjystina (1996). "Alfabeti i Naum Veqilharxhit në kontekstin ballkanik dhe evropian". Gjurmime Albanologjike (26): 189–196.
- Diringer, David (1953). The Alphabet: A Key to the History of Mankind (2nd ed.). Hutchinson's Scientific and Technical Publications.
- Dorsa, Vincenzo (1847). Su gli albanesi: ricerche e pensieri. Naples: Tipografia Trani.
- Everson, Michael (2020-12-07). "Proposal for encoding the Vithkuqi script in the SMP of the UCS" (PDF). L2/20-187R2.
- Faulmann, Carl (1880). Das Buch der Schrift enthaltend die Schriftzeichen und Alphabete aller Zeiten und aller Völker des Erdkreises. Vienna: k.k. Hof- und Staatsdruckerei.
- von Hahn, Johann Georg (1854). Albanesische Studien. Jena: Friedrich Mauke.
- Islami, Myslim (1978). Naum Veqilharxhi: ideologu i parë i Rilindjes Shqiptare. Prishtina: Rilindja.
- Qosja, Rexhep (1983). "Ëvetari (1845) i Naum Veqilharxhit dokument i rëndësishëm i Rilindjes Kombëtare". Gjurmime Albanologjike (13): 217–274.
- Rugova, Yll (2022). Tipografia shqiptare 1555–1912. Prishtina: Varg & Berk.
- Shushka, Gjystina (1994). "Sistemi grafik-fonetik i zanoreve dhe i bashkëtongëlloreve në veprën e Naum Veqilharxhit". Gjurmime Albanologjike (24): 147–160.
- Skendi, Stavro (1960). "History of the Albanian Alphabet: A Case of Complex Cultural and Political Development". Südost-Forschungen (29). Munich: 263–284.
- Skendi, Stavro (1967). The Albanian National Awakening 1878–1912. Princeton UP.
- Tetaj, Luan (2025). "Idetë iluministe të Naum Veqilharxhit". Kosova (50). Prishtina: 159–172. doi:10.62609/ks.vi50.7918.
- Veqilharxhi, Naum (1844). Fort i shkurtër e i përdorshim ëvetar shqip. Bucharest: Georg Johann Venrich.
- Veqilharxhi, Naum (1845). Fare i ri ëvetar shqip për djelm nismëtorë. Bucharest: Georg Johann Venrich.
