= Alexandros Karapanos =

Greek politician and diplomat

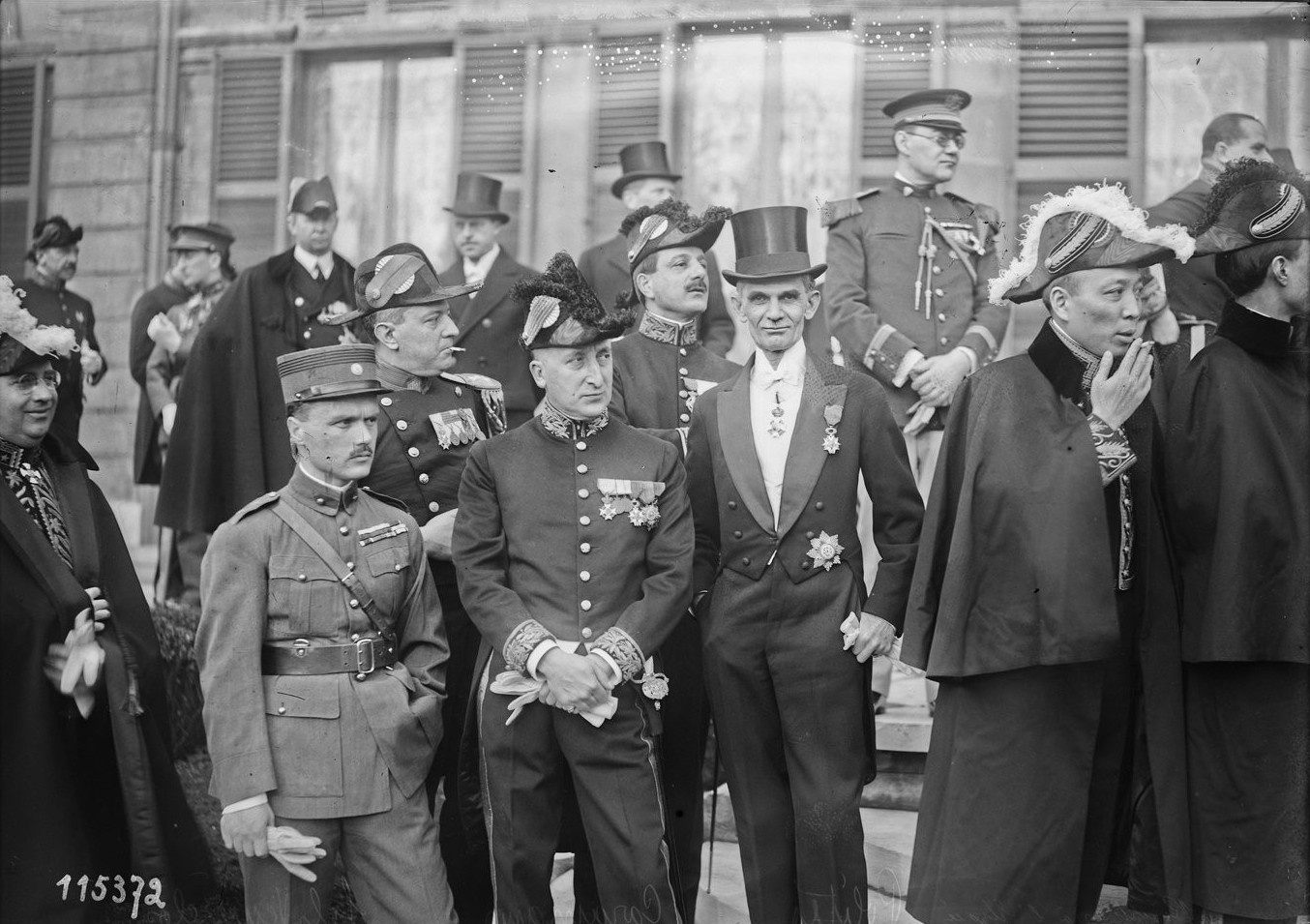
Karapanos (center, in the diplomatic uniform, between Sofoklis Venizelos and Nikolaos Politis, at a reception in the Élysée Palace in 1927

Alexandros Karapanos (Greek: Αλέξανδρος Καραπάνος, 1873–1946) was a Greek politician and diplomat. He was born in Arta (Epirus) and died in Athens.

Karapanos was the son of politician and archaeologist Konstantinos Karapanos. He studied law and political science in Paris. In 1899 he joined the Greek diplomatic corps and became the country’s ambassador in several European capitals during the following years. At the outbreak of the Balkan Wars he was appointed political-diplomatic advisor to the Army of Epirus.

In February 1914, when the Great Powers awarded the region of Northern Epirus, which had been under the control of the Greek army, to the Principality of Albania, he moved to Gjirokastër and became Minister of Foreign Affairs in the provisional autonomous government formed by the local Greek population. His relative, Georgios Christakis-Zografos, was the head of this government. After successful negotiations with the representatives of the Great Powers and William of Wied of Albania, in May the Protocol of Corfu was signed which granted full autonomy to Northern Epirus.

Karapanos became MP for Arts in the Greek elections of December 1915, and in 1916 he was appointed Minister of Foreign Affairs of the official royal government. He launched negotiations for the country’s participation with the Triple Entente in the First World War, but negotiations became deadlocked.

Karapanos participated in the Paris Peace Conference (1919) as a representative of the Northern Epirotes. In 1920 he became again an MP. Two years later, following the Asia Minor Catastrophe, he disagreed with the policies of the military revolt of September 1922, and rejected an offer to become Prime Minister of Greece.

Continuing his diplomatic activity, he was sent to Rome in 1923 to negotiate with Italy, after the Corfu incident. In 1928 he became again Minister of Foreign Affairs, in the cabinet of Eleftherios Venizelos (4 July 1928 – 7 June 1929). During this period Greece signed a number of treaties with Italy and Yugoslavia.

Alexandros Karapanos was the founder of the newspaper Elefthero Vima, which is known today as To Vima ("the tribune") and the magazine Politiki Epitheorisi ("Political Review").
