= Zographeion College =

- Ζωγράφεια Διδασκαλεία
- (now in present-day Albania); Qestorat, near Gjirokaster; Ottoman Empire

Information
- Type: Teacher Seminary
- Established: 1873
- Founder: Christakis Zografos
- Status: Defunct
- Closed: 1891
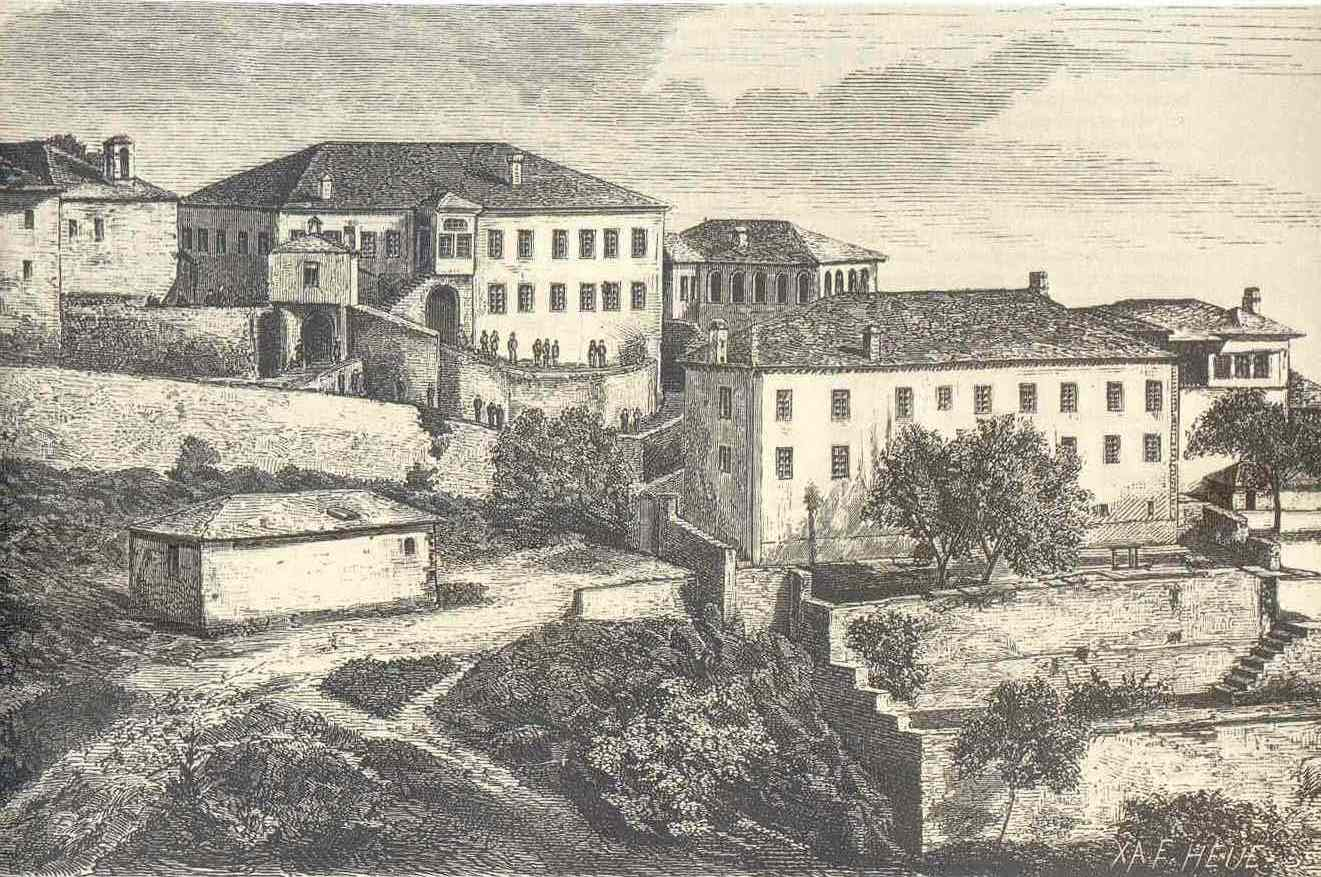
- Zographeion facilities in 1881

Zographeion College (Greek: Ζωγράφεια Διδασκαλεία) was a Greek educational institution that operated from 1873 to 1891 in the village of Qestorat, Ottoman Empire, in modern southern Albania. It was named after its sponsor Christakis Zografos. In the 18 years of its existence, it provided 400 teachers to the Greek schools of Epirus as well as to the rest of the Greek world.

== Background ==
The initiative was undertaken by the benefactor and native of Qestorat, Christakis Zografos. Zografos was at that time a distinguished businessman in the Ottoman capital, Istanbul, and sponsored the erection of various cultural and educational institutions of the local Greek communities, such as the Zographeion Lyceum in the Ottoman capital. In 1869 he founded a primary Greek school in his hometown.

== Institutions ==
The Zographeion College was established at 1873 and aimed at training teachers for the Greek schools of the wider region. The teacher's school was built next to the existing kindergarten, primary, secondary and female schools, which formed altogether an imposing structure. Most of the teachers of the Zographeion were graduates of notable Greek schools, like the Zosimaia School in Ioannina and the Phanar Greek Orthodox College in Istanbul (Constantinople).

The main goal of the institution was to provide national and religious education to the personnel that would teach to the Greek schools of the region. Moreover, Zografos provided on annual base scholarships to 60 assiduous students, 30 females and 30 males, with complete coverage of their living costs.

== Disagreements and end of operation ==
The College was a field of Greek-Albanian cultural conflict: on the one hand, Christakis Zografos, founder and supporter of the area's Greek character and the spread of Greek education and on the other hand, Koto Hoxhi, figure of the Albanian National Awakening and some local pro-Albanian circles in Ottoman administration. The latter side, supported Albanian education and launched accusations against the Zographeion, claiming that the teaching stuff was fostering anti-Ottoman rebellious activities. On the other hand, the local Greek consulate and the Orthodox Bishop of Gjirokaster supported the educational activities of the College. Finally after intervention from Zographos the Ottoman authorities allowed the institution to continue its operation.

Disagreements emerged when the newly installed Orthodox Bishop of Gjirokaster, Kosmas, accused the teaching stuff of the Zographeion to the Ottoman authorities, of being incapable to provide high level education and of anti-Ottoman activity. As a result of this situation, the Ottoman authorities closed the institution in 1891, while the death of Zografos in 1897 marked the definite end of this initiative.

Until the collapse of the Socialist Republic of Albania (1945–1989), Zografos was the subject of negative propaganda in Albanian historiography, presented as enemy of the Albania nation, while people that bore the name Zografos were persecuted by the Socialist regime. However, today this situation has changed and the College facilities have been renovated and reopened as a museum.

== Notable teachers ==
- Koto Hoxhi
- Vasileios Papachristou
