= Dryinopolis =

Historical region in southwestern Albania and northwestern Greece

Dryinopolis or Dryinoupolis (Greek: Δρυϊνόπολις or Δρυϊνούπολις) is a historical region in southwestern Albania and northwestern Greece in Epirus. The heartland of this region is the valley of the Drino (Greek: Drinos) river and Dropull/Dropolis. A Greek-Orthodox bishopric under this name was established at 449 AD as well as a theme (district) of the Byzantine Empire and the Despotate of Epirus (10th-14th century). Today the name of Dryinopolis is preserved in the local metropolitan bishopric of the Church of Greece for the Greek part of the region, while the Albanian part is under the religious jurisdiction of the metropolis of Gjirokaster of the Autocephalous Orthodox Church of Albania.

== Theme of Dryinopolis ==
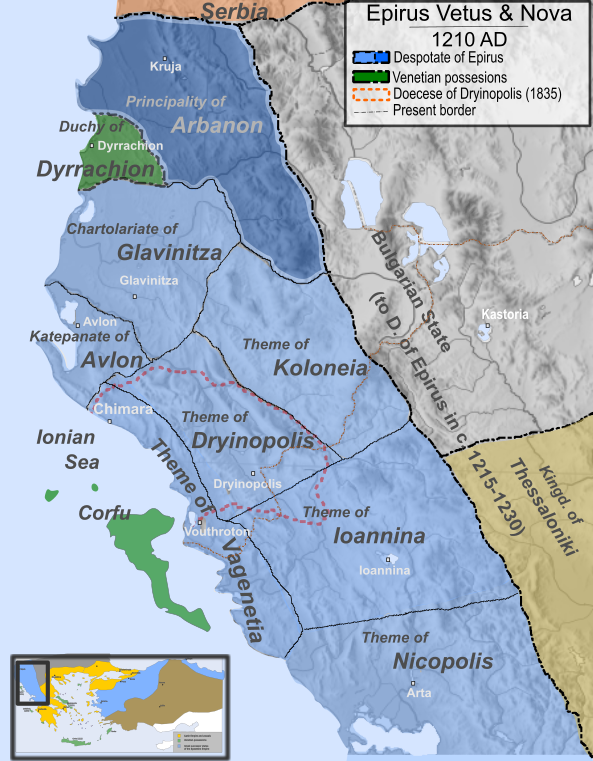
The theme of Dryinopolis as part of the Despotate of Epirus (1210) and the borders of the diocese in 1835 (red dotted line)

The region of Dryinopolis is located on the valley of Drino river. In c. 1000 it came under the control of the Bulgarian army of Samuel, but Byzantine control was restored at 1018/1019. As part of the Byzantine Empire Dryinopolis formed a minor theme during the reign of Emperor Basil II (r. 976–1025). Basil also established a garrison there under the command of a strategos.

According to the history of John Skylitzes, the creation of the theme of Dryinopolis, as well as of nearby Koloneia, and the settlement there of Byzantine prisoners of the Bulgarian army aimed at the strengthening of the Byzantine positions in Epirus against future enemy attacks from central and western Macedonia. The Bulgarian threat temporarily vanished after the annexation of the First Bulgarian Empire.

After the sack of Constantinople by the Crusaders in 1204, the region came under the control of the Despotate of Epirus, a Greek successor state of the Byzantine Empire. Dryinopolis formed one of the themes of the Despotate. During the late 14th century Dryinopolis was contested between the Despotate of Epirus and the Albanian Zenebishi clan. In 1399 the Greek population of Dryinopolis joined the Despot of Epirus, Esau, in his campaign against various Albanian and Aromanian tribesmen. Prior to the Ottoman conquest of the region in 1418, it was controlled by John Zenebishi (1411-1418).

== Ecclesiastical diocese ==
=== Byzantine period ===
The bishopric of Dryinopolis was already established at 449 AD and its bishop participated in the proceedings of the Ecumenical Council of Ephesus. It was initially under the jurisdiction of the Metropolis of Nicopolis, while later it was a suffragan of the Metropolis of Ioannina.

Its seat was initially located in Adrianoupolis on the Drino Valley. After its destruction by the Ostrogoths of Totila in the 6th century, it was transferred to nearby Episkopi (modern village of Peshkepi). In c. 1020 it was part of the Archbishopric of Ohrid. In 1185 after the destruction of the town of Episkopi by the Normans, the seat was moved to Gardiq in Cepo region and in early 15th century it was transferred to Argyrokastron (modern Gjirokastër).

=== Ottoman period ===
The menaion of the bishopric records that a number of Sipahi soldiers were registered by the Ottomans in the region during the first decades of Ottoman rule. In the same period, according to a local chronicle, Islamization attempts and massacres were perpetrated by the Ottoman units which stopped after the Fall of Constantinople to the Ottomans (1453). During the prelacy of bishop Dositheos (1760–1799) a total of 70 churches were erected and extensively repaired.

The bishopric of Dryinopolis was part of the metropolis of Ioannina under the jurisdiction of the Ecumenical Patriarchate of Constantinople. In 1832 it was merged with the nearby Diocese of Cheimarra and in 1835 it was promoted to a metropolitan bishopric.

=== Modern period ===
After the defeat of the Ottoman Empire in the Balkan Wars (1912-1913) the metropolitan bishop of Dryinopolis, Vasileios, presided at the Pan-Epirotic conference that organized the defense of Northern Epirus against possible attacks by Albanian units. Later in 1914 Vasileios participated together with the rest of the local Orthodox metropolitan bishops in the formation of the provisional government of Northern Epirus. During World War I the region came under the control of the Italian army (1917) which implemented anti-Greek policies and expelled Vasileios from the region.

The metropolitan bishopric was vacant with the incorporation of most of the region in the Albanian state. In 1937, with the official recognition of the Autocephalous Orthodox Church of Albania, the Metropolis of Gjirokaster was founded. The later consisted of the areas of Dryinopolis that belonged to the Albanian state. The Greek part of the region came under the religious jurisdiction of the Church of Greece and the Metropolis of Dryinopolis, Pogoniani and Konitsa, which preserved the older name.

== Sources ==
- Ellis, Steven G.; Hálfdanarson, Guðmundur; Isaacs, Ann Katherine (2006). Citizenship in Historical Perspective. Plus. ISBN 9788884924063.
- Ellis, Steven G.; Klusáková, Lud'a (2007). Imagining Frontiers, Contesting Identities. Edizioni Plus. ISBN 9788884924667.
- Filareti, Pappa (2014). Η ορθόδοξη πίστη στην Αλβανία από την απελευθέρωση της χώρας το 1912 έως το 1944. [Orthodox Faith in Albania from Independence in 1912 to 1944] (in Greek). Thessaloniki: dspace.lib.uom.gr University of Macedonia.
- Giakoumis, Georgios (2009). Δύο Πρώιμα Μετα-Βυζαντινά Μνημεία και ο Ζωγραφικός τους Διάκοσμος στο Πωγώνι [Two Early Post-Byzantine Monuments and their Internal Environment in Pogoni] (pdf) (in Greek). University of Ioannina. doi:10.12681/eadd/25277. (PhD Thesis)
- Hammond, Nicholas Geoffrey Lemprière (1976). Migrations and Invasions in Greece and Adjacent Areas. Noyes Press. p. 61. ISBN 9780815550471.
- Iakovidis, Savas, Charalampos (2011). "Το αυτονομιστικό κίνημα στη Βόρεια Ήπειρο (1914) [The Movement for Autonomy in Northern Epirus (1914)]". www.didaktorika.gr. Aristotle University of Thessaloniki.
- Nicol, Donald M. (1984). The Despotate of Epiros 1267-1479: A Contribution to the History of Greece in the Middle Ages. Cambridge University Press. ISBN 9780521261906.
- Prinzing, G. (1997). Byzantine Epirus: Political, Social and Economic Developments (in Epirus 4000 years of Greek History and Civilization). Athens: Ekdotike Athenon. p. 191. ISBN 9789602133712.
- Schmitt, Oliver Jens (2010). Religion und Kultur im albanischsprachigen Südosteuropa. Peter Lang. ISBN 9783631602959.
- Strässle, Paul Meinrad (2006). Krieg und Kriegführung in Byzanz: die Kriege Kaiser Basileios' II. gegen die Bulgaren (976-1019) (in German). Böhlau Verlag Köln Weimar. ISBN 9783412174057.
- Tritos, Michael (1997). "History of Orthodoxy: History of the Autocephalous Orthodox Church of Albania". 7 Ημέρες, Kathimerini: 3.
