= Northern Epirote Declaration of Independence =

1914 declaration of independence

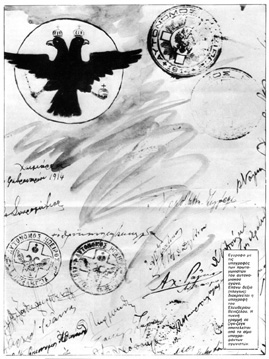
- Part of the Declaration of Independence document
- Date: February 28 – March 2, 1914
- Location: Gjirokastër (Argyrokastro), Autonomous Republic of Northern Epirus (Albania)
- Participants: Delegates of the "Panepirotic Assembly of Argyrokastro"
- Outcome: Establishment of the Provisional Government of Northern Epirus, Armed uprising of "Northern Epirus" against incorporation into Albania, Protocol of Corfu

The Northern Epirote Declaration of Independence occurred on February 28, 1914, as a reaction to the incorporation of Northern Epirus into the newly established Principality of Albania. The region of Northern Epirus, which corresponds to modern-day southern Albania, came under the control of the Greek forces during the Balkan Wars of 1912–13. However, the subsequent Protocol of Florence assigned it to the newly established Albanian state, a decision that was rejected by the local Greek population. As the Greek army withdrew to the new border, a Panepirotic Assembly was organized by the representatives of Northern Epirus in Gjirokastër (Greek: Argyrokastro). Given the fact that union of Northern Epirus with Greece had already been dismissed by the European Great Powers, they decided that only autonomy or alternatively an international occupation would be appropriate for the region. Finally, Georgios Christakis-Zografos, the head of the assembly, declared the independence of the Autonomous Republic of Northern Epirus.

Zografos proclaimed that the aspirations of the people of Northern Epirus were overlooked since the Great Powers had dismissed the idea of self-government within the Albanian state. After negotiations between Albanian and Northern Epirote representatives in early May, and with the mediation of the Great Powers, the Protocol of Corfu was signed. The agreement recognized Northern Epirus as an autonomous and self-governing region of Albania under the suzerainty of the Albanian prince, while also acknowledging the Greek character of the area. However, due to political instability in Albania at that time, the protocol was never put into effect.

== Background ==
During the First Balkan War (1912-1913), the Greek Army breached the Ottoman defences in the Epirus front and advanced further north. Thus, after the end of the war Greece controlled the historical region of Epirus. However the Treaty of London (May 1913) and the Protocol of Florence (December 1913) awarded the northern part to the newly established Principality of Albania. This area which roughly coincided to the former Ottoman provinces (sanjaks) of Ergiri and Görice, became then known by the Greeks as Northern Epirus (Greek: Βόρειος Ήπειρος Voreios Ipiros'). This decision by the European Great Powers was unpopular among the local Greek population.

By the terms of the Protocol of Florence, the Greek government was obliged to evacuate its forces from the area to the new Greco-Albanian border line. The Greek government however raised concerns about the evacuation process of the Greek forces, pointing out to the Great Powers that the newly established Albanian state was unable to secure the region immediately. In particular the Greek government and the local population feared the possibility of reprisals and atrocities at the hands of Albanian irregular groups. In order to arrange the details of the evacuation with the International Commission of Control, an organization set up by the Great Powers to secure peace and stability in the region, the Greek prefect of Corfu moved to Vlorë, where the provisional government of Albania was based. Meanwhile, the Greek authorities reassured the local Greek population that the Greek government would undertake initiatives to secure for them recognition of minority status and rights in Albanian legislation. The Greek authorities also warned the population of the town of Korçë (Greek: Korytsa) that any action against incorporation into Albania would be fruitless. They also insisted that the Greek army would only hand over control of the region to regular Albanian units led by Dutch officers from the International Commission, whereas the Greek forces would fire upon any irregular Albanian bands who attempted to enter the region.

== Panepirotic Assembly ==
Before the evacuation of the Greek Army began, an assembly of representatives of Northern Epirus, the "Panepirotic Assembly of Argyrokastro" (Greek: Πανηπειρωτική Συνδιάσκεψη Αργυροκάστρου), took place on 13 February 1914 at Gjirokaster (Greek: Argyrokastro). Given the fact that unification of Northern Epirus with Greece had already been dismissed by the Great Powers, the assembly decided that they would only accept local autonomy, or failing that, an international occupation. They also declared that the population of Northern Epirus felt betrayed by the official Greek government, which not only refused to provide arms, but also agreed to withdraw gradually in order to allow the Albanian forces to proceed with the occupation of Northern Epirus.

The Assembly triggered a series of events. Georgios Christakis-Zografos, a former Greek foreign minister and native of the region, arrived at Gjirokaster and discussed the situation with the local representatives. In order to ensure the protection of the local population, Zografos proposed three options to the European Powers for Northern Epirus: full autonomy under the nominal sovereignty of the Prince of Albania, extensive administrative or cantonal-type autonomy with a gendarmerie recruited exclusively among locals, or a period of direct control by the Great Powers for such time until foreign troops could be withdrawn without endangering the local populace. The Northern Epirote representatives also demanded formal recognition of the particular educational and religious rights of the local Greek Orthodox population. Moreover, for the coastal region of Himara, the Assembly claimed the same privileges and autonomous status it had enjoyed during the Ottoman era. On February 22, Zografos sent a note to the representatives of the Great Powers where he addressed the present situation:

The Panepirotic Assembly gathered in Argyrokastro has charged us to request that you agree to call the attention of your Governments to the condition created for the Greek Orthodox Christians who have been put in Albania's possession by the declaration of the Powers.
The populace of Epirus truly believed it had the right to hope that Europe, tearing it away from Greece and stripping it of the freedom it had enjoyed for more than a year, would at least think to safeguard its existence and its ethnic heritage it was able to preserve intact through five centuries of harsh tyranny.

Such being the new State's composition in being made up of so many heterogeneous elements and without ethnic and religious cohesion, a special organization was required by it to be capable of dispelling misgivings, of safeguarding property, of mediating the aspirations of the now divided and mutually hostile elements and of allowing them to develop in peace and safety.
Nevertheless, we believe it is impossible for Europe to be ignorant of the fate that awaits the Greek populace it wishes to hand over to Albania—a populace whose number, according even to Ottoman statistics, is greater than 130,000 and which comprises the majority in the areas sacrificed...

Under these conditions and in the absence of a solution that would suffice to safeguard Epirus, a solution it would have been otherwise easy to discover, the Epirote populace is forced to declare to the Powers that it cannot submit to their decision. It will declare its independence and will struggle for its existence, its traditions and its rights.

The following week a number of cities declared their autonomy: Himara, Gjirokaster, Sarandë (Agioi Saranta) and Delvinë (Delvino).

== Declaration ==
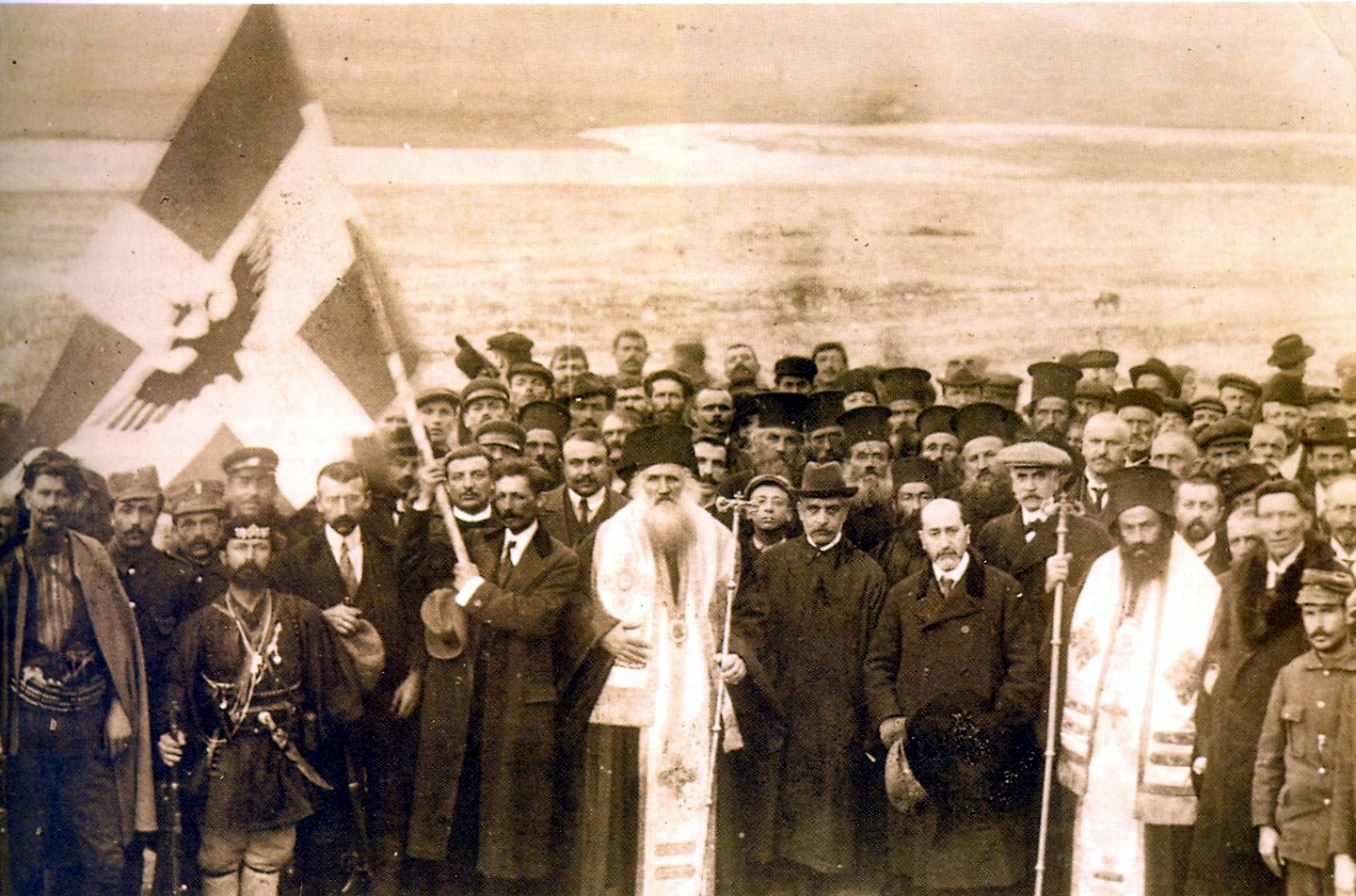
Picture of the official ceremony of the declaration in Gjirokastër, March 1, 1914.

Consequently, on 28 February 1914, the Autonomous Republic of Northern Epirus was declared and a provisional government was formed to support the state's objectives. Christakis-Zografos himself became president of the provisional government. In a proclamation to the people of Northern Epirus, Zografos maintained that their aspirations had been ignored, that the Great Powers had even denied them self-government within the Albanian state, as well as guarantees for the protection of life, property, religious freedom and of their national existence. The proclamation also called upon the Epirotes to make every sacrifice defending the integrity of Northern Epirus and its liberties from any attack whatsoever:

Epirotes:
Gathered in Argyrokastro, the Constituent Assembly of the delegates summoned by the will of the people has declared the formation of the Autonomous State of Northern Epirus, comprising the provinces the Greek Army is forced to abandon...

The declaration was also signed by the heads of the local Greek Orthodox metropolitan bishoprics: Vasileios of Dryinoupolis, Spyridon of Vela and Konitsa and Germanos of Korytsa. On the day of the declaration, Zografos notified the International Control Commission of his appointment as president of the provisional government and announced that the Epirotes would regard any attempt by the newly founded Albanian Gendarmerie to cross their border as an act of hostility and would resist it. The Autonomous Northern Epirus also included Himara, Delvino, Sarandë, and Përmet (Premeti).

On the same day, Zografos sent a telegram to Korçë urging the people to follow the example of the rest of the Northern Epirotes. However, on March 1, under the terms of the Protocol of Florence the town surrendered to the Albanian Gendarmerie. The Greek Prime Minister, Eleftherios Venizelos, immediately ordered the withdrawal and handover of the nearby region of Kolonjë to the Albanian units, before the population could join the uprising too. As a result, bishop Spyridon, who planned to become the head of the autonomy movement in this region, was arrested and expelled by the Greek authorities.

In his speech on 2 March, Zografos concluded that the Northern Epirotes, after five centuries of Ottoman occupation, would not accept the destiny which the Powers had imposed upon them. The following days Alexandros Karapanos became Minister of Foreign Affairs and Dimitrios Doulis Minister of War of the provisional government. Doulis, a native of Northern Epirus, had earlier resigned from his post as a Colonel of the Greek Army and joined the revolutionary forces of Northern Epirus. The Northern Epirote army reached the number of 5,000 men from the first days of its formation. The army's core consisted mainly of former members of the Greek Army, some of whom were of local Epirote ancestry. With the support of irregular volunteer units it reached a total manpower of approximately 10,000.

== Reactions ==
=== In Greece ===
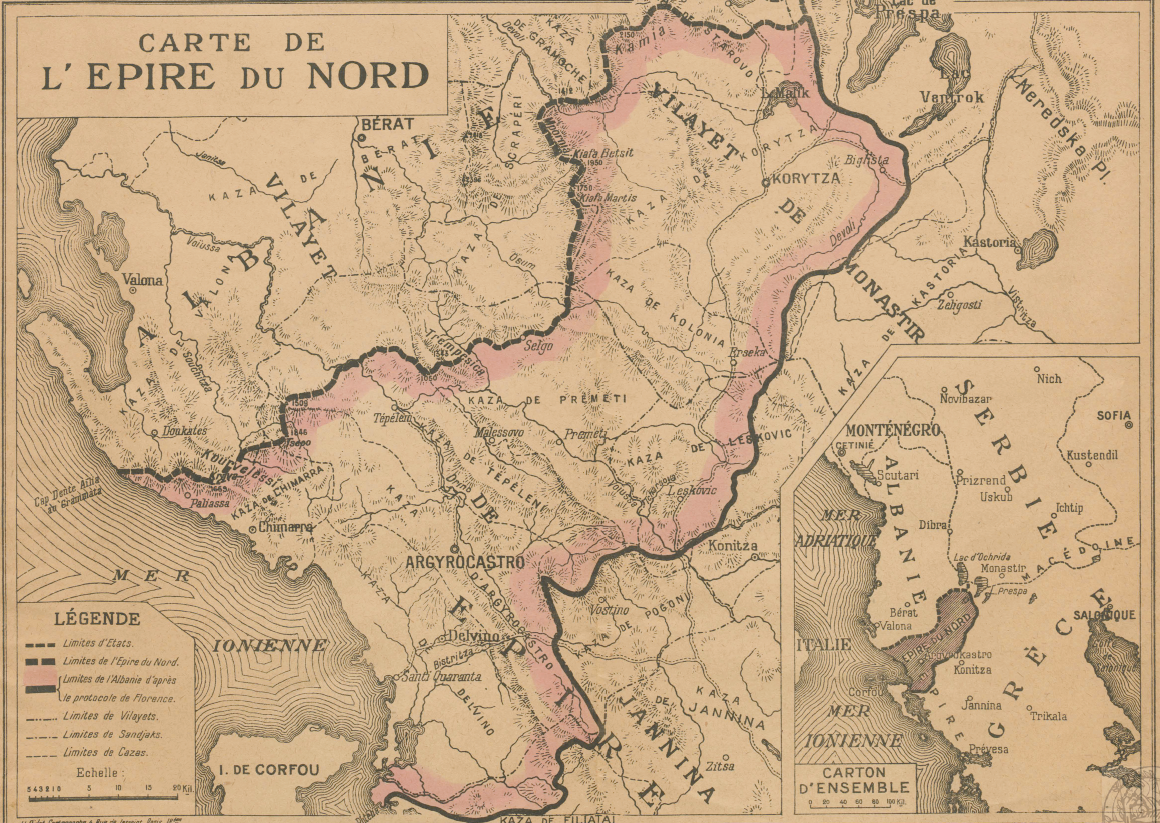
Map of Northern Epirus presented to the Paris Peace Conference of 1919, by the exiled provisional government of Northern Epirus

The Greek Army continued with the evacuation of the region, but the process slowed down out of fear that a hasty withdrawal might offer the opportunity to irregular bands to carry out atrocities against the civilian population. As the official position of the Greek government towards the uprising was that of strict neutrality, Prime Minister Venizelos ordered the blockade of the port of Sarandë and prohibited a demonstration in Athens in favor of the uprising. However, it cannot be doubted that the Greek government sympathized with the demands of the Northern Epirotes. In fact, the only way for Venizelos to stop the uprising would have been to declare martial law in the region, but this action would have caused major political instability and the possible resignation of his government. The opposition parties in Greece even accused Venizelos of going beyond what was required of him to comply with the decision of the Great Powers, and instead of simply evacuating the districts, he was handing them over to the Albanians and depriving the Epirotes of any means of resistance.

=== Diplomatic and military developments ===
On the other hand, the Albanian government, unable to deal with the Northern Epirus movement, requested that the Great Powers take measures. The Albanian government claimed that although the Greek Army was evacuating the region, it was being replaced by guerrilla fighters organized by the Greek authorities. Meanwhile, on March 7, 1914, Prince William of Wied arrived in Albania and immediately ordered the Dutch colonel Lodewijk Thomson to negotiate with the Northern Epirote representatives. Thompson met with Karapanos on March 10, and proposed a limited local administration for Northern Epirus under a Christian governor in addition to guarantees of religious and educational rights. Thompson's initiative was dismissed by the Northern Epirote side.

On April 11, Epirote revolutionaries took control of Korçë, but four days later the Albanian Gendarmerie, led by Dutch officers, recaptured the city. As a result, the Dutch arrested and expelled the Greek Orthodox bishop Germanos, since they had proof that he was the chief instigator of the uprising, as well as other members of the town council. After the complete withdrawal of the Greek Army from the region on April 28, conflicts between the Northern Epirote forces and Albanian gendarmes broke out in several locations. Intense fighting occurred in the region of Cepo, north of Gjirokastër, where Albanian gendarmerie units tried unsuccessfully to infiltrate southwardly, facing resistance from the Northern Epirote forces. On the other hand, the Epirotes managed to advance and gain control of Erseka and further advanced on Frashër and Korçë.

By early May, the Albanian authorities, being unable to suppress the movement in Northern Epirus, became willing to start discussions with the intervention of the International Commission. Thus, Prince William of Wied of Albania asked the Commission, which represented the Albanian government, to initiate negotiations. The latter, in order to avoid a major escalation of the armed conflicts with disastrous results, decided to intervene. On May 7, Zografos received a communication to initiate negotiations on a new basis and accepted the proposal. Thus, an armistice was ordered the next day.

== Aftermath ==
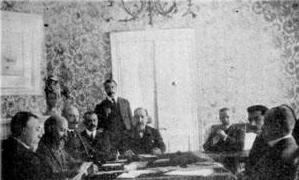
Picture of the negotiations that led to the Protocol of Corfu.

The representatives of both sides met for negotiations in Sarandë, but the final negotiations took place in the nearby island of Corfu, Greece. Finally, on May 17, 1914, the representatives of Northern Epirus and Albania signed an agreement that granted the chief demands of the Epirotes and became known as the Protocol of Corfu. According to this agreement, Northern Epirus, which consisted of the regions surrounding the cities of Gjirokastër and Korçë would be an autonomous, fully self-governing part of Albania under the suzerainty of the Albanian prince.

In general, the Protocol recognized the Greek character of the region, and the Greek language acquired an official status there, next to the Albanian one. The main demands of the Northern Epirote government were accepted. However, a number of issues were not granted, in particular the extension of the area in which the Greek population would enjoy education in its native language in the regions around Vlorë and Durrës (in central Albania, to the north of Northern Epirus), the appointment of Greek Orthodox higher officials in the main towns of the autonomous area and the exemption from military service of the local population, even in time of war.

However, the Protocol was never implemented due to political instability in Albania. On 27 October, after approval from the Great Powers, the Greek army re-entered Northern Epirus. The Provisional Government of Northern Epirus formally ceased to exist, declaring that it accomplished its mission.

In 1916 due to the developments of World War I Italian and French troops evicted the Greek army from the area. In 1921 it was finally ceded to Albania, while the Albanian Prime Minister recognized a number of the Greek minority's rights, which were soon ignored. As a result, most of the Greek schools were forced to close and Greek education was allowed only in certain areas.

== Sources ==
- Boeckh, Katrin (1996). Von den Balkankriegen zum Ersten Weltkrieg: Kleinstaatenpolitik und ethnische Selbstbestimmung auf dem Balkan (in German). Oldenbourg Wissenschaftsverlag. p. 418. ISBN 978-3-486-56173-9.
- Tara Ashley O' Brien. Manufacturing Homogeneity in the Modern Albanian Nation-Building Project. University of Budapest, 2008.
- Kondis, Basil (1976). Greece and Albania: 1908-1914 (Thesis). Thessaloniki: Institute for Balkan Studies, New York University. doi:10.12681/eadd/4724. hdl:10442/hedi/4724.
- Miller, William (1966). Ottoman Empire and its Successors, 1801-1927. Routledge. ISBN 978-0-7146-1974-3.
- Sakellariou, M. V. (1997). Epirus, 4000 years of Greek history and civilization. Ekdotike Athenon. p. 480. ISBN 978-960-213-371-2.
- Stickney, Edith Pierpont (1926). Southern Albania or Northern Epirus in European International Affairs, 1912–1923. Stanford University Press. ISBN 978-0-8047-6171-0.
