= Christakis Zografos =

Ottoman Greek banker and benefactor

Christakis Zografos Efendi
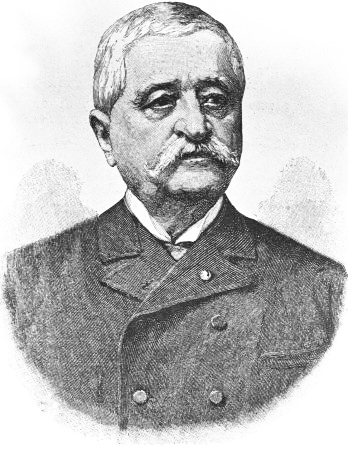
- Portrait of Christakis Zografos
- Born: 1820; Qestorat, Ottoman Empire (now in Albania)
- Died: August 19, 1898 (aged 77); Paris, France
- Occupation: Banker
- Known for: Philanthropy

Christakis Zografos (Greek: Χρηστάκης Ζωγράφος, Turkish: Hristaki Zoğrafos Efendi, Albanian: Kristaq Zografi; 1820 – 19 August 1898) was an Ottoman Greek banker, benefactor and one of the distinguished personalities of the Greek community of Constantinople (modern Istanbul).

== Early life and career ==
Zografos was born in the village of Qestorat in southern Albania, when the region was under Ottoman rule. He is described as being either an expatriate Greek, or being of Albanian descent.

He attended the Zosimaia School in Ioannina and then went to Constantinople to join his father's business there. He was initially a co-partner in a small money changing stand at Galata. During 1854–1881, Zografos became one of the major creditors of the Ottoman state. He also became one of its leading bankers and financiers and president of the Ottoman capital's trolley company. He was awarded by three sultans, sat on the Imperial Board of Estimate and served as president of the Ecumenical Patriarchate's Clerico-Lay Advisory Board. Because of his high social status he was widely known as Christakis Efendi (Lord Christakis).

In the 1860s, Zografos was part of a committee of Albanian intellectuals and other personalities approved by Grand Vizier Ali Pasha to choose an alphabet for the Albanian language. After elaborations, they chose a mostly Latin alphabet with some Greek letters, though the authorities did not accept it.

Following the Fire of Pera in 1870, Zoğrafos bought the damaged Naum Theatre and had it rebuilt as what is now the Çiçek Pasajı.

Zografos was known as Sultan Murad V's personal jeweller. After the successful coup against Sultan Abdülaziz, he was entrusted with the sultan's jewellery collection, as it was assumed it would not fetch its true value in Constantinople. Zografos was sent to France to try and sell it and never returned to the city.

== Philanthropy ==
Zografos lavishly endowed educational and other facilities for the Greek communities living in regions that belonged, at that time, to the Ottoman Empire.

He offered large sums of money for the establishment of two middle schools in Constantinople: one in Beyoğlu (Pera), the other a school for girls in Yeniköy on the Bosphorus. Both were called Zographeion Lyceum in his memory. He also sponsored the rebuilding of a Greek library in the city and gave 1,000-franc endowments to the universities of Munich and Paris for awards in the fields of Greek literature and history.

In his birthplace he founded another Zographeion College where the male and female graduates became Greek language teachers. Zografos also offered annual scholarships to 60 students (30 females and 30 males) from poor families to cover their living costs while they studied.

Other grants went to the Patriarchate's Halki seminary on Heybeliada (Halki). In recognition he was awarded the Gold Cross of the Ecumenical Patriarch Joachim II.

Zografos supported Hellenism by funding Greek schools, and at the same time he promoted the use of the Albanian language in the elementary schools that he financed. His daughter married Koto Hoxhi, who taught Albanian at the school of Qestorat.

His son Georgios Christakis-Zografos became a notable diplomat, politician and head of the Autonomous Republic of Northern Epirus (1914).

== Legacy ==
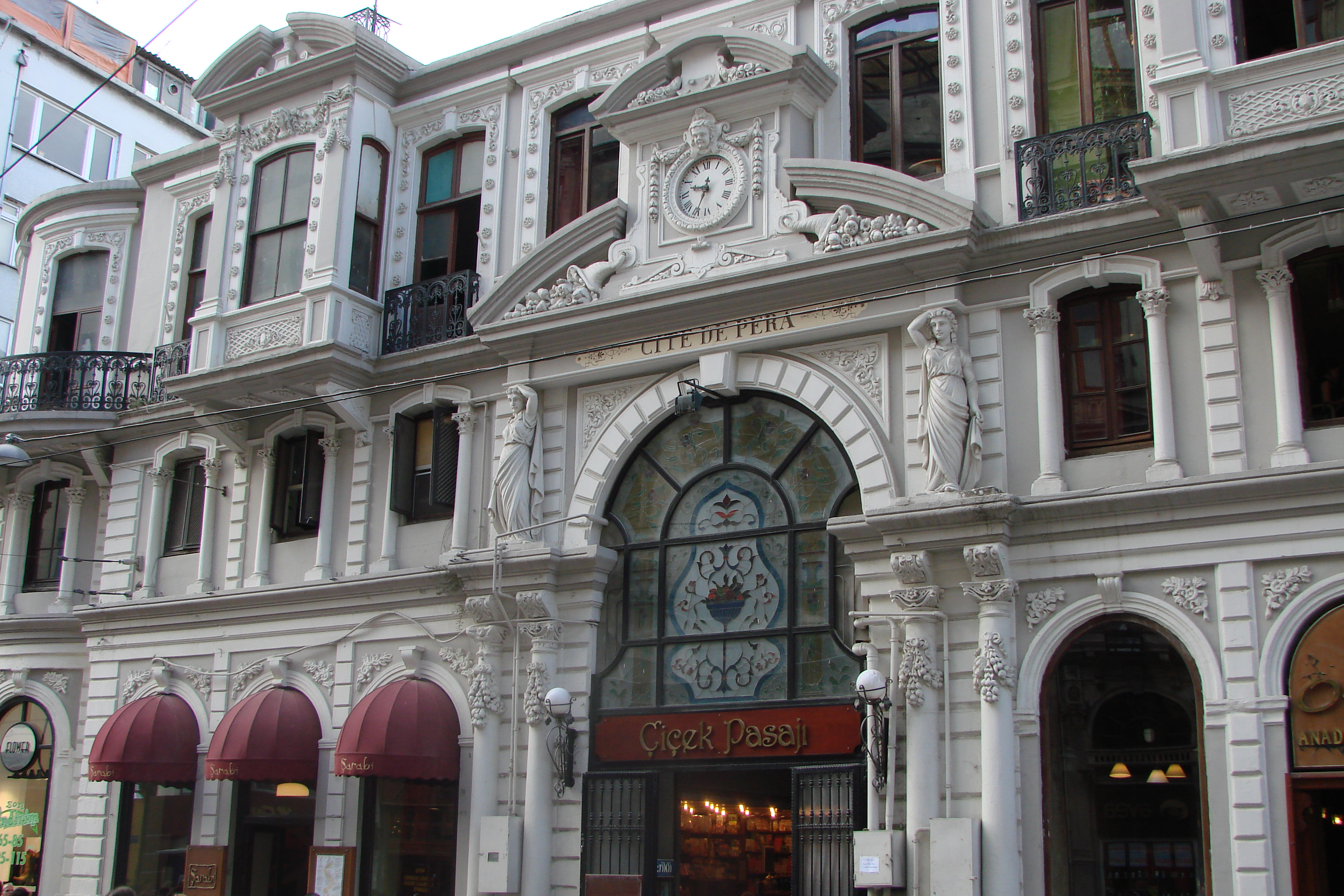
The main entrance of Çiçek Pasajı (Cité de Péra) on İstiklal Avenue

Under the Communist regime in Albania (1945–1992), Zografos and his son were labelled 'enemies of the state'. Anyone from his home town who held the name Zografos, whether they were related or not, was also persecuted. After 1992, however, the situation changed and today the Zographeion school in Qestorati has been renovated and reopened as a museum.

== See also ==
- Zographeion Lyceum
- Zographeion College
- Çiçek Pasajı
- Ottoman Greeks

== Sources ==
- Pepelasis Minoglou, Ioanna (October 2002). "Ethnic minority groups in international banking: Greek diaspora bankers of Constantinople and Ottoman state finances, c. 1840–81". Financial History Review (PDF). 9 (2): 125–146. doi:10.1017/S0968565002000112. S2CID 154756950.
- Ruches, Pyrrhus J. (1967). Albanian historical folksongs 1716-1943. Argonaut Inc.
- Seni, Nora (November 1994). "The Camondos and Their Imprint on 19th-Century Istanbul" (PDF). International Journal of Middle East Studies. 26 (4): 663–675. doi:10.1017/s002074380006116x. JSTOR 163808. S2CID 162792425.
