= Vasileios of Dryinoupolis =

Greek bishop

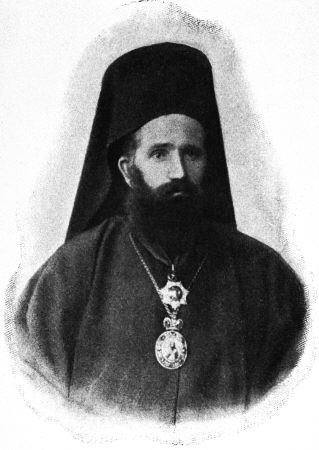

Bishop Vasileios of Dryinoupolis (Greek: Βασίλειος Δρυϊνουπόλεως; 1858-1936; born Vasileios Papachristou, Βασίλειος Παπαχρήστου) was a Greek metropolitan bishop, scholar, important figure of the Northern Epirus movement and member of the provisional Government of Northern Epirus (1914).

== Scholar and religious figure ==
His family originated from the village of Hormovë which was destroyed by the Ottoman Albanian ruler Ali Pasha at the end of the 18th century. Vasileios was born in Labovë e Kryqit (Labovë of the Cross) in Gjirokastër District (in present-day southern Albania) at 1858. He studied theology at the Halki seminary.

Later, he was appointed professor at the Zographeion College in Qestorat where he taught Theology, Greek, Turkish, Latin and French. During the same time he was appointed at the local metropolitan bishopric of Argyrokastron and Dryinopolis. In 1888, he was the appointed professor of the Greek Gymnasium in Serres, Macedonia and in 1890 in Adrianople. In 1895, he ascended to the post of Megas Protosyncellus of the Ecumenical Patriarchate of Constantinople.

In 1897, he was appointed metropolitan bishop of Belegrada (based in Berat), where he contributed to the foundation of several Greek schools and the one religious seminary in Berat. Vasileios also offered annual base scholarships to students that came from poor families, with complete coverage of their living costs. Later in 1909, he was appointed metropolitan bishop of Argyrokastron (full title Argyrokastro, Dryinopolis, Delvino, Himara and Pogoni; encompassing modern southwest Albania), centred in Gjirokastër. There he continued his activity with the foundation of various educational, religious and cultural institutions in the area.

== Northern Epirus struggle (1913-1916) ==
He became one of the protagonists and a local hero during the struggle against the annexation of the area to the newly established Principality of Albania (1913-1914). In February 1914, Vasileios participated in the declaration of the Autonomous Republic of Northern Epirus and signed the declaration of Autonomy as a member of the provisional Government under Georgios Christakis-Zografos. In the following months he was named Minister of Justice and Religion.

In September 1916, Italian troops entered the region, closed down all Greek institutions and expelled Vasileios to Greece. Vasileios protested to the Greek Prime Minister, Eleftherios Venizelos, against his unprovoked expulsion. Following the Greco-Turkish War, Northern Epirus was acquired by Albania in 1921, further preventing his return.
