= Zografeion Lyceum =

Coordinates: 41°02′00″N 28°58′47″E

Özel Zoğrafyon Rum Lisesi
- Ζωγράφειον Λύκειον
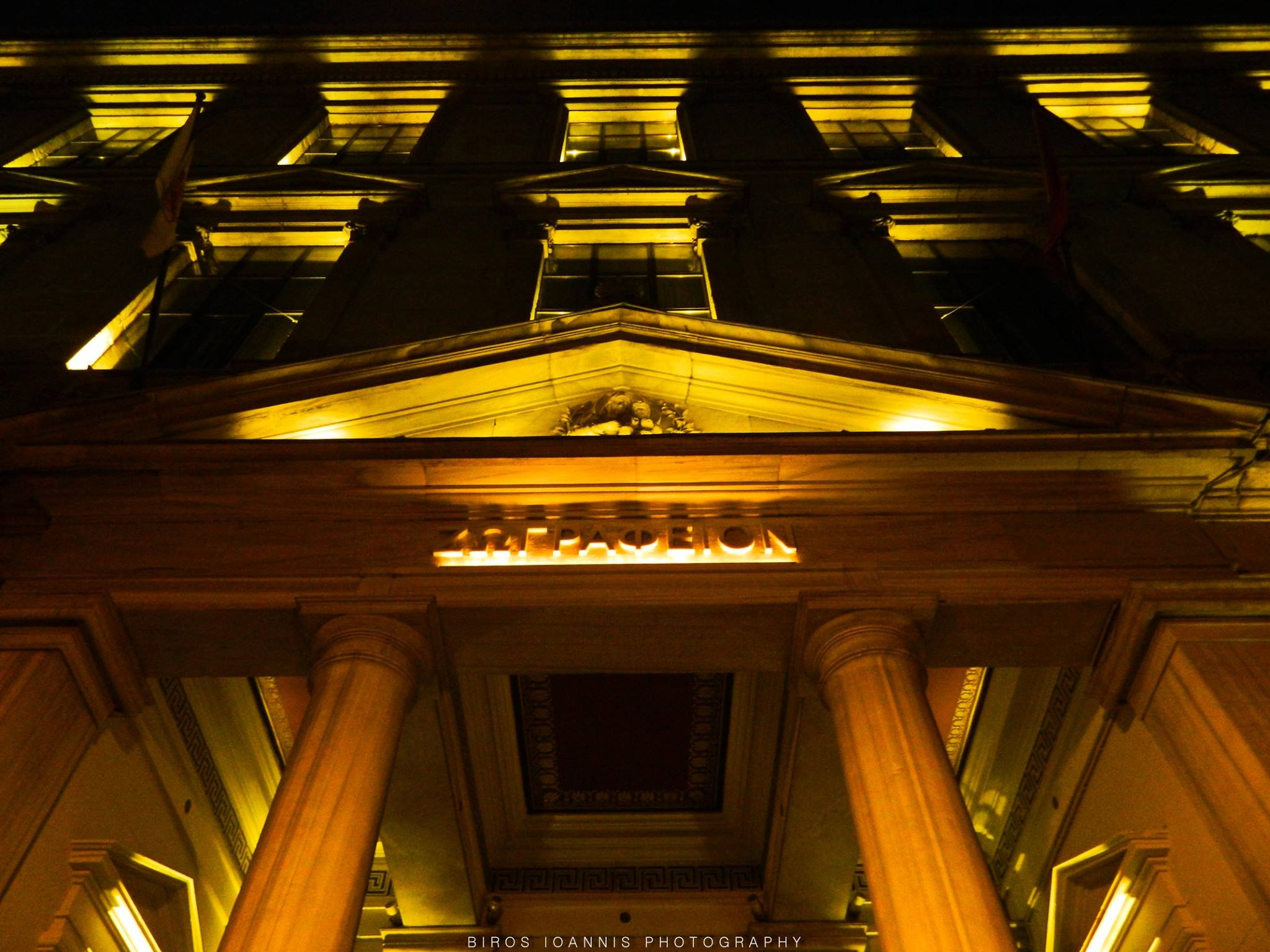
- Istanbul; Turkey

Information
- Type: Private school
- Status: open
- School district: Beyoğlu
- Principal: Yani Demircioğlu
- Website: http://www.zografyon.com/

Zografeion Lyceum or Zografyon Lyceum (Turkish: Özel Zoğrafyon Rum Lisesi, Greek: Ζωγράφειον Λύκειον) is one of the remaining open Greek schools in Istanbul. The school is in the Istanbul city centre in the Beyoğlu district and very close to the Taksim Square, which is considered the heart of the city.

== History ==
The school was founded in the late 19th century, as the growing number of Greek students proved to be more than the Zappeion and Panayia schools could accommodate; in particular, the School of Panayia (Σταυροδρόμι της Παναγίας) had more than 800 pupils. The community decided to build a new school, and donations were collected from a number of people. Christakis Zografos, who was living in Paris at the time, made the largest contribution, of 10,000 gold liras. In 1890, the Greek community decided that the school be renamed after Zografos. An architectural competition was held, choosing a design by Pericles Fotiades. The school was inaugurated in 1893 and its first alumni were graduated in 1899.

== The school ==
The school, like all minority schools in Turkey, is a secular school. The years that followed its openings, the school developed to a particularly active school and always had more than 250 pupils. Especially before the Istanbul Pogrom in 1955 and the expulsion of Greeks in 1964, the number pupils were above 350. In October 1999, the school was the target of a small scale sonic blast by Turkish left-wing extremists to condemn "Turkey's international position as a -Satellite- of the USA". Many famous artists, architects, politicians and theologians of the Greek diaspora have studied at the school, including Patriarch Bartholomew I of Constantinople. Today the school has no more than 45 pupils and 20 teachers. The school (like all minority schools, as it is compulsory by law) applies the full Turkish curriculum in addition to Greek subjects: Greek language, literature and religion.

== See also ==
- Patriarch Bartholomew I of Constantinople
- Greeks in Turkey
- Phanar Greek Orthodox College
- List of schools in Istanbul
