= Koto Hoxhi =

Albanian activist

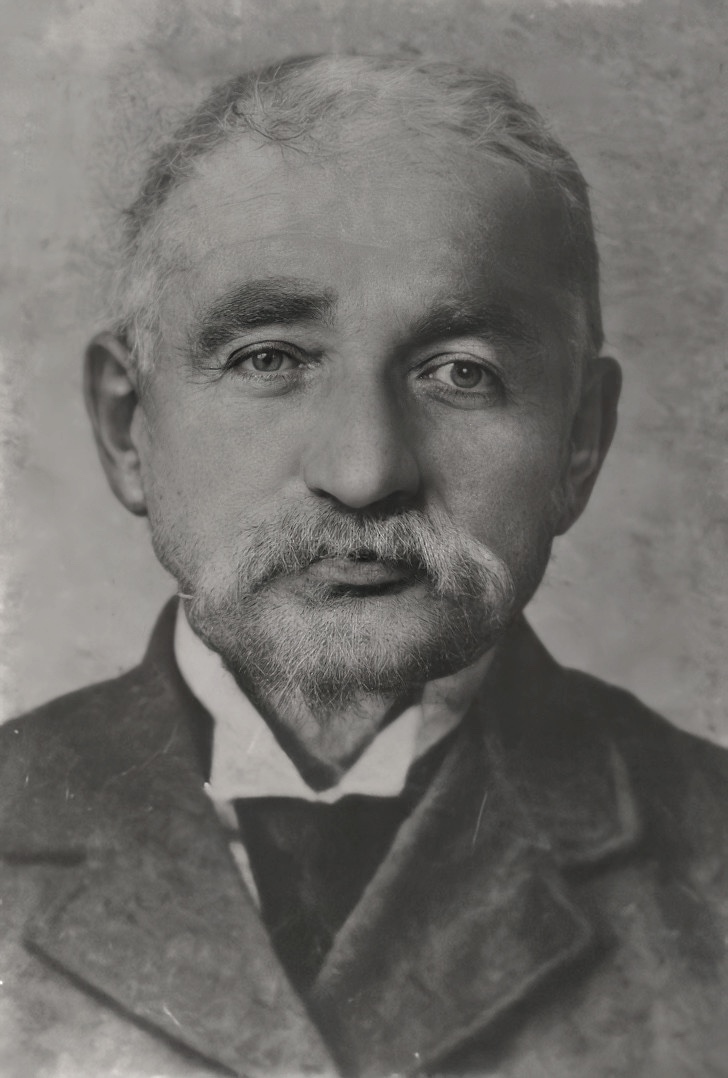
- Born: 1824; Qestorat, Gjirokaster County, Albania (then Ottoman Empire)
- Died: 1895 (aged 70–71); Istanbul, Ottoman Empire (modern Turkey)
- Occupations: Dramaturg, Teacher
- Writing career
- Notable awards: Honor of the Nation
- Movement: Albanian National Awakening

Konstandin Hoxhi, known as Koto Hoxhi (1824–1895) was an advocate of the Albanian language. He taught the language secretly to his students in Qestorat in Southern Albania. He was imprisoned and died in prison for his beliefs.

== Biography ==
Koto Hoxhi was born in Qestorat in 1824 (Gjirokastër District, southern Albania, then Ottoman Empire). He and Sami Frashëri, Vaso Pasha and Jani Vreto devised an alphabet for expressing the Albanian language. Based on this it was possible to create the first alphabet book in Albanian. Koto Hoxhi was married to the daughter of Christakis Zografos, a local wealthy benefactor from Qestorat.

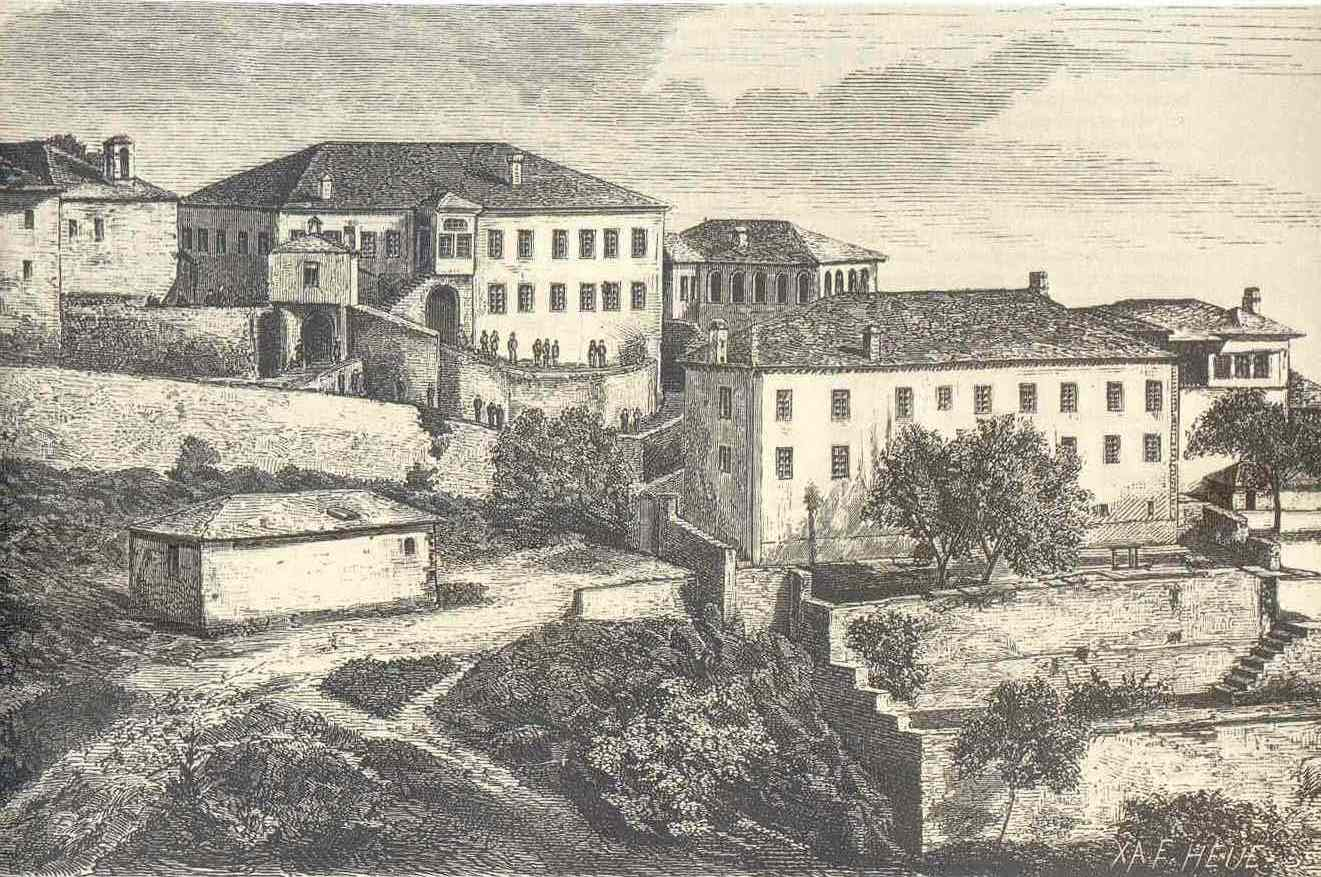
The college facilities at Qestorat.

Hoxhi was a teacher in the Greek seminary school in Qestorat which conducted all its lessons in Greek. In 1874, Hoxhi was responsible for writing one of the first plays performed in Albanian. The play was called A Wedding in Lunxhëria and it was performed in Gjirokastër.

He secretly started to teach his students at Qestorat written Albanian and later requested from the Ottoman governor of Ioannina permission to set up an Albanian school. For these activities Koto Hoxhi came into trouble with the Greek consulate of Ioannina and was excommunicated by the bishop of Gjirokastër of the Ecumenical Patriarchate of Constantinople. He was arrested and first imprisoned for this in the jail of Gjirokastër. Eventually he was transferred to the Yedikule prison in Istanbul where he died in 1895.

Whilst Hoxhi was a prisoner in Istanbul he was visited by Sevasti Qiriazi, one of the teachers of the First Albanian Language School of modern times, who persuaded a prison employee to smuggle her in disguised as a boy. The report came back that the former teacher was now a "bag of rags" on a stone slab that served as a bed. The "filthy hole" of a cell was deep within the prison and Hoxhi had lost most of his intellect, however he was grateful for the visit. He was clothed in rags and his hair and beard were long. He said that his body was broken but his soul was free, he hoped that Albania would be united and happy. Hoxhi said that the Sultan had told him that he could be released if he would give the names of the other people who were involved, but he had refused to cooperate. Hoxhi had been on the Central Committee for Defending Albanian Rights which supported the ideas of the League of Prizren. Other members included Pandeli Sotiri, Hasan Tahsini, Pashko Vasa, Jani Vreto, Sami Frashëri and Abdyl Frasheri.

== Legacy ==
Two of his students, Pandeli Sotiri and Petro Nini Luarasi, would notably continue his work.

Urani Rumbo founded a primary school for girls in his name in Gjirokastër in 1920.

== Works ==
- A Wedding in Lunxhëri, play, 1874
