= Protocol of Corfu =

1914 agreement recognizing Northern Epirus

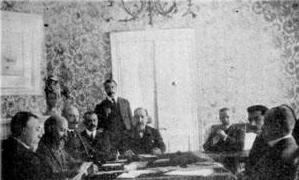
- Signed: 17 May 1914
- Location: Corfu, Greece
- Signatories: Principality of Albania; Autonomous Republic of Northern Epirus

The Protocol of Corfu (Greek: Πρωτόκολλο της Κέρκυρας, Albanian: Protokolli i Korfuzit), signed on 17 May 1914, was an agreement between the representatives of the Albanian Government and the Provisional Government of Northern Epirus, which officially recognized the area of Northern Epirus as an autonomous self-governing region under the sovereignty of the prince of the newly established Principality of Albania. The agreement granted the Greeks of the districts of Korytsa (Korçë) and Argyrokastro (Gjirokastër), which form Northern Epirus, wider religious, educational, cultural and political autonomy, inside the borders of the Albanian state.

After the end of the Balkan Wars (1912–1913), the subsequent peace treaties ceded the region to Albania. This turn of events catalyzed an uprising among the local Greeks, which led to the Northern Epirote Declaration of Independence, on 28 February 1914. The International Commission of Control, an organization responsible for securing peace and stability in the region, eventually intervened and the Protocol of Corfu was signed on 17 May 1914. However the protocol's terms were never fully implemented because of the politically unstable situation in Albania following the outbreak of World War I, and it was eventually annulled in 1921 during the Conference of Ambassadors.

== Background ==
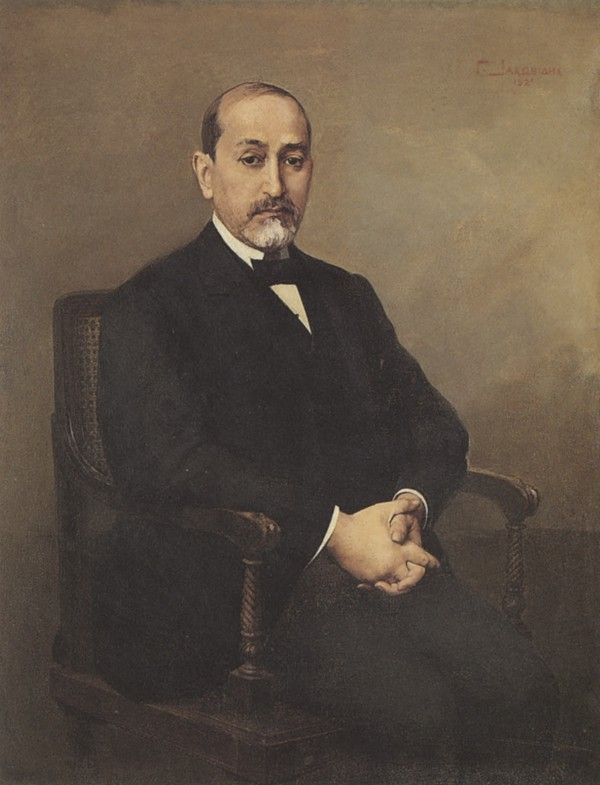
Georgios Christakis-Zografos, president of the Autonomous Republic of Northern Epirus.

During the First Balkan War, the Greek Army defeated the Ottoman forces and pushed north through the region of Epirus, reaching a line from Himara on the Ionian coast east to Prespa Lake by February 1913. Pending the final adjudication of the Great Powers regarding the border between Greece and the newly established state of Albania, the region remained under Greek military control. On 17 December 1913, the Protocol of Florence ceded the northern part of this area, which became known as "Northern Epirus", to Albania. This turn of events was highly unpopular among local Greeks, who decided to declare their independence and secure the region against any opposing threat. The Autonomous Republic of Northern Epirus was thus proclaimed in Argyrokastro (Gjirokastër) on 28 February 1914, with Georgios Christakis-Zografos, a distinguished Epirote politician from Lunxhëri, as its head.

Meanwhile, the Greek army evacuated from the region, and, on 1 March, Korytsa (Korçë) was ceded to the newly formed Albanian gendarmerie. Serious disturbances broke out in a number of places between the Autonomist forces and Albanian gendarmerie units and irregulars. Meanwhile, an International Commission formed by the Great Powers to secure stability and peace in the region was unable to achieve an agreement between the two sides.

== Negotiations ==
By early May, the Albanian authorities, being unable to suppress the revolt, became willing to start discussions with the intervention of the International Commission. Thus, Prince William of Wied of Albania asked the commission, which represented the Albanian government, to initiate negotiations. Subsequently, on 6 May, the members of the Commission informed Zografos that they were willing to discuss the demands of the Northern Epirote side.

Since incorporation into Greece was not an option after the recent political developments, Zografos proposed three main solutions to the representatives of the International Commission: complete autonomy under the sovereignty of the Albanian prince, administrative and canton type autonomy, and direct administration and control by the European Powers. The Northern Epirote side also demanded the extension of the area in which the Greek population would enjoy education in its native language to include the regions around Vlorë and Durrës (in central Albania, to the north of Northern Epirus), the appointment of Greek Orthodox higher officials in the main towns of Northern Epirus and the exemption from military service of the local population, even in time of war.

The representatives of both sides met for negotiations in Saranda, a coastal town in Northern Epirus, but the final negotiations took place in the nearby island of Corfu, Greece. Finally, on 17 May 1914, the representatives of Northern Epirus and Albania signed an agreement that granted the chief demands of the Epirotes and became known as the Protocol of Corfu. The Protocol is prefaced by a signed agreement of the commission:

The International Commission of Control, in order to avoid the resumption of hostilities, believes it to be its duty to reconcile as much as possible the point of the Epirote populations with regard to the special disposition which they ask for, and that of the Albanian Government.
It is with this idea in mind that the Commission has agreed to submit to the Great Powers which it represents, as well as to the Albanian Government, the enclosed text, which is the result of discussions between the members of the Commission and the Epirote delegates.

— Corfu, 17 May 1914

=== Terms ===
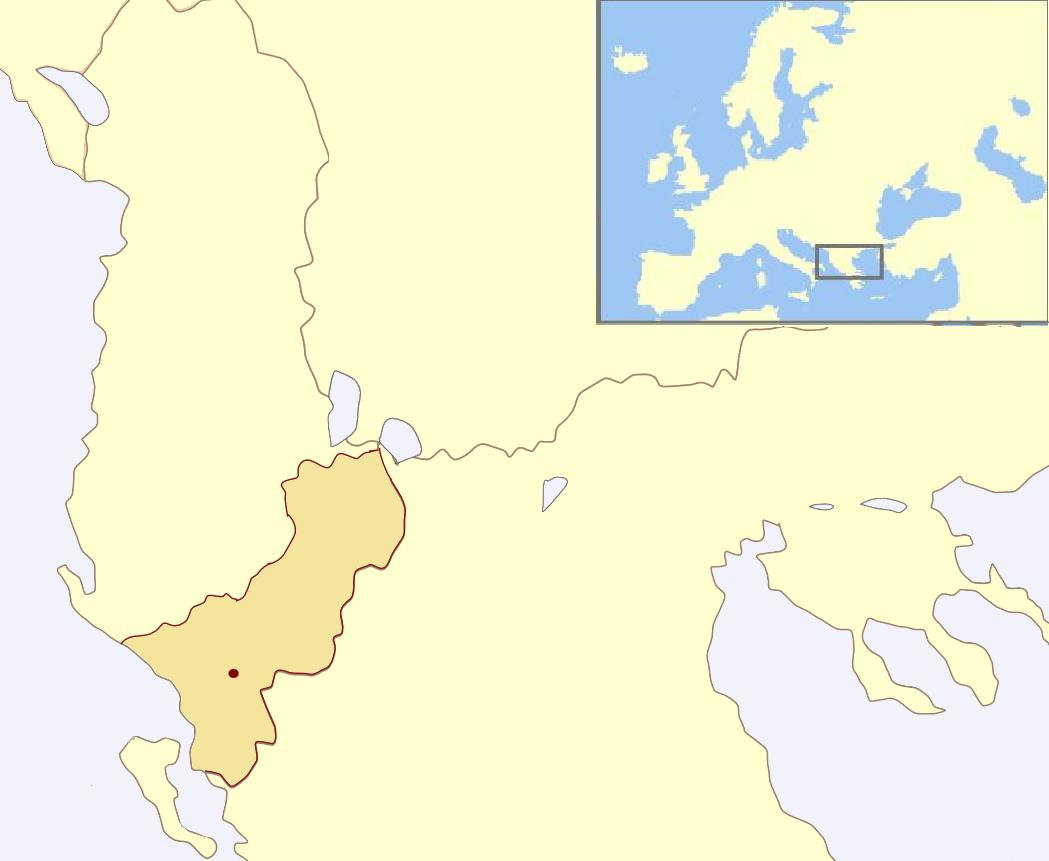
Territory of the Autonomous Republic of Northern Epirus

The Protocol fulfilled the main demands of the Northern Epirote side. According to its terms, the two provinces of Korytsa and Argyrokastron, which constituted Northern Epirus, would become autonomous under Albanian sovereignty and under the auspices of Prince William of Wied; he, however, was granted no effective power whatsoever.

The Albanian government, in agreement with the commission, had the right to appoint and dismiss governors and upper rank officials, taking into account the demographic composition of the local religious communities. Other terms included the proportional recruitment of natives into the local gendarmerie, and the prohibition of military levies from non-indigenous people of the region. In Orthodox schools, the Greek language would be the sole medium of instruction, except for grades one through three. However, religious education would be exclusively in Greek. Moreover, Greek was also made equal to Albanian in all public affairs, including courts and elective councils.

As for the coastal area of Himara, the special autonomous status that it enjoyed during the Ottoman era was renewed, with the addition that a foreigner was to be appointed as its "captain" for 10 years. Moreover, the Protocol stated that the city of Korçë – which was under control of the Albanian gendarmerie – was to come under the Northern Epirote administration. The Great Powers would guarantee the implementation of the terms of the Protocol, while its execution and maintenance was entrusted to the International Control Commission.

=== Reactions and approval ===
On 1 June the Great Powers (including Italy and Austria-Hungary) approved the results of the negotiations and on 23 June the terms of the Protocol were officially approved by the Albanian Government. The Greek government, without being involved until then in the situation, was aware of the negotiations and the possibility of a final agreement. Greek Prime Minister Eleftherios Venizelos advised Georgios Christakis-Zografos to approve the protocol's terms without asking for even wider autonomy.

The Northern Epirote representatives in the following Panepirotic Assembly of Delvino had to take the final decision on whether to accept the Protocol. The Protocol was eventually accepted after the intervention of Venizelos; however the representatives of Himara found the terms too humiliating, arguing that the only viable solution would be union with Greece and not autonomy inside the Albanian state.

== Aftermath ==
=== Political situation and outbreak of World War I ===
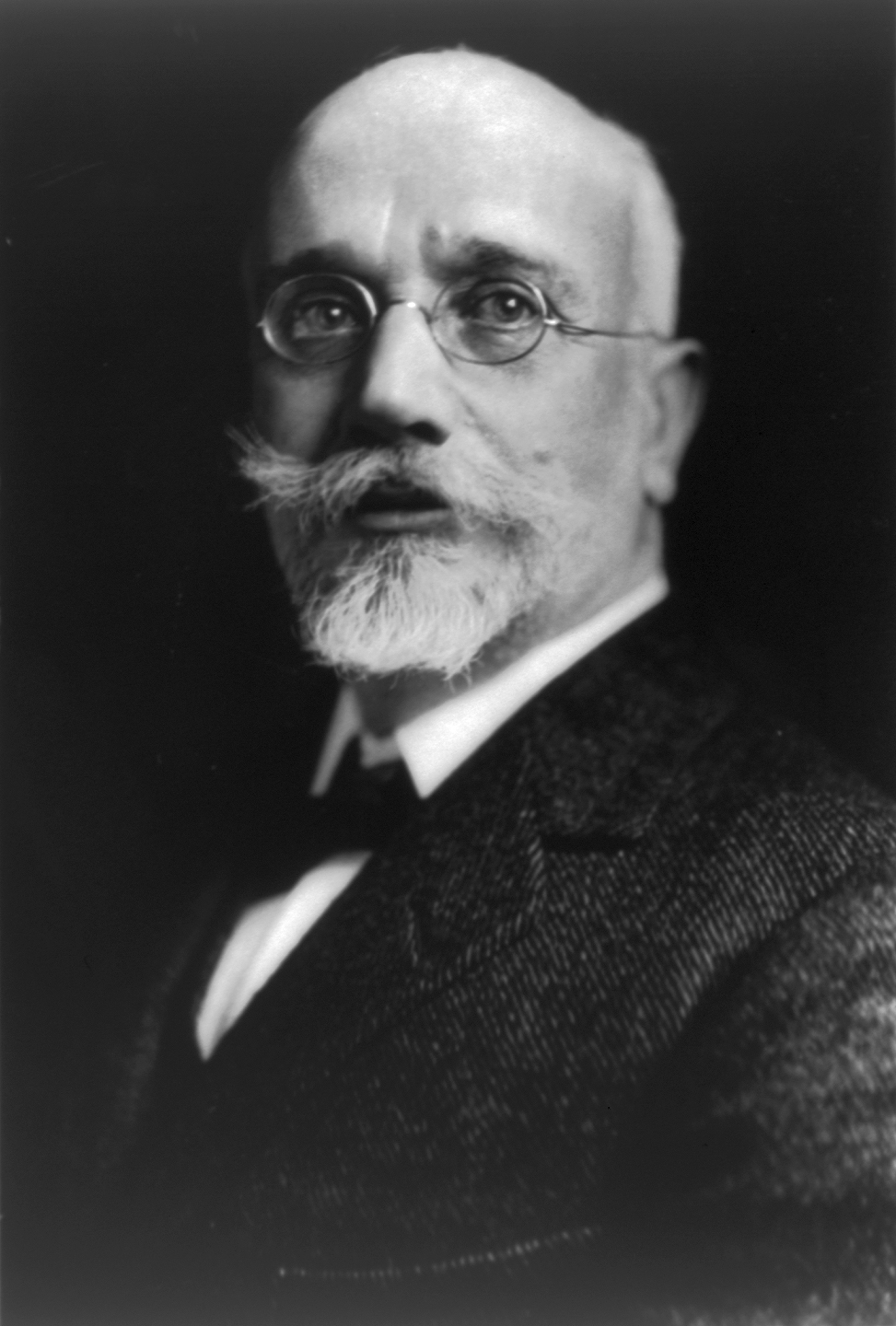
Greek Prime Minister, Eleftherios Venizelos, urged the delegates of the Assembly of Delvino to accept the terms of the Protocol.

Soon after the outbreak of World War I (July 1914), the situation in Albania became unstable and political chaos ensued. When the country became split into a number of regional governments, Prince William departed the country in September 1914. On 27 October, after approval from the Great Powers, the Greek army re-entered Northern Epirus. The Provisional Government of Northern Epirus formally ceased to exist, declaring that it had accomplished its objectives. The region was de facto annexed to Greece until the second half of 1916, when Italian troops evicted the Greek army from the area.

=== Interwar Period and Annulment of the Protocol ===
In 1921 the Protocol of Corfu was annulled during the Conference of Ambassadors and Northern Epirus was definitively ceded to the Albanian state. However attempts to re-establish an autonomous Northern Epirus continued. In 1921 the Albanian government, during the country's entrance to the League of Nations, committed itself to protect the rights of minorities within its territory, which were ratified by the local Parliament next year. However, these rights were granted within a much more limited area compared to the Protocol, which included only some villages in the regions of Himara, Gjirokastër and Saranda, and none of the main towns. Moreover, Greek education was viewed as a potential threat to the territorial integrity of the Albanian state and Greek schools were either closed or converted to Albanian ones. As a result of this policy, education in Greek was limited and for a time virtually eliminated (1934–1935). Only after the intervention of the Permanent Court of International Justice, in April 1935, did the Albanian side allow the reopening of Greek-language schools and waive its insistence on the use of Albanian in Greek schools.

The Albanian state also led efforts to establish an independent orthodox church, contrary to the provisions of the Protocol of Corfu and thereby reducing the influence of Greek language in the region. According to a 1923 law, priests who were not Albanian speakers, as well as not of Albanian origin, were excluded from this new autocephalous church.

== Legacy ==
The Protocol of Corfu is often mentioned by Northern Epirote and human rights organizations when referring to the discrimination against the Greek minority in Albania. On the other hand, in Albanian historiography this agreement is scarcely mentioned or its interpretation is often grounded on different positions: it is seen as an attempt to divide the Albanian state and as a proof of the Great Powers' disregard for the national integrity of Albania.

Notably, during the 1960s, the Soviet General Secretary Nikita Khrushchev asked the communist leader of Albania Enver Hoxha about giving autonomy to the minority, but this initiative was without any result. The autonomy question remains one of the main issues on the diplomatic agenda in Albanian-Greek relations, after the 1991 collapse of the communist regime in Albania. Moreover, a certain degree of autonomy, based on the terms of the Protocol of Corfu, is the main objective of the organization Omonoia, as well as the Unity for Human Rights Party, which represents the Greek minority in the Albanian government. Such proposals were rejected in 1991 by the Albanian government, thus spurring Omonoia's radical wing to call for union with Greece. In another incident, in 1993, Omonoia's chairman was immediately arrested by the Albanian police, after explaining in public that the goal of the Greek minority was autonomy inside the Albanian borders, based on the terms of the protocol.

== Sources ==
- Boeckh, Katrin (1996). Von den Balkankriegen zum Ersten Weltkrieg : Kleinstaatenpolitik und ethnische Selbstbestimmung auf dem Balkan (in German). München: Oldenbourg. ISBN 978-3-486-56173-9.
- Nataša Gregorič Contested Spaces and Negotiated Identities in Dhermi/Drimades of Himare/Himara area, Southern Albania. University of Nova Gorica 2008.
- Miller, William (1966). Ottoman empire and its successors, 1801–1927. Routledge. ISBN 978-0-7146-1974-3.
- Stickney, Edith Pierpont (1926). Southern Albania or northern Epirus in European international affairs, 1912–1923. Stanford University Press. ISBN 978-0-8047-6171-0.
- Valeria Heuberger; Arnold Suppan; Elisabeth Vyslonzil (1996). Brennpunkt Osteuropa: Minderheiten im Kreuzfeuer des Nationalismus (in German). Oldenbourg Wissenschaftsverlag. ISBN 978-3-486-56182-1.
- Sakellariou., M. V. (1997). Epirus, 4000 years of Greek history and civilization. Ekdotikē Athēnōn. ISBN 9789602133712.
- Vickers Miranda, Pettifer James. Albania: From Anarchy to a Balkan Identity. C. Hurst & Co. Publishers, 1997, ISBN 1-85065-290-2
