= December 1915 Greek parliamentary election =

- 19 December [O.S. 6 December] 1915

All 335 seats in the Hellenic Parliament 168 seats needed for a majority
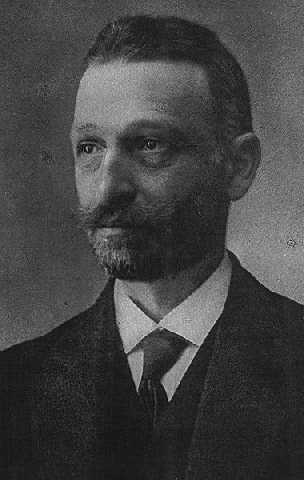

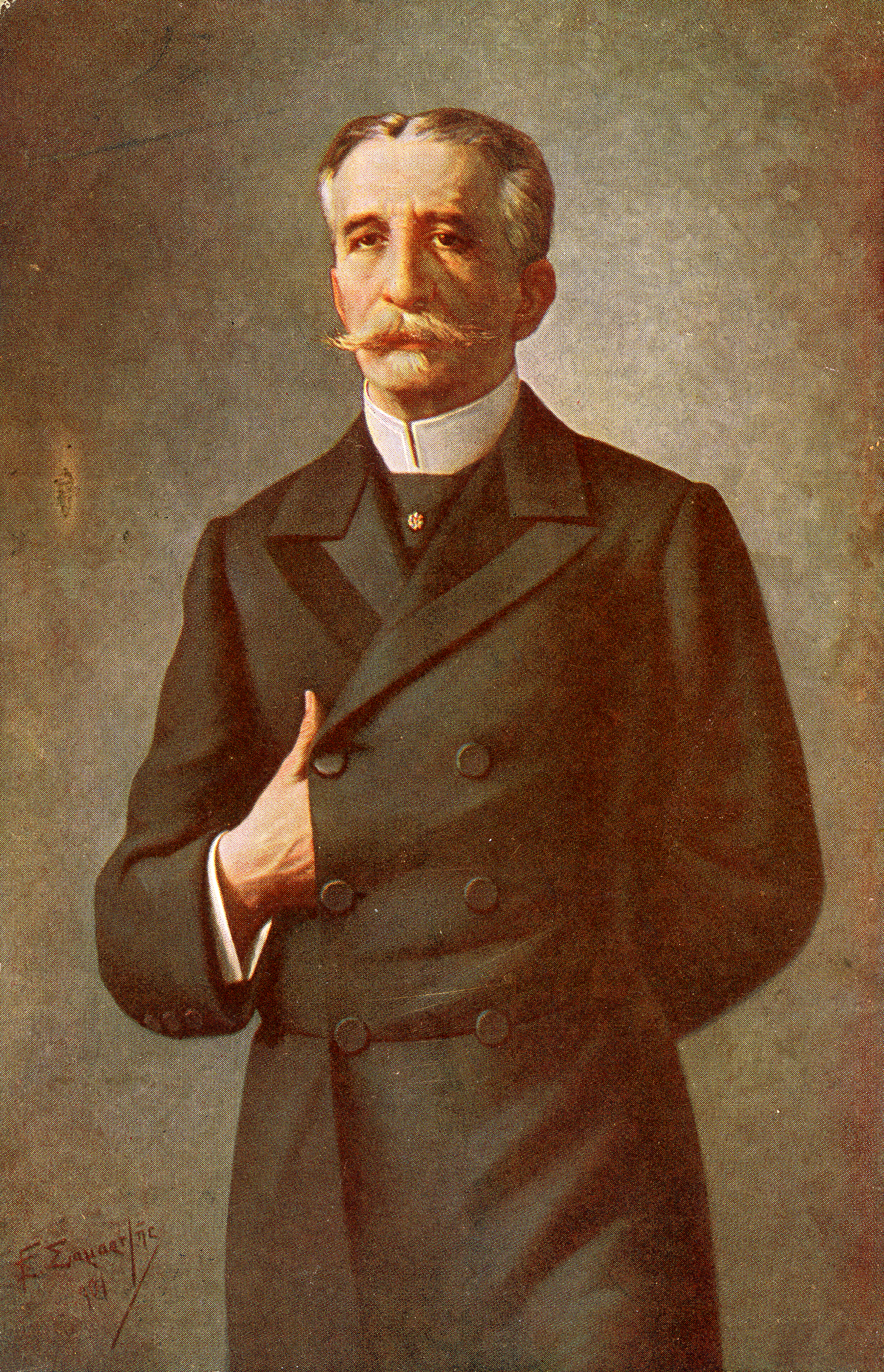

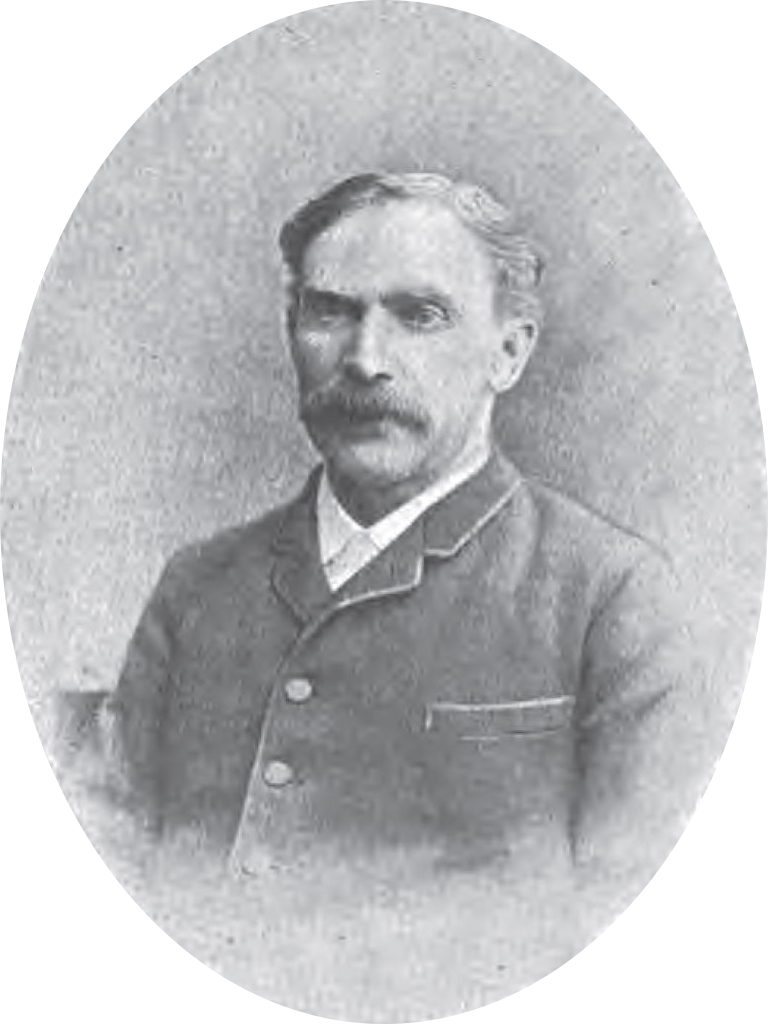
	First party	Second party	Third party
Leader	Dimitrios Gounaris	Georgios Theotokis	Dimitrios Rallis
Party	Nationalists	Theotokis supporters	Rallis supporters
Seats won	256	21	18
Prime Minister before election
Stefanos Skouloudis
Independent
Prime Minister after election
Stefanos Skouloudis
Independent

Parliamentary elections were held in Greece on 19 December [O.S. 6 December] 1915. They were boycotted by Eleftherios Venizelos and his party, the Liberal Party, as unconstitutional, a result of a confrontation with King Constantine I over the country's participation in World War I. Venizelos considered Greece as a close and loyal ally of the United Kingdom and France, while Constantine I, who was affiliated with the House of Hohenzollern (the German royal family), favored neutrality.

Although the electoral body supported Venizelos, Constantine insisted on his position and did not hesitate to confront the democratically elected government. Venizelos resigned and withdrew temporarily from the political fore, leading the crisis to its worst point.

Only right-wing parties participated in the elections. In a few months the crisis would almost become a civil war (the "National Schism") between the supporters of Venizelos, who created their own government in Thessaloniki, while the official government of Athens remained under the control of Constantine.

== Results ==
Party	Votes	%	Seats
Nationalists			256
Supporters of Georgios Theotokis			21
Supporters of Dimitrios Rallis			18
Supporters of Dimitrakopoulos			5
Supporters of Ion Dragoumis			5
Northern Epirus Independents			19
Independents			11
Total			335
Total votes	334,945	–	
Source: Nohlen & Stöver
