= Georgios Christakis-Zografos =

Greek politician and only president of Northern Epirus

Georgios Christakis-Zografos Γεώργιος Χρηστάκης-Ζωγράφος
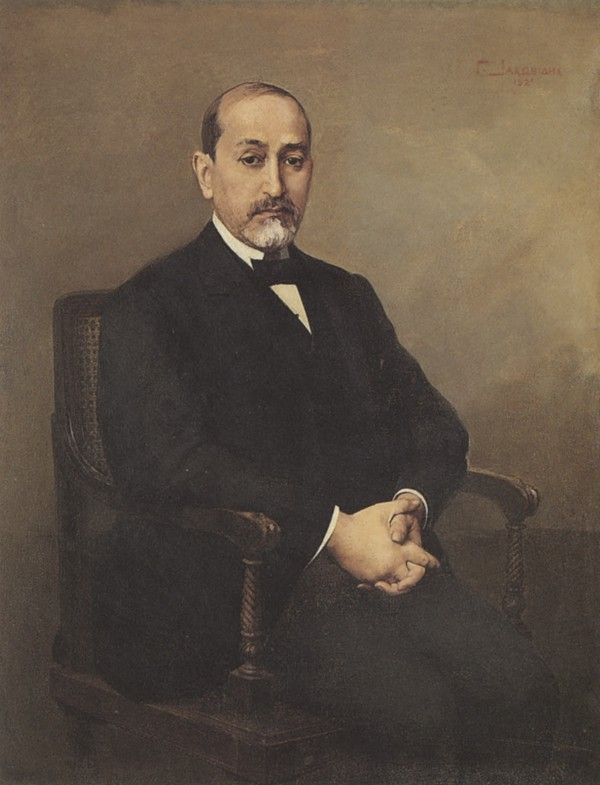
- Georgios Christakis-Zografos, 1914

President of the Autonomous Republic of Northern Epirus
- In office 28 February 1914 – 28 October 1914
- Preceded by: Position established
- Succeeded by: Position abolished

Minister for Foreign Affairs (Greece)
- In office 7 July 1909 – 15 August 1909
- Preceded by: Georgios Baltatzis
- Succeeded by: Kyriakoulis Mavromichalis
- In office 25 February 1915 – 10 August 1915
- Preceded by: Eleftherios Venizelos
- Succeeded by: Dimitrios Gounaris

Personal details
- Born: 8 March 1863 Paris, France
- Died: 24 June 1920 (aged 57) Athens, Greece
- Education: University of Paris; Ludwig-Maximilians-Universität München
- Profession: Jurist; Member of Parliament; Diplomat

Georgios Christakis-Zografos (Greek: Γεώργιος Χρηστάκης-Ζωγράφος; 1863–1920) was a Greek politician, minister of foreign affairs and president of the Autonomous Republic of Northern Epirus (1914).

== Life ==
=== Studies and early career ===
He was the son of the entrepreneur and benefactor Christakis Zografos, from Qestorat, (Lunxhëri) in the Gjirokastër prefecture. Christakis-Zografos studied law and political science at the University of Paris and the Ludwig-Maximilians-Universität München. When he returned to Greece, he was involved in agricultural reforms especially according to the large fields his father possessed in Thessaly. During this period he supported the concept that the large feudal estates (called cifliks during the period) of the region should be expropriated and redistributed to those who owned no land. He sold to non-land owners much of his agricultural fields in extremely low prices.

=== 1905–1913 ===
In 1905, he was elected to the Greek Parliament for the Karditsa prefecture. In 1909, he served as Foreign Minister under Dimitrios Rallis. After the First Balkan War, he was appointed Governor General of newly liberated from the Greek Army Epirus region. Christakis-Zografos served as Governor General of Epirus from March 29 (March 16 OS), 1913 until December 31 (December 18 OS) of the same year.

=== Head of the Provisional Government of Northern Epirus ===
When the Great Powers decided to award Northern Epirus to Albania, local Greeks formed a provisional government under Christakis-Zografos on February 28, 1914, and declared their autonomy the following day in Gjirokastër. Zografos sent a note to each of the representatives of the Great Powers explaining the eminent situation:

Under these conditions and in the absence of a solution that would suffice to safeguard Epirus, a solution would have been otherwise so easy to discover, the Epirote populace is forced to declare to the Powers that it cannot submit to their decision. It will declare its independence and will struggle for its existence, its traditions and its rights.
But, before it executes this last decision, Epirus turns for the last time to face its judges and pleads with them to modify their decision by which a whole people is condemned.
This people hopes that the Powers will be pleased to make known to it, the sole interested party, their final decision
May Christian and civilized Europe, by this decision, escape the heavy responsibility for the horror of a ruthless struggle.

After a three months period of armed conflicts, the European Powers intervened and asked for negotiations on a new basis. On May 17 the state of Northern Epirus was internationally recognized by the Protocol of Corfu, as an autonomous region inside the borders of Albania. However, this state was short lived and on October 27, when World War I broke out and the Albanian government collapsed, the Greek army re-entered the area with the sanction of the Great Powers.

=== 1914–1920 ===
Christakis-Zografos after the second Greek administration in the area, returned to Greece and was elected at the following elections. He resigned his office at December 1914. A little while later he became executive of the National Bank of Greece, position he retained until September 1917, with a short-term interval (February 25-August 10, 1915) when he became for second time Minister of Foreign Affairs under the cabinet of Dimitrios Gounaris. He supported the entrance Greece on the side of the Triple Entente during World War I, foreseeing that this strategic move could offer to the country several advantages. He retired in 1917 and died three years later from a longtime heart ailment.

== Legacy ==
During the Communist regime in Albania (1945–1992), Georgios Christakis-Zografos and his father Christakis Zografos (notable benefactor and entrepreneur), were stigmatised as 'enemies of the state'. Anyone from his home town who held the name 'Zografos' (whether relatives or not), was therefore persecuted. After 1992 however, the situation has changed. Today, the Zografeio school in Qestorati, founded by his father, has been renovated and has reopened as a museum.

== Sources ==
- Abbott, G. F. (2008). Greece and the Allies 1914-1922. BiblioBazaar. ISBN 978-0-554-39462-6.
- Stickney, Edith Pierpont (1926). Southern Albania or northern Epirus in European international affairs, 1912-1923. Stanford University Press. ISBN 9780804761710.
- Ruches, Pyrrhus J. (1965). Albania's captives. Argonaut.

Political offices
| Preceded by Georgios Baltatzis | Minister for Foreign Affairs of Greece; 7 July – 15 August 1909 | Succeeded by Kyriakoulis Mavromichalis |
| Preceded by Eleftherios Venizelos | Minister for Foreign Affairs of Greece; 25 February – 10 August 1915 | Succeeded by Dimitrios Gounaris |
| Preceded by Greek administration | President of the Provisional Government of Northern Epirus; 28 February – 27 October 1914 | Succeeded by Greek administration |
