= Qestorat =

Qestorat Chiãsturat
- Village
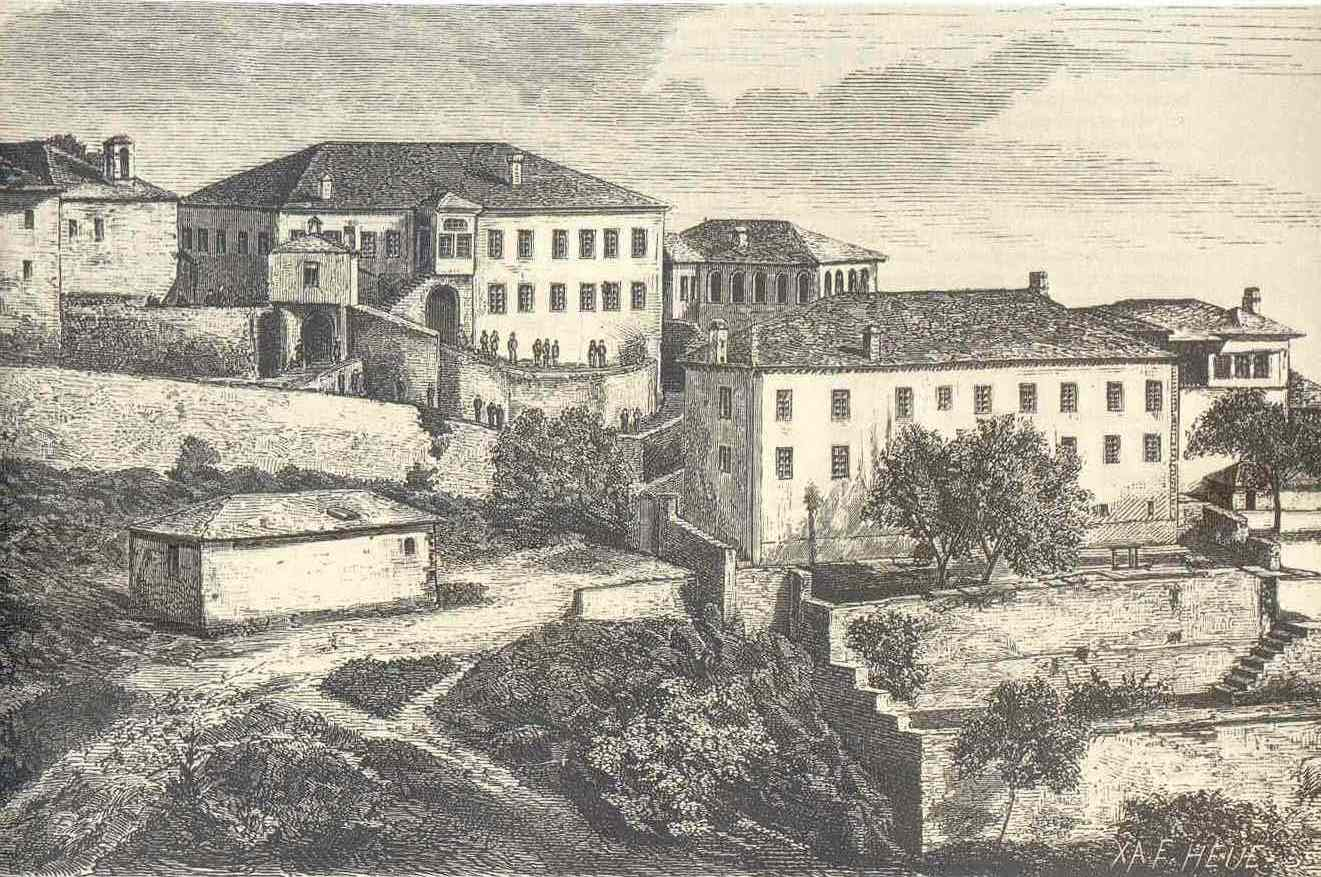
- Zographeion college facilities in Qestorat (1881)

- Location within Albania
- Country: Albania
- County: Gjirokastër
- Municipality: Gjirokastër
- Administrative unit: Lunxhëri
- Time zone: UTC+1 (CET)
  - Summer (DST): UTC+2 (CEST)

Qestorat (Aromanian: Chiãsturat or Chiãsturata) is a community of the former Lunxhëri municipality in the Gjirokastër County, southern Albania. At the 2015 local government reform it became part of the municipality Gjirokastër.

From 1874 to 1891 the village was home to the Greek Zographeion College, educational facilities that included primary and secondary male, female schools and a teacher's academy and operated with the personal costs of the local benefactor Christakis Zografos. Today this institution houses the museum of Lunxhëri.

== Name ==
Its name contains the Albanian suffix -at, widely used to form toponyms from personal names and surnames.

== Demographics ==
In the Ottoman register of 1520 for the Sanjak of Avlona, Qestorat (Isharat) was attested as a village in the timar under the authority of Ali from Damas. The village had a total of 71 households. The anthroponymy attested overwhelmingly belonged to the Albanian onomastic sphere, characterised by personal names such as Bardh, Deda, Gjin,Gjon, Kola, Leka and others.

Today the village of Qestorat is inhabited by an Aromanian majority, with a minority of Orthodox Albanians and Muslim Albanians. The Aromanian presence in Qestorat dates to the communist era.

== Notable people ==
- Koto Hoxhi, Albanian Rilindas and teacher of Pandeli Sotiri and Petro Nini Luarasi
- Christakis Zografos, Greek banker and benefactor
