= Lunxhëria =

Ethnographic region in Albania

Lunxhëri is a region in the Gjirokastër County, Albania. It is an ethnographic region along with neighboring regions such as Kurvelesh, Zagori and Dropull. It is in the periphery of a wider ethnographic region known as Labëria, though its population is said to be non-Lab. Many of its native inhabitants prefer for Lunxhëria to be identified instead as Tosk, as are neighboring regions to the east such as Dangëllia and Kolonja, rather than Lab; some researchers instead prefer to view Lunxhëria as a "transitory region" that is linguistically part of Labëria (using the Vjosa river as the boundary) but culturally part of Toskëria (using the Drino as the boundary). Lunxhëria is predominantly inhabited by Albanians, but also has Aromanian and Greek minorities.

== Geography ==
Apart from the Lunxhëri municipality, Lunxhëri traditionally incorporates a wider region that extends from Hormovë west, Gryka e Suhës south, the crest of Mount Lunxhëri east, and the valley of the Drino west. It includes the villages of Lunxhëri municipality, Odrie municipality, Antigonë municipality, Selckë from the Pogon municipality, Labovë e Kryqit which administratively belongs to Libohovë municipality, and villages of Lekël and Hormovë which administratively belong to Tepelenë District. The region has some rivers and streams: Përroi i Dhoksatit, Perroi i Mingulit, Përroi i Qestoratit, and the river of Nimica.

== History ==
=== Ancient and medieval period ===
A number of archeological sites in the region are located next to the modern villages of Këllez, Dhoksat, Erind as well the ancient Greek city of Antigonia, today a National Park. Ancient ruins near Erind appear to be related to the ancient settlements of "Hekatopedion", "Ongolion" and "Eliaion".

In 1321 a decree issued by the Byzantine Emperor recognized the special status of the village of Soucha (today Suhë) is mentioned while its Aromanian (Vlach) population is exempted from military service.

=== Ottoman period ===
In 1571 a short lived rebellion broke out under Emmanuel Mormoris and the local population was in favour of the movement, nevertheless Ottoman control was restored that same year.

At 1630-1653 the Aromanian inhabitants of Saraqinisht were able to contribute to the foundation of several Orthodox monuments such as the churches of Saint Nicholas, Prophet Elija and the nearby monastery of Theotokos of Spilaio.

During the era of conversions to Islam in the 18th century, Christian Albanian-speaking areas such as the region of Lunxhëri strongly resisted those efforts.

In the early 19th century Austrian, British and French travelers coming from Ioannina to Lunxhëria felt that they were entering in another country that differed from adjacent Greek regions in local customs and way of life while noting that the region was inhabited by Albanian-speaking Orthodox Christians.

=== Modern period ===
The area has been characterized by frequent immigration during the 19th and 20th centuries. Members of the local diaspora became notable politicians, merchants, doctors, benefactors, scholars, giving immense contributions to the history of Albania and Greece. Although most of the locals that migrated to other regions declared themselves as Greeks, at the same time, the majority of the population in the end of the 19th century spoke Albanian. In the same context, people like Koto Hoxhi and Pandeli Sotiri were pro-Albanian and part of the elite of Rilindas, while Christakis Zografos, Evangelos Zappas and especially Georgios Zografos (head of the Autonomous Republic of Northern Epirus), supported the Greek national ideas. However, the majority of the locals were between this two extreme points.

After Lunxhëria's incorporation into the Albanian state and the departure or marginalization of many of the strongest pro-Greek ("filogrek") families, a strong Albanian national feeling paired with a strong regional identity took hold. The French anthropologist Gilles De Rapper found that Lunxhots express their pride to be Albanian by asserting that they are the truest Albanians of the area, as opposed to on one hand to members of the Greek and Aromanian ethnic minorities who are of non-Albanian ethnicity and suspicious loyalties, and on the other to the ethnically Albanian Muslim migrants from Kurvelesh, who are asserted to have abandoned their Orthodox faith and therefore become "Turks", as opposed to the Albanian Orthodox who are said to have better preserved their Albanian culture. Lunxhëria villages of the interwar period were small and compact such as Saraqinisht and Stegopull containing some 50 houses each while the people of the region were all Albanian Orthodox Christians except in Erind which was inhabited by both Muslims and Christians. British archaeologist Clarke visited in 1924 and noted that in Saraqinisht and Labove there was a certain amount of pro-Greek feeling. During the interwar period and World War I many families both of pro-Albanian and pro-Greek left the area, with the pro-Albanian families being forced to leave at certain times by powerful pro-Greek families. An Aromanian minority settled in the region as part of the resettlement policies of the communist regime (1945–1991). During World War II and the developments of the Greco-Italian War (1940–1941) the region came under the control of the advancing Greek army, who were welcomed in the houses of the local population.

State policies during the People's Republic of Albania also created a buffer zone between Lunxhëria and the nearby recognized Greek minority zone of Dropull with the settlement of Albanian Muslim communities in fear of Hellenization of Lunxhëria.

== Demographics ==
Many families have emigrated after 1990, leading to a decrease in population. The people of Lunxhëria mainly intermarried among themselves, however during the communist era instances of marriage alliances, encouraged by the then regime, occurred with nearby Greek villagers around Gjirokastër to access better life opportunities. Orthodox Albanians in the area do not marry Aromanians.

- the Lunxhots, who call themselves "ethnic Lunxhots" or "autoktonë" and are called "villagers" (fshatarë) by others
- the Aromanian settlers, who call themselves çoban or Greek-Vlachs, and are considered as newcomers (të ardhur) by the Lunxhots, after World War II. Despite being officially the same religion as the Orthodox Albanian autochthones of Lunxhëria, the native Albanians of Lunxhëria sometimes refer to them as being of a different fe (religion) and are reluctant to marry, or to let their children marry, Aromanians. Almost all of them come ultimately in Ottoman times from the village of Kefalovryso (known as Mexhidë in Albanian), now located in Northwest Greece. In modern times, Aromanians were the first group in Lunxhëria to emigrate to Greece.
- the Muslim-background Albanian settlers from Labëria region (beside Erind who are locals), settling in throughout all 20th century, called Labs by the locals.

== Religion ==
The population is of Orthodox religion majority, with Lab families being a Muslim minority. The so-called "autoktonë" families are completely Orthodox, beside Erind which is mostly Muslim.

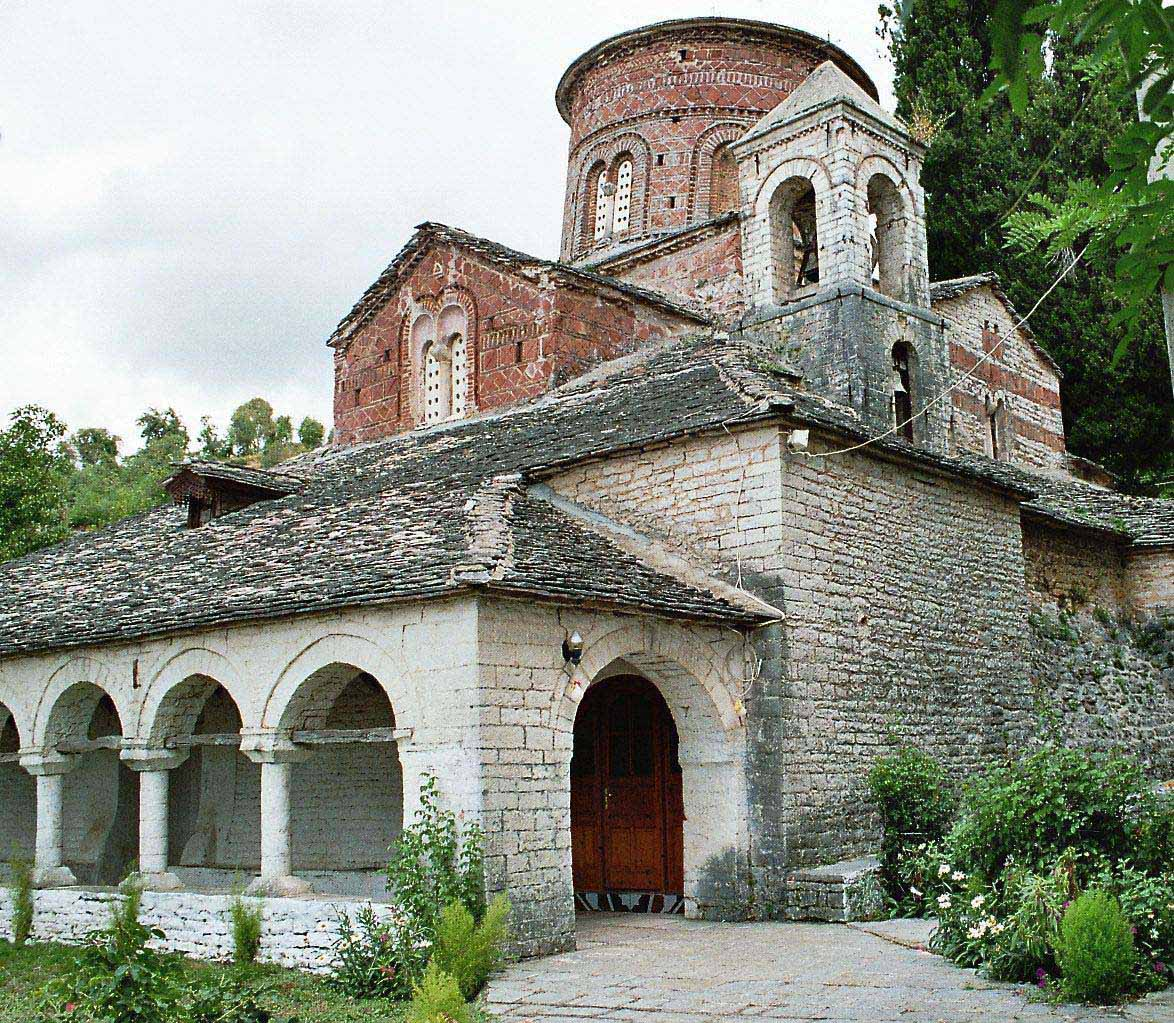
Orthodox church in Labova e Kryqit

== Notable people ==
- Koto Hoxhi, a representative of the Albanian national awakening (Rilindas).
- Kostandin Manxhari, a representative of the Albanian national awakening.
- Nase Jani, Albanian poet, born in Stegopul.
- Kyriakos Kyritsis lawyer and member of the Greek Parliament (1915–1917) for the Argyrokastron Prefecture.
- Thanas Nano, from Nokovë, the father of Fatos Nano and writer.
- Fatos Nano, Albanian politician and former Prime Minister of Albania
- Mihal Prifti, first Albanian ambassador to the Soviet Union.
- Ioannis Poutetsis (1878–1912), revolutionary, leader of Greek guerrilla group.
- Petro Poga, former Albanian Rilindas and acting Prime Minister of Albania.
- Janko Poga, chief of artillery of Ali Pasha Tepelena.
- Urani Rumbo (1895–1936), Albanian feminist, teacher and playwright.
- Pandeli Sotiri, Albanian Rilindas and director of the first Albanian school of modern times.
- Koto Sotiri, member of the Society for the Publication of Albanian Writings, Istanbul, 1879.
- Thanasis Vagias, confidant of Ali Pasha Tepelena
- Christakis Zografos (1820–1898), benefactor and entrepreneur. Founder of a number of Greek schools (called Zografeia schools) in Qestorati, Gjirokastër and Constantinople.
- Georgios Christakis-Zografos (1863–1920), son of the above mentioned. Head of the Autonomous Republic of Northern Epirus.
- Konstantinos Lagoumitzis a revolutionary during the Greek War of Independence.
- Kristo Meksi, an Albanian politician, signatory of Albanian Declaration of Independence, and diplomat.
- Vangjel Meksi, first translator of the New Testament in Albanian.
- Evangelis Zappas, benefactor.
- Konstantinos Zappas, benefactor.
- Petros Zappas, entrepreneur and politician.
- Aleksandër Meksi, Albanian politician and former Prime Minister.
- Mihal Duri, Albanian communist
- Misto Mame, Albanian communist activist
- Anastas Byku, publicist of 19th century, publisher of Pelasgos newspaper in 1861.
- Kostandin Boshnjaku, former Governor of Bank of Albania, politician, member of Albanian parliament, friend of Albert Einstein
- Gjergj Suli, from Lekël, Orthodox cleric and martyr, collaborator of Fan Noli and activist of Vatra, executed by the communist regime in 1948
- Loukas Vagias, physician to Ali Pasha, afterwards to Prince Mavrocordato; educated in Vienna, he was among those treating Lord Byron at Missolonghi.

== See also ==
- Tourism in Albania
- Zographeion College
