= Vaia =

Vaia may refer to:

== People ==
- Vaia Dirva (born 1977), Greek retired volleyball player
- Vaia Papadimitriou, Greek physicist
- Vaia Zaganas (born 1975), Canadian boxer

== Other uses ==
- Vaia (river), in Romania
- Storm Adrian, also known as Storm Vaia, a 2018 Mediterranean storm
- Video Artists International Audio (VAIA), a record label

== See also ==
- Vaya (disambiguation)
