= Bible translations into Albanian =

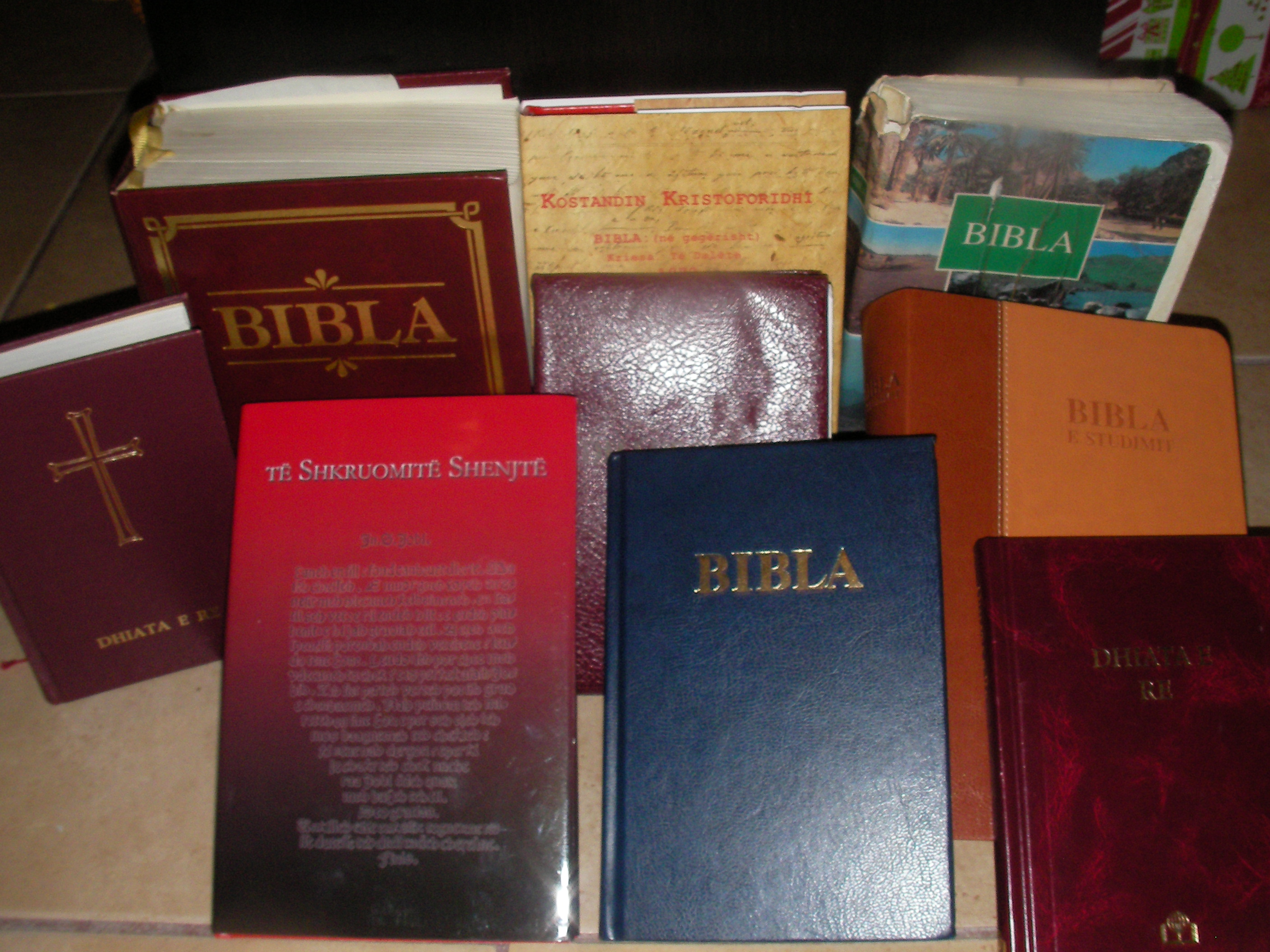
Albanian Bible Translations

The history of Bible translations into Albanian can be divided into early and modern translations.

== Early Translations (Albanian Renaissance Translations) ==
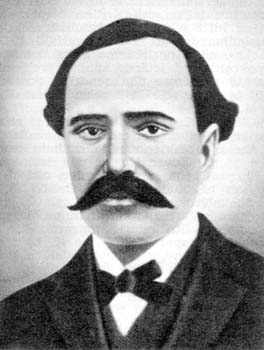
Kostandin Kristoforidhi

=== The Buzuku Translations, 1554–1555 ===
Though not an actual Bible translation, Albanian priest Gjon Buzuku translated selected Scripture portions into Albanian which were printed in the first known Albanian book, The Missal (Meshari), composed in the Gheg dialect of Albanian. The Apostolic Library in the Vatican holds the only known copy of the book. Dr. Thoma Qendro prepared the Biblical text from Buzuku's Missal for the Albanian Interconfessional Bible Society's reprint in 2010.

=== Elbasan Gospel Manuscript, 1761 ===
Earlier attempts have been recorded such as the 18th century Elbasan Gospel Manuscript.

== Bible Society Translations into Gheg and Tosk ==
=== Meksi Tosk Translation, 1821–1827 (New Testament) ===
Vangjel Meksi translated the New Testament in 1821 on the initiative of and with the support of British and Foreign Bible Society. The Bible Society then engaged bishop Gregory IV of Athens to revise/edit the translation. The book of Matthew was published in 1824 and the full New Testament in the Tosk form of Albanian in 1827, in both a full volume and a split two-volume set because "the Albanians had the custom of carrying their books with them near their heart." An Albanian Translation of the Transcript was done by Dr. Thoma Qendro. The book was printed and published in the spring of 2016 by SHBSHA.

=== Kristoforidhi Translations, 1868–1884 ===
Kostandin Kristoforidhi translated the New Testament into Albania's two dialects, of Gheg and Tosk.

The New Testament in Gheg was published in 1872, and the New Testament in Tosk in 1879, and he also translated portions of the Old Testament into Tosk (Genesis, Exodus, Deuteronomy, The Psalms, The Proverbs, and Isaiah). His work was also supported by the British and Foreign Bible Society. These works are being reprinted by the Albanian Interconfessional Bible Society in a ten volume set which includes Kristoforidhi's Albanian Grammar (1882) and manuscript facsimiles.

Kristoforidhi's New Testament was revised in 2005. The revision has been prepared by Mr. Thoma Qendro with the blessing of the Archbishop of the Albanian Orthodox Church his grace Anastas and was published by the Interconfessional Bible Society of Albania.

== Modern Translations into Standard Albanian ==
=== Filipaj Version, 1977 (NT), 1994 (whole Bible) ===
Dom Simon Filipaj who was from Montenegro, worked with the Belgrade office of the United Bible Societies (UBS) in Yugoslavia, to produce a Bible translation in Standard Albanian. The New Testament was published in 1977, which makes it the first New Testament in modern Albanian, rather than a dialect like Tosk or Gheg. One of the translation Consultants was Dayrell Oakley-Hill who had served in Albania with the Gendarmerie in the 1930s. In 1994, Drita re-produced Dom Simon Filipaj's Bible which includes the Apocrypha. The version is used by Albanian Roman Catholic churches.

=== ECM Version, 1993 (whole Bible) ===
In 1993, European Christian Mission produced the first bound copy of the entire Bible in Standard Albanian, prepared by Stephen Etches. Bible smuggler Brother Andrew came personally to Albania to present this Bible to the country's president and people. This version which was a dynamic equivalent translation similar to the English Good News Bible or German Gute Nachricht translation is now out of print. In 2003 this was reprinted by the Albanian Interconfessional Bible Society.

=== ABS Version, 1994 (whole Bible) ===
In 1993, the Albanian Bible Society finished work on a translation of the complete Old Testament and by 1994 they finished the entire Bible. The Society had been preparing literature with Biblical content since 1974 and originally published its Bible with the name "Lajmi i Mirë" (LIM). The work was translated from the Italian text of the Textus Receptus-based Nuova Diodati Revision 1991 and checked against the original languages and the English King James Version. By 2002 the Society produced a revision of the New Testament which was "completely revised and compared in detail with the original text." This version continues to circulate widely among evangelical churches and is presented in various formats including the "Bibla e Studimit" (The New Thompson Study Bible, Albanian version 2009). In websites and apps this version is accessed as "ALBB Albanian Bible." This text is copyright the Albanian Bible Society (ABS) although it is misleadingly labelled as public domain on various websites.

=== Lea Plumbi-Frenzcke Version 1996 (New Testament) ===
This translation was published by Botime Çabej MÇM. According to the version's foreword, the textual basis is the Textus Receptus but also makes use of Nestle-Aland's Novum Testamentum Graece for several passages. Lea Plumbi-Frenzcke translated it with the help of Biblical Greek scholars. The literary editing was done by Gjergj Zheji. The language is slightly Tosk and the proper names reflect that (Joani instead of Gjoni, etc.). The stated purpose of this translation was to make a faithful, word-for-word translation that is understandable for the Albanian people.

=== CHC Version, 2000 (New Testament) ===
In 2000, Albanian linguist Vladimir Dervishi (1958–2010) produced a New Testament translation called the CHC (Christian Heritage College) Version and is based on Nestle-Aland's Novum Testamentum Graece with comparisons from the Textus Receptus.

=== New World Translation, 2000 ===
In 2000, the Jehovah's Witnesses' New World Translation of the Christian Greek Scriptures was released in Albanian (Shkrimet e Shenjta Përkthimi Bota e Re); the entire New World Translation of the Holy Scriptures in Albanian was released in 2005. According to the JW website their Bible translations are translated from English.

=== SHIB Version, 2007 (New Testament) ===
In 2007, Shërbimi Informues Biblik (SHIB) produced a text of the New Testament reportedly based on the 1912 German Luther Bibel. It was translated into Albanian by Marcel Steiner and edited by Kujtim Drizari, and called Besëlidhja e Re, Zëri i Zotit.

=== Së bashku, 2022 (whole Bible) ===
In 2007, the Albanian Interconfessional Bible Society (or "Shoqëria Biblike," a division of the United Bible Societies) produced a new translation of the New Testament based on The Greek New Testament, Fourth Revised Edition by the UBS. It was printed with a short concordance and names index. The Old Testament was then translated from the original Hebrew. As reflected in its title, Së bashku, which means altogether in Albanian, this is "the fruit of the co-operative work of all the Christian confessions present in Albania" i.e. Protestant, Catholic and Orthodox. In websites and apps this version is accessed as "AL Së bashku". The full Bible was completed in 2020, and published in 2022. This translation is true and faithful to the original languages, is clear and natural sounding and in modern standard Albanian, and is not theologically biased to any denominational interpretations. It is accepted across all the denominations. It is available in print and online in the YouVersion app and other platforms. It was published by the Interconfessional Bible Society of Albania also engages in reproducing the earliest known Albanian versions or portions of the Bible.

=== Bibla PRO Version ===
The BiblaPRO version ("Përkthimi i Ri i Biblës nga Origjinali", or "New Translation of the Bible from the Original") is currently in translation. The New Testament is complete and as of 2025 was in circulation, whereas the Old Testament is still in translation. The text seeks to fulfill three aims: 1) to be true and faithful to the original languages in both semantic and stylistic aspects; 2) to be as clear and flowing as possible within the boundaries of today's standard Albanian; and 3) to be faithful in the presentation of theological content and historical/cultural information. The text is offered in both an interlinear format (the first of its kind in Albanian), and a standard reading version, in both print and electronic formats.

=== Bibla "Kristoforidhi i Dytë" Version (whole Bible) ===
The "Second Kristoforidhi" translation is named after the eminent Albanian Bible translator and linguist Kostandin Kristoforidhi and follows the Textus Receptus manuscript tradition. Its publishers describe it as continuing the textual line of Kristoforidhi's New Testament and the ABS Version (1994). It employs a formal equivalence methodology from the King James Bible (1611), cross-checked against the original Hebrew and Greek using James Strong's lexical indices (1890), and compared with Kristoforidhi's New Testament (1879), the Italian Diodati version, the Spanish Reina-Valera, and the Albanian ABS (1994). This version became available in 2026.

== See also ==
- List of Bible translations by language
