= Vaya =

Vaya may refer to:

== People ==
- Lucca Vaya (fl. 1820s), physician and participant in the Greek War of Independence
- Adelma Vay de Vaya (1840–1925), Hungarian baroness and medium and pioneer of spiritualism in Slovenia and Hungary
- José Luis García Vayá (born 1998), known as Pepelu, Spanish footballer

== Other uses ==
- Vaya (film), a 2016 South African film
- Vaya (EP), a 1999 release by American band At the Drive-In
- Vaya, Perm Krai, Russia, a rural locality
- Vaya Space, an American space launch company founded in 2017
- Vaya, an Australian mobile service provider owned by Amaysim

== See also ==
- Vaya con Dios (disambiguation)
- Vayas, Ponce, Puerto Rico, a barrio of Ponce
- Vaia (disambiguation)
