= Hecatompedum =

Coordinates: 40°15′26″N 20°04′46″E

Hecatompedum or Hekatompedon (Ancient Greek: Ἑκατόμπεδον) was an ancient Greek city in the interior of Chaonia located in the region of Epirus. Its site is tentatively located near modern Saraqinisht.

== See also ==
- List of cities in ancient Epirus
