= Gjergj Suli =

Albanian cleric and martyr (1893–1948)

Father Gjergj Suli

Gjergj Suli (1893–1948), also referred to as At Gjergj Suli was an Albanian Orthodox cleric and martyr.

== Biography ==
Gjergj Suli was born in Lekël village, Vilayet of Yannina, Ottoman Empire today modern southern Albania . His surname suggests his family may have had Souliote origin and came from that region. He took his first studies in his village school, and later attended the Greek language Zosimea gymnasium in Yannina.

In 1922, he immigrated to the USA, where he spent 12 years in Boston, Massachusetts, and Philadelphia, Pennsylvania. He was ordained a priest in US after attending a religious school. Suli had close relations with Fan Noli, both being between Orthodox clerics and activists of Vatra, the Pan-Albanian Federation of America.

Suli returned to Albania in 1934, where he started working as a priest in his native village, after that in other villages as Labovë, Tërbuq, Hundkuq etc. He was an opponent of the Italian regime established in Albania after the invasion of 1939. He was also skeptical about the bolshevist ideas which spread during World War II.

As a person with a broad culture and knowledge of several foreign languages, Suli kept correspondence with many people outside Albania, many of them being Vatra activists. His vast correspondence was one of the pretexts use by the Communist authorities which accused him of being an informer of foreign Intelligences. He was arrested in 1946, and after that suffered for several months the Gjirokastër prison. He was executed by a firing squad on January 28, 1948.

Furthermore, his personal library and correspondence letters were destroyed.

The Orthodox Autocephalous Church of Albania commemorates his death anniversary as a cleric with a broad culture and who during all his lifetime worked with devotion for the Word of God.

== See also ==
- Communism in Albania
- Religion in Albania during Communist Era
