= Stegopul =

Stegopul Stãgopul Στεγόπολη
- Village
- Location within Albania
- Coordinates: 40.094°N 20.251°E
- Country: Albania
- County: Gjirokastër
- Municipality: Libohovë
- Administrative unit: Qendër Libohovë
- Time zone: UTC+1 (CET)
  - Summer (DST): UTC+2 (CEST)

Stegopul or Stegopull (Aromanian: Stãgopul) is a village in Lunxhëri, Gjirokastër County, Albania. At the 2015 local government reform, it became part of the municipality Libohovë. It is home to the Orthodox Church of St. Elijah's, also declared a national monument.

In 1989, Stegopull counted 160 inhabitants, most of whom were Orthodox Albanians and a minority were Aromanians, but in the following year, the Aromanian community outnumbered the rest of the population.

Alternative spellings for Stegopul can be found in various languages, such as Stegopulli, Shtegopol, Stregopuli, Stegopull, Stegopol, Stegopoli and Stegopuli.

== Notable people ==
- Kyriakos Kyritsis, Greek lawyer and politician
- Ioannis Poutetsis (1878–1912), Greek revolutionary
- Urani Rumbo (1895–1936), Albanian writer
