= Kostas Krystallis =

Greek writer and poet

Costa Cristalli, known as Kostas Krystallis
- Κώστας Κρυστάλλης
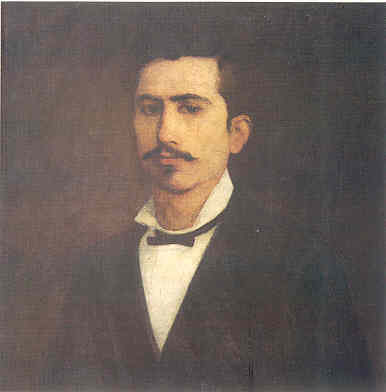
- Born: 1868; Syrrako (Epirus), Ottoman Empire (now Greece)
- Died: 1894 (aged 25–26); Arta (Epirus), Greece
- Occupations: poet, author

Kostas Krystallis (Greek: Κώστας Κρυστάλλης; 1868–1894) was an ethnic Aromanian, Greek author and poet, representative of 19th century Greek pastoral literature. He was born an Ottoman subject in Epirus, but escaped to Greece after being denounced to the authorities for writing a patriotic collection of poetry. Krystallis initially wrote his works in archaic language, but after 1891 he adopted the vernacular (Demotic) Greek language and became influenced by the New Athenian school. He was a pictorial writer, with a love of nature, while most of his work was based on traditional folk poetry.

== Life ==
Kostas Krystallis, was born in the village of Syrrako, Epirus, then Ottoman Empire. He was an Aromanian. He was the son of a local merchant. When his mother died he moved together with his father to Ioannina, where he attended the Zosimaia High School. As a pupil he wrote his first poetry collection, named Σκιαί του Άδου ("Shadows of Hades"), which consisted of three short stories, and exhibited obvious borrowings from Dante's Inferno and Homer's Odyssey. Because of this highly patriotic work he was denounced by the Ottoman authorities, and sentenced to 25 years in exile. Krystallis managed to escape to Greece at 1886.

While living in Athens he changed several jobs: initially worked as a typographer, copy editor and author in an encyclopedia, secretary for the periodical Η Εβδομάς ("The Week") and then ticket inspector in the national railway. For a short period he became author in the newspaper Φωνή της Ηπείρου (Voice of Epirus) and supported the rights of the population of his home place Epirus, which was still under Ottoman control. At 1893, he lost his job; however, he won a lottery prize and could so afford the publication of a number of works he composed that time. Krystallis died of tuberculosis on April 22, 1894, aged 26.

== Work ==
Krystallis wrote a relatively small quantity of poems and prose. His first collection Σκιαί του Άδου ("Shadows of Hades"), was finally published in 1894, the year of his death. In 1890 he composed a long narrative poem named Ο καλόγηρος της Κλεισούρας του Μεσσολογγίου ("The monk of Kleisoura of Missolonghi") and the next year his work Αγροτικά ("Pastorals") was awarded in a poetry contest. During this period, Krystallis' writing style was heavily influenced by Aristotelis Valaoritis. In 1893 he wrote his last collection Ο τραγουδιστής του χωριού και της στάνης ("The singer of the Village and the Fold") which was also praised at a poetry contest.

Krystallis initially wrote his works in archaic language and belonged to the romantic poets of the First Athenian school. However, after 1891 he adopted the vernacular (Demotic) Greek language, while he became influenced by the New Athenian school, which was dominated by Kostis Palamas, the composer of the Olympic Hymn. During this period many of his poems were mainly adaptations of oral folk poetry.

Krystallis, as well as Christos Christovasilis, composed short patriotic stories inspired by the bravery of the fighters of the Greek War of Independence (1821–1830) and especially the Souliotes. He has been described as a pastoral, rural poet who extolled nature, while on the other hand it has been claimed that he was never acclimatized to the urban environment himself.

== Legacy ==
Krystallis was one of several Greek poets and author of that era that died young. In present days, an annual festival takes place every summer at Athens, the Krystalleia, named after Kostas Krystallis, which offers performances of contemporary Greek and classical music. His house is now a museum aimed to protect Aromanian cultural heritage in the region.

== Bibliography: poetry collections and short stories ==
- Σκιαί του Άδου (Shadows of Hades)
- Ο καλόγηρος της Κλεισούρας του Μεσσολογγίου (The monk of Kleisoura of Missolonghi)
- Αγροτικά (Pastorals)
- Τραγουδιστής του χωριού και της Στάνης (The singer of the Village and the Fold)
- Πεζογραφήματα (Novels)
- Γκόλφω (Golfo)
- Ψωμοπάτης
- Αρπαγή (Seizure)
- Αθάνατο νερό (Immortal water)
- Θάνατος της βοσκοπούλας (Death of the Shepherdess)
- Αναμνήσεις (Memories)
- Όνειρο (Dream)
