= Gregory IV of Athens =

Albanian scholar and cleric

Gregory IV, (Greek: Γρηγόριος Αργυροκαστρίτης, Albanian: Grigor Gjirokastriti; died 1828) was an Albanian scholar and cleric who became Metropolitan of Athens in 1827–1828.

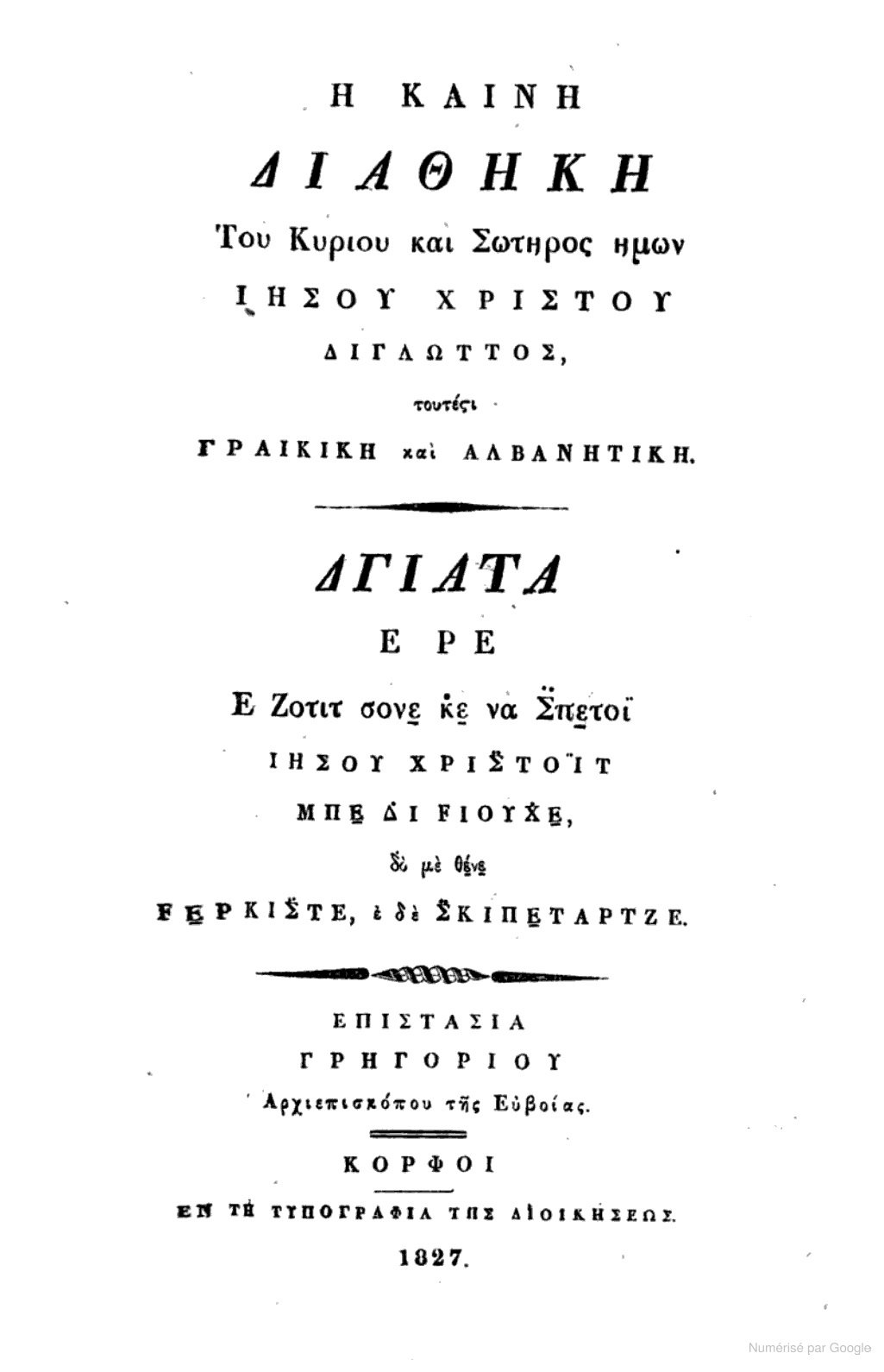
Title page of the New Testament in Greek and Albanian

Gregory was born in Gjirokastër in the mid to late-18th century. He became a teacher in the New Academy, a famous educational institution in Moscopole, and leading center of Greek culture at the time. In 1799, he was appointed Bishop of Paramythia but remained in this position for only a few months. In the same year, while Patriarch of Constantinople was Gregory V, he was appointed Archbishop of Euboea, also called "Bishop of Evripos". In the summer of 1821, when the Greek War of Independence spread to Euboea, the Turks put him under detention until January 1823.

When freed, he immediately put himself at the disposition of the Greek Revolutionary Government. In his letter to the High Parliament he thanks God for saving him from the hands of the "tyrants of the Nation", expresses his will to "do his best effort for everything for the benefit of Greece and especially for the people of this island (Euboea)" and requests the Parliament to use him "for everything that may be beneficial to the Homeland". It seems though, that before his detention Gregory had already been involved in the Revolution, because a good number of Epirots, and indeed many from Gjirokastër, had been fighting in Euboea. It is assumed by the historians that this is the reason that the Turks had arrested him.

Gregory kept on informing the central government on the situation in Euboea, but the government did not use him for the Revolution. By July 1823 the failure of Revolution in Euboea as well as the usurpation of his position by Bishop Neophytos of North Euboea, forced Gregory, among many others, to flee to Corfu retaining his title. In Corfu he translated the New Testament from ancient Greek to Albanian along with Vangjel Meksi. This work was partially published in Corfu in 1824 and fully in 1827. It contains both the Greek and the Albanian text, the latter printed in Greek letters, too. Gregory divided the originally one volume edition of 839 pages into two volumes, considering it a more suitable solution because "Albanians kept the holy scriptures close to their chest". it For this work one of his biographers Kourilas considers Gregory as "the founder of the Albanian philology" adding that "...albanologists use this translation as basic text but they only mention his (Gregory's) name ... but nothing about his home country and life" (Kourilas, p. 349).

In 1827 he returned to Euboea and on 16 September he was appointed Metropolitan of Athens and remained so until his death, in March 1828. He was buried in Chalkis, Euboea, in accordance to his will.

Eastern Orthodox Church titles
Preceded by Dionysius II	Metropolitan bishop of Athens; 16 September 1827 – March 1828	Succeeded by Anthimus VII
