= Lekël =

- Village
- Location within Albania
- Coordinates: 40°15′22″N 20°4′46″E
- Country: Albania
- County: Gjirokastër
- Municipality: Tepelenë
- Administrative unit: Qendër Tepelenë
- Time zone: UTC+1 (CET)
  - Summer (DST): UTC+2 (CEST)

Lekël (Albanian definite form: Lekli) is a community in the Gjirokastër County, southern Albania. At the 2015 local government reform it became part of the municipality Tepelenë.

Lekël was one of the Albanian Christian villages in the possession of the House of Muçohysaj the ancestral house of Ali Pasha.

Warm-summer Mediterranean climate predominates in this area.

The Albanians of the village speak in the Tosk dialect of the Albanian language.

== Notable people ==
- Anastas Byku, 19th-century Albanian publisher and journalist
- Gjergj Suli (1893–1948), Albanian Orthodox cleric and martyr
- Georgios Vagias, Greek army general
- Thanasis Vagias (1765–1834), general, counselor, and confidant of Ali Pasha
- Loukas Vagias, Greek physician and participant in the Greek War of Independence.
- Konstantinos Lagoumitzis (1781–1851), Greek, revolutionary during the Greek War of Independence, his family was originally from Lekël
