= Georgios Hatzis =

Greek author and journalist

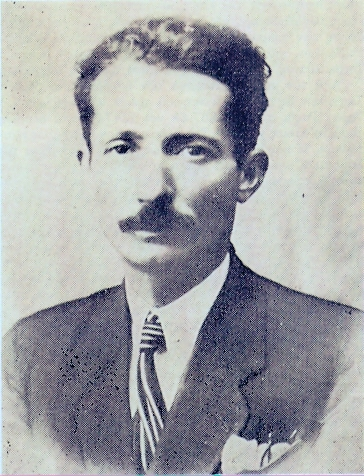
- Born: 1881; Ioannina, Epirus, then Janina Vilayet, Ottoman Empire
- Died: 1930 (aged 48–49); Athens, Greece
- Occupations: Journalist, author

Georgios Hatzis (Greek: Γεώργιος Χατζής; 1881–1930), also known under the pen name Pelleren, was a Greek author and journalist.

Hatzis was born in Ioannina, in northwestern Greece, when the city was still part of the Janina Vilayet of the Ottoman Empire. He graduated from the Zosimaia School of Ioannina and then went to the University of Athens, where he studied medicine. However, he could not finish his studies due to financial difficulties. Hatzis then went back to Ioannina and became a teacher in Vourbiani, Konitsa. In 1909 Hatzis was appointed editor of the newspaper Epirus (Ήπειρος), by the Hellenic Political Association of Ioannina. In the columns of Epirus he supported the rights of the Greek population of the region against the mismanagement and the defective administration of the Ottoman authorities of that time. Because of this activity he was sentenced to death by the Ottomans, but meanwhile, the Balkan Wars and the retreat of the Ottoman troops, saved his live. During 1914-1915 he participated in the events that occurred in Northern Epirus by the local Greeks against annexation to newly established Albania and supported the activities of the provisional government.

After the Balkan Wars and the subsequent incorporation of his home land to Greece, Hatzis supported the initiative for an organized literary club in Ioannina with its own library, in order to promote literature and arts in the city. Finally in 1924 the Educational Club (Εκπαιδευτικός Όμιλος) of Ioannina was founded and Hatzis together with other prominent figures of Epirus, such as Christos Christovasilis, became members of the administrative committee. He continued to his work in newspaper Epirus until his death in 1930.

His statue is erected at the Άλσος Ποιητών (poet's grove) in Ioannina. Hatzis had two sons, one of them, Dimitrios Hatzis, became also an author.

== Sources ==
- Sakellariou, M. V. (1997). Epirus, 4000 years of Greek history and civilization. Ekdotike Athenon. p. 480. ISBN 978-960-213-371-2.
