= Ioannis Poutetsis =

Greek revolutionary leader

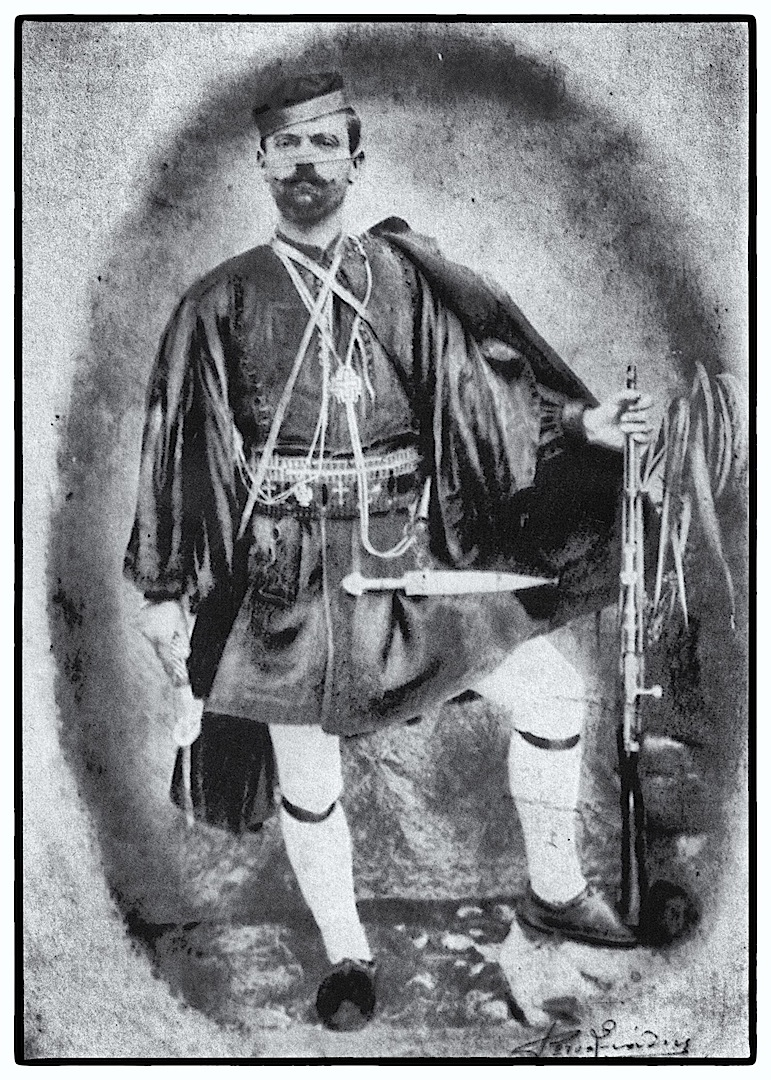
Ioannis Poutetsis

Ioannis Poutetsis (Greek: Ιωάννης Πουτέτσης, 1878–1912) was a Greek revolutionary leader from the region of Epirus, in the early 20th century.

Poutetsis was born in the village of Stegopul (Lunxhëri), near Gjirokastër, Ottoman Empire (modern Albania). From September 1908 he became the leader of one of the most notable Greek guerrilla groups that operated in the area of Ioannina before the outbreak of the imminent Balkan Wars (1912–1913), adopting the nom de guerre Vorgias.

He used the monastery of Saint Paraskevi near the village of Pramanta as his base of operations and fought several skirmishes against Ottoman detachments. On September 26, 1912, his group was defeated near Delvinë in a battle against Albanian groups and an Ottoman detachment, and Poutetsis was killed.
