= St. Elijah's Church, Stegopull =

Cultural monument of Albania

St. Elijah's Church
- Kisha e Profet Ilisë (Albanian)
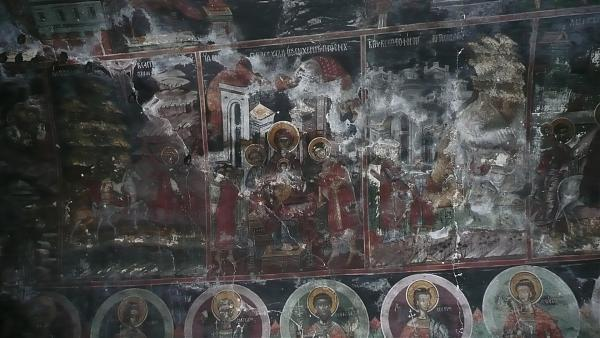
- Frescoes from the church.
- Interactive map of St. Elijah's Church
- Location: Stegopull

Cultural Monument of Albania

St. Elijah's Church (Albanian: Kisha e Profet Ilisë) is a church in Stegopull, Gjirokastër County, Albania. It is a Cultural Monument of Albania.

The church is part of the monastery dedicated to the same Saint.
