= Erind =

- Village
- Location within Albania
- Coordinates: 40°9′25″N 20°9′49″E
- Country: Albania
- County: Gjirokastër
- Municipality: Gjirokastër
- Administrative unit: Lunxhëri
- Time zone: UTC+1 (CET)
  - Summer (DST): UTC+2 (CEST)

Erind is a village in the Gjirokastër County, southern Albania. It belongs to the former Lunxhëri municipality and is part of the wider Lunxhëri region. At the 2015 local government reform it became part of the municipality Gjirokastër.

Erind was one of the Albanian Christian villages in the possession of the House of Moutzohoussates (Albanian: Muçohysaj), the ancestral house of Ali Pasha.

== Notable people ==
- Misto Mame, (1921-1942) is an Albanian World War II People's Hero.
- Sofia Noti,(1925–1944) was an Albanian World War II freedom fighter and a national martyr. A nurse, she was captured as a POW, and then hanged by the Nazi forces in the concentration camp Pavlou Mela, in Thessaloniki, Greece.
- Petro Poga, (1860–1944) was an Albanian politician who served as a delegate at the Albanian Declaration of Independence event in Vlorë, 1912, and an important Rilindas
