= Teodor Heba =

Albanian politician

16th Speaker of the Parliament of Albania
- In office 28 June 1950 – 6 June 1951
- Preceded by: Manush Myftiu
- Succeeded by: Mihal Prifti

Personal details
- Born: June 10, 1914 Tirana, Principality of Albania
- Died: May 30, 2001 (aged 86) Tirana, Albania

Teodor Heba (10 June 1914 – 30 May 2001) was an Albanian politician who served as Chairman of the People's Assembly of Albania from 1950–1951.

== Early life ==
Teodor Heba was born in Tirana on 10 June 1914. At the age of 11, he emigrated to Romania where he attended middle school and completed a 4 class superior trade school. In 1933, he returns to Albania and joins the Communist Group of Shkodër. He became a member of the Communist Party of Albania in 1941. The following year, Heba was arrested by the fascist authorities and was sentenced to 14 years imprisonment. He managed to escape from prison in July 1943.

== Political career ==
After the war, Heba was heavily involved in politics. He became a member of the Albanian Investigative Committee at the United Nations and later was elected as a member of the People's Assembly for the period from 1950–1954 and served as Chairman of the Assembly from 28 June 1950 until 6 June 1951 where he was relieved of his duties. Heba died on 30 May 2001 at the age of 86.
