= Sofia Noti =

Albanian partisan (1925–1944)

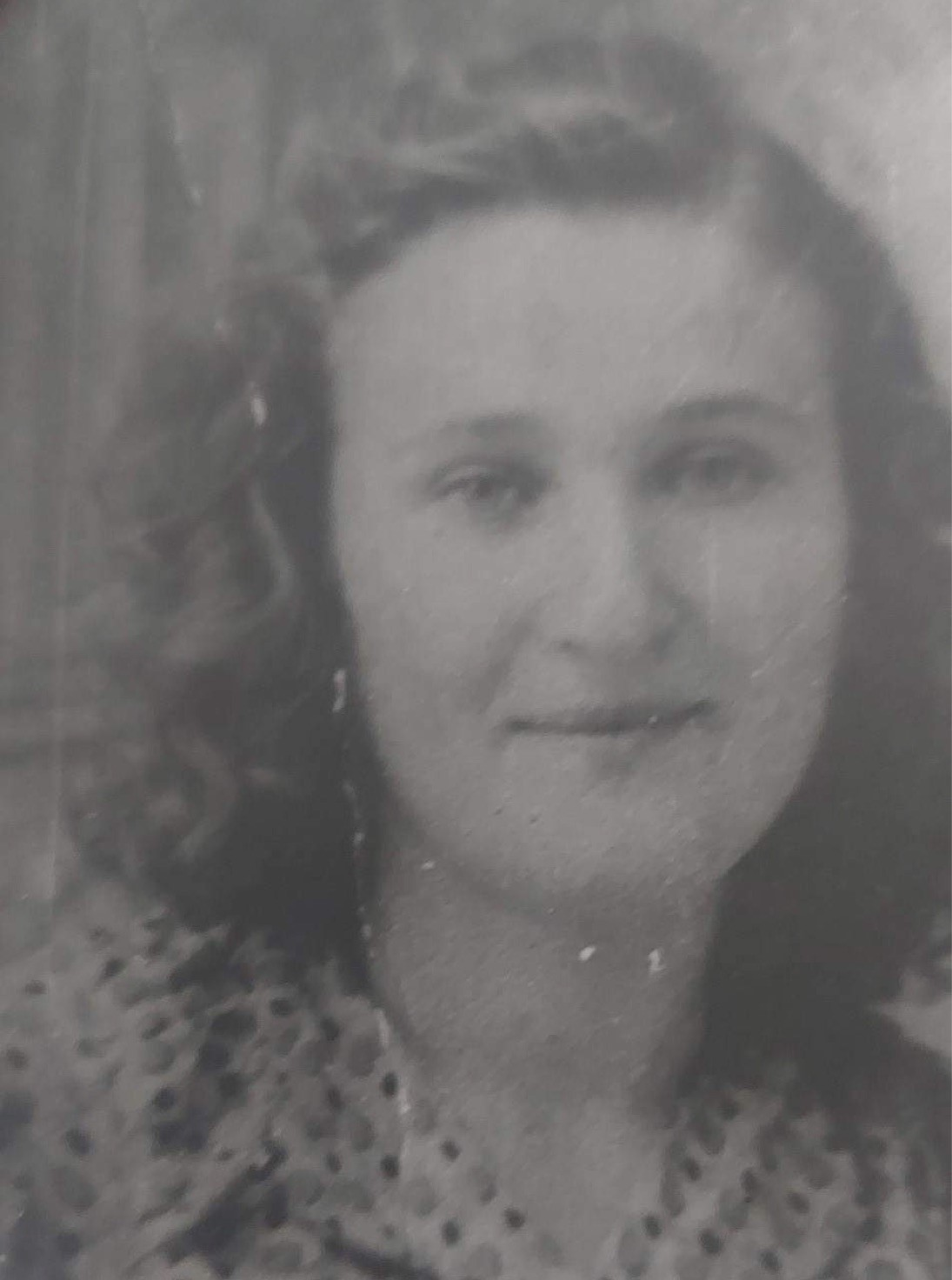
- Noti in 1943
- Born: 1925; Erind, Albania
- Died: July 1944 (aged 18–19); Thessaloniki, Greece
- Occupation: Albanian resistance in World War II
- Political party: Communist Party of Albania

Sofia Noti (1925–July 1944) was an Albanian World War II freedom fighter and a national martyr. A nurse, she was captured as a POW, and then hanged by the Nazi forces in the concentration camp Pavlou Mela, in Thessaloniki, Greece.

== Life ==
Sofia Noti was born in 1925 in Erind, Albania. Upon her father's death she had been put in an orphanage in the country's capital of Tirana, and, later, she had pursued nursing studies. In 1942 she joined the youth section of the Communist Party of Albania and, in 1943, she joined the ranks of the Brigada e III-të Sulmuese of the Albanian Liberation Army, where she became a full member of the Communist Party. Within the brigade she was part of the "Naim Frashëri" battalion, where she served both as a fighter and as the battalion's nurse.

On June 8, 1944, the Naim Frashëri battalion was at Panarit. This was shortly after the Congress of Përmet, a meeting of the Albanian communist leaders, which elected a Provisional Government. Nazi Germany forces had begun work on Operation Einhorn in Southern Albania, which had a goal of getting rid of partisan forces. The same day, the battalion, in which Noti fought, started armed skirmishes against around 100 forces from Balli Kombëtar, which the partisans managed to disperse. Two days later, the battalion fought against two convoys of Nazi German forces. During the fight, Mehmet Tahiri, a partisan, got wounded in battle, and Noti was tending to him with nursing duties. While tending to Tahiri, a Nazi soldier shot Noti with a bullet in her left thigh. She lost her senses and was captured, along with other Albanian prisoners. The prisoners were tortured and then asked to dig a collective grave for themselves. As a response, Noti started singing The Internationale to give courage to her fellow prisoners, and they all started singing. Later, the order of killing the prisoners was withdrawn, and they were all sent to the Korçë prison.

On June 23, 1944, Noti and other prisoners were sent from Korçë to Florina, Greece and from there to Thessaloniki, where they were imprisoned in the concentration camp Pavlou Mela. Noti was still injured in her leg, having had no medical attention. In July 1944 she was called by a German officer, to be hanged in the yard of the prison. She greeted all of her cellmates, among whom was People's Heroine Fato Berberi. Before getting hanged, Noti told a Nazi soldier to go away, as she would put the hanging rope on her neck herself, which she did, while shouting "Long live the Albanian Communist Party!". After those words a German soldier pushed the stool off her feet and she died. Sofia Noti is one of the 6 Albanian girls hanged by the Nazi-Fascist forces, out of 2,563 people hanged in Albania during World War II.
