= Antigonë =

- Administrative unit
- Location within Albania
- Coordinates: 40°6′N 20°14′E
- Country: Albania
- County: Gjirokastër
- Municipality: Gjirokastër

Population (2011)
  - Administrative unit: 998
- Time zone: UTC+1 (CET)
  - Summer (DST): UTC+2 (CEST)

Antigonë is a former municipality in the Gjirokastër County, southern Albania. At the 2015 local government reform it became a subdivision of the municipality Gjirokastër. The population at the 2011 census was 998. The municipal unit is known for the ancient city of Antigonia (Chaonia). The municipal unit consists of the villages Asim Zenel, Arshi Lengo, Krinë, Tranoshishtë and Saraqinisht.
