= Dimitrios Hatzis =

Greek novelist and journalist

Dimitrios Hatzis (Greek: Δημήτριος Χατζής, 13 November 1913 – 20 July 1981) was a Greek novelist and journalist.

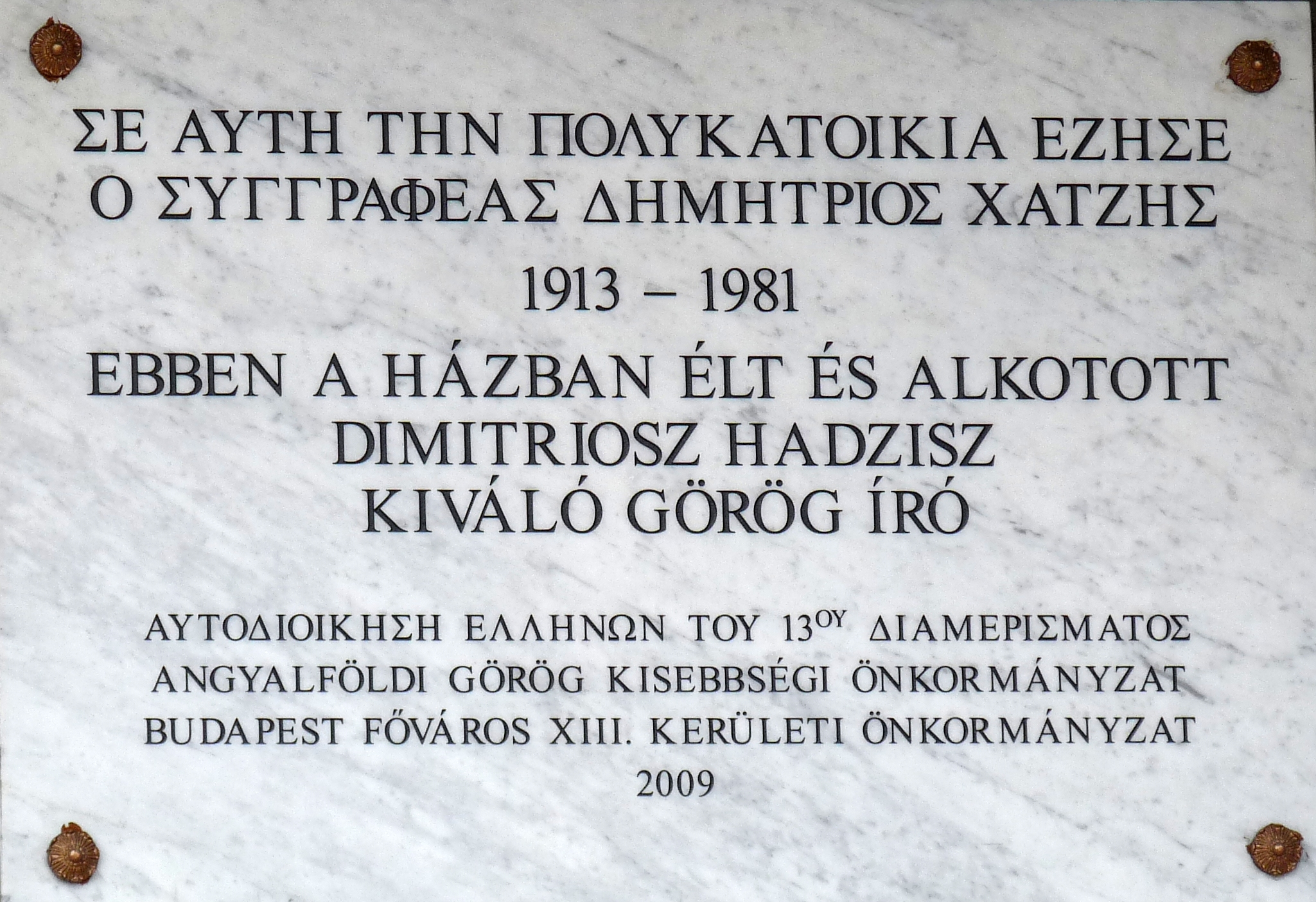
A plaque in Budapest, commemorating the life of Dimitris Hatzis. The first line in Greek means "in this building lived the author Dimitrios Hatzis".

Hatzis was born in Ioannina (Epirus) northwestern Greece, the son of the author and journalist, Georgios Hatzis. He graduated from the Zosimaia school in his home land. In 1930, after the death of his father, he succeeded him as director of the newspaper Epirus. In 1932-1934 he was influenced by Marxist ideologies and joined the Communist Party of Greece. In 1936 he was arrested by the regime of Ioannis Metaxas for communist activity.

Hatzis got involved in the Greek Civil War (1946-1949), where he joined the Democratic Army of Greece (DSE). As a result, following the Left's defeat, he went into exile and until the legalization of the Greek Communist Party in 1975, he lived in various socialist countries in Eastern Europe.

In 1962 Hatzis took up a position at the Byzantine Studies Department at the University of Budapest. There he taught Greek and modern Greek literature. He also worked on the translation and anthology of a wealth of texts in the Hungarian language. Through this work, Hatzis established Greek Studies in Hungary and contributed to the spread of Greek culture.

Famous works of Hatzis include:

- Το τέλος της μικρής μας πόλης (The end of our small town), 1960.
- Ανυπεράσπιστοι (Defenceless), 1966.
- Το Διπλό Βιβλίο (The double book), 1976, considered as one of the most important novels in post-war Greek literature.
- Σπουδές (Studies), 1976.
