= Kostandin Kristoforidhi =

Albanian translator and scholar (1827–1895)

Kostandin Kristoforidhi NK
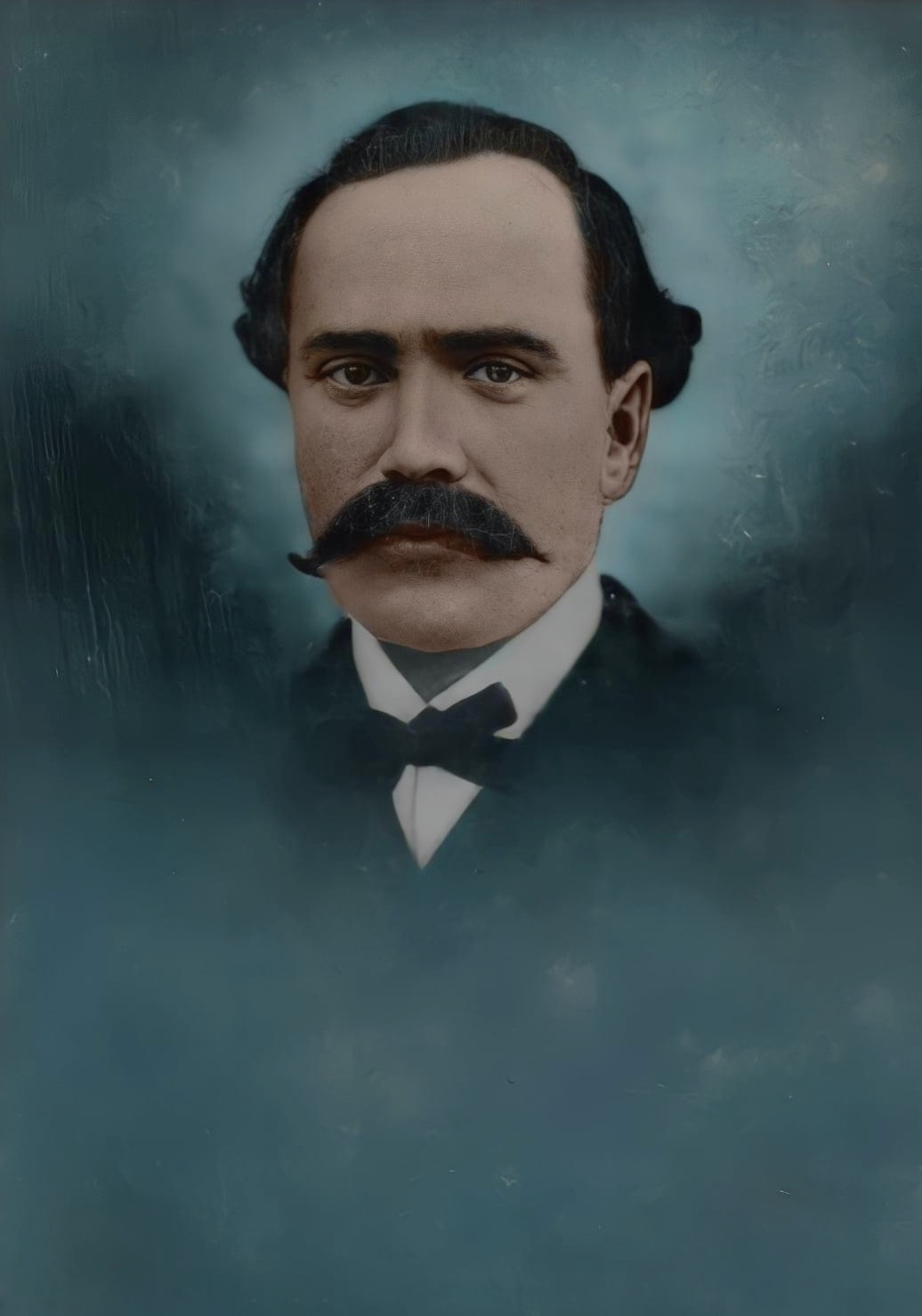
- Photograph of Kostandin Kristoforidhi
- Born: 22 May 1827; Elbasan, Ottoman Empire (now Albania)
- Died: 7 March 1895 (aged 67)
- Citizenship: Ottoman
- Education: Zosimaia School, Malta Protestant College
- Occupations: Translator, writer
- Writing career
- Period: 1846–1895
- Notable work: Translation of the New Testament

Kostandin Nelko (22 May 1827 – 7 March 1895), known as Kostandin Kristoforidhi, was an Albanian translator and scholar. He is mostly known for having translated the New Testament into Albanian for the first time in the Gheg Albanian dialect in 1872. He also provided a translation in Tosk Albanian in 1879 thereby improving the 1823 Tosk version of Vangjel Meksi. By providing translation in both dialects, he has the merit of founding the basis of the unification of both dialects into a national language.

== Life ==
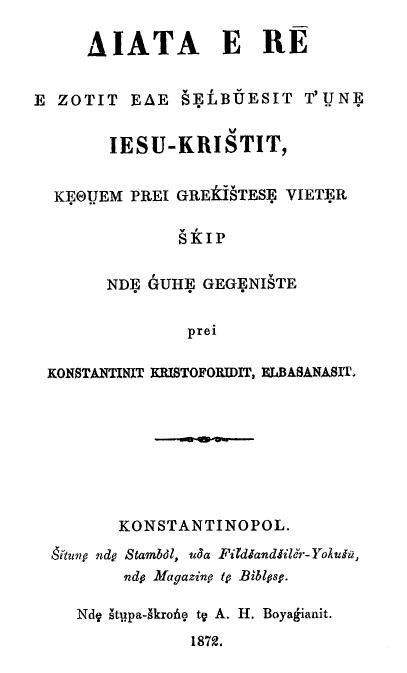
Kostandin Kristoforidhi's New Testament in the Gheg dialect

He was born in Elbasan. From 1847 studied at the Zosimea Greek college in Ioannina, where he became friends with Johann Georg von Hahn by helping him learn Albanian and write a German-Albanian dictionary. In 1856 or 1857 he joined a Protestant church in Izmir after his conversion to Protestantism, thus becoming the first known Albanian Protestant.

He went to Istanbul in 1857, and drafted a Memorandum for the Albanian language. He stayed in Malta until 1860 in a Protestant seminary, finishing the translation of The New Testament in the Tosk and Gheg dialects. He was helped by Nikolla Serreqi from Shkodër with the Gheg version of the Testament. Nikolla Serreqi was also the proponent for the use of the Latin alphabet, which had already been used by the early writers of the Albanian literature and Kristoforidhi embraced the idea of a Latin alphabet.

He went to Tunis, where he worked as a teacher until 1865, when a representative of the British and Foreign Bible Society contracted him to work for the company to produce Bible translations into Albanian. He published in 1866 the first Gheg translation of the four gospels and the Acts of the Apostles; for the many years to come, he continued his work, publishing in the Tosk and Gheg dialects The Psalms (1868, 1869); The New Testament (1879, 1869), Genesis and Exodus (Tosk, 1880); Deuteronomy (Tosk, 1882); The Proverbs and the Book of Isaiah (Tosk, 1884).

Kristoforidhi became a member of the Central Committee for Defending Albanian Rights (founded 1877) which was a group of Albanian intelligentsia based in Istanbul advocating for the territorial integrity and unity of Albanian inhabited areas in the Ottoman Empire. During the Great Eastern Crisis, Kristoforidhi criticized some League of Prizren notables and viewed their actions as being based on self interest, preservation of the sultan's power and "Muslim dominance" instead of the national interest.

He viewed the development of the Albanian language as important for the preservation of the Albanian people and devoted much of his lifetime toward studying and recording the language by traveling throughout Albania to collect material. The result of those endeavours was his most important work, The Dictionary of the Albanian Language (Greek: Λεξικόν της Αλβανικής Γλώσσης) – (Albanian: Fjalori i Gjuhës Shqipe), was published in Athens, Greece, in 1904, 25 years after it had been drafted by Kristoforidhi and after his death. It was written in Greek.

He knew Albanian (Tosk and Gheg dialects), Greek, Latin, Hebrew, English, Italian, Turkish, Bulgarian, Arabic, French and German.

== Works ==
- Historia e shkronjësë shënjtëruarë. (1872)
- Λεξικὸν τῆς ἀλβανικῆς γλώσσης Lexikon tēs albanikēs glōssēs (Greek-Albanian Dictionary)
- Γραμματική τῆς γλώσσης κατὰ τὴν τοσκικὴν διάλεκτον Grammatikē tēs glossēs kata tēn toskikēn dialekton (1882)
- Abetare. (ABC-Primer, Gheg 1867, Tosk 1868)

== Notes ==
1. The form Constantine Christophorides was used in the English language during the nineteenth and twentieth centuries

== Bibliography ==
- Akademia e Shkencave e Shqipërisë (2008) (in Albanian), Fjalor Enciklopedik Shqiptar 2 (Albanian encyclopedia), Tirana, ISBN 978-99956-10-28-9
- Mann, Stuart: Albanian Literature: An Outline of Prose, Poetry, and Drama, London 1955.
- Gawrych, George W.: The Crescent and the Eagle: Ottoman Rule, Islam and the Albanians, 1874–1913, New York 2006.
- Lloshi, Xhevat (2008). Rreth Alfabetit te Shqipes. Logos. ISBN 9789989582684.
