= Kyriakos Kyritsis =

Greek lawyer and politician

Kyriakos Kyritsis (Greek: Κυριάκος Κυρίτσης) was a Greek lawyer and politician from the village of Stegopul (Lunxhëri), in modern southern Albania. He supported financially the local Greek revolt of 1878 against Ottoman rule. Because of this involvement his possessions in Butrint-Saranda area were confiscated.

When his homeland came under Greek administration (October 1914 – September 1916), he was elected as member of the Greek Parliament for the Argyrokastro Prefecture in the following elections (December 1915).
