= Loukas Vagias =

Physician and participant in the Greek War of Independence

Loukas Vagias (Greek: Λουκάς Βάγιας), also referred as Loukas Vaya, Lucas Bia, Lucca Vaya, Lluka (Luka) Vaja, was a Greek physician and participant in the Greek War of Independence. He is remembered as the personal doctor of Ali Pasha, the Phanariot nobleman Alexandros Mavrokordatos, and Lord Byron.

== Biography ==
Loukas was born in the village of Lekël in Lunxhëri region, then Pashalik of Yanina, Ottoman Empire, today Tepelenë District, Albania. He was the younger brother of Thanasis Vagias, chief commander of Ali Pasha. They had two other brothers, Yannis and Christakis. According to some sources, Loukas' (and Thanasis') intrigues were the main driver for Vangjel Meksi to leave Ali Pasha's cabinet and escape to Corfu.

Loukas married the daughter of Athanasios Psalidas, one of the main representatives of the Modern Greek Enlightenment and member of Ali Pasha's council. He is mentioned as an excellent doctor, studied in Wien, Austrian Empire. Loukas Vagias joined the Greek Revolution and gave immense contribution during the Third Siege of Missolonghi. He was buried in Argos.

== See also ==
- Thanasis Vagias
- Lunxhëri Region
- Greek War of Independence
- Pashalik of Yanina
