= Mihal Prifti =

Albanian politician and diplomat

17th Speaker of the Parliament of Albania
- In office 6 June 1951 – 19 July 1954
- Preceded by: Teodor Heba
- Succeeded by: Gogo Nushi

Personal details
- Born: 25 September 1918 Gjatë, Gjirokastër, Albania
- Died: 16 March 1986 (aged 67) Tirana, Albania

Mihal Prifti (25 September 1918 – 16 March 1986) was an Albanian politician and diplomat. He served as Chairman of the Assembly of the Republic of Albania from 1951 to 1954. A native of Lunxhëri, he later served as Albania's first ambassador to the Soviet Union.

== Early life ==
Mihal Prifti was born in the village of Gjatë, Gjirokastër on 25 September 1918, to an Albanian, Orthodox Christian family whom spoke Albanian within the Tosk dialect . His surname Prifti suggests his ancestor was a priest because Prifti is priest in Albanian. At the age of 11, he moved to Athens, Greece with his family and there attended secondary school. Later he enrolled at the University of Athens, majoring in physics and mathematics. After a brief time at the university, he moved on to pursue his studies in Italy and in March 1941 enrolled at the University of Rome, Faculty of Engineering. In 1942 he returned to Albania and was appointed professor at the Trade Institute of Vlorë.

== Political career ==
Prifti's involvement in the War of Liberation began with his enrollment in the 1st Brigade. He was later assigned as a Commisar in the 2nd Division and by October 1944 was in charge of its political section. From December 1944 to March 1945 Prifti served as Commisar of the 1st Division. The following month, he was named as Secretary General of the Government. From 1947 onwards, he held several diplomatic posts, first as ambassador to the Soviet Union and later China. He also served as Deputy Minister of Foreign Affairs. Prifti was elected a member of the People's Assembly from 1952 to 1960 and served as Chairman of the Assembly from 1951 to 1954. From 1961 to 1975 he was director of the Pedagogical Institute of Shkodër. He died on March 16, 1986, in Tirana.
