= Lunxhëri (administrative unit) =

- Administrative unit
- Location within Albania
- Country: Albania
- County: Gjirokastër
- Municipality: Gjirokastër

Population (2011)
  - Administrative unit: 1,941
- Time zone: UTC+1 (CET)
  - Summer (DST): UTC+2 (CEST)

Lunxhëri is a former municipality in the Gjirokastër County, Albania. At the 2015 local government reform it became a subdivision of the municipality Gjirokastër. The population at the 2011 census was 1,941. The municipal unit consists of the villages Qestorat, Dhoksat, Këllëz, Mingul, Nokovë, Erind, Gjat, Kakoz, Karjan and Valare.

The area is known for its Orthodox Christian Albanian and Aromanian population.

== See also ==
- Lunxhëri region
