= Christos Christovasilis =

Greek journalist and author

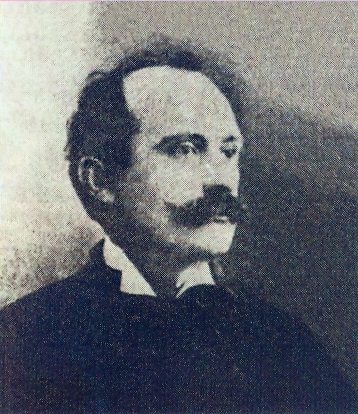
- Born: 12 March 1861; Soulopoulo, Zitsa, Epirus, Ottoman Empire
- Died: 26 August 1937 (aged 76); Ioannina, Greece
- Occupations: Journalist, author

Christos Christovasilis (Greek: Χρήστος Χρηστοβασίλης; c. 12 March 1861 – 26 August 1937) was a Greek journalist and author, representative of Greek pastoral literature. He was a collector of rural and folk material and one of the most important figures in the literature of Epirus in late 19th-early 20th century.

== Life ==
Christovasilis was born in the village of Soulopoulo, Zitsa, Epirus, then in the Ottoman Empire. As a teenager he ran away from school in order to join the Epirus revolt of 1878, and participated in the guerilla operations near Sarandë. As a result, he was twice arrested by the Ottoman authorities and sentenced to death, but he managed to escape. In 1885 he moved to Athens, where he studied, compiled and published several works on Greek history. In December 1889 he won the literary competition of the Athenian newspaper Acropolis, with his countryside tale Pastoral new year. He subsequently decided to devote himself to journalism and literature. When the Balkan Wars (1912–1913) ended and most of Epirus became part of Greece, he moved to Ioannina and published a newspaper named Ελευθερία ("Freedom"). In 1924, he became a member of the administrative committee of the Educational Club (Εκπαιδευτικός Όμιλος) of Ioannina. together with other prominent figures of Epirus, such as Georgios Hatzis. Additionally, in 1936 he published the cultural magazine Epirote Leaves. Christovasilis was twice elected as a member of the Greek Parliament, in 1926 and 1935.

== Work ==
Christovasilis was a collector of rural and folk material and one of the main representatives of Greek pastoral literature of that era. He wrote his works in the Demotic (vernacular) language, which he called "koine of the future". His work was inspired by high degree of patriotism aimed against Ottoman rule. Christovassilis best prose is gathered in the Stories of Exile (1889) and in Stories from the Stockyard (1898), a compilation of eleven stories inspired from his rural childhood. Additionally, in 1901 he published the Tales of the Mountain and the Valley, which earned him another literary prize, promulgated by the supporter of the Demotic language, Ioannis Psycharis.
