= Labovë =

Labovë or Labova may refer to the following places in Albania:

- Labovë e Madhe, a village in the municipality of Gjirokastër, Gjirokastër County
- Labovë e Vogël, a village in the municipality of Gjirokastër, Gjirokastër County
- Labovë e Kryqit, a village in the municipality of Libohovë, Gjirokastër County
- Labovë e Poshtme, part of Labovë e Kryqit
- Labovë e Sipërme, part of Labovë e Kryqit
