= Metropolis of Paramythia, Filiates, Giromeri and Parga =

Coordinates: 39°28′N 20°30′E

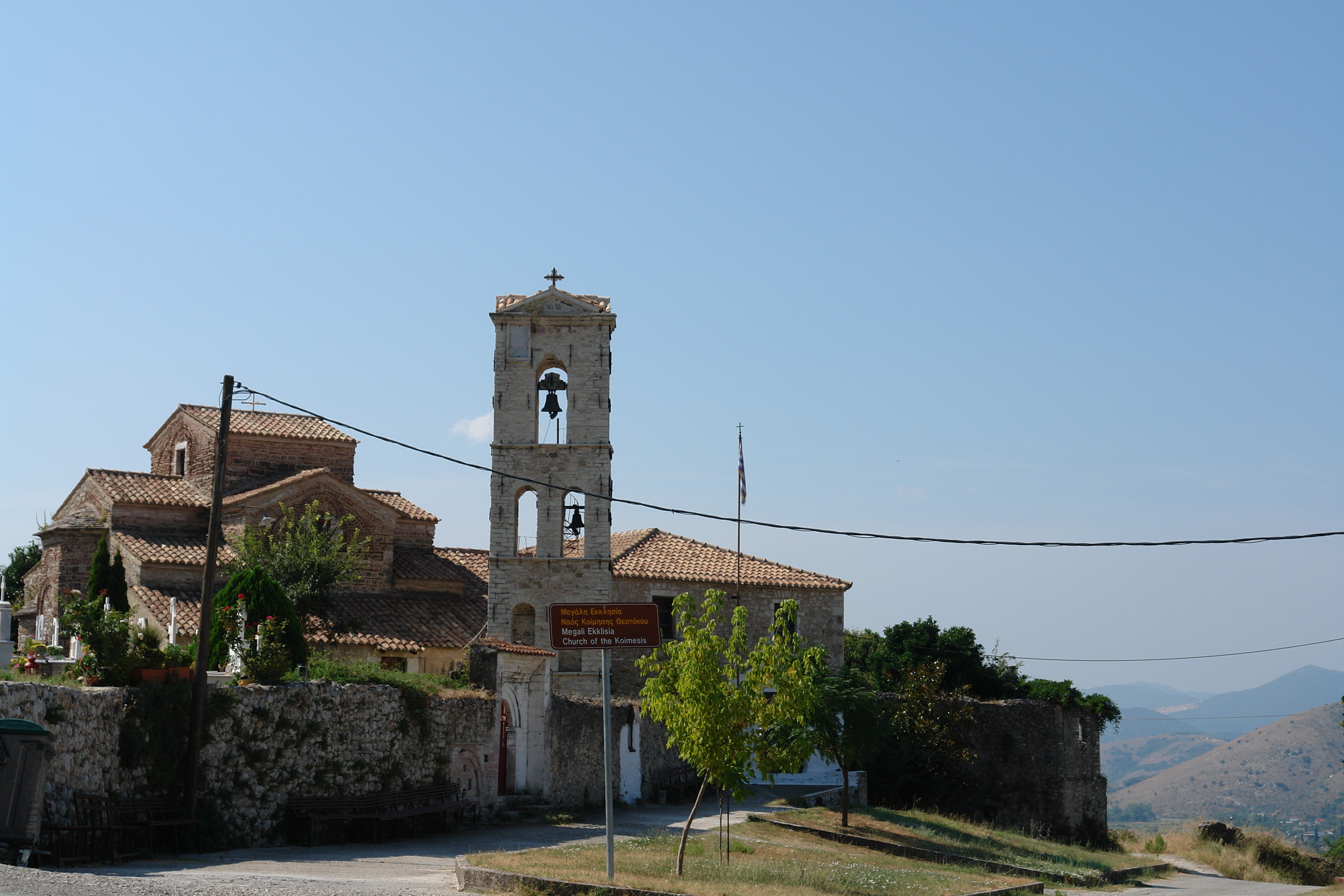
Byzantine church in Paramythia

The Metropolis of Paramythia, Filiates, Giromeri and Parga (Greek: Ιερά Μητρόπολις Παραμυθίας, Φιλιατών, Γηρομερίου και Πάργας) is one of the metropolises of the New Lands in Greece that are within the jurisdiction of the Ecumenical Patriarchate of Constantinople but de facto are administered for practical reasons as part of the Church of Greece under an agreement between the churches of Athens and Constantinople. (Note: "Codified in the 1928 Patriarchal and Synodical Act, the "New Lands" were entrusted to the temporary stewardship of the Church of Greece, provided that the Church respected the terms of the Act. The Act subsequently has been incorporated into several pieces of Greek legislation (Laws 3615/1928, 5438/1932, 599/1977, and Article 3, paragraph 1 of the current Greek Constitution), thereby recognizing the ecclesiastical agreement between the two sides.") It encompasses the Thesprotia Prefecture and the area of Parga in Preveza Prefecture. The current Metropolitan is, since 1974, Titos Papanakos.

== History ==
The modern metropolitan see is relatively recent, having emerged from the former Bishopric of Paramythia by an act of the Patriarchate of Constantinople in 1895. The Bishopric of Paramythia itself existed since the 15th century, and was the successor to the ancient Bishopric of Buthrotum.

The area has a rich ecclesiastical tradition, and has hosted several other bishoprics in the past:

- the Bishopric of Euroea, attested in the 4th–8th centuries
- the Bishopric of Photice, attested since the 5th century, became the Bishopric of Paramythia in the 18th century
- the Bishopric of Buthrotum, attested since the 5th century, but transferred to Paramythia in the 15th century; the title "Bishop of Buthrotum" remained current until the 18th century
- the Bishopric of Elaea, attested only in antiquity
- the Bishopric of Giromeri, founded in 1800, and merged with the Bishopric of Paramythia in 1895 to form the modern metropolitan see
- the Metropolis of Filiates and Giromeri, established briefly in 1924–1928

== Metropolitans ==
Since its establishment in 1895, there have been 15 Metropolitans:

1. Leontios Eleftheriadis (1895-1896)
2. Konstantinos Mikroulis (1896-1897)
3. Vasileios Papachristou (1897-1900)
4. Kallinikos Palaiokrasas (1900-1906)
5. Ierotheos Anthoulidis (1906-1909)
6. Neofytos Kotzamanidis (1909-1924)
7. Ioakeim Martinianos (1924-1925)
8. Athenagoras Eleftheriou (1925-1932)
9. Georgios Misailidis (1932-1942)
10. Kyrillos Karbaliotis (1942-1943)
11. Dorotheos Naskaris (1943-1952)
12. Dorotheos Vasilas (1952-1957)
13. Titos Matthaiakis (1957-1968)
14. Pavlos Karvelis (1968-1974)
15. Titos Papanakos (1974-)

== Bibliography ==
- Kiminas, Demetrius (2009). The Ecumenical Patriarchate: A History of Its Metropolitanates with Annotated Hierarch Catalogs. Wildside Press LLC. ISBN 9781434458766.
