= Hormovë =

- Village
- Location within Albania
- Coordinates: 40°14′20″N 20°6′4″E
- Country: Albania
- County: Gjirokastër
- Municipality: Tepelenë
- Administrative unit: Qendër Tepelenë
- Time zone: UTC+1 (CET)
  - Summer (DST): UTC+2 (CEST)

Hormovë (Albanian definite form: Hormova) is a community in Gjirokastër County, southern Albania. At the 2015 local government reform it became part of the municipality Tepelenë.

== History ==
Hormovë was one of the Albanian Christian villages in the possession of the House of Meçohysaj the ancestral house of Ali Pasha. It was the largest and militarily strongest village of the region of Rrëzë (Riza).

During his stay in Hormovë in 1769, the Serbian monk Dositej Obradović estimated its size at around 700 houses, all built in stone. The group of 20 locals who greeted him on arrival offered to house him at the Saint Nicholas Monastery, which they claimed could house ten monks, but it was empty because they, as Albanians, do not like to be monks.

In 1784, Hormovë was attacked and destroyed by the local Ottoman Albanian ruler Ali Pasha as their loyalty to him had been uncertain after having abused his mother. Ali also roasted alive the village's leader, Çavuş Prift, while all men of the village were murdered and the women and children were sold to slavery.

In 1798, Sheh Mehmet Cama from Golem built a Halveti tekke in the village.

In 1821, when the Greek War of Independence broke up, a number of locals formed armed groups and supported the Independence struggle in Peloponnese and Central Greece, under leaders such as Diamantes and Kostas Chormovas (later known as Lagoumitzis).

In 1914, over 200 villagers from Hormovë were assembled and burned alive by irregular Greek troops of the Autonomous Republic of Northern Epirus. A grave of 69 men, women and children was found in the premises of the monastery of St. Mary, north of the village of Kodër. A lapidary in the village commemorates this massacre.

This massacre made a strong impression on various political personalities in Europe. Colonel Willem De Veer, of the Dutch mission, reported to the ICC that:

South of the village of Kodra (Hormova), I found a little church which was undoubtedly used as a prison. In the interior the walls and the floor were washed in blood, everywhere were caps and clothing soaked in blood. The doctor, member of the Commission of Investigation, himself saw human brains. At the altar we found a human heart which was still bleeding. A hundred and ninety-five bodies were dug out because the ditch they were thrown in was too shallow, so as to bury them in deeper graves; all the bodies were without heads.

— Willem De Veer

Aubrey Herbert addressed passionately this tragic event in a speech to the House of Commons proposing military intervention to stop this campaign of massacres.

During World War II, the advancing Greek forces managed to enter the village after the Italian retreat, on 11 December 1940.

== Notable people ==
- Konstantinos Lagoumitzis (1781–1827), fighter of the Greek War of Independence.
