= Labovë e Vogël =

- Village
- Location within Albania
- Coordinates: 40°11′50″N 20°08′20″E
- Country: Albania
- County: Gjirokastër
- Municipality: Gjirokastër
- Administrative unit: Odrie
- Time zone: UTC+1 (CET)
  - Summer (DST): UTC+2 (CEST)

Labovë e Vogël (Albanian for "Small Labovë") is a village in the former Odrie municipality, Gjirokastër County, Southern Albania. At the 2015 local government reform it became part of the municipality Gjirokastër. It lies about 1 km south of the village Labovë e Madhe and 13 km north of the city Gjirokastër.
