= Vangjel Meksi =

Albanian physician, writer and translator

- Born: 1770; Labovë, Pashalik of Yanina, Ottoman Empire, now (Gjirokastër District, in modern Albania)
- Died: 1823 (aged 53); Tripolitsa, Ottoman Empire, now modern Greece
- Occupations: Physician, philologist, and translator
- Writing career
- Notable works: Translation of the New Testament into Albanian, Albanian language grammar

Vangjel Meksi (1770–1823) was an Albanian medical doctor, writer, and translator. One-time personal physician to Ali Pasha, the 19th-century Albanian ruler of the Pashalik of Yanina, Meksi produced the first translation of the New Testament into Albanian with the help and sponsorship of the British and Foreign Bible Society (BFBS). Meksi did not live to see his work's publication however, which was supervised by Gregory IV of Athens. As a member of Filiki Etaireia, a secret society whose purpose was to establish an independent Greek state, Meksi joined the Greeks in the Siege of Tripolitsa during their war of independence against the Ottoman Empire and died shortly afterwards.

As well as its value to Albanian Christians, who could for the first time read the Gospels in their own language, Meksi's work advanced the study of written Albanian, and in particular informed the work of 19th-century linguists and philologists such as Joseph Ritter von Xylander, August Schleicher, and Johann Georg von Hahn. Their studies of the Albanian language were significantly influenced by Meksi's Bible translation.

== Early life ==
Meksi was born in 1770 in Labovë, a village near Gjirokastër, and pursued secondary studies in Ioannina, then an important Ottoman provincial center (now in Greece). His first employment was as a folk physician to the court of Ali Pasha, the Albanian ruler of the Pashalik of Yanina, a position he held until 1803. Armed with a letter of recommendation from Ali Pasha, Meksi was admitted to the University of Naples in Italy, where he studied medicine under Dr. Nicola Acuto and practiced in a hospital administered by the parish of San Giovanni a Carbonara. After completing his studies in 1808, Meksi returned to Yanina and once again served in Ali Pasha's court, this time as one of his four physicians. His colleagues were Dr. Metaxa, (degree in medicine from the University of Paris), Dr. Saqeralliu (degree in medicine from the University of Vienna), and Dr. Loukas Vagias, (brother of Thanasis Vagias, with a degree in medicine from Leipzig University).

== Philological activity ==
After falling out of favor with Ali Pasha, for reasons unknown, Meksi left the court in 1810 to travel around Europe. During a brief stay in Venice he began to develop an interest in the Albanian alphabet and grammar. He published two translations into Albanian during 1814, both now lost, one of which was a religious work by Abbé Claude Fleury (1640–1723).

Meksi also wrote a grammar of the Albanian language in Albanian. It too has been lost, but it is mentioned in many letters reporting Meksi's work as an Albanian philologist written by Robert Pinkerton to his superiors at the British and Foreign Bible Society (BFBS), which subsequently sponsored the translation of the New Testament into Albanian. The work must have been written before 1819 and may be either the first Albanian grammar or the second, after that of Jani Evstrat Vithkuqari; it is not known which was published first.

In this period Meksi also created a new Albanian alphabet, rationalizing and consolidating the many different pre-existing alphabets, employing a mix of Greek and Latin characters. Using his new alphabet, he wrote a book called Orthography of the Albanian language, (Albanian: Drejtshkrimi i gjuhës shqipe).

== Translation of the New Testament ==
Pinkerton, who in 1816 was the BFBS's representative in Moscow, had met that year with a community of Albanians in Vienna, then capital of the Austrian Empire. They assured him that a translation of the New Testament into Albanian was indeed possible. In a letter to his superiors at the BFBS, dated August 28, 1816, Pinkerton wrote that the Albanian nation occupied a large part of the ancient Illyria, that they spoke a language completely different from Slavic, Turkish, Greek, or Latin, and that for the Albanian Orthodox the mass was recited in Greek, a language that believers and even some of the priests did not understand. According to Pinkerton, the translation could be done by one or more Albanians from the Ionian islands under the supervision of an Albanian bishop.

In 1819, apparently with the blessing of his superiors at the BFBS, Pinkerton met with Meksi (referring him as Evangelos Mexicos) in Istanbul. Meksi, who was then a teacher in Serres, had been recommended to Pinkerton because of his Albanian grammar book. Pinkerton also relates in one of his letters to the BFBS that Meksi was well regarded by the Albanian community, the Greek Orthodox Church, and by Patriarch Gregory V of Constantinople. Gregory, according to Pinkerton, also offered to find two suitable clergymen to assist Meksi in his endeavor. Lastly, Pinkerton recommended that the Greek alphabet be used as the most suitable for the Albanian language. On October 19, 1819, Pinkerton and Meksi concluded a contract to translate the New Testament into Albanian on behalf of the society. It was agreed that the Bible would have to be translated into the Albanian dialect of Yanina. Meksi completed the work in two years, ten months earlier than the contract's deadline.

Early in 1821 Mr. Leeves of the BFBS visited Thessaloniki to supervise the translation. On February 8, 1821, he wrote that the work had been completed, and that the only outstanding task was a final review by a competent person, who had already been assigned to the task. In 1822 the revised manuscript was sent to Malta to be printed, and in 1823 Leeves sent from Malta to the representative of the society in Corfu the first copy of a printed New Testament in Albanian. Meanwhile, the New Testament had had a final revision performed by the Archimandrite of Euboea, Grigor Gjirokastriti, an Albanian who subsequently became Archbishop Gregory IV of Athens. Archimandrite Grigor had recommended that the Bible be printed in a large typeface in two columns, one in Albanian and the other in modern Greek, because Albanians would rather read modern Greek than Koine.

On March 16, 1824, Mr. Lowndes, the BFBS's secretary in Corfu, sent a letter to the society in which he mentioned that the sum paid to Meksi for his work was 6,000 piastras and that Archimandrite Grigor was paid 60 crowns. On September 5, 1824, the Saint Matthew's Gospel was published in Albanian. According to Lowndes' letters, the Albanian community of Missolonghi was extremely excited when mass was said with a piece from Saint Matthew, as since its translation they had been impatient to hear it in Albanian. In July 1827 the form in which the first 500 copies of the New Testament were to be bound was decided in London. The entire edition amounted to 2,000 copies.

Although Gjirokastriti's edition of the New Testament was written in Albanian, it used the Greek alphabet. It is not known which alphabet Meksi used in his own manuscript.

The Ecumenical Patriarchate of Constantinople was not against the work of Meksi or the Bible Society at that time. On the contrary, for the translation the British missionaries successfully appealed to Gregory V and enlisted the help of an Orthodox bishop, Gjirokastriti, for the final edition of the New Testament in Albanian.

== Greek War of Independence ==
Meksi was a member of the Filiki Etaireia, a secret society whose purpose was to overthrow Ottoman rule over the Balkans and to establish an independent Greek state. When the Greek War of Independence broke out in 1821, after his translation had been completed, Meksi joined the Greeks in the Siege of Tripolitsa. Despite suffering from a serious bout of pneumonia, he continued to work as a physician during the war. He is also said to have taken part in the negotiations leading to an agreement proposed by Theodoros Kolokotronis that permitted the Albanians who were defending Tripolitsa to leave unharmed, an arrangement that helped the Greeks to capture the town from the Turks.

== Legacy ==
Meksi did not live to see the 1827 publication of his translation of the New Testament; he had died a bachelor six years earlier, at the age of about 51. The first publication of a Bible translation from Greek to a modern Balkanic language, it ran to 2,000 copies, a huge number for the time. It preceded the modern Bulgarian version by two years and the Romanian translation by twenty. A second edition was published in 1858 in Athens, but as it had not been revised by any native speakers of Albanian it was full of errors.

Meksi's work was important for the development of written Albanian, and his endeavors strengthened the conviction that a stable Albanian alphabet had to be created. His translation served as the basis for Joseph Ritter von Xylander's studies of the Albanian language, which definitively refuted the thesis that the language had a Tatar origin. Von Xylander concluded that Albanian had an Indo-European root.

Two other international scholars also studied the Albanian language mainly based on Meksi's translation of the New Testament: August Schleicher, who stated that his knowledge of the conjugation of Albanian verbs was based on Meksi's work, and Johann Georg von Hahn an Austrian diplomat, philologist, and specialist in Albanian history, language, and culture, who translated the Bible into Gheg Albanian with the help of Kostandin Kristoforidhi.

== Sources ==
- Lloshi, Xhevat (2008). Rreth Alfabetit te shqipes [Around the Albanian Alphabet]. Logos. p. 23. ISBN 978-9989582684.
- Clayers, Nathalie (2007). Aux origines du nationalisme albanais: la naissance d'une nation majoritairement musulmane en Europe [At the Origins of the Albanian Nationalism: The birth of a mainly Muslim Nation in Europe]. KARTHALA Editions. p. 182. ISBN 978-2-84586-816-8.
- Kastrati, Jup (2000). Historia e albanologjise (1497-1997) [History of Albanology (1497-1997))]. Library of Congress: Soros Foundation. p. 516. ISBN 99927-43-12-3.
- Meksi, Vangjel (2000). Labova ndër shekuj [Labova through the Centuries)]. Bavarian State Library (BSB): Toena. p. 46. ISBN 99927-1-243-0. OCLC 163354343.
- Meksi, Fedhon (2010). Labova e Madhe dhe Labovitët. Migjeni. ISBN 978-9995671891.
