= Misto Mame =

Albanian partisan (1921–1942)

- Born: 1921; Erind, Gjirokastër, Principality of Albania
- Died: 16 August 1942 (age 21); Tirana, Italian-occupied Albania
- Known for: Partisan during the War of Liberation
- Awards: Hero of the People

Misto Mame was an Albanian World War II People's Hero. He was killed in action against Fascist Italian forces on 16 August 1942.

Mame was born in 1921 in Erind, Gjirokastër. He was an active participant in the antifascist demonstration and member of the Committee of Tirana of the Party of Labour of Albania, then Communist Party of Albania (Albanian: Partia Komuniste e Shqipërisë). He also was the secretary of the Central Committee of the Communist Youth. He was the commander of one of the communist antifascist guerrilla cells in Tiranë.

He was involved in a series of guerrilla actions, such as that of burning a military weapon repository of Fascist Italy in Tirana, Albania. The fire lasted for 48 hours and damages of 5M Albanian francs were reported. Mame died, at 21, in one of Tiranë's neighborhoods, which still bears his name, while fiercely fighting, although outnumbered by Italian fascist soldiers.

One of the biggest woodworking plants in Albania, founded in the 1950s bears his name.

== Sources ==
- Vaso Boshnjaku Misto Mame N. Frashëri (1962), (Albanian)
