= Konstantinos Lagoumitzis =

Greek revolutionary (c. 1781 – 1851)

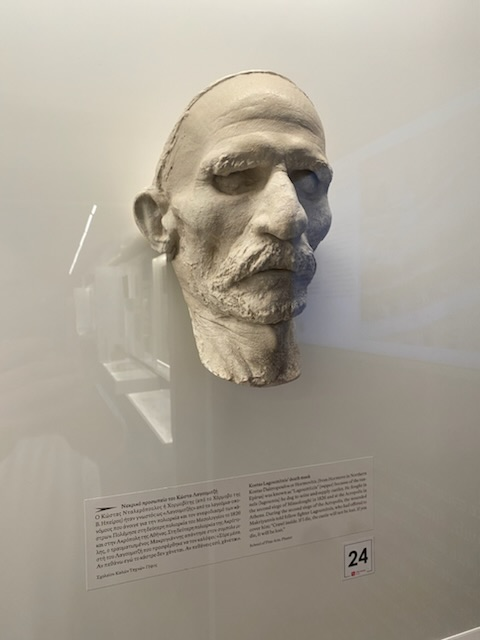
- The death mask of Konstantinos Lagoumitzis, National Historical Museum, Athens
- Native name: Κωνσταντίνος Λαγουμιτζής
- Born: c. 1781 Hormova, Ioannina Eyalet, Ottoman Empire (now Albania)
- Died: 1851 Athens, Kingdom of Greece
- Allegiance: (Greece) First Hellenic Republic
- Branch: Hellenic Army
- Conflicts: Greek War of Independence; Third Siege of Missolonghi; Second Siege of the Acropolis

Konstantinos Lagoumitzis (Greek: Κωνσταντίνος Λαγουμιτζής; c. 1781 – 1851) was a Greek revolutionary during the Greek War of Independence (1821–1830), famous for his ability to dig tunnels during sieges.

Lagoumitzis was born in the village of Hormovo, in modern Albania, then part of the Ottoman Empire; though, his family was originally from the village of Lekli. His real surname was either Papakyriakos (Παπακυριάκος) or Dalaropoulos (Νταλαρόπουλος), but he was also called Hormovitis (Χορμοβίτης; from Hormovo). He is mainly known as Lagoumitzis (sapper) due to his successful ability to dig tunnels (Greek: λαγούμια, romanized: lagoúmia) beneath the camps of enemies and blow them up.

His successes during the siege of Messolonghi and the siege of the Acropolis (1826–27), made him famous. During these sieges, Lagoumitzis successfully countermined the Turkish besiegers.

He died in Athens, in 1851; the Greek state paid for his funeral.
