= Vaia Papadimitriou =

Vaia Papadimitriou is a Senior Scientist at the Fermi National Accelerator Laboratory (Fermilab) and is the Deputy Project Manager of the Compact Muon Solenoid High-Luminosity Upgrade for the Large Hadron Collider.

== Education ==
Papadimitriou earned her Bachelor's degree from the Aristotle University of Thessaloniki in 1982. She went on to earn both a Master's (1985) and Ph.D. in particle physics (1990) from the University of Chicago. In 1990, Papadimitriou was awarded the first Leon M. Lederman Fellowship at Fermilab where she spent four years doing postdoctoral research.

== Career ==
Papadimitriou became a professor at Texas Tech University in 1994, spending the next eleven years there. Additionally, she has been a Senior Scientist as Fermilab since 2003. She is a part of the Deep Underground Neutrino Experiment, studying different aspects of neutrino oscillation. Her work centers on studies of quarkonium and bottom quark physics, where she studies fundamental particles and how they interact. Since 2018, she has been the Deputy Manager of the CMS High-Luminosity upgrade project for the LHC. In 2022, Papadimitriou was elected to the American Physical Society's (APS) Division of Particles and Fields Executive Committee. In 2024, she was elected as an APS Fellow in the Division of Particles and Fields for her leadership in international high energy programs.

== Selected publications ==
- Papadimitriou, Vaia; Gibbons, J. R. Patterson, Y. W. Wah, B. Winstein, R. Winston, M. Woods, and H. Yamamoto E. C. Swallow G. J. Bock, R. Coleman, Y. B. Hsiung, K. Stanfield, R. Stefanski, and T. Yamanaka G. D. Gollin, M. Karlsson, and J. K. Okamitsu P. Debu, B. Peyaud, R. Turlay, and B. Vallage, L. K.; Patterson, J. R.; Wah, Y. W.; Winstein, B.; Winston, R.; Woods, M.; Yamamoto, H. (1989-07-03). "Search for 𝐾_{𝐿}→π^{0} 𝛾𝛾". Physical Review Letters. 63 (28): 28–30. doi:10.1103/PhysRevLett.63.28. PMID 10040424.
- Anikeev, K.; et al. (2002-02-06). "B Physics at the Tevatron: Run II and Beyond". Fermilab-Pub. arXiv:hep-ph/0201071. Bibcode:2002hep.ph....1071A.
- Brambilla, N.; et al. (2005-07-26). "Heavy Quarkonium Physics". CERN Yellow Report. 2005–005. arXiv:hep-ph/0412158.
- Adams, C.; et al. (2014-04-22). "The Long-Baseline Neutrino Experiment: Exploring Fundamental Symmetries of the Universe". The LBNE Collaboration. arXiv:1307.7335.
- The CMS Collaboration (2020-05-09). "Constraints on the χ_{c1} versus χ_{c2} polarizations in proton-proton collisions at √s = 8 TeV". Physical Review Letters. 124 162002. arXiv:1912.07706. doi:10.1103/PhysRevLett.124.162002. hdl:10400.26/33947. PMID 32383915.
