= Anastas Byku =

Albanian publisher and journalist

- Born: 1830; Lekël, Ottoman Empire, now in modern Albania
- Died: 1878
- Occupation: Journalist
- Family: Byku

Anastas Byku was a 19th-century Albanian publisher and journalist. His publication of the Pelasgos newspaper in 1861 in both Albanian and Greek languages is considered to be one of the first publications of a periodical in Albanian. His endeavor was short-lived as the Greek authorities closed it down and persecuted him. He tried again in 1878 with another newspaper, Promytheus o Pelasgos, this time exclusively in the Greek language. His two newspapers are regarded as the first affirmation of the existence of an Albanian nation in the international public scene. Byku expressed contradictory ideas, as he called for both Christian Orthodox unity and Albanian unity regardless of religion. Byku held that the Greeks and the Albanians were descendants of the Pelasgians and the Illyrians, and were one single people, although they were of different religious faiths; still according to him both nations should be inseparable: this idea would eventually estrange him from the activists of the Albanian National Awakening.

== Life ==
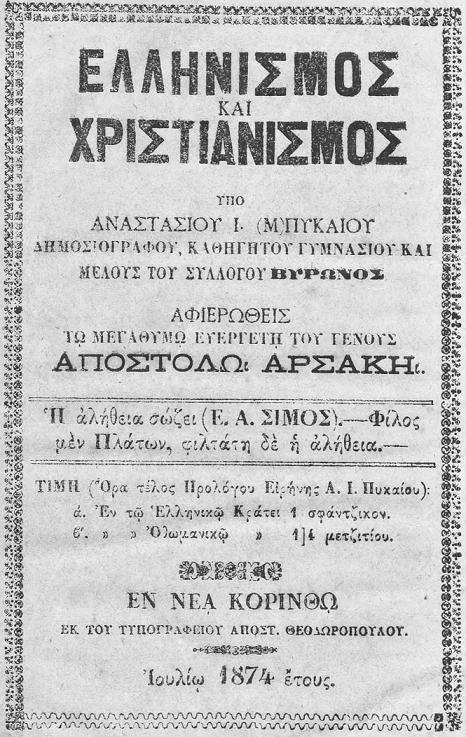
Cover of Ελληνισμός και Χριστιανισμός (Hellenism and Christianity), 1874

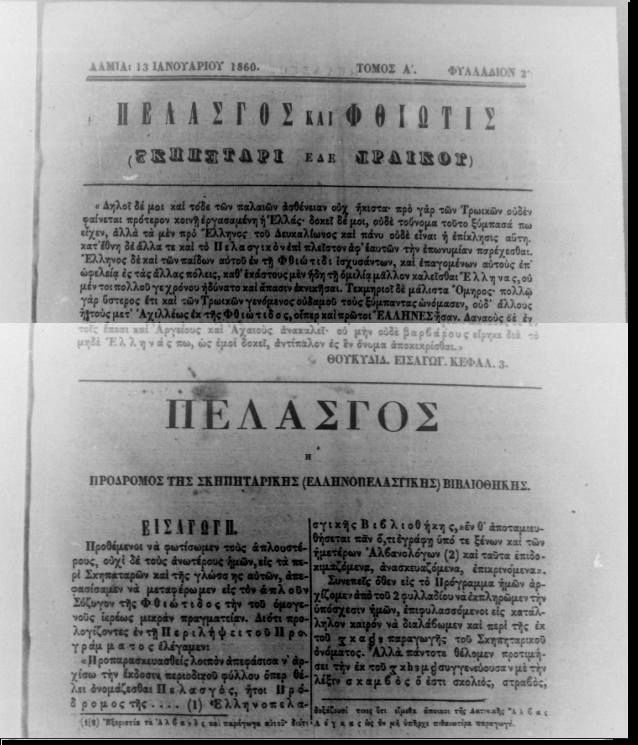
Front page of the newspaper "Pelasgos and Pthiotis", Jan. 1860, vol.1, leaf 2. Up: Thucydides, History A, 3. Low: Editorial introduction

Byku, signing his publications as Anastasios Pykaios (Greek: Αναστάσιος Πυκαίος), was born in Lekël, an Albanian village in the district of Tepelenë, then part of the Ottoman Empire but now in modern Albania. After finishing the Zosimea Greek language school in Ioannina, he started to work as a teacher in various Greek schools and as a journalist. In 1860–1861 in Lamia, Greece, where he was living at that time, he started to publish one of the first Albanian newspapers Πελασγος (English: The Pelasgian): the newspaper lasted only one year. There he called for the Albanian language to be written, but without proposing with which alphabet. He also supported the theories of Johann Georg von Hahn about a Pelasgian and Illyrian ancestry of the Albanians. The newspaper was closed down by the Greek authorities who persecuted him. The periodical was written in Albanian with an adapted Greek alphabet and in Greek. At the same time he published a primer textbook in Albanian called Gramë për shqipëtarët (English: Grammar for Albanians). In 1878, his last year of life, he tried to publish another newspaper, this time only in Greek, the Promytheus o Pelasgos (English: Prometheus the Pelasgian), but without much success. There Byku sought Greek attention to the struggle of Albanians against the potential fragmentation of their lands. His two newspapers are regarded as the first affirmation of the existence of an Albanian nation in the international public scene.

Byku expressed contradictory ideas, as he called for both Christian Orthodox unity and Albanian unity regardless of religion. Byku deemed that it was important that the Albanians closely lived in peace with the Greek nation and both nations should be inseparable. Moreover, he noted that the Albanians and the Greeks share the same ancient origins and have to deal with common enemies. Byku also asserted that the Albanian language is a dialect of the Greek language and that the Albanians are an ancient Greek tribe. For this his ideas were strongly rejected by a number of Albanian nationalists, such as Thimi Mitko, who saw the Albanian nation as completely separate from the Greek one. Byku in his work Ελληνισμός και Χριστιανισμός (Hellenism and Christianity) claimed that the three enemies of the Greek nation are: Western Europeans, Bulgarians and Muslims. He regarded the Albanians as natural allies of Hellenism, and was not concerned by the fact that many Albanians were Muslim. He was also unhappy with the way Greece treated the Albanian language.
