= Vaya con Dios =

Vaya con Dios (Spanish, meaning "Go with God") may refer to:

- "Vaya con Dios" (song), a song written by Larry Russell, Inez James, and Buddy Pepper
- Vaya Con Dios (band), a Belgian band
  - Vaya Con Dios (album), their debut album
- Vaya con Dios (film), a German comedy film starring Daniel Brühl
- Hard Time Romance or Vaya con Dios, an American romance film by John Lee Hancock
- "Vaya con Dios", an episode of Law & Order
- "Two (Vaya con Dios)", a song by Ill Niño, from the album Confession

== See also ==
- Vaya Con Tioz, an album by Böhse Onkelz
