= Vaya, Perm Krai =

Vaya Вая
- Settlement
- Location within Perm Krai Location within Russia
- Coordinates: 60°35′N 58°23′E
- Country: Russia
- Region: Perm Krai
- District: Krasnovishersky District
- Time zone: UTC+5:00

Vaya (Russian: Вая) is a rural locality (a settlement) and the administrative center of Vayskoye Rural Settlement, Krasnovishersky District, Perm Krai, Russia. The population was 393 as of 2010. There are 8 streets.

== Geography ==
Vaya is located 101 km northeast of Krasnovishersk (the district's administrative centre) by road. Ust-Uls is the nearest rural locality.
