= Saraqinisht =

- Village
- Location within Albania
- Coordinates: 40°6′19″N 20°13′16″E
- Country: Albania
- County: Gjirokastër
- Municipality: Gjirokastër
- Administrative unit: Antigonë
- Time zone: UTC+1 (CET)
  - Summer (DST): UTC+2 (CEST)

Saraqinisht is a small village of the former Antigonë municipality in the Gjirokastër County, southern Albania. At the 2015 local government reform it became part of the municipality Gjirokastër. Near the village are the remains of the ancient city of Antigonea, which was founded by Pyrrhus of Epirus, and named after his wife, Antigone. Saraqinisht is inhabited by an Orthodox Albanian population and an Aromanian minority.

At 1630-1653 the Aromanian inhabitants of the village were able to contribute to the foundation of several Orthodox monuments such as the churches of Saint Nicholas, Prophet Elija and the nearby monastery of Theotokos of Spilaio.
