= Zosimaia School =

Zosimaia School of Ioannina Ζωσιμαία Σχολή Ιωαννίνων
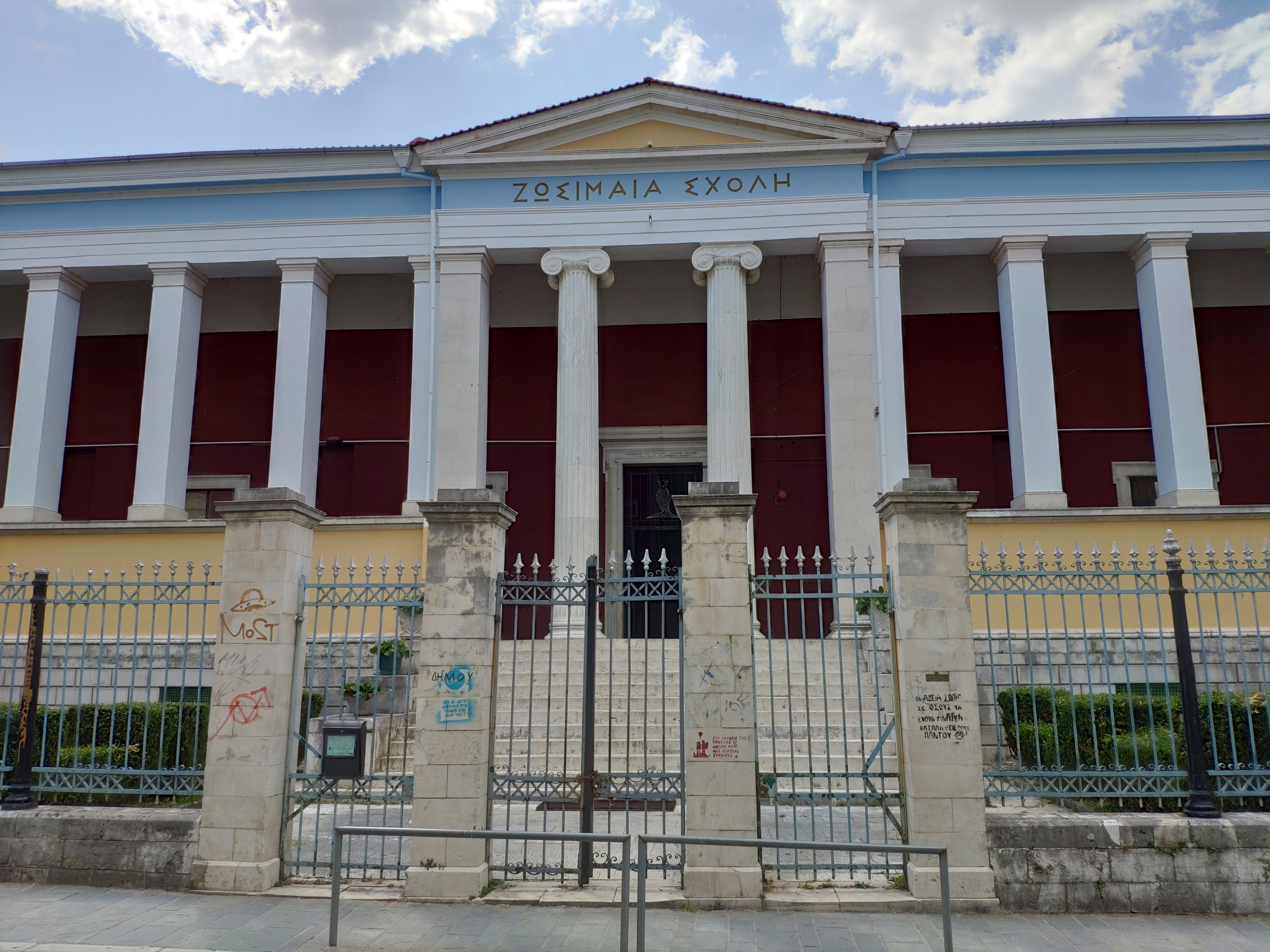

Location
- Ioannina; Greece
- Coordinates: 39.66942°N 20.851353°E

Information
- Type: Non-profit
- Established: 1828; 198 years ago
- School district: Ioannina regional unit
- Founders: Zosimades brothers

The Zosimaia School (Greek: Ζωσιμαία Σχολή, romanized: Zosimaía Scholí) is a Greek middle-level educational institution of Ioannina (in Epirus). It was significant during the last period of Ottoman rule in the region (1828–1913). The Zosimaia was founded at 1828 through the personal expense of the Zosimas brothers, and is still functioning as a high school under the regulations of the Greek Ministry of Education.

== Foundation ==
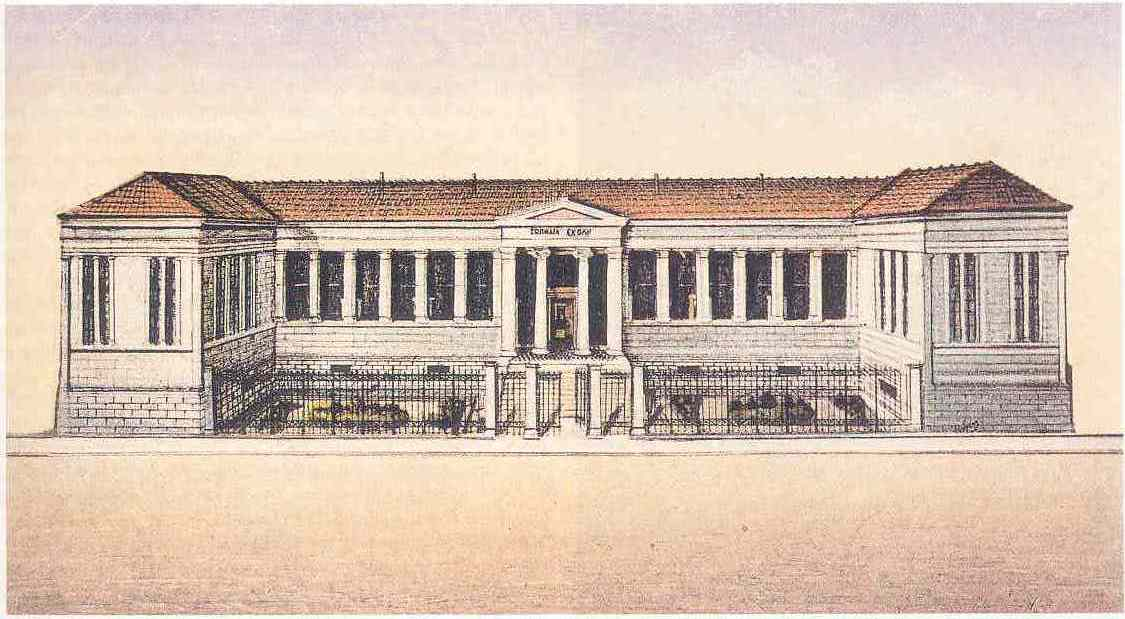
Old depiction of the building (completed in 1905)

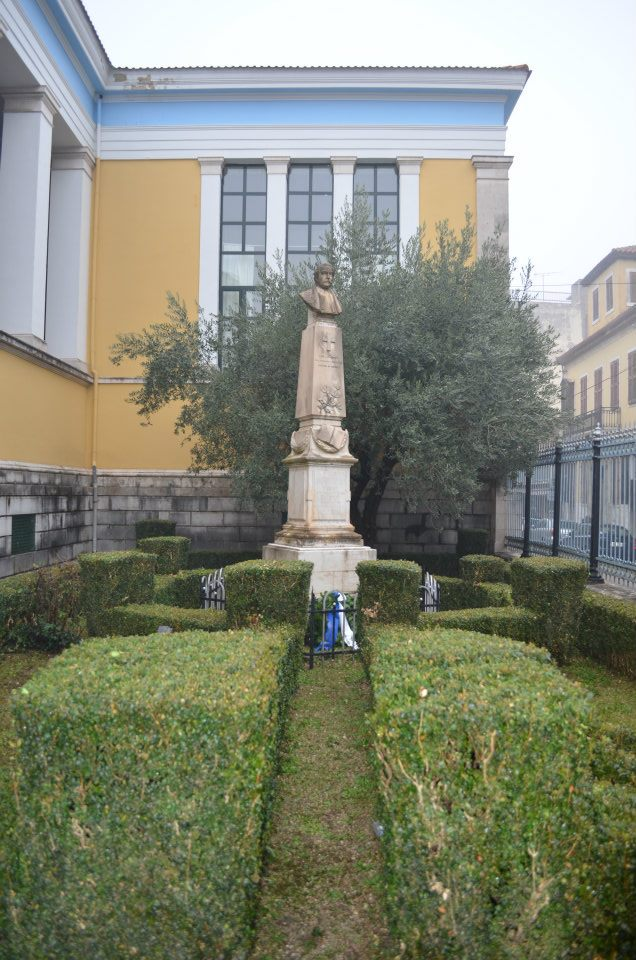
Bust of Nikolaos Zosimas

During the years of the Greek War of Independence (1821–1830) and while the conflicts was still raging in the region of Epirus, Ioannina, a city that was renowned for its cultural and educational background, and which had been a major center of the Greek Enlightenment, was falling into a short-term decay.

At this point, five Zosimas brothers who had migrated to Russia and become successful merchants, decided to make a significant contribution to their homeland, sponsoring the foundation of a new educational institution. The Zosimaia School was founded in 1828 and initially functioned as a four-class school. The Schools Committee of Ioannina, an organization responsible of the management of the city’s educational institution, had the full responsibility of the Zosimaia’s management, with the financial aid of the Zosimas family.

== Anastasios Sakellarios' administration, 1833-1862 ==
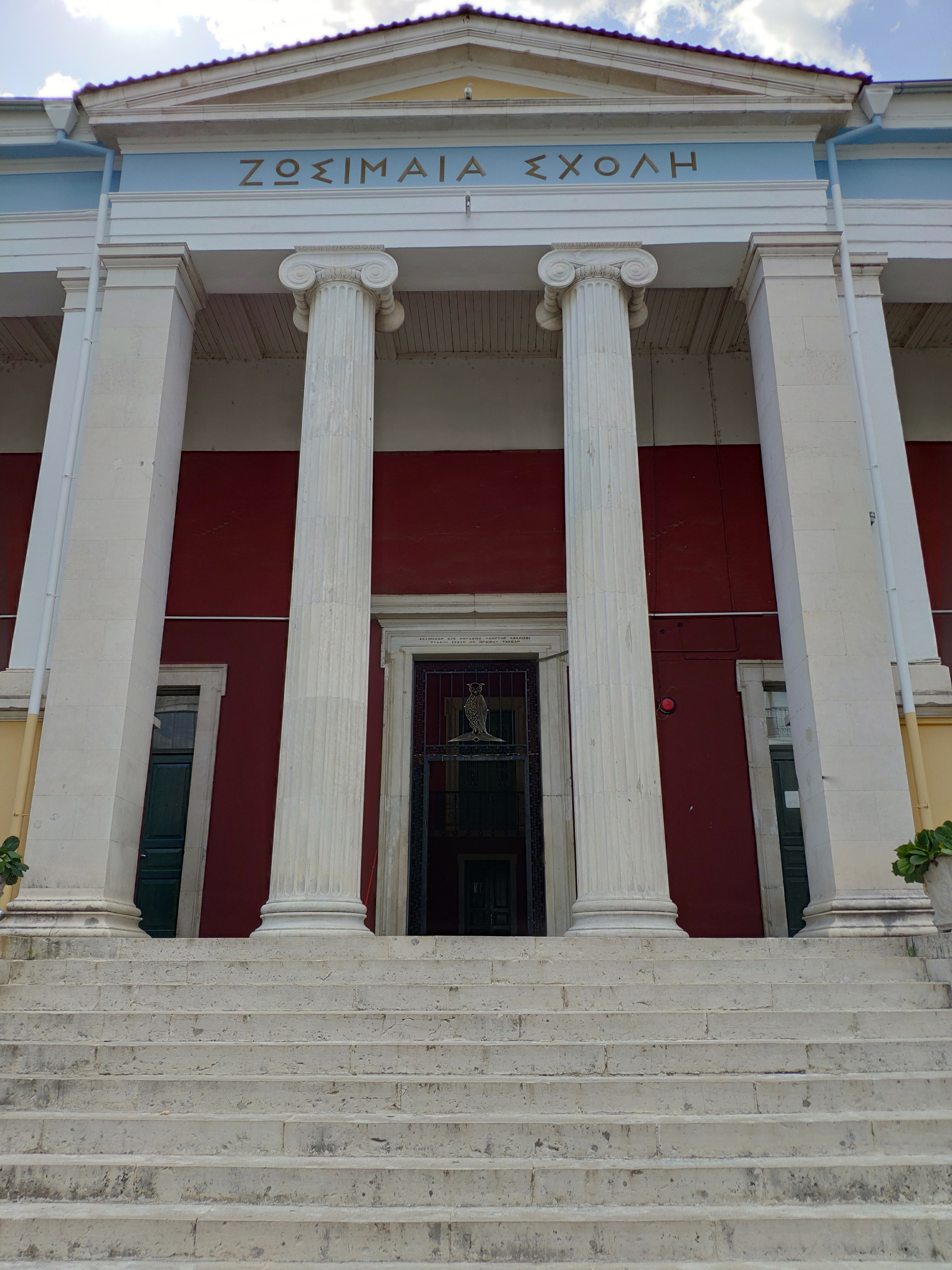
View of the main entrance

In 1833 Anastasios Sakellarios from Zagori, a former student of Athanasios Psalidas - a major intellectual of the Greek Enlightenment and Ali Pasha’s advisor - became director of the Zosimaia. In 1840 three more classes were added in the school’s educational program.

With Sakellarios’ administration, the Zosimaia became one of the most significant Greek-language schools of the Ottoman world. The majority of the students were from Epirus, but there were also many from Greek communities throughout the Ottoman Empire, e.g. from Eastern Rumelia. There were also transfers of students from other significant schools like the Phanar Greek Orthodox College (Greek: Μεγάλη του Γένους Σχολή) in Constantinople (mod. Istanbul). Additionally, a number of Turks and Albanians also attended Zosimaia, some of whom became leading personalities in their countries. The number of students reached 400 during the Sakellarios administration. Most of the graduates of Zosimaia either continued their studies, mostly in the University of Athens, or became teachers in one of the Greek schools in Balkan Peninsula. In 1860, due to the school's high prestige the school, the University of Athens allowed the entrance of Zosmaia graduates without any examinations. However, in 1862 Sakellarios resigned as a result of disagreements with other school officials of Ioannina.

== Final Ottoman period, 1862-1913 ==
Some of the school directors this period were:

- Spyridon Manaris (1863–1881), during his administration a fifth year of studies was added to the education program.
- Miltiadis Pantazis (1881–1888), from Monodhendri (Zagori)
- Spyridon Manaris (1881–1888), from Sidirokastro, also professor of University of Athens
- Georgios Soriritadis (1891–1893)
- Dimitrios Konstas (1891–1893)
- Antonis Travlantonis (1895–1896)

The teachers were highly educated, with significant contribution to the cultural and educational activity of that time, like, for instance, Panagiotis Aravantinos, who wrote a great number of books on folklore and linguistics.

== 1913 - present ==
The Zosimaia functions continuously to the present day as a high school offering high level education, under the regulations of the Greek ministry of education.

== Notable alumni ==
- Ali Asllani (1884–1966)
- Elmaz Boçe (1852–1925)
- Anastas Byku (?-1878)
- Abedin Dino (1843–1906)
- Hasan Dosti (1895–1991)
- Naim Frashëri (1846–1900)
- Sami Frashëri (1850–1904)
- Mehmet Esat (1862–1952)
- Georgios Hatzis (Pelleren) (1881–1930)
- Dimitrios Hatzis (1913–1981)
- Qazim Koculi (1887–1943)
- Kostandin Kristoforidhi (1826–1895)
- Kostas Krystallis (1868–1894)
- Qazim Mulleti (1893–1956)
- Sali Nivica (1890–1920)
- Karolos Papoulias (1929-2021)
- Hasan Tahsin Pasha (1845–1918)
- Ismail Kemal (1844–1919)
- Hodo Sokoli (1836–1883)
- Dhimitër Tutulani (1875–1937)
- Georgios Tzavelas (1866–1961)
- Christakis Zografos (1820–1896)

== Sources ==
- The Syllogos movement of Constantinople and Ottoman Greek education 1861-1923. George A Vassiadis. Centre for Asia Minor Studies, 2007 ISBN 960-87610-6-9.
- Yannina: A Journey to the Past. Eftihia Nachmias Nachman, Marcia Haddad Ikonomopoulos, Isaac Dostis. ISBN 0-8197-0765-1
- Epirus, 4000 Years of Greek History and Civilization. M. V. Sakellariou. Ekdotike Athenon, 1997. ISBN 960-213-371-6
