= Thanasis Vagias =

Greek counselor (1765–1834)

Thanasis Vagias (Greek: Θανάσης Βάγιας; Albanian: Thanas Vaja; 1765–1834) was a Greek governor in the newly founded Greek state, who had previously served as a counselor and confidant of Ali Pasha, the Muslim Albanian ruler of the Pashalik of Yanina.

== Biography ==
Thanasis Vagias was born in Lekël, Tepelenë. He was the older brother of Loukas Vagias. His name had become notorious because, under Ali's service, he led an attack against the village of Kardhiq, near Gjirokaster, modern southern Albania. As a result of this operation, hundreds of men, women and children were killed. When the Greek War of Independence ended, Vagias moved to the newly founded Greek state and was given a government post and later acquired a pension, by the head of state of Greece, Ioannis Kapodistrias.

As a native of Epirus, Vagias proposed to Kapodistrias that Epirus should become part of Greece, but his plan was not accepted due to the difficult conditions the Greek revolution faced that time.

== Legacy ==
According to various authors, Vagias was wrongly regarded as a traitor of the Greek cause by various historians and authors of that period, like Ioannis Makrygiannis, Aristotelis Valaoritis, and Alexandre Dumas, père. Valaoritis's masterpiece was titled Thanasis Vagias after him. In this work, Vagias is presented as a traitor, who after his death returns to his home place as a vampire. Additionally, one of the main characters of the Greek traditional shadow theatre, Karagiozis, is named Thanasis Vagias, who is a servant of Ali Pasha and is portrayed as a cowardly warrior.

== See also ==
- Loukas Vagias
- Greek War of Independence
- Pashalik of Yanina
