= Antigonia (Chaonia) =

Ancient town in Albania

Coordinates: 40.0887°N 20.2221°E

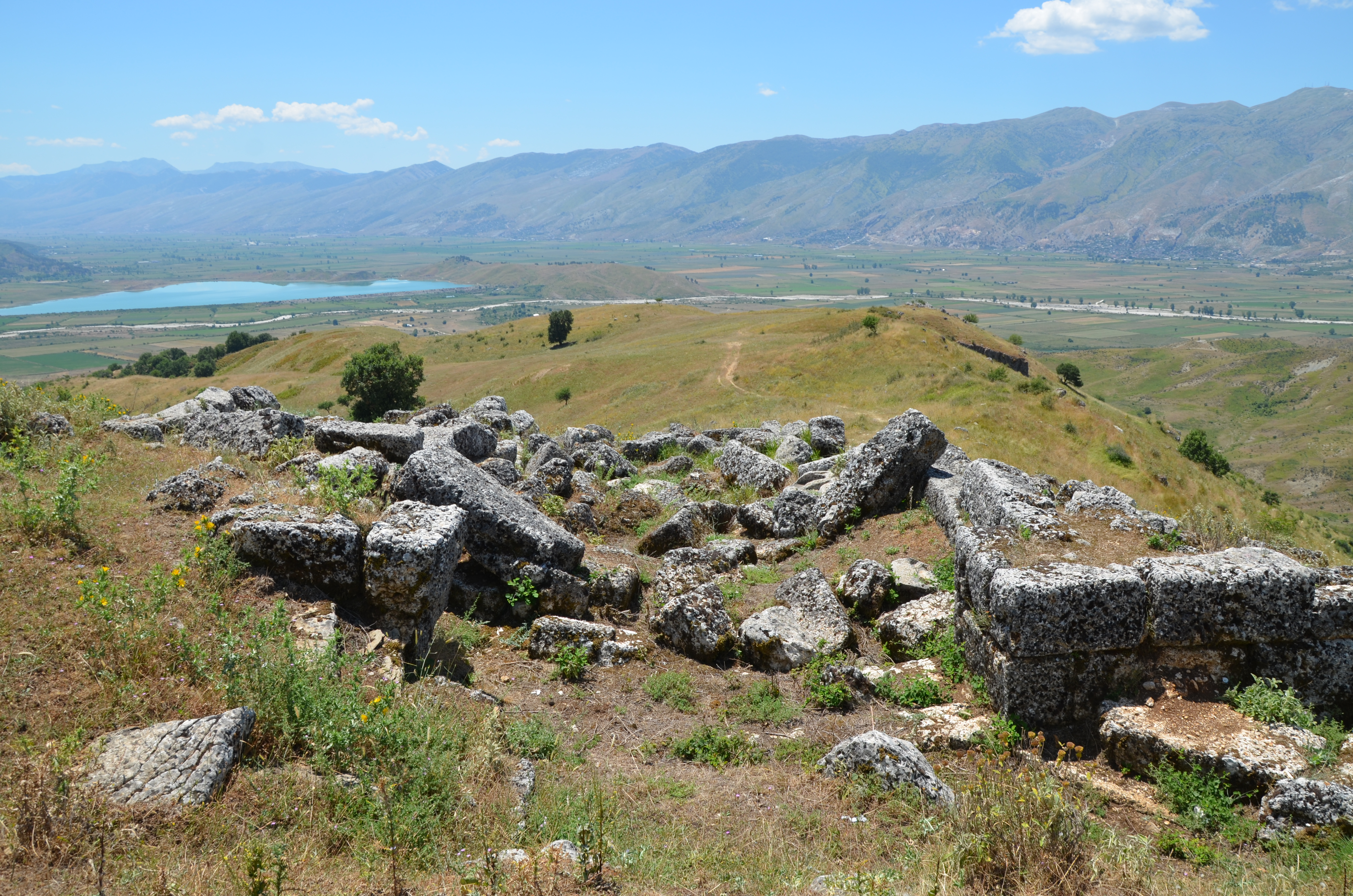
View over Drino valley

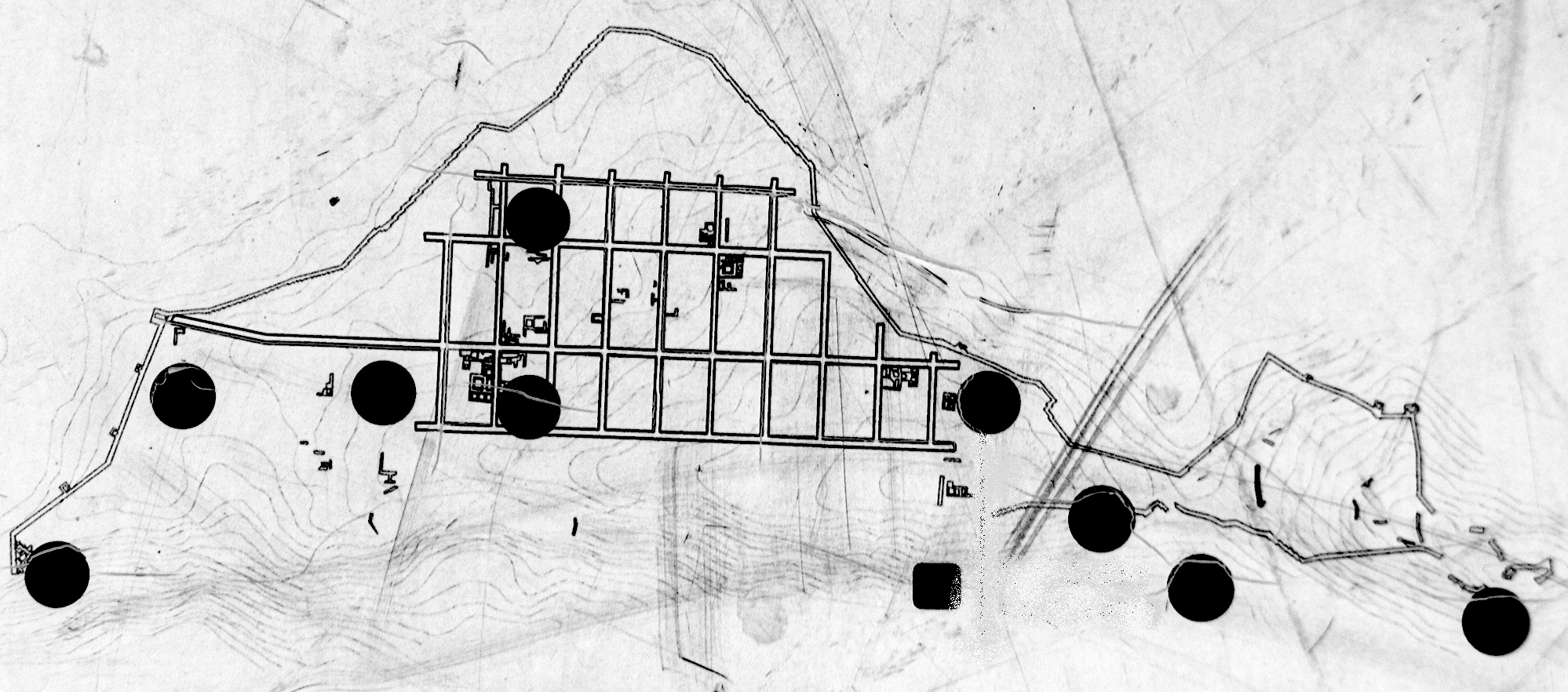
Antigonia plan

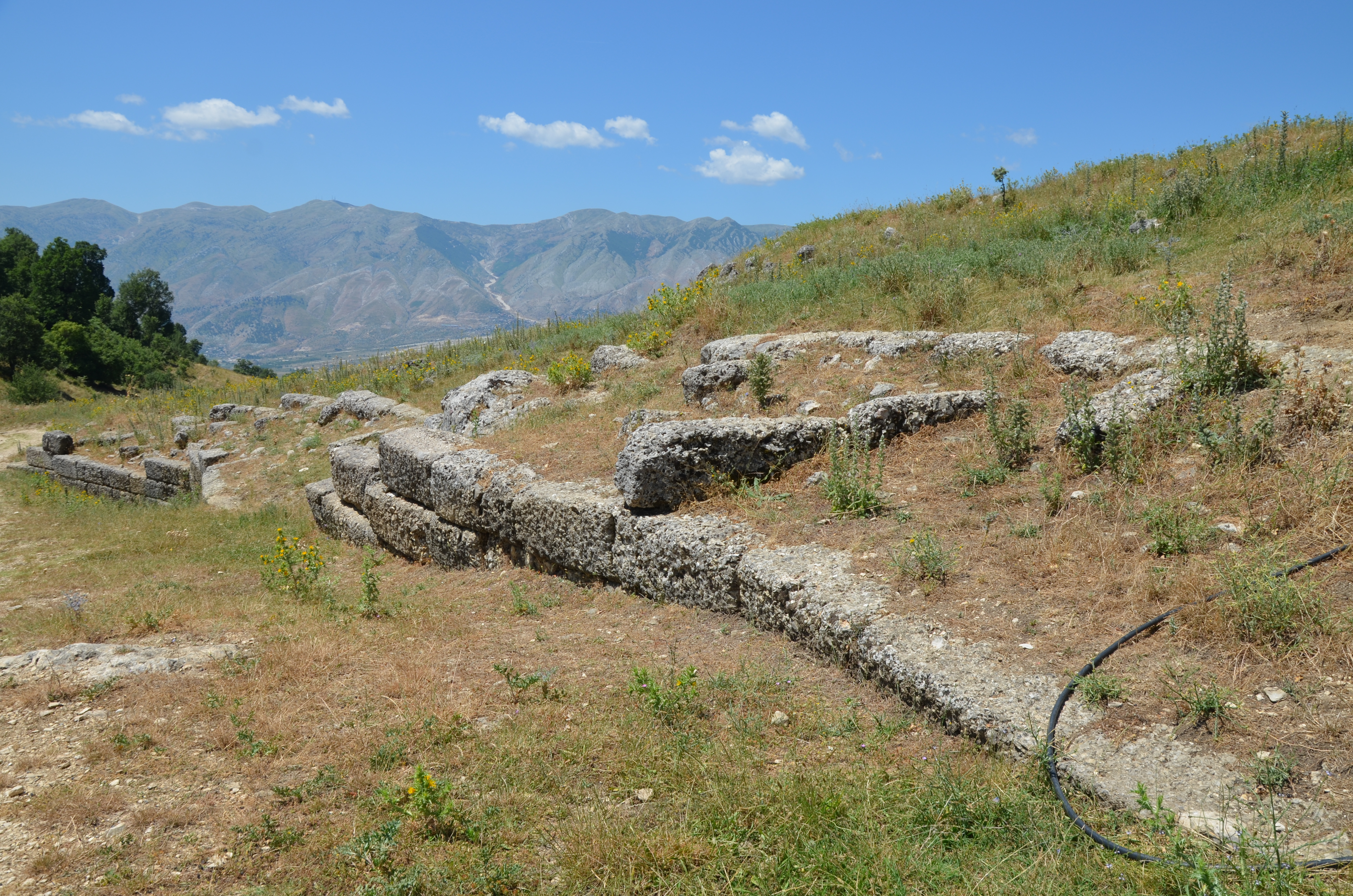
City walls

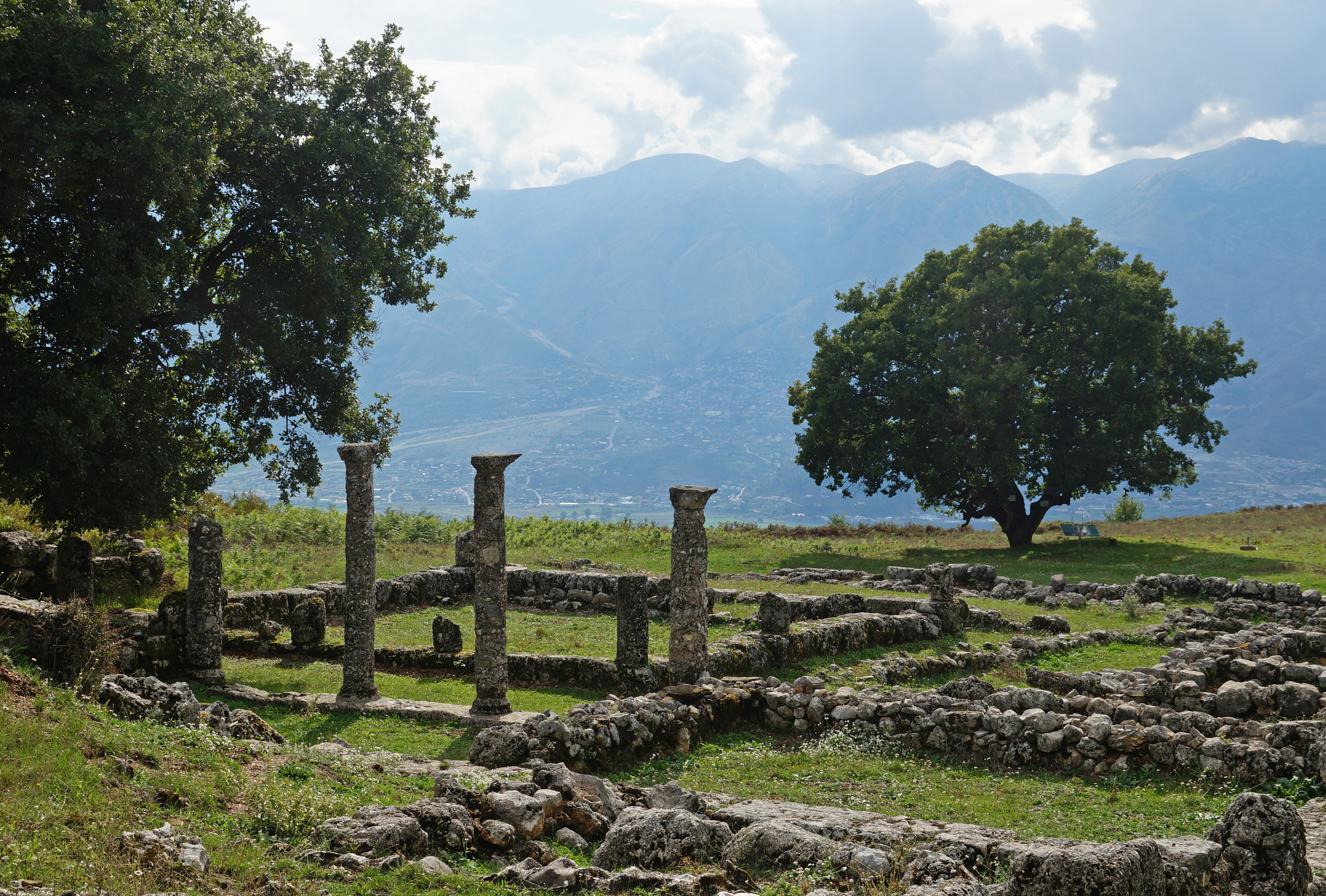
Ruins of Epirote house with peristyle

Antigonia (Ancient Greek: Ἀντιγόνεια), also transliterated as Antigonea and Antigoneia, was an ancient Greek city in Chaonia, Epirus, and the chief inland city of the ancient Chaonians. It is located just south of the village of Saraqinisht, Gjirokastër County, Albania.

The area has been declared a National Archaeological Park.

== The site ==
Antigoneia was built on a strategic location at 600 metres above sea level on an almost impregnable hill overlooking the settlements in the Drino valley from where it could control access through the mountains and to the sea.

== History ==
It was founded in the 3rd century BC, maybe by Antigonus II Gonatas, but more probably by Pyrrhus of Epirus. In the latter case, Pyrrhus would have named the city after one of his wives, Antigone, daughter of Berenice I and step-daughter of Ptolemy I of Egypt.

The straits near Antigonia were mentioned in 230 BC, when a force of Illyrians under Scerdilaidas passed the city to join an invading army further south.

In 198 BC, during the Second Macedonian War, the Romans marched against the Macedonian armies of Philip V. His general, Athenagoras, was able to occupy one of the nearby passes, leading to the Romans being held back. Initially the Romans were going to negotiate peace, however, several treasonous shepherds led the Romans to be able to surround and destroy the Macedonian army of 2000 men.

Antigonia had sided with the Macedonians, and so when the Romans were victorious over the Macedonians in 167 BC, Consul Aemilius Paullus ordered 70 towns in Epirus to be set on fire, including Antigonia, which was never rebuilt. Antigonia is mentioned by the ancient authors Polybius, Livy, Pliny the Elder, and Ptolemy.

A newly discovered church, on the floor of which there is a mosaic of Saint Christopher and a Greek emblem, testifies to the city's existence in the palaeo-Christian period. However it seemed to be the last building constructed in ancient Antigonia; the church was destroyed during Slavic assaults in the 6th century AD.

Finds such as a bronze sphinx and a statue of Poseidon are exhibited in Tirana. There has also been evidence of pottery found across the city, attesting to its size at its peak.

The ancient town was identified and excavated by the Albanian archaeologist Dhimosten Budina. More recently, an Albanian-Greek team of archaeologists has been working on the site.

== Description ==
The most impressive feature of the city are its walls, demolished by the Romans, which completely encircled the hill. The most visible gate in the walls is at the south-western portion of the city. The southern end of the city has the most well preserved portion of the city walls. The wall section terminates at the small early Christian church of triconch form, whose mosaic floor is decorated with a depiction of a strange illustration of a human with an animal head, resembling the Egyptian god Anubis or Saint Christopher.

On the central hill the city centre was built on an orthogonal (Hippodamian) plan where an entire ancient street is exposed. The acropolis is on the northern hill.

== See also ==
- List of cities in ancient Epirus
- Tourism in Albania
