= Gjirokastër =

City in Albania

Gjirokastër Ergjëri Αργυρόκαστρο Ljurocastru
- Municipality
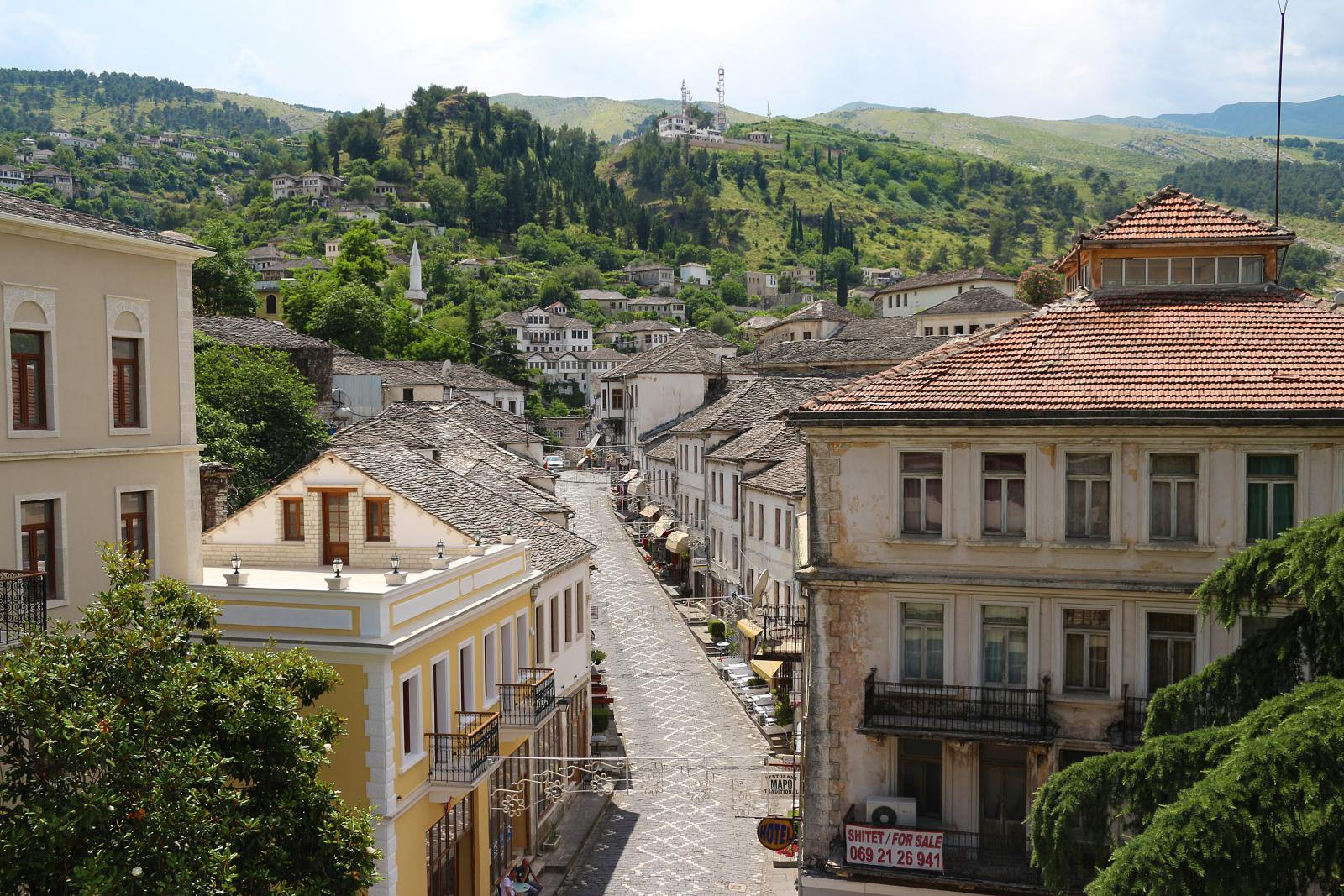
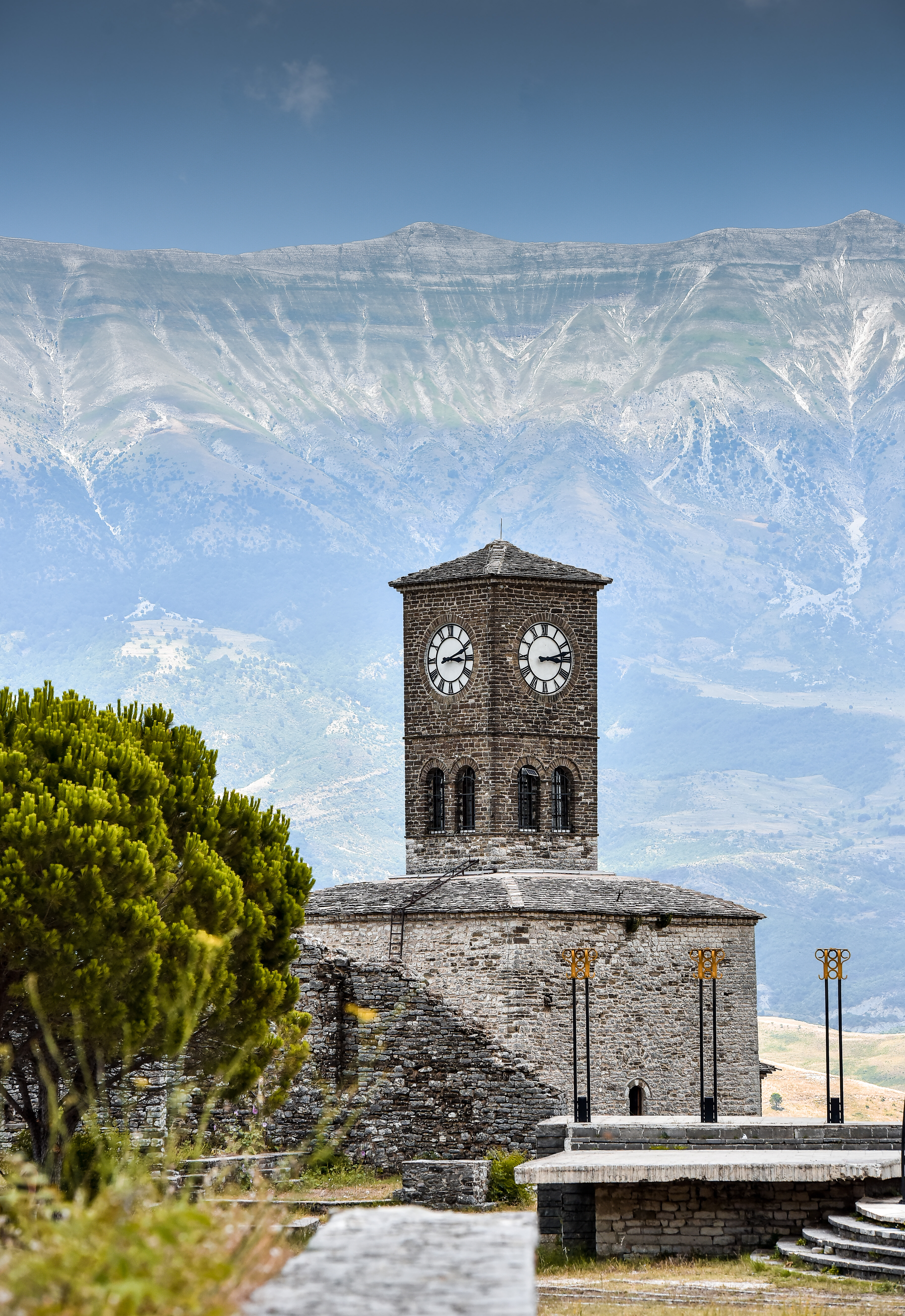
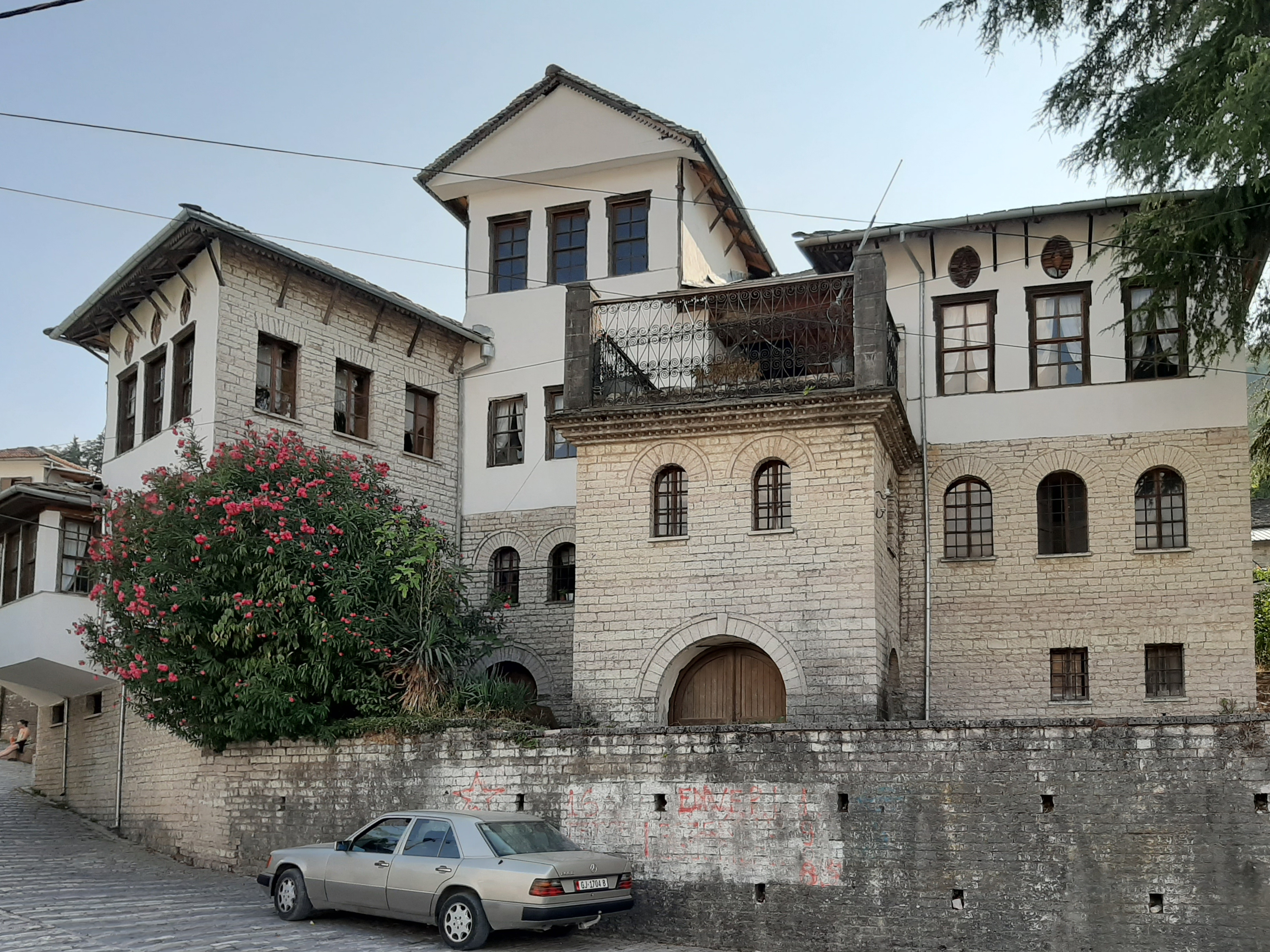
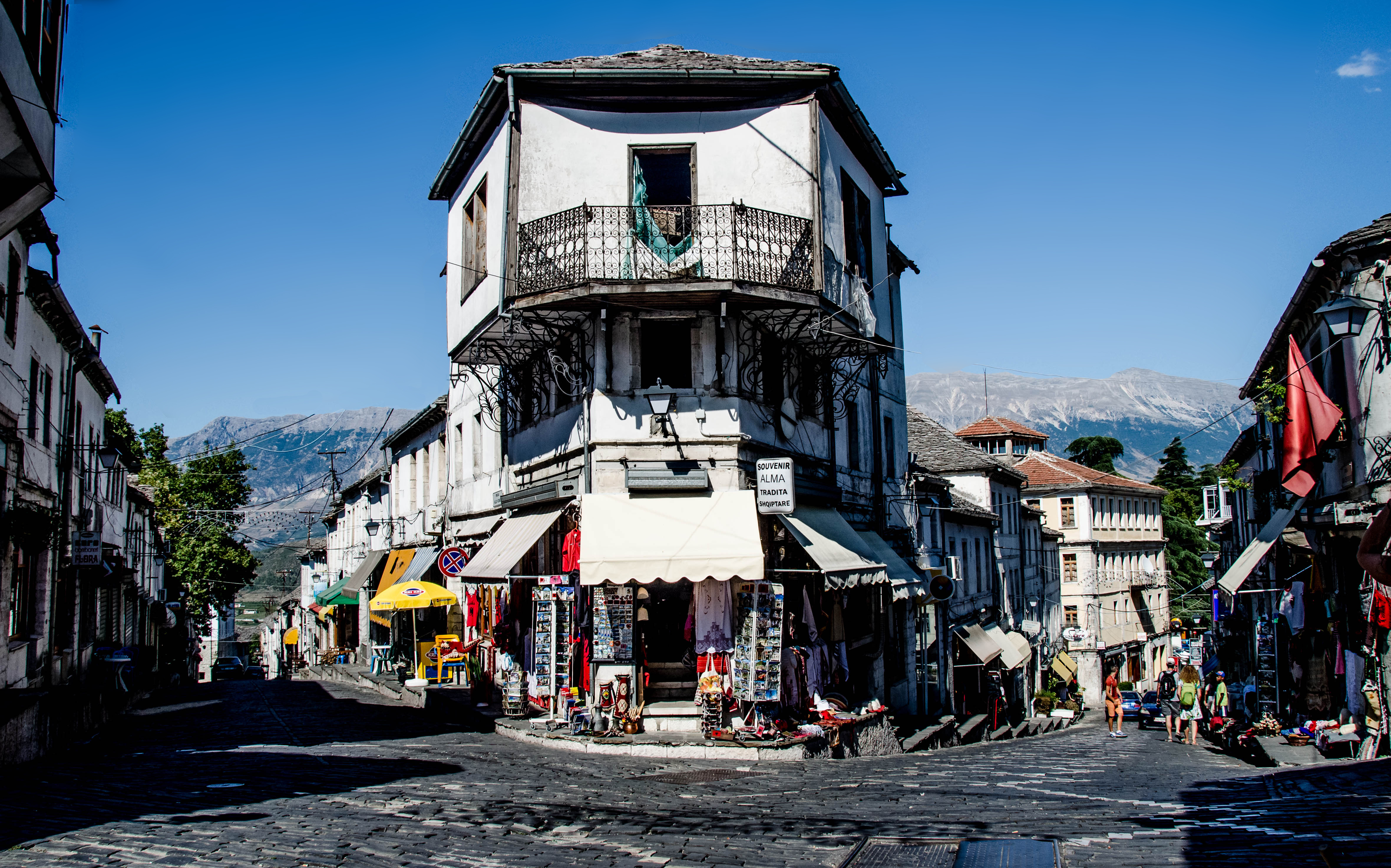
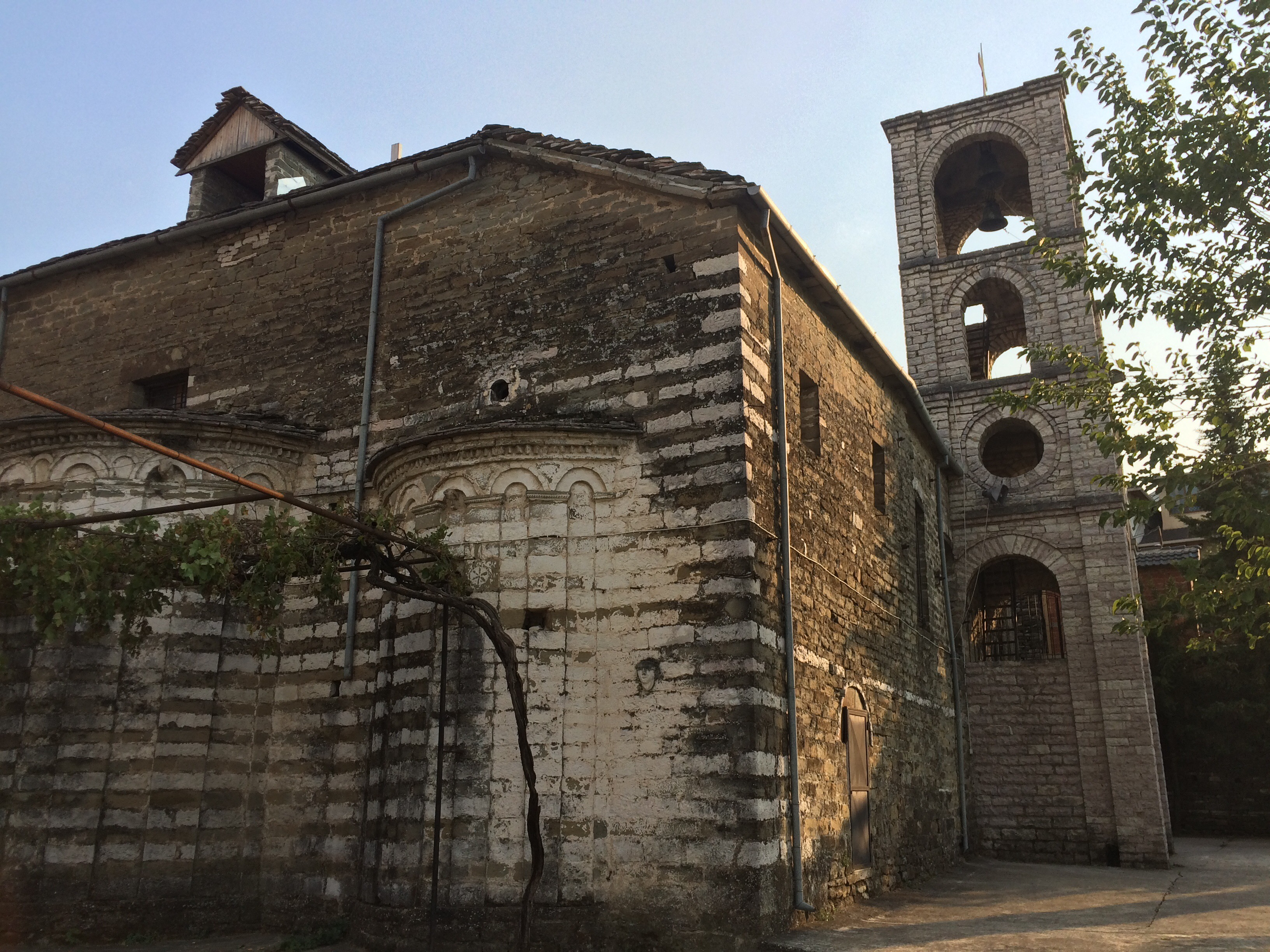
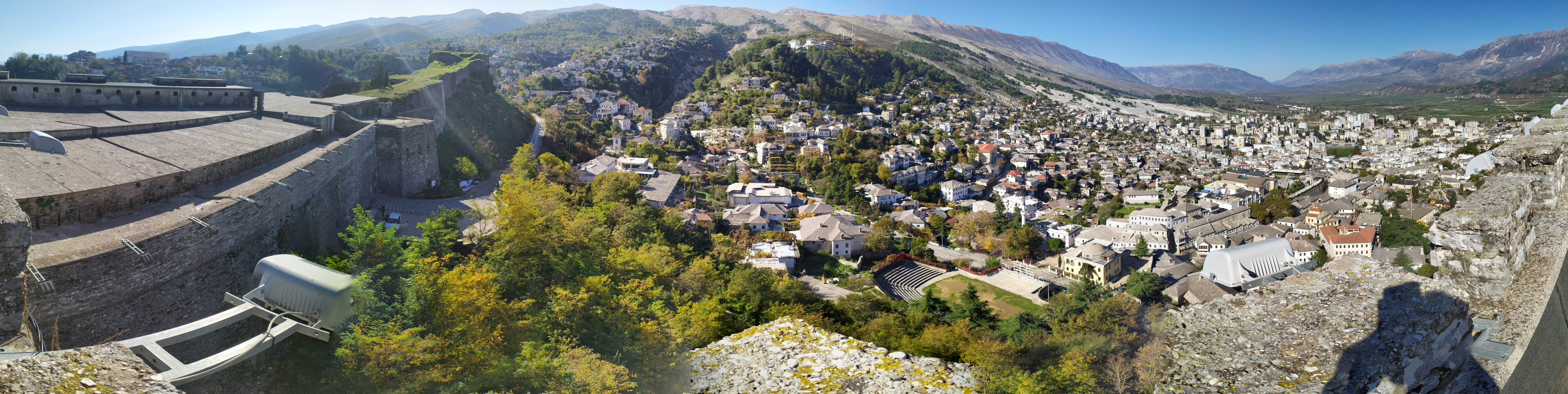
- View over Gjirokastër Clock tower Ethnographic Museum Old Bazaar St. Sotir Church Panorama of Gjirokastër

- Emblem
- Nickname(s): City of Stone, Hoxhagrad
- Location within Albania
- Coordinates: 40°04′N 20°08′E
- Country: Albania
- County: Gjirokastër

Government
  - Mayor: Flamur Golëmi (PS)

Area
  - Municipality: 473.8 km^{2} (182.9 sq mi)
  - Administrative unit: 36.35 km^{2} (14.03 sq mi)
- Elevation: 340 m (1,120 ft)

Population (2023)
  - Municipality: 23,270
  - Municipality density: 49.11/km^{2} (127.2/sq mi)
  - Administrative unit: 16,569
  - Administrative unit density: 455.8/km^{2} (1,181/sq mi)
- Demonym(s): Albanian: Gjirokastrit (m), Gjirokastrite (f)
- Time zone: UTC+1 (CET)
  - Summer (DST): UTC+2 (CEST)
- Postal Code: 6001–6003
- Area Code: 084
- Website: bashkiagjirokaster.gov.al

UNESCO World Heritage Site
- Official name: The Historic Centres of Berat and Gjirokastra
- Type: Cultural
- Criteria: iii, iv
- Designated: 2005
- Reference no.: 569
- Region: Gjirokastër County
- Europe: 2005–present

Gjirokastër (Albanian: [ɟiɾoˈkastəɾ, -tɾa], Albanian definite form: Gjirokastra) is a city in southern Albania and the seat of Gjirokastër County and Gjirokastër Municipality. It is located in a valley between the Gjerë mountains and the Drino, at 300 metres above sea level. Its old town is a UNESCO World Heritage Site. The city is overlooked by Gjirokastër Fortress, where the Gjirokastër National Folk Festival is held every five years. It is the birthplace of former Albanian communist leader Enver Hoxha, and author Ismail Kadare.

The city appears in the historical record dating back in 1336 by its medieval Greek name, Αργυρόκαστρο, Argyrókastro, as part of the Byzantine Empire. It first developed in the hill where the Gjirokastër Fortress is located. In this period, Gjirokastër was contested between the Despotate of Epirus and the Albanian clan of Zenebishi under Gjon Zenebishi who made it his capital in 1417. It was taken by the Ottomans in 1418, a year after's Gjon's death, and it became the seat of the Sanjak of Albania. Throughout the Ottoman era, Gjirokastër was officially known in Ottoman Turkish as Ergiri and also Ergiri Kasrı. During the Ottoman period conversions to Islam and an influx of Muslim converts from the surrounding countryside made Gjirokastër go from being an overwhelmingly Christian city in the 16th century into one with a large Muslim population by the early 19th century. Gjirokastër also became a major religious centre for Bektashi Sufism.

Taken by the Hellenic Army during the Balkan Wars of 1912–1913, Gjirokastër was eventually incorporated into the newly independent state of Albania in 1913. The local Greek population rebelled and established the short-lived Autonomous Republic of Northern Epirus in 1914 with Gjirokastër as its capital. During the communist period, Gjirokastër was designated a "museum city" due to its architectural heritage. In more recent years, the city witnessed anti-government protests that led to the 1997 Albanian civil unrest. Besides Albanians, who constitute the majority, the city is also home to a substantial Greek minority, and some Aromanians, Romani and Balkan Egyptians. The city is a centre for the Greek minority in Albania.

== Names and etymology ==
The city appeared for the first time in historical records under its medieval name of Argyrókastron (Medieval Greek: Αργυρόκαστρον), as mentioned by John VI Kantakouzenos in 1336. The name comes from argyrón (Medieval Greek: ἀργυρόν, lit. 'silver'), and kástron (Medieval Greek: κάστρον), derived from Latin castrum, meaning "castle" or "fortress"; thus "silver castle". Byzantine chronicles also used the similar name Argyropolýchni (Medieval Greek: Αργυροπολύχνη, lit. 'silver town'). The theory that the city took the name of the Princess Argjiro, a legendary figure about whom 19th-century author Kostas Krystallis and Ismail Kadare wrote novels, is considered folk etymology, since the princess is said to have lived later, in the 15th century.

The definite Albanian form of the name of city is Gjirokastra, while in the Gheg Albanian dialect it is known as Gjinokastër, both of which derive from the Greek name. During the Ottoman era, the town was known in Turkish as Ergiri.

== History ==
=== Early history ===
The Phrygian period of the region spanned from around 1150 BCE to around 850 BCE. Nicholas Hammond argues that the region was checkered with a mosaic of small Phrygian principalities, with the principality of Gjirokastër and the surrounding region having its center at Vodhinë. In the later part of the period, it appears there was a change of dynasty at Vodhine.

Archaeologists have found pottery artifacts dating to the early Iron Age, crafted in a style that first appeared in the late Bronze Age in Pazhok, Elbasan County, and is found throughout Albania. The earliest recorded inhabitants of the area around Gjirokastër were the ancient Greek tribe of the Chaonians, which belonged to the Epirote group. In antiquity the local urban centre was located in Antigonia, c. 5 kilometres (3 mi) from modern Gjirokastër on the opposite bank of river Drino.

=== Medieval period ===
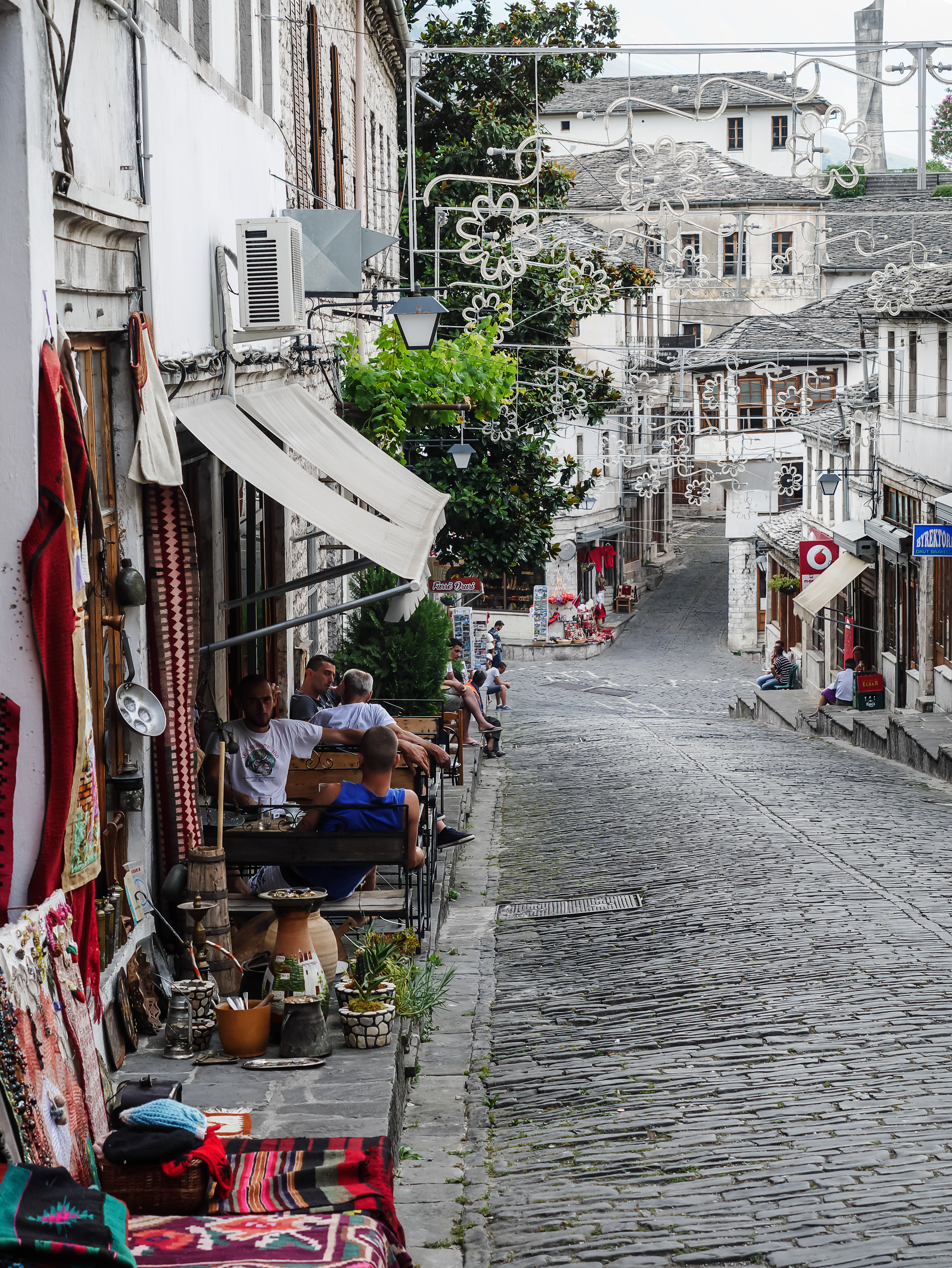
Ottoman architecture characterizes the historical city center.

Gjirokastër first developed on the hill where the castle of the city is located in the Middle Ages. The first fortification dates to the 5th-6th centuries CE during the period of Slavic migrations to the Balkans. It was expanded in the 9th-10th centuries, while the first signs of actual settlement medieval urban development in the castle area date to the 13th-14th centuries. During this period, Gjirokastër developed into a center known in medieval sources as Argyropolis (Medieval Greek: Ἀργυρόπολις, meaning "Silver City") or Argyrokastron (Medieval Greek: Ἀργυρόκαστρον, meaning "Silver Castle"). The city was part of the Despotate of Epirus and was first mentioned by the name Argyrokastro by John VI Kantakouzenos in 1336. That year Argyrokastro was among the cities that remained loyal to the Byzantine Emperor during a local Epirote rebellion in favour to Nikephoros II Orsini.

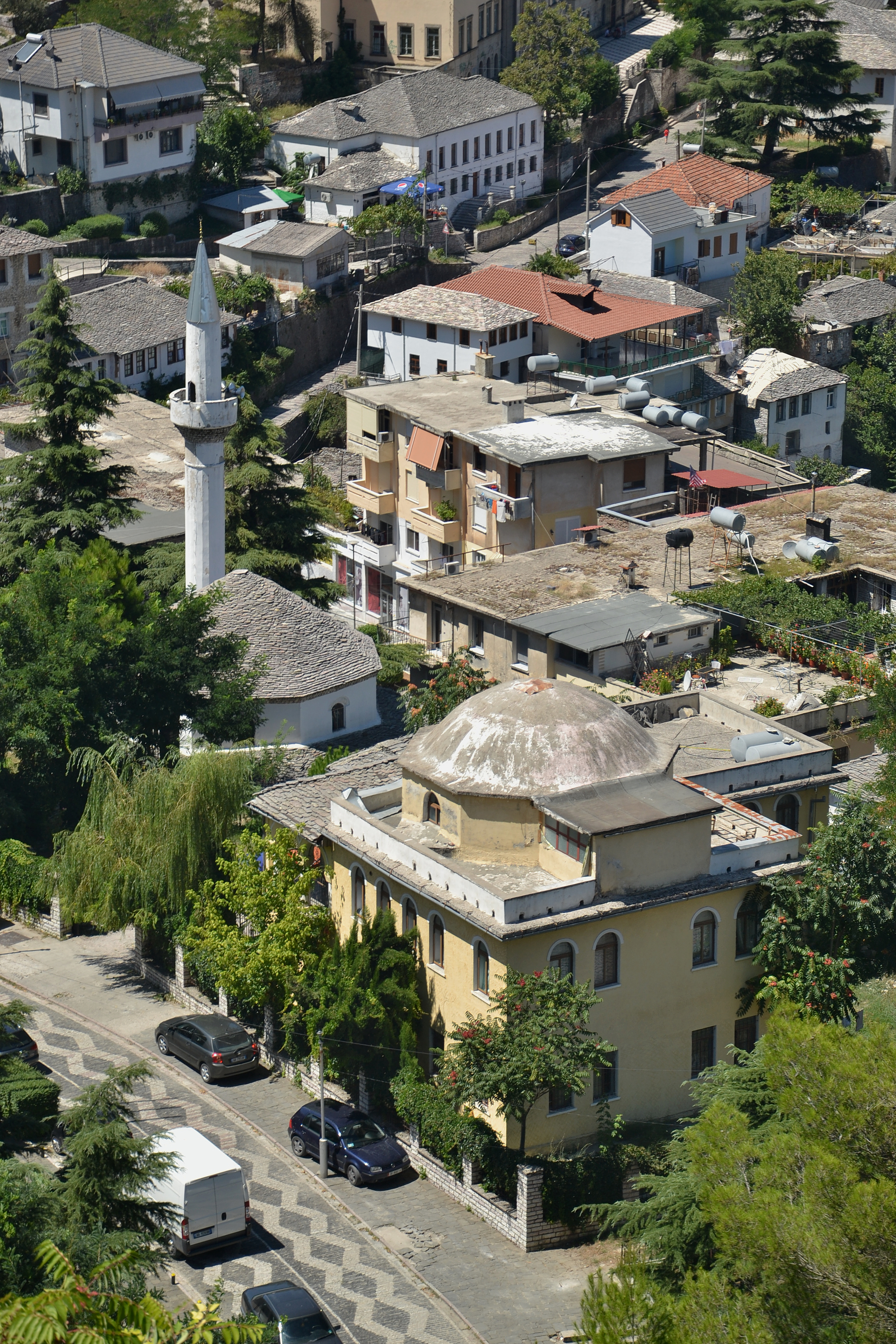
Teqe Mosque

The Albanian Zenebishi clan, which held Gjirokastër by the end of the century, is first mentioned in 1304 as land holders in the Angevin holdings in Albania, possibly in the southern coastal area. Laonikos Chalkokondyles mentions that in the era before 1336, Albanian clans from the area of Durrës marched southwards and took control of most areas in Gjirokastër. In this era, the city was contested between the Italian and Serbian rulers which claimed the Despotate of Epirus with occasional Ottoman support and the Zenebishi clan under Gjon Zenebishi. In 1399, the Italian ruler of Ioannina, Esau de' Buondelmonti who was allied to the Ottomans, gathered an army made up of troops from Ioannina, Zagori, Dryinoupolis and Gjirokastër and the Mazaraki and Malakasi clans and marched against Gjon Zenebishi. He was ambushed, defeated and captured along with other lords from Ioannina by Zenebishi near Dhivër. The victory secured the city of Gjirokastër for Gjon Zenebishi and it became his capital. In 1417 Gjon Zenebishi died and was succeeded by his son Simon as lord of Gjirokastër in early 1418. Immediately, the Ottomans besieged the city. Simon left the city during the siege to seek refuge in Ioannina and returned when the Ottoman siege failed, but nevertheless he eventually surrendered Gjirokastër to the Ottomans. With the acquisition of Gjirokastër, the area became known as Zenebish-ili (land of Zenebishi) and by 1419 became the seat of the Sanjak of Albania.

During the Albanian Revolt of 1432–36 it was besieged by forces under Depë Zenebishi, but the rebels were defeated by Ottoman troops led by Turahan Bey. In 1570s local nobles Manthos Papagiannis and Panos Kestolikos, discussed as Greek representative of enslaved Greece and Albania with the head of the Holy League, John of Austria and various other European rulers, the possibility of an anti-Ottoman armed struggle, but this initiative was fruitless.

=== Ottoman period (up to 1800) ===
According to Ottoman traveller Evliya Çelebi, who visited the city in 1670, at that time there were 200 houses within the castle, 200 in the Christian eastern neighborhood of Kyçyk Varosh (meaning small neighborhood outside the castle), 150 houses in the Byjyk Varosh (meaning big neighborhood outside the castle), and six additional neighborhoods: Palorto, Vutosh, Dunavat, Manalat, Haxhi Bey, and Memi Bey, extending on eight hills around the castle. According to the traveller, the city had at that time around 2000 houses, eight mosques, three churches, 280 shops, five fountains, and five inns. From the 16th century until the early 19th century Gjirokastër went from being a predominantly Christian city to one with a Muslim majority due to much of the urban population converting to Islam alongside an influx of Muslim converts from the surrounding countryside.

=== Modern ===
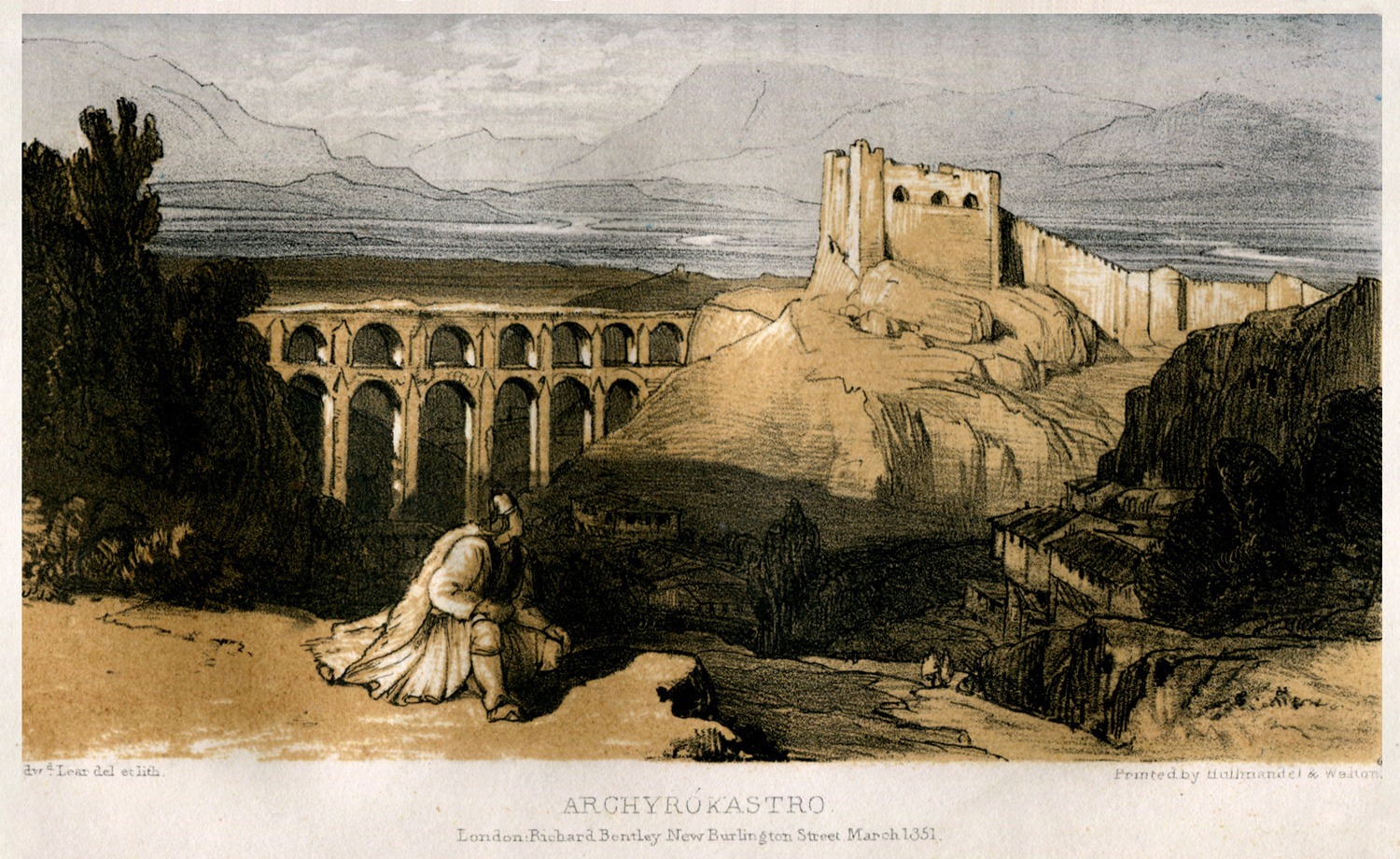
View of the fortress and aqueduct of Gjirokastër depicted by Edward Lear, 4 November 1848

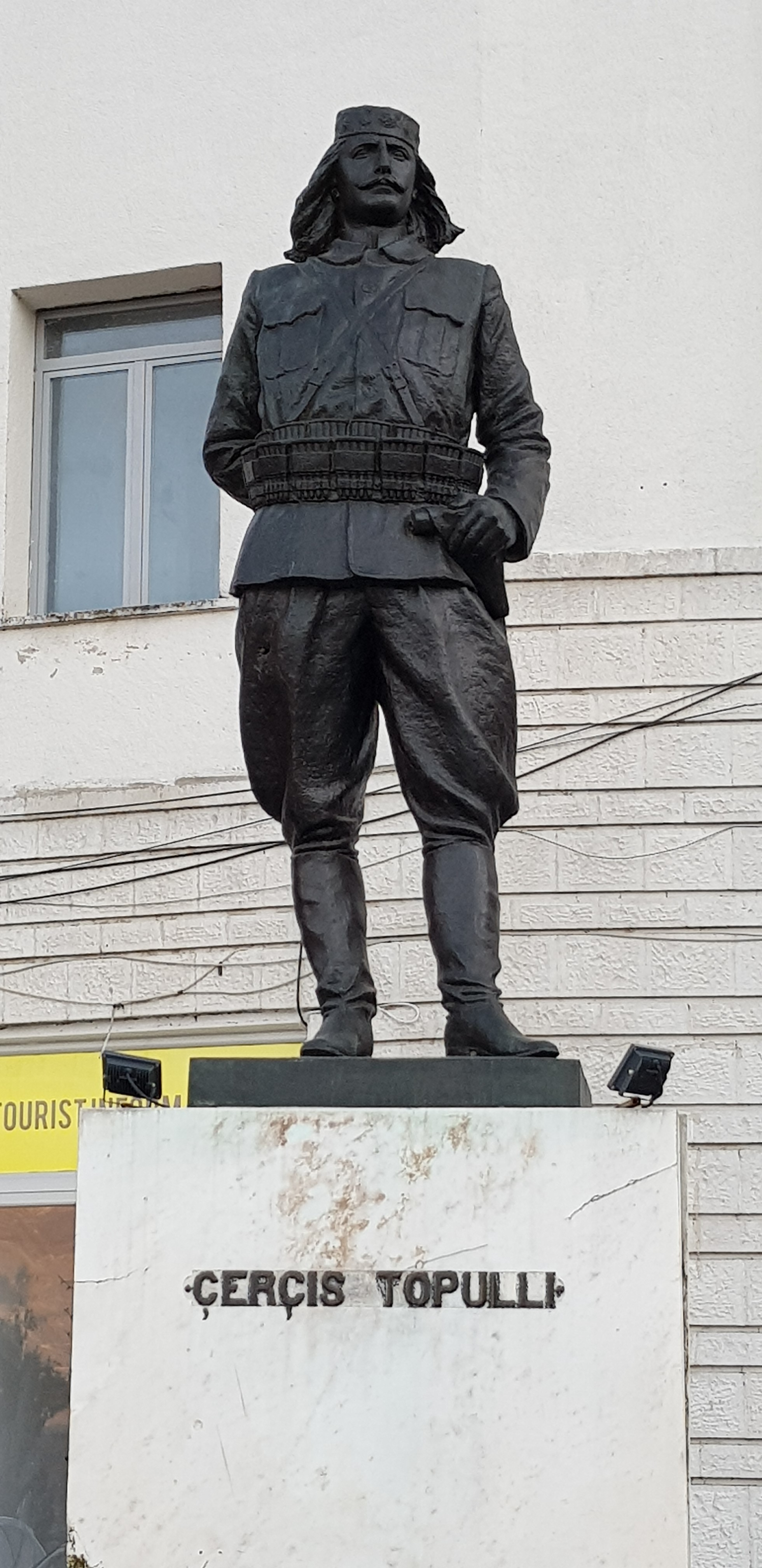
Statue of Çerçiz Topulli in Gjirokastër

In 1811, Gjirokastër became part of the Pashalik of Yanina, then led by the Albanian-born Ali Pasha of Ioannina and was transformed into a semi-autonomous fiefdom in the southwestern Balkans until his death in 1822. In 1833 Albanian rebels took over the town causing the Ottoman government to comply with rebel terms. After the fall of the pashalik in 1868, the city was the capital of the sanjak of Ergiri. On 23 July 1880, southern Albanian committees of the League of Prizren held a congress in the city, in which was decided that if Albanian-populated areas of the Ottoman Empire were ceded to neighbouring countries, they would revolt. During the Albanian National Awakening (1831–1912), the city was a major centre of the movement, and some groups in the city were reported to carry portraits of Skanderbeg, the national hero of the Albanians during this period. Gjirokastër from the middle of the nineteenth century also prominently contributed to the wider Ottoman Empire through individuals that served as Kadıs (civil servants) and was an important centre of Islamic culture. In early March 1908, the binbashi of Gjirokastër was assassinated by Çerçiz Topulli and his followers. The Albanians of the city during 1909–1912 were split between two groups: the urban liberals who wanted to cooperate with the Greeks and Albanian nationalists who formed guerilla bands operating in the countryside. During the 19th and early 20th century, Albanian speaking Muslims were the majority population of Gjirokastër, while a small number of Greek-speaking families lived there.

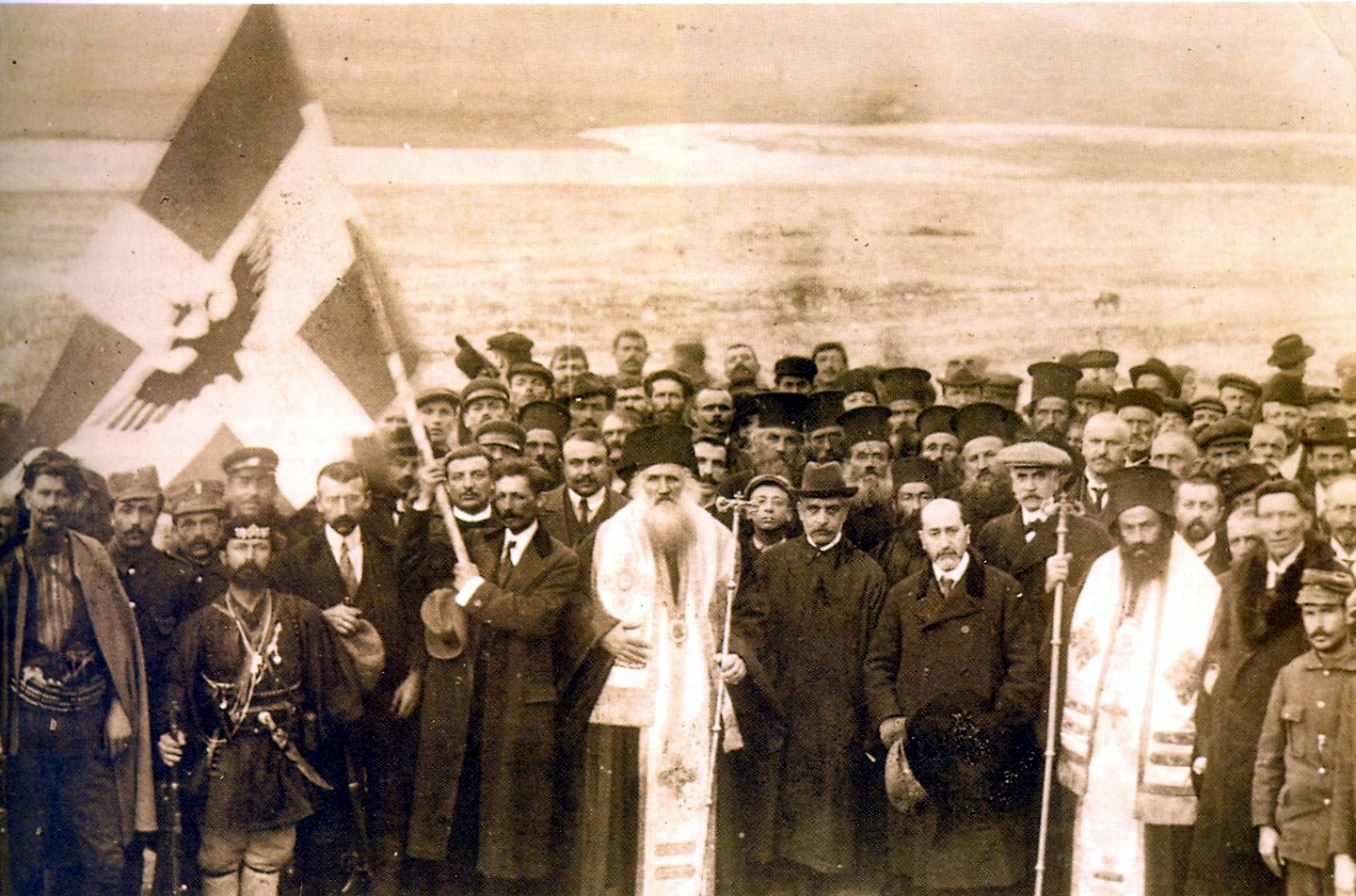
The official declaration of the Autonomous Republic of Northern Epirus 1 March 1914. The River Drino seen in the background.

Given its Greek minority, the city was claimed and taken by Greece during the First Balkan War of 1912–1913, following the retreat of the Ottomans from the region. However, it was awarded to Albania under the terms of the Treaty of London of 1913 and the Protocol of Florence of 17 December 1913.

This turn of events proved highly unpopular with the local Greek population, and their representatives under Georgios Christakis-Zografos formed the Panepirotic Assembly in Gjirokastër in protest. The Assembly, short of incorporation with Greece, demanded either local autonomy or an international occupation by forces of the Great Powers for the districts of Gjirokastër, Sarandë, and Korçë.

In April 1939, Gjirokastër was occupied by Italy following the Italian invasion of Albania. On 8 December 1940, during the Greco-Italian War, the Hellenic Army entered the city and stayed for a five-month period before capitulating to Nazi Germany in April 1941 and returning the city to Italian command. After the capitulation of Italy in the Armistice of Cassibile in September 1943, the city was taken by German forces and eventually returned to Albanian control in 1944.

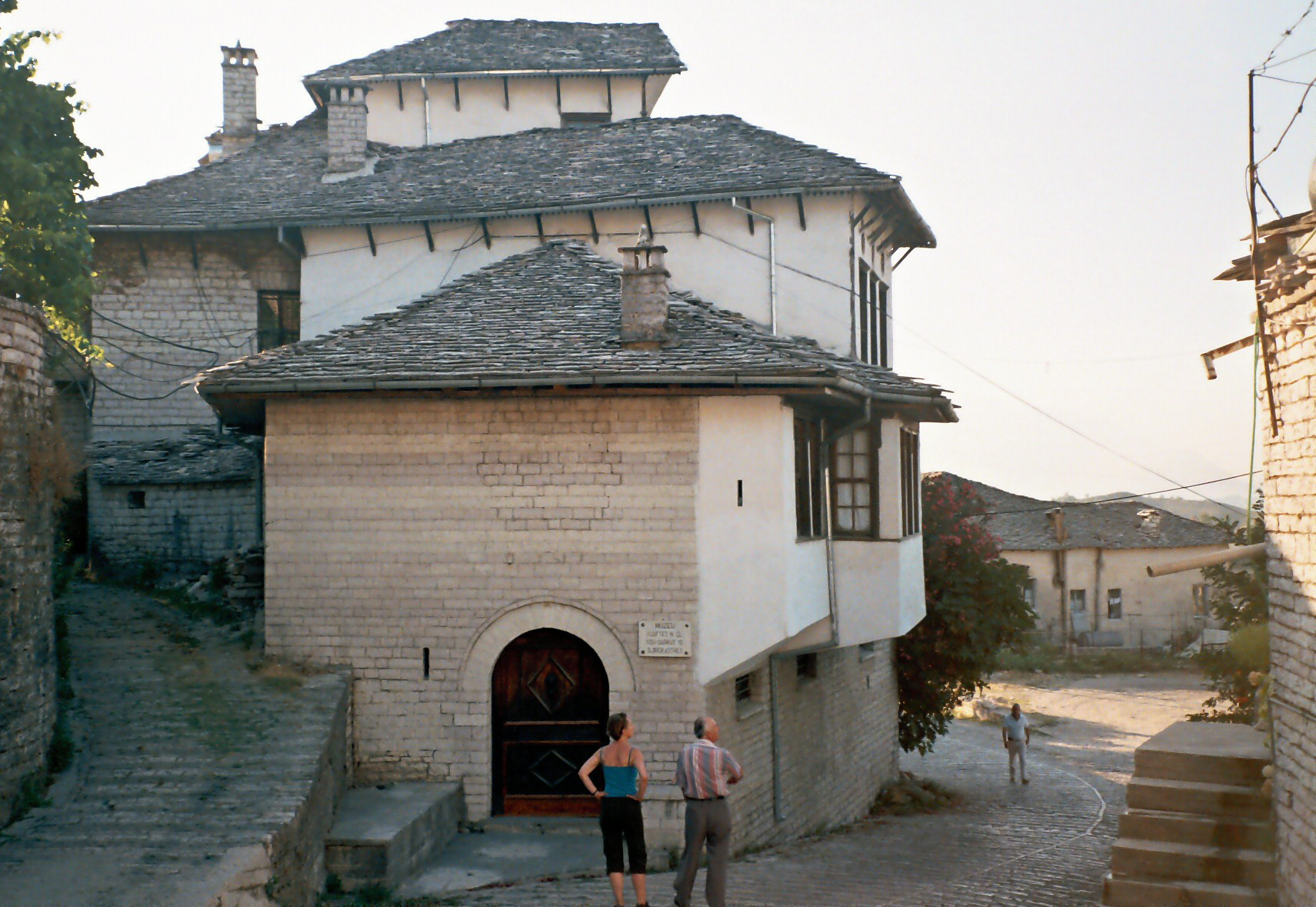
House of the post-war leader Enver Hoxha, where he grew up

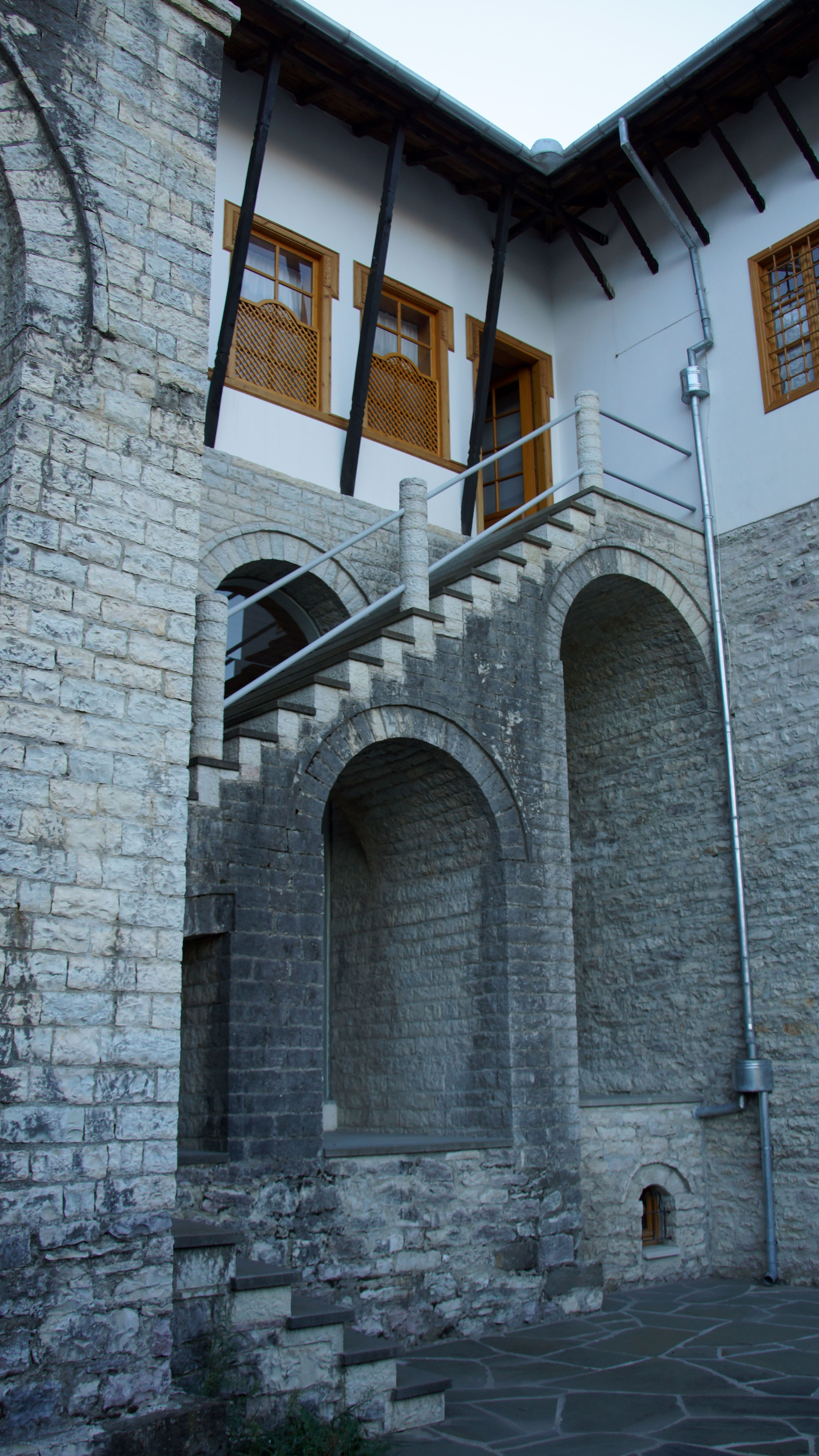
Konak (house) of writer Ismail Kadare in Gjirokastër

The postwar communist regime developed the city as an industrial and commercial centre. It was elevated to the status of a museum town, as it was the birthplace of the leader of the People's Socialist Republic of Albania, Enver Hoxha, who had been born there in 1908. His house was converted into a museum.

The demolition of the monumental statue of the authoritarian leader Enver Hoxha in Gjirokastër by members of the local Greek community in August 1991 marked the end of the one-party state It was the last statue in Albania to be demolished during the Fall of Communism in Albania, which happened on 28 July 1991, 5 months after the rest of the statues that were demolished since February and marked the end of the one-party state.

Gjirokastër suffered severe economic problems following the end of communist rule in 1991. In the spring of 1993, the region of Gjirokastër became a center of open conflict between Greek minority members and the Albanian police. The city was particularly affected by the 1997 collapse of a massive pyramid scheme which destabilised the entire Albanian economy. The city became the focus of a rebellion against the government of Sali Berisha; violent anti-government protests took place which eventually forced Berisha's resignation. On 16 December 1997, Hoxha's house was damaged by unknown attackers, but subsequently restored.

== Geography ==
The present municipality was formed at the 2015 local government reform by the merger of the former municipalities of Antigonë, Cepo, Gjirokastër, Lazarat, Lunxhëri, Odrie and Picar, that became municipal units. The seat of the municipality is the town Gjirokastër. The district's total population is 28,673 (2011 census), in a total area of 469.55 km^{2} (181.29 sq mi). The population of the former municipality at the 2011 census was 19,836.

=== Climate ===
Gjirokastër is situated between the lowlands of western Albania and the highlands of the interior, and has thus a hot-summer Mediterranean climate, though, (as is normal for Albania), much heavier rainfall than usual for this climate type.

Climate data for Gjirokastër
Month	Jan	Feb	Mar	Apr	May	Jun	Jul	Aug	Sep	Oct	Nov	Dec	Year
Mean daily maximum °C (°F)	9 (48)	11 (52)	13 (55)	18 (64)	23 (73)	28 (82)	32 (90)	34 (93)	27 (81)	23 (73)	15 (59)	11 (52)	20 (69)
Daily mean °C (°F)	5 (41)	6 (43)	7 (45)	12 (54)	16 (61)	20 (68)	23 (73)	24 (75)	19 (66)	14 (57)	10 (50)	6 (43)	14 (56)
Mean daily minimum °C (°F)	1 (34)	1 (34)	2 (36)	6 (43)	10 (50)	13 (55)	15 (59)	15 (59)	12 (54)	8 (46)	5 (41)	2 (36)	8 (46)
Average precipitation mm (inches)	176 (6.9)	170 (6.7)	160 (6.3)	82 (3.2)	106 (4.2)	63 (2.5)	32 (1.3)	25 (1.0)	64 (2.5)	112 (4.4)	233 (9.2)	305 (12.0)	1,528 (60.2)
Average rainy days	11	10	8	7	5	2	1	1	3	7	14	12	81
Average relative humidity (%)	71	69	68	69	70	62	57	57	64	67	75	73	67
Mean monthly sunshine hours	145.7	132.8	167.4	207	269.7	315	378.2	337.9	264	204.6	141	114.7	2,678
Mean daily sunshine hours	4.1	4.7	5.4	6.9	8.7	10.5	12.2	10.9	8.8	6.6	4.7	3.7	7.3
Average ultraviolet index	3	4	6	8	9	10	10	10	8	6	4	3	7
Source 1: Weatherbase, Nomadseason(Precipitation-UV)
Source 2: Weather2visit, Climate data

Climate data for Gjirokastër elevation at 194 m or 636 ft from 1961-1990
Month	Jan	Feb	Mar	Apr	May	Jun	Jul	Aug	Sep	Oct	Nov	Dec	Year
Record high °C (°F)	20.1 (68.2)	23.3 (73.9)	27.2 (81.0)	28.7 (83.7)	34.3 (93.7)	38.9 (102.0)	42.6 (108.7)	39.5 (103.1)	37.4 (99.3)	32.5 (90.5)	26.8 (80.2)	21.5 (70.7)	42.6 (108.7)
Mean daily maximum °C (°F)	10.0 (50.0)	11.9 (53.4)	15.1 (59.2)	19.1 (66.4)	24.3 (75.7)	28.6 (83.5)	31.8 (89.2)	31.8 (89.2)	28.1 (82.6)	22.0 (71.6)	15.7 (60.3)	11.1 (52.0)	20.8 (69.4)
Mean daily minimum °C (°F)	0.4 (32.7)	1.5 (34.7)	3.4 (38.1)	6.7 (44.1)	10.5 (50.9)	13.7 (56.7)	15.3 (59.5)	15.2 (59.4)	12.3 (54.1)	8.4 (47.1)	4.6 (40.3)	1.6 (34.9)	7.8 (46.0)
Record low °C (°F)	−10.1 (13.8)	−8.0 (17.6)	−16.6 (2.1)	−1.8 (28.8)	2.2 (36.0)	5.8 (42.4)	8.6 (47.5)	8.3 (46.9)	1.7 (35.1)	−1.7 (28.9)	−5.9 (21.4)	−17.4 (0.7)	−17.4 (0.7)
Average precipitation mm (inches)	—	—	—	—	—	—	—	—	—	—	—	—	1,887.5 (74.31)
Average rainy days (≥ 1.0 mm)	—	—	—	—	—	—	—	—	—	—	—	—	102.0
Average snowy days	—	—	—	—	—	—	—	—	—	—	—	—	4.0
Average relative humidity (%)	—	—	—	—	—	—	—	—	—	—	—	—	74.0
Mean monthly sunshine hours	—	—	—	—	—	—	—	—	—	—	—	—	2,456.8
Source: National Oceanic and Atmospheric Administration (NOAA)

== Economy ==
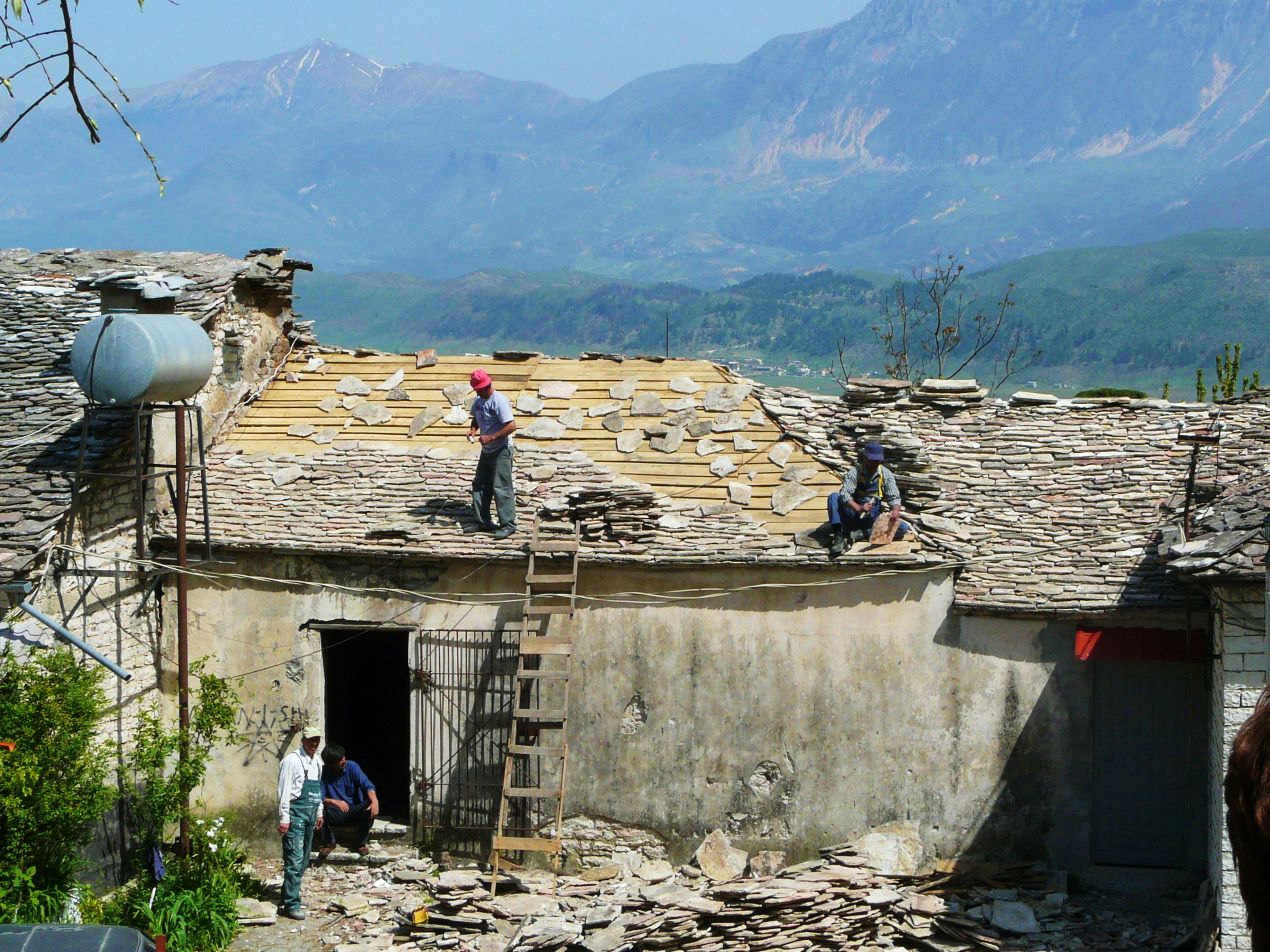
Reconstruction of the roof of a traditional house

Gjirokastër is principally a commercial center with some industries, notably the production of foodstuffs, leather, and textiles. Recently a regional agricultural market that trades locally produced groceries has been built in the city. Given the potential of southern Albania to supply organically grown products, and its relationship with Greek counterparts of the nearby city of Ioannina, it is likely that the market will dedicate itself to organic farming in the future. However, trademarking and marketing of such products are currently far from European standards. The Chamber of Commerce of the city, created in 1988, promotes trade with the Greek border areas. As part of the financial support from Greece to Albania, the Hellenic Armed Forces built a hospital in the city.

In recent years, many traditional houses are being reconstructed and owners lured to come back, thus revitalizing tourism as a potential revenue source for the local economy. However, some houses continue to degrade from lack of investment, abandonment or inappropriate renovations as local craftsmen are not part of these projects. In 2010, following the Greek economic crisis, the city was one of the first areas in Albania to suffer, since many Albanian emigrants in Greece are becoming unemployed and thus are returning home.

== Infrastructure ==
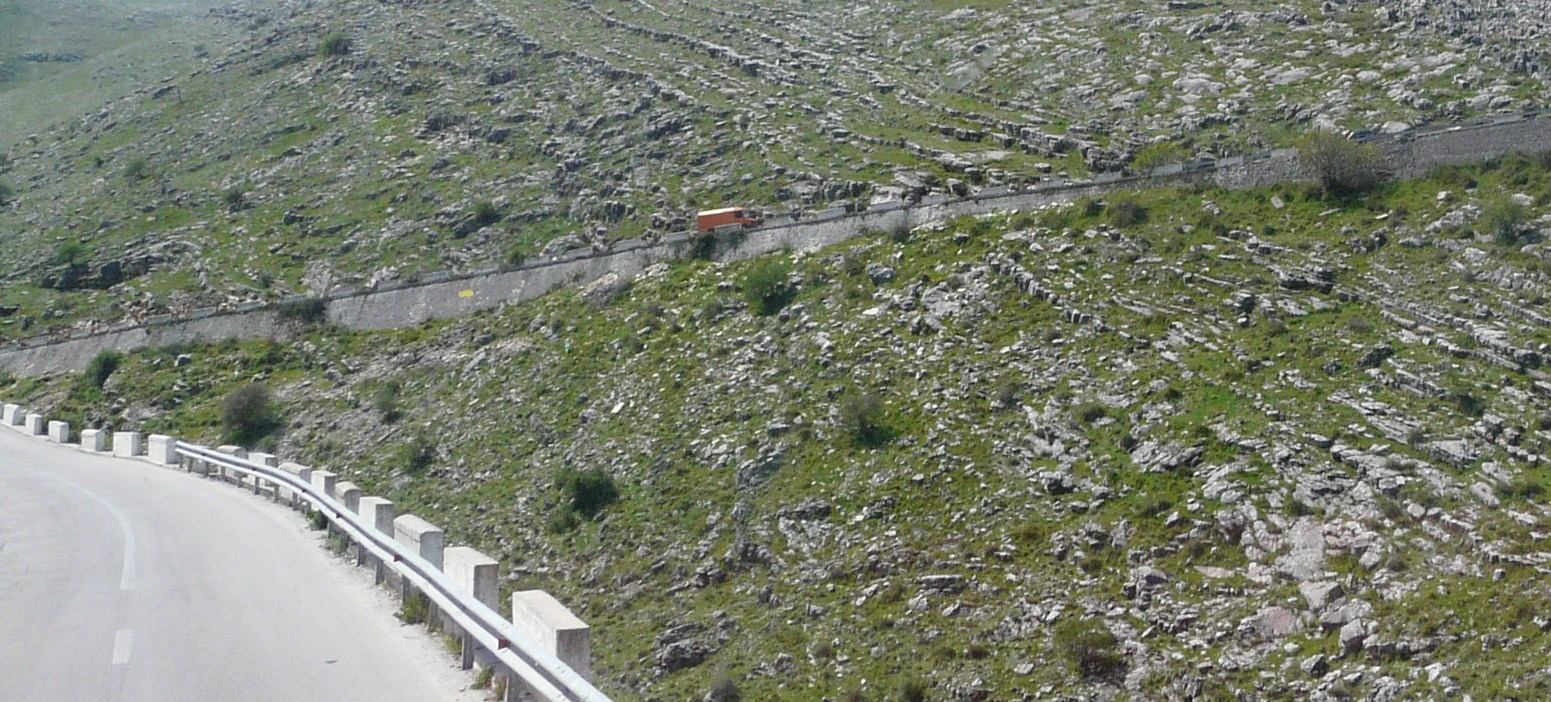
Mountain road SH78 near Muzina Pass connecting with the coast

Gjirokastër is served by the SH4 Highway, which connects it to Tepelenë in the north and the Dropull region and Greek border 30 km (19 mi) to the south.

=== Education ===
The first school in the city, a Greek language school, was erected in the city in 1663. It was sponsored by local merchants and functioned under the supervision of the local bishop. In 1821, when the Greek War of Independence broke out, it was destroyed, but it was reopened in 1830. In 1727 a madrasa started to function in the city, and it worked uninterruptedly for 240 years until 1967, when it was closed due to the Cultural Revolution applied in communist Albania. In 1861–1862 a Greek language school for girls was founded, financially supported by the local Greek benefactor Christakis Zografos. The first Albanian school in Gjirokastër was opened in 1886. Today there are 14 schools in Albanian language and two bilingual Albanian-Greek schools in the city.

The city is home to the Eqrem Çabej University, which opened its doors in 1968. The university has recently been experiencing low enrollments, and as a result the departments of Physics, Mathematics, Biochemistry, and Kindergarten Education did not function during the 2008–2009 academic year. In 2006, the establishment of a second university in Gjirokastër, a Greek-language one, was agreed upon after discussions between the Albanian and Greek governments. The program had an attendance of 35 students as of 2010, but was abruptly suspended when the University of Ioannina in Greece refused to provide teachers for the 2010 school year and the Greek government and the Latsis foundation withdrew funding.

== Demographics ==
Historical population
Year	Pop.	±%
1950	11,723	—
1960	14,111	+20.4%
1969	15,900	+12.7%
1979	19,400	+22.0%
1989	24,207	+24.8%
2001	20,601	−14.9%
2011	19,836	−3.7%
2023	16,569	−16.5%

Gjirokastër rapidly grew in the Ottoman era and it was key area of Ottoman urbanization in the Balkans. It was one of the main cities in the Janina vilayet. The population of Gjirokastër was predominantly Albanian-speaking in the final Ottoman era (late 19th/early 20th century) except for a small number of Greek-speaking families. In the period of the Second World War and its aftermath, some Albanian-speaking Orthodox Christians from the nearby region of Lunxhëri settled in Gjirokastër. Some inhabitants from the Zagori region in Albania also settled in the town. In the 2000s, the town's population fluctuated approximately between 42,000 and 47,000 people.

Gjirokastër is home to an ethnic Greek community that according to Human Rights Watch numbered about 4,000 out of 30,000 in 1989, although Greek spokesmen have claimed that up to 34% of the town is Greek. Gjirokastër is considered a center of the Greek community in Albania. A Greek consulate is in the town. The Romani and Balkan Egyptians settled in Gjirokastër in 1967 and inhabit the Zinxhiraj neighbourhood, numbering 150 families. In 2000, the Organization for Security and Co-operation in Europe (OSCE) estimated the Romani and Balkan Egyptians compose 3.4 percent of the town's population. Post–communism, some Aromanians from Lunxhëri migrated to Greece, and after returning to Albania, they chose to settle in Gjirokastër instead of their former villages.

By population, Gjirokastër is the largest municipality in the Gjirokastër County. According to INSTAT, based on the 2011 Census, Gjirokastër Municipality was estimated to have 28,673 residents (a density of 53.91 persons/km2) living in 6,919 housing units, while the county as a whole had a total of 72,176 inhabitants. The population of the municipality included the urban and rural population in its Administrative Units such as: Antigonë, Cepo, Lazarat, Lunxhëri, Odrie and Picar. The city of Gjirokastër itself had a resident population of 19,836 inhabitants, who were a predominantly urban population. In the municipality, the population was spread out, with 16.76% from the age 0 to 14, 69.24% from 15 to 64, and 13.98% who were 65 years of age or older. As far as the city itself is concerned, the population was spread out, with 16.93% from the age 0 to 14, 70.27% from 15 to 64, and 12.78% who were 65 years of age or older.

The results of the 2011 census were affected by a boycott by minorities. The European Council's Advisory Committee on the Framework Convention for the Protection of National Minorities stated that "the results of the census should be viewed with the utmost caution and calls on the authorities not to rely exclusively on the data on nationality collected during the census in determining its policy on the protection of national minorities".

=== Religion ===
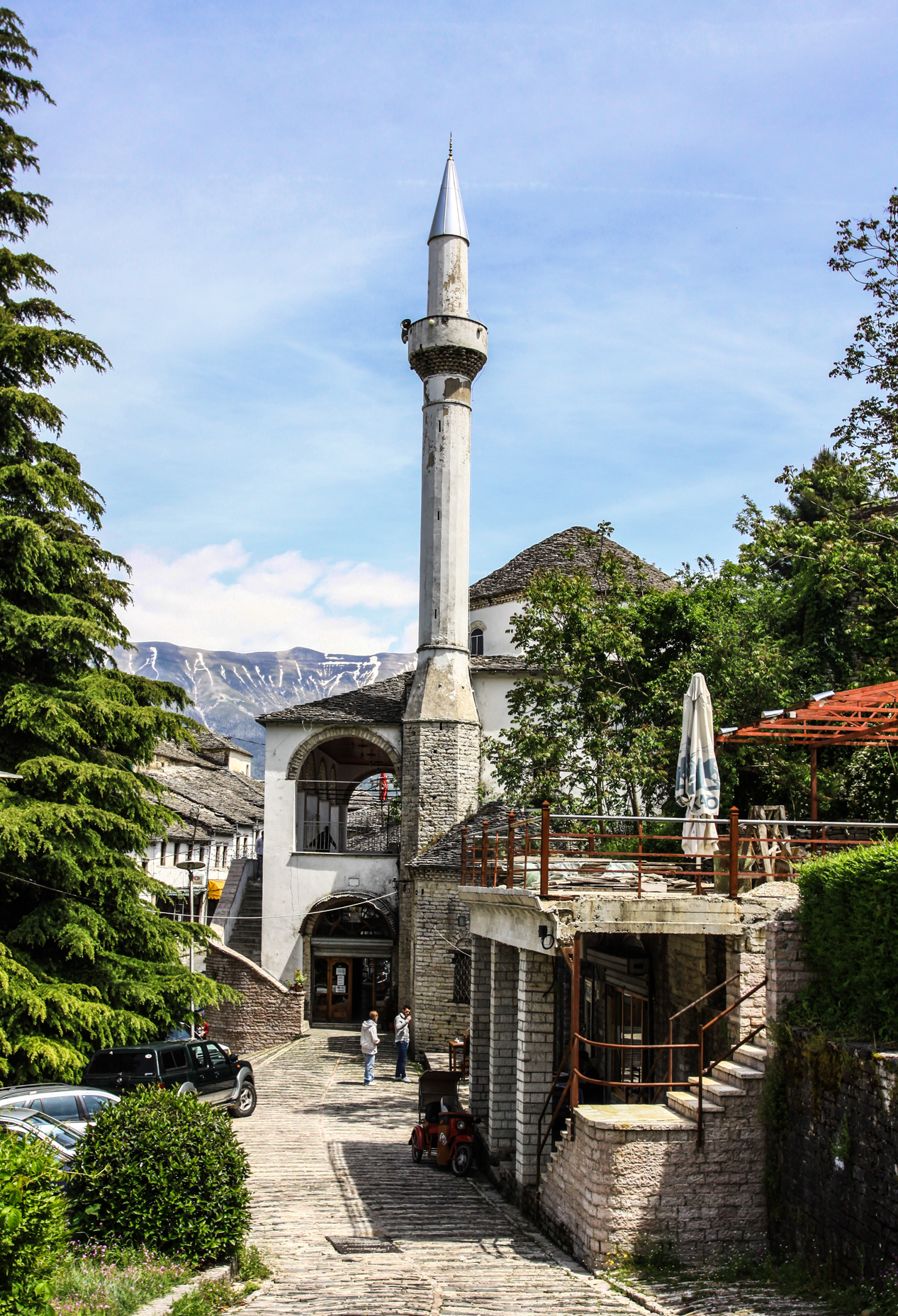
Gjirokastër Mosque, built in 1757

The region was part of the Eastern Orthodox diocese of Dryinoupolis, part of the metropolitan bishopric of Ioannina. It was first mentioned in a notitia of the 10th–11th century. With the destruction of nearby Adrianupolis its see was transferred to Gjirokastër and assumed the name Doecese of Dryinopoulis and Argyrokastron (Greek: Δρυϊνουπόλεως και Αργυροκάστρου). In 1835 it was promoted to metropolitan bishopric under the direct jurisdiction of the Ecumenical Patriarchate of Constantinople. Today, the city is home to a diocese part of the Orthodox Autocephalous Church of Albania. The two existing churches of the city were re-built at the end of the 18th century, after approval by the local Ottoman authorities who received large bribes by the Orthodox community. The Orthodox Cathedral of the "Transfiguration of the Saviour" was rebuilt at 1773 on the site of an older church and is located at the castle quarters.

During the Ottoman period Gjirokastër was a significant centre for the Muslim Sufi Bektashi Order, especially in relation to its spread and literary activity. In the early 19th century during the rule of Ali Pasha, British diplomat William Martin Leake during his journey from Vlorë to Gjirokastra and later to present-day Greece, in his diary describes his arrival on 26 December 1804, in the region of Derópoli, or Dropull as it was known from the local Albanians. According to him, its chief city Gjirokastër numbered about 2000 Muslim families and about 100 Christian families. While Libohovë, also then part of the same region, numbered half of that number with about 1000 Muslim families and 100 Christian families. In 1925, Albania became the world center of the Bektashi Order, a Muslim sect. The sect was headquartered in Tirana, and Gjirokastër was one of six districts of the Bektashi Order in Albania, with its center at the tekke of Baba Rexheb. The city retains a large Bektashi and Sunni population. Historically there were 15 tekkes and mosques, of which 13 were functional in 1945. Only Gjirokastër Mosque has survived; the remaining 12 were destroyed or closed during the Cultural Revolution of the communist government in 1967.

According to the previous 2011 census, which has been widely disputed due to irregularities in the procedure and its data affected by boycott, the percentages of the local population per religious group are: Islam 42,3%, Bektashis 5,3%, Eastern Orthodox 14,6%, Roman Catholics 2,8%, while a 35,2 had not declared any religion or is non-religious.

According to the Gjirokastër County 2023 census data (which includes other municipalities beyond Gjirokastër), the 2023 census revealed the following religious composition: 14.4% identified as Muslims, 21.0% as Bektashis, 1.2% as Catholic Christians, 25.3% as Orthodox Christians, 0.26% as Evangelical Christians, 7.28% as atheists, 14.36% as believers without denomination, and 15.95% as "Not stated/other".

== Culture ==
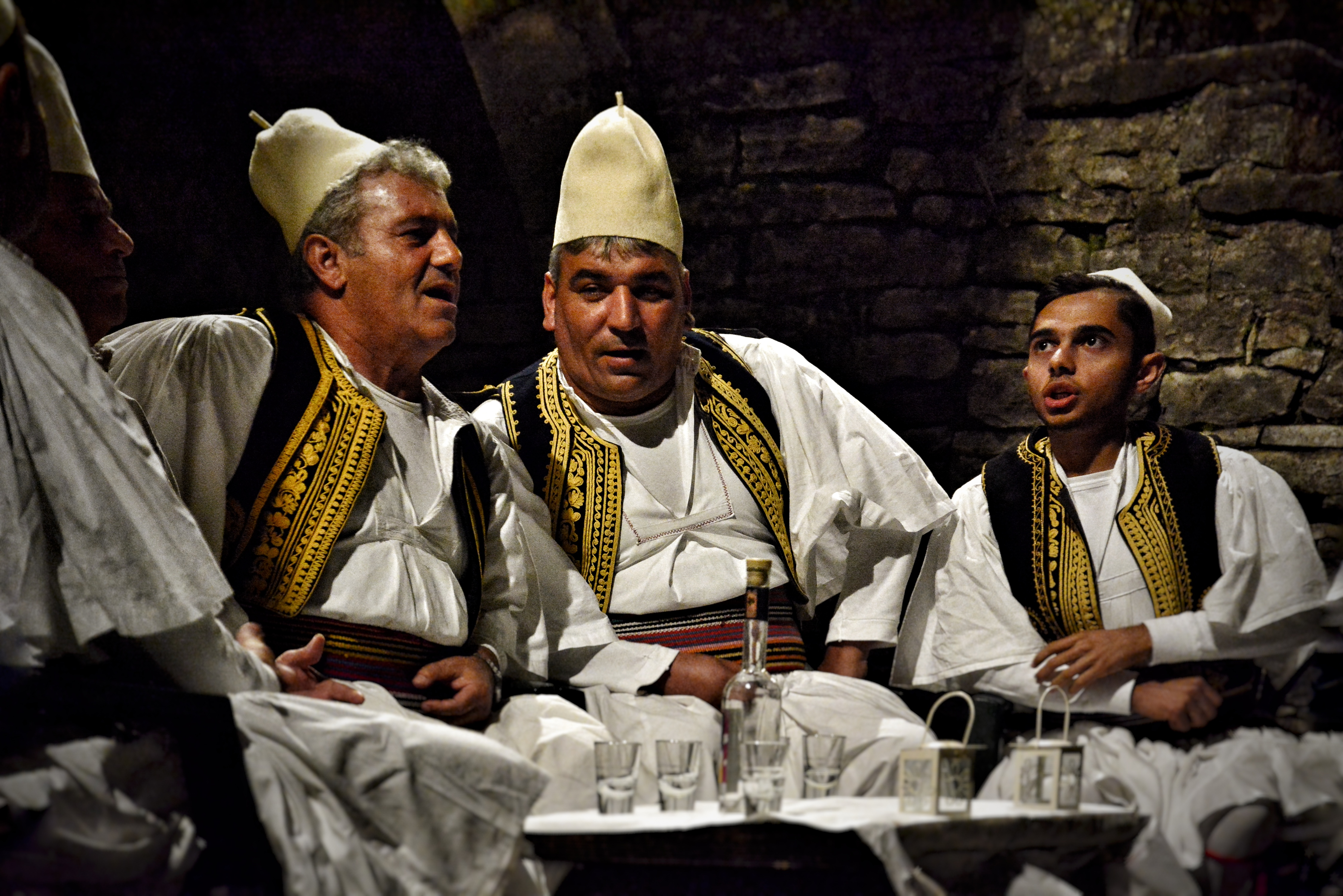
Grupi Argjiro, a male vocal ensemble from Gjirokastër. The group performs the Albanian iso-polyphony of Gjirokastër. They were awarded the title "Grand Master" of Albania by the then-president Bujar Nishani.

17th-century Ottoman traveller Evliya Çelebi, who visited the city in 1670, described the city in detail. One Sunday, Çelebi heard the sound of a vajtim, the traditional Albanian lament for the dead, performed by a professional mourner. The traveller found the city so noisy that he dubbed Gjirokastër the "city of wailing".

The novel Chronicle in Stone by Albanian writer Ismail Kadare tells the history of this city during the Italian and Greek occupation in World War I and II. It expounds on the customs of the people of Gjirokastër.

At the age of twenty-four, Albanian writer Musine Kokalari wrote an 80-page collection of ten youthful prose tales in her native Gjirokastrian dialect: As my old mother tells me (Albanian: Siç me thotë nënua plakë), Tirana, 1941. The book tells the day-by-day struggles of women of Gjirokastër, and describes the prevailing mores of the region.

Gjirokastër, home to both Albanian and Greek polyphonic singing, is also home to the National Folklore Festival (Albanian: Festivali Folklorik Kombëtar) that is held every five years. The festival started in 1968 and was most recently held in 2009, its ninth season. The festival takes place on the premises of Gjirokastër Fortress. Gjirokastër is also where the Greek language newspaper Laiko Vima is published. Founded in 1945, it was the only Greek-language printed media allowed during the People's Socialist Republic of Albania.

=== Landmarks ===
The city is built on the slope surrounding the citadel, located on a dominating plateau. Although the city's walls were built in the third century and the city itself was first mentioned in the 12th century, the majority of the existing buildings date from 17th and 18th centuries. Typical houses consist of a tall stone block structure which can be up to five stories high. There are external and internal staircases that surround the house. It is thought that such design stems from fortified country houses typical in southern Albania. The lower storey of the building contains a cistern and the stable. The upper storey is composed of a guest room and a family room containing a fireplace. Further upper stories are to accommodate extended families and are connected by internal stairs. Since Gjirokastër's membership to UNESCO, a number of houses have been restored, though others continue to degrade.

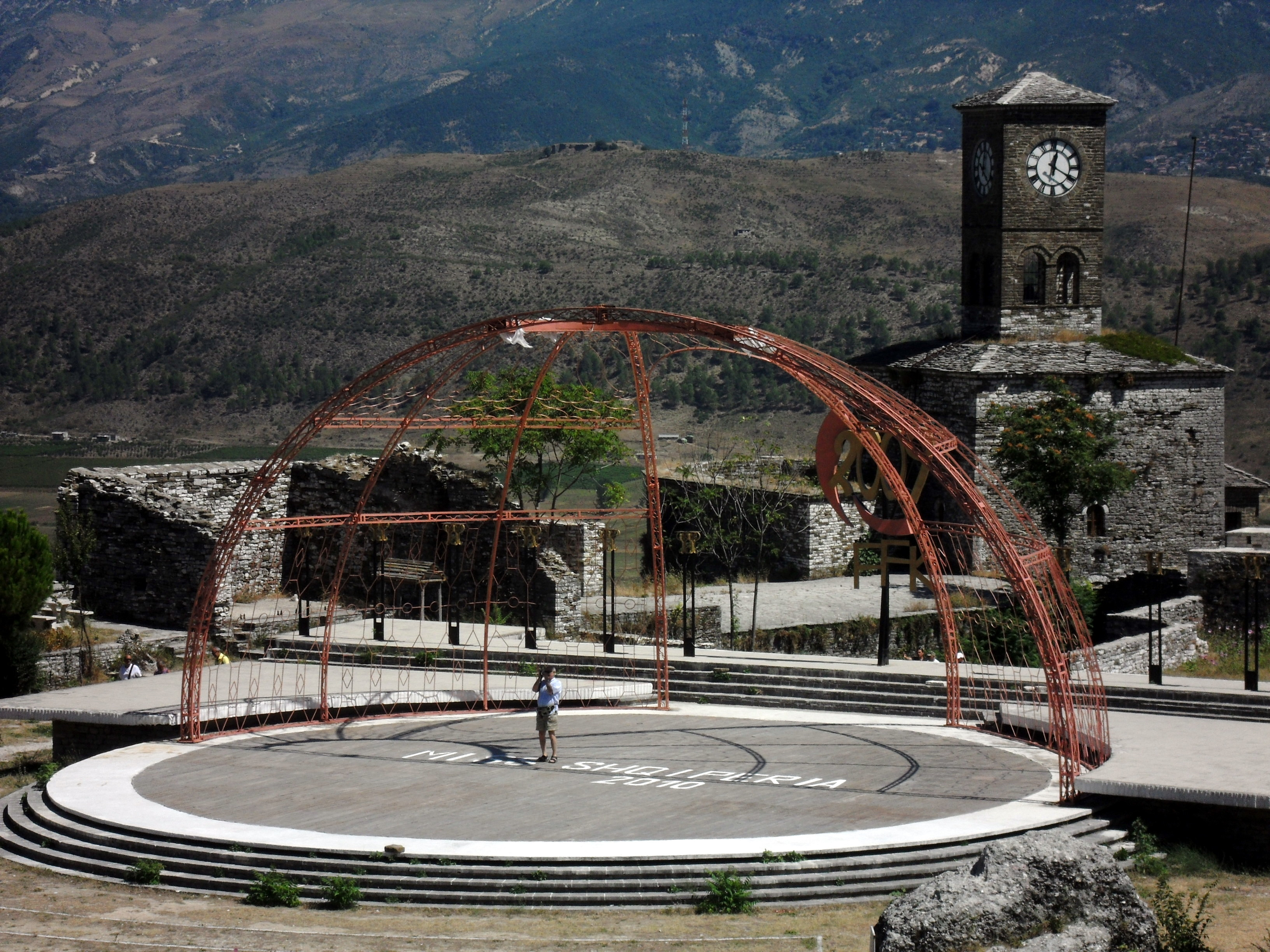
Stage of the Gjirokastër National Folklore Festival

Many houses in Gjirokastër have a distinctive local style that has earned the city the nickname "City of Stone", because most of the old houses have roofs covered with flat dressed stones. A very similar style can be seen in the Pelion district of Greece. The city, along with Berat, was among the few Albanian cities preserved in the 1960s and 1970s from modernizing building programs. Both cities gained the status of "museum town" and are UNESCO World Heritage sites.

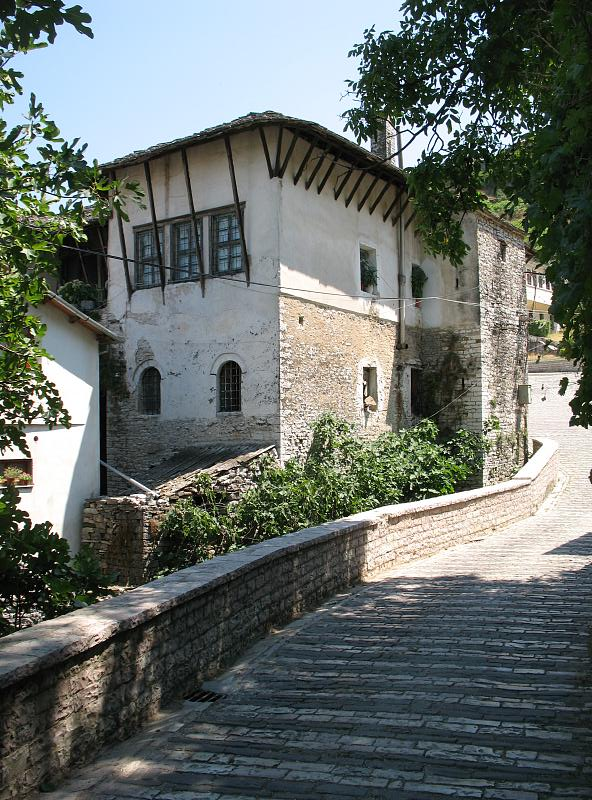
Typical streets in the city

Gjirokastër Fortress dominates the town and overlooks the strategically important route along the river valley. It is open to visitors and contains a military museum featuring captured artillery and memorabilia of the Communist resistance against German occupation, as well as a captured United States Air Force plane forced down by Anastas Ngjela, to commemorate the Communist regime's struggle against the imperialist powers. Additions were built during the 19th and 20th centuries by Ali Pasha of Ioannina and the government of King Zog I of Albania. Today it possesses five towers and houses a clock tower, a church, water fountains, horse stables, and many more amenities. The northern part of the castle was turned into a prison by Zog's government and housed political prisoners during the communist regime.

Gjirokastër features an old Ottoman bazaar which was originally built in the 17th century; it was rebuilt in the 19th century after a fire. There are more than 500 homes preserved as "cultural monuments" in Gjirokastër today. The Gjirokastër Mosque, built in 1757, dominates the bazaar.

When the town was first proposed for inclusion on the World Heritage list in 1988, International Council on Monuments and Sites experts were nonplussed by a number of modern constructions which detracted from the old town's appearance. The historic core of Gjirokastër was finally inscribed in 2005, 15 years after its original nomination.

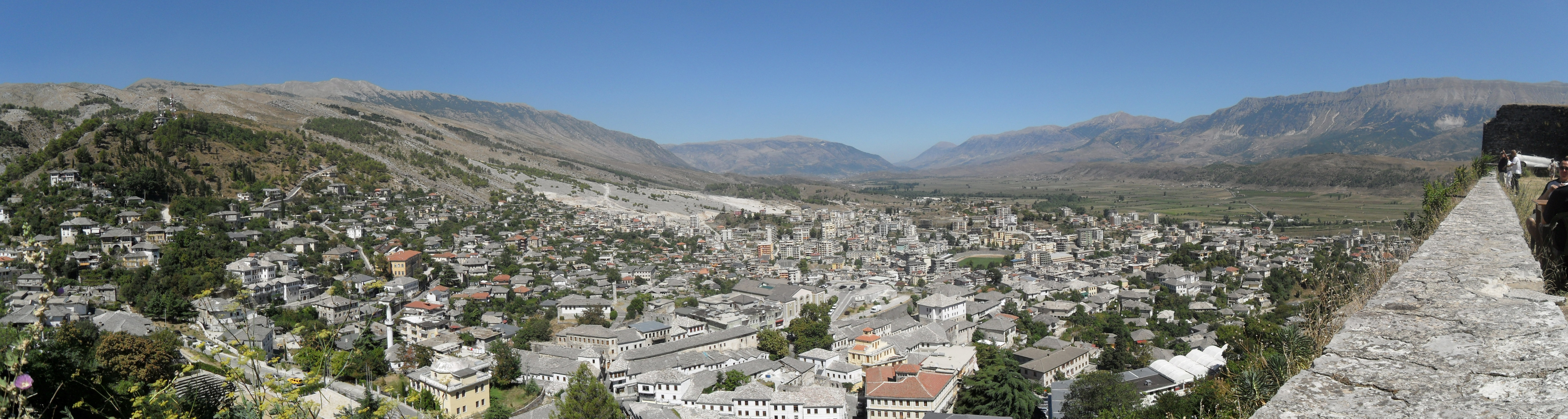
Panorama of Gjirokastër from the castle

=== Sports ===
Football is popular in Gjirokastër: the city hosts Luftëtari Gjirokastër, a club founded in 1929. The club has competed in international tournaments and currently plays in the Albanian Superliga until 2006–2007 and again from 2016. Matches are played in Gjirokastër Stadium, which can hold up to 8,400 spectators.

== International relations ==
Gjirokastër is twinned with:

- Grottammare, Italy
- Klina, Kosovo
- Lipjan, Kosovo
- Nardò, Italy

== Notable residents ==
- Ali Alizoti, 19th century politician
- Fejzi Alizoti, interim Prime Minister of Albania in 1914
- Kyriakoulis Argyrokastritis (−1828), revolutionary of the Greek War of Independence
- Arjan Bellaj, retired soccer player and member of the Albania national football team
- Elmaz Boçe, signatory of the Albanian Declaration of Independence and politician
- Bledar Devolli (born 1978), footballer
- Georgios Dimitriou, 18th century author
- Ioannis Doukas, 19th century painter
- Vangjel Dule, representative of the Greek minority in Albanian politics
- Rauf Fico (1881–1944), politician
- Bashkim Fino, former Prime Minister of Albania
- Christos Gikas, Greco-Roman wrestler
- Ardit Gjebrea (born 1963), Albanian singer, songwriter, producer and television presenter.
- Ramize Gjebrea (1923–1944), World War II partisan
- Gregory IV of Athens, scholar and Archbishop of Athens
- Altin Haxhi, international soccer player; capped in the Albania national team
- Veli Harxhi, signatory of the Albanian Declaration of Independence and politician
- Fatmir Haxhiu, painter
- Enver Hoxha (1908–1985), former first Secretary of the Albanian Party of Labor, and leader of socialist Albania
- Feim Ibrahimi, composer
- Ismail Kadare (1936–2024), novelist and poet, winner of the 2005 Man Booker International Prize, 2009 Prince of Asturias Award, and 2015 Jerusalem Prize
- Mehmed Kalakula, politician
- Xhanfize Keko movie director
- Saim Kokona (born 1934), cinematographer
- Albi Kondi (born 1989), football player
- Eqrem Libohova, former Prime Minister of Albania
- Sabit Lulo, politician
- Bule Naipi, World War II People's Heroine of Albania
- Omer Nishani, Head of State of Albania from 1944 to 1953
- Arlind Nora (born 1980), footballer
- Bahri Omari (1889–1945), politician
- Jani Papadhopulli, signatory of the Albanian Declaration of Independence and politician
- Manthos Papagiannis, 16th century revolutionary
- Xhevdet Picari, commander in the Vlora War
- Pertef Pogoni, politician
- Baba Rexheb, Bektashi Sufi religious leader and saint and 7th Dedebaba of the Bektashi Order
- Xhafer Sadik, 4th Dedebaba of the Bektashi Order
- Mehmet Tahsini, politician and professor
- Bajo Topulli, brother of Çerçiz, nationalist and guerrilla fighter
- Çerçiz Topulli, 20th-century nationalist and guerrilla fighter
- Haki Toska (1920–1994), politician
- Takis Tsiakos (1909–1997), Greek poet
- Alexandros Vasileiou, merchant and Greek scholar
- Michael Vasileiou, merchant, brother of Alexandros
- Mahmud Xhelaledini, politician
- Arjan Xhumba, retired soccer player and member of the Albania national football team

== Gallery ==
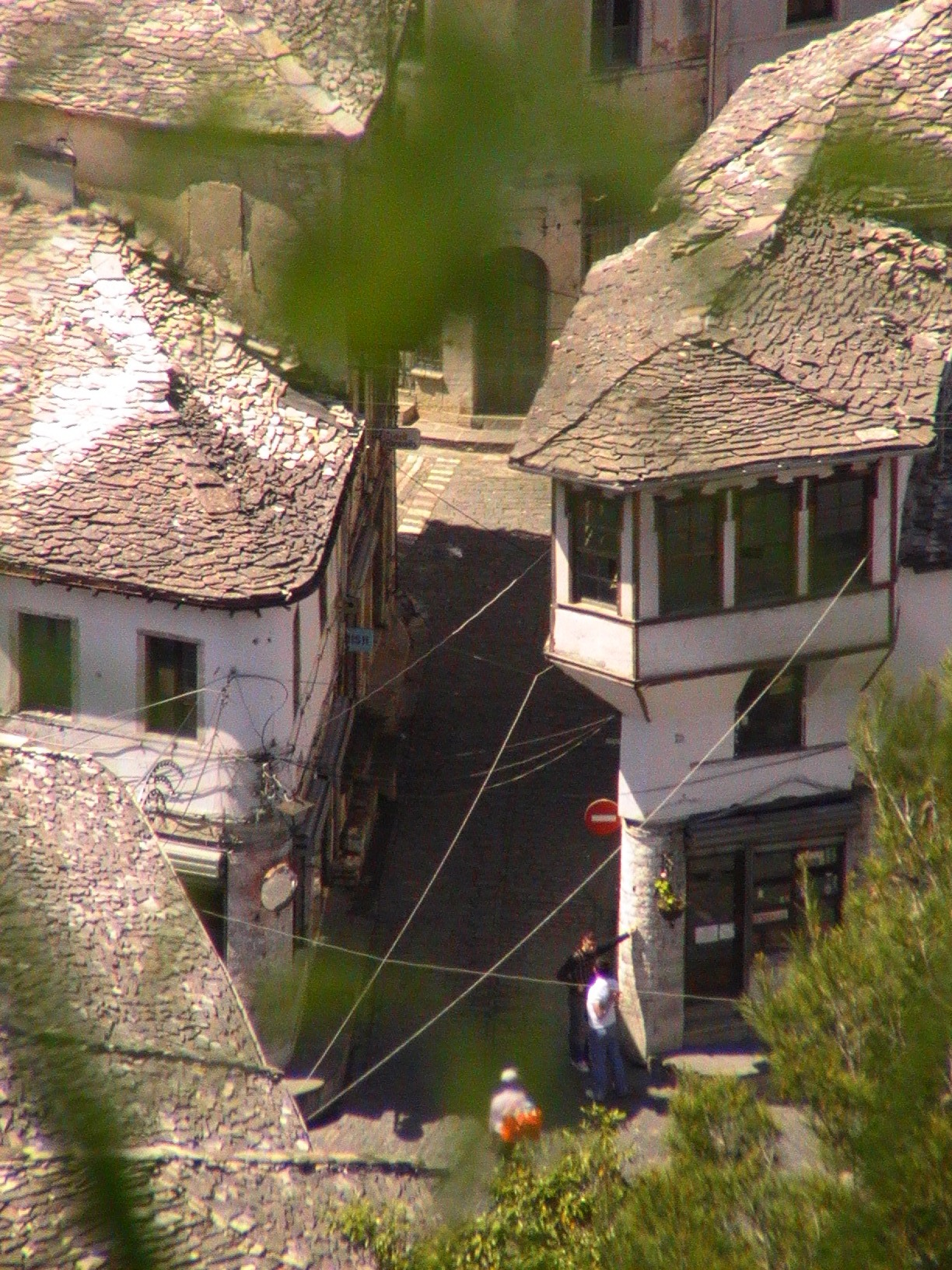
Street in the Old Bazaar

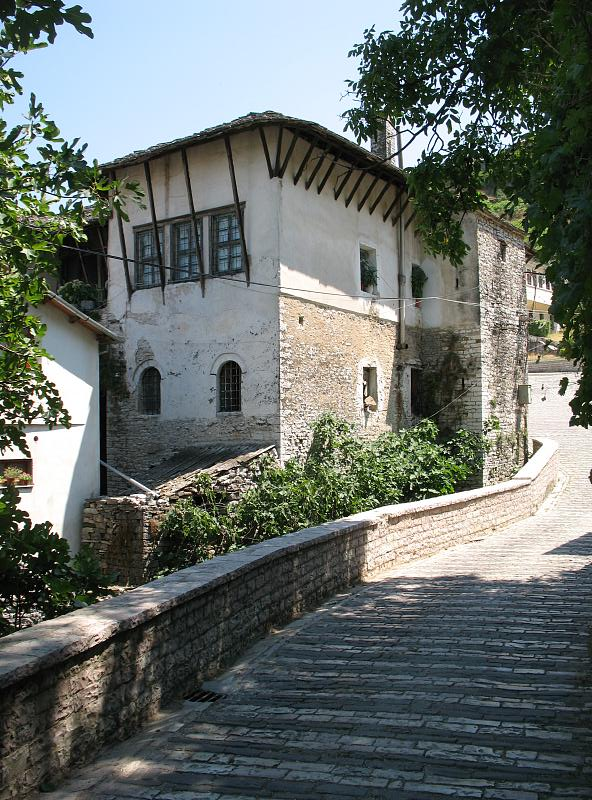
Street

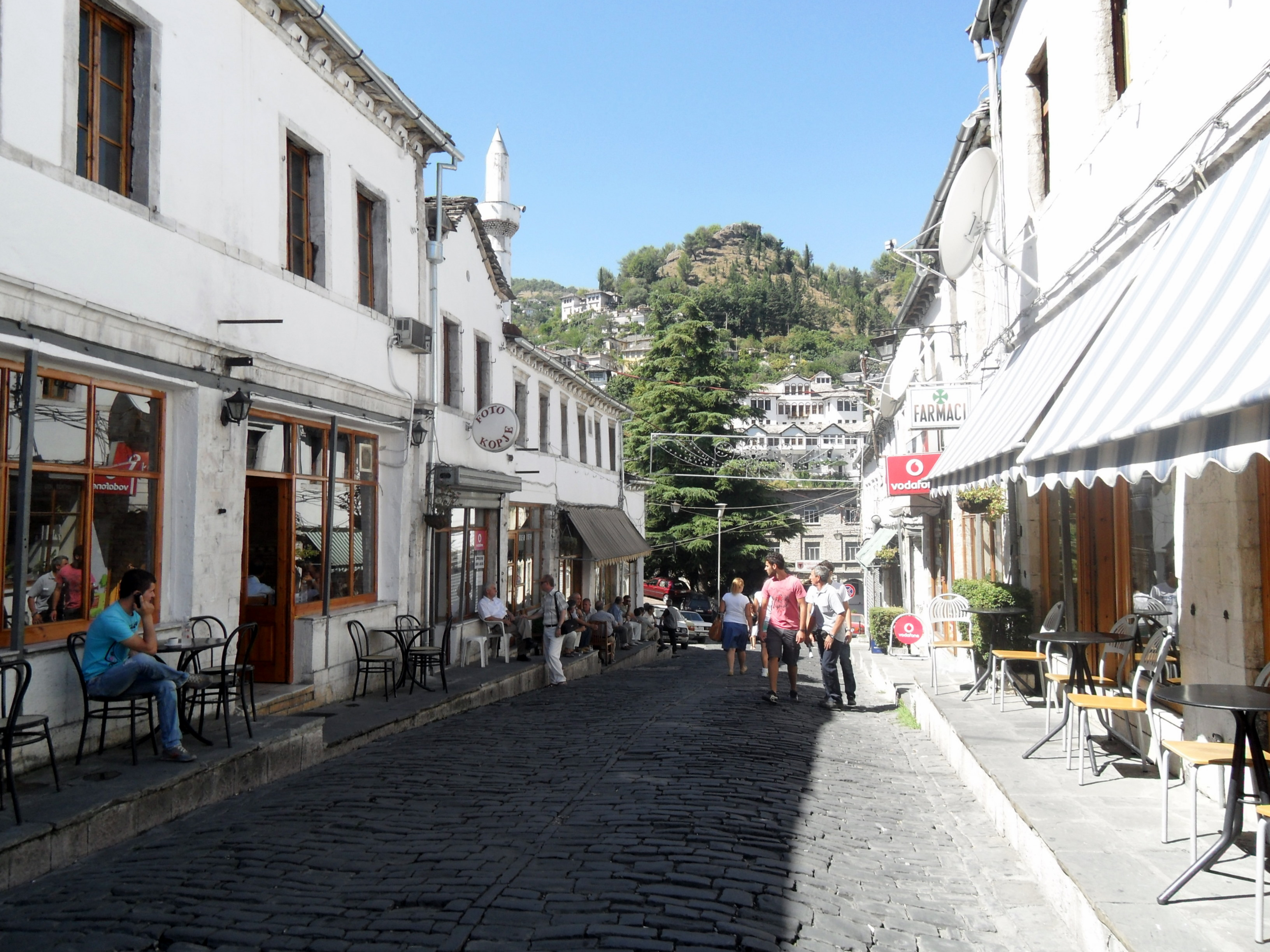
Street with cafes

Ottoman house

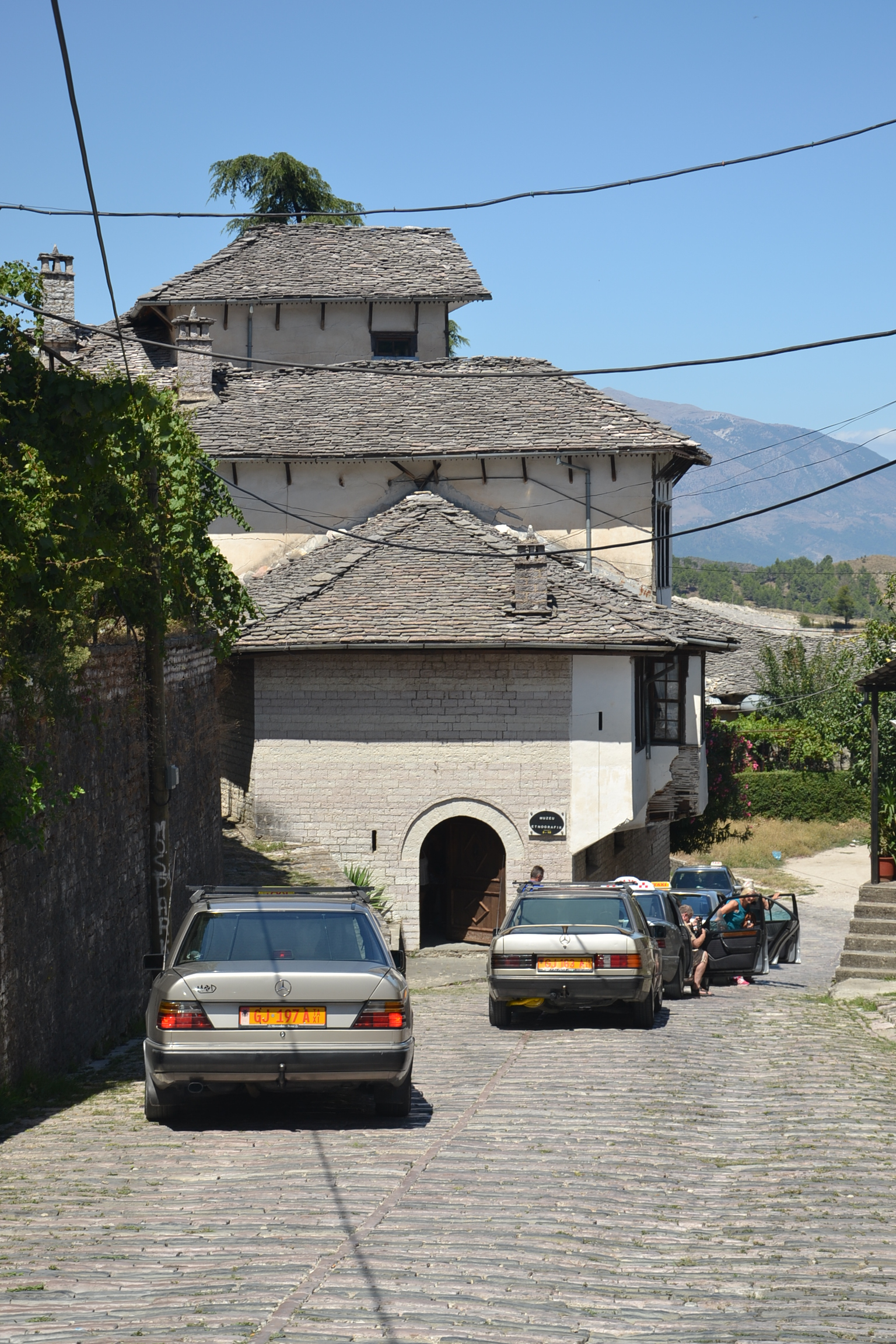
Mercedes along Enver Hoxha's house

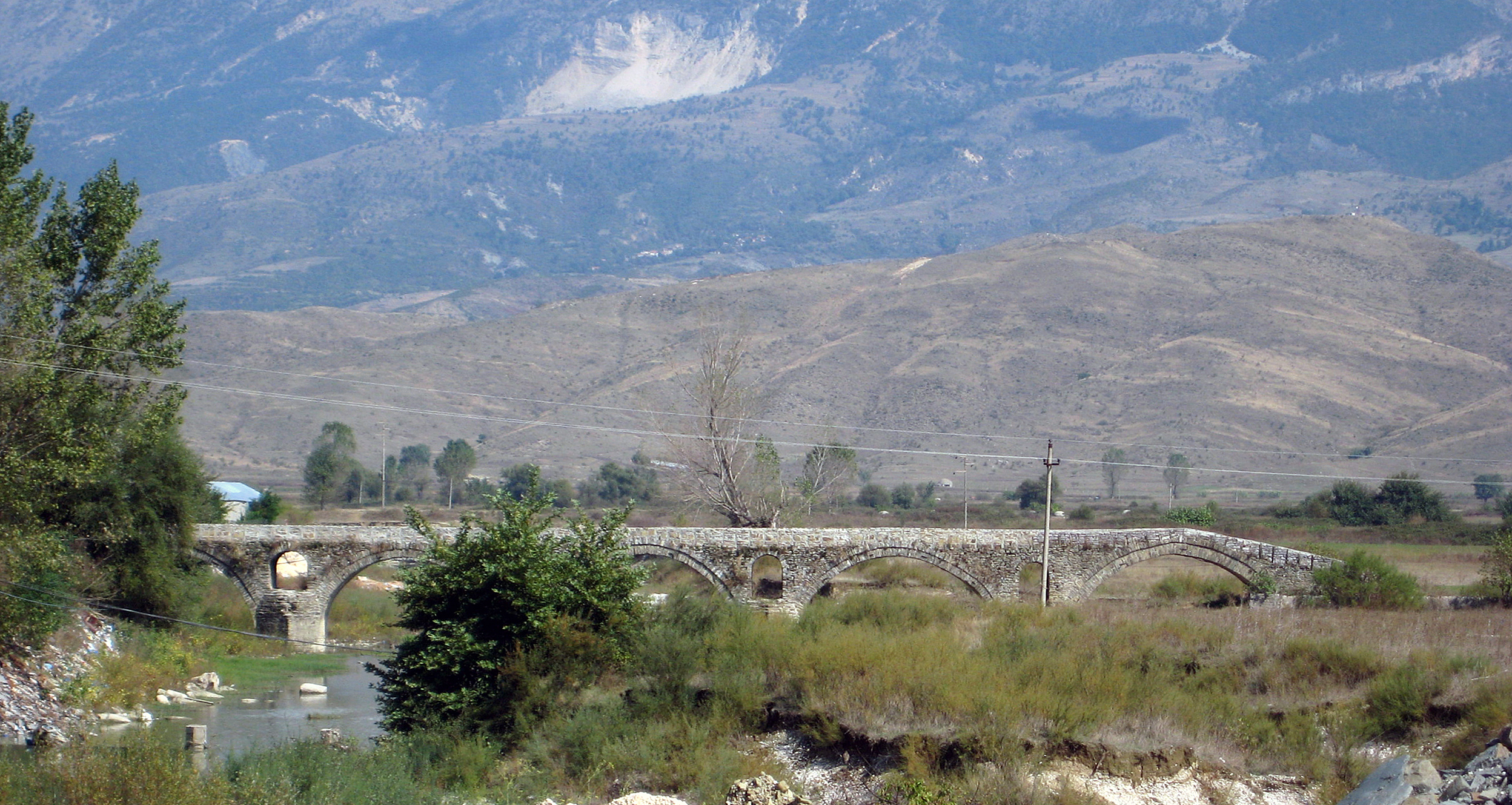
Ottoman bridge

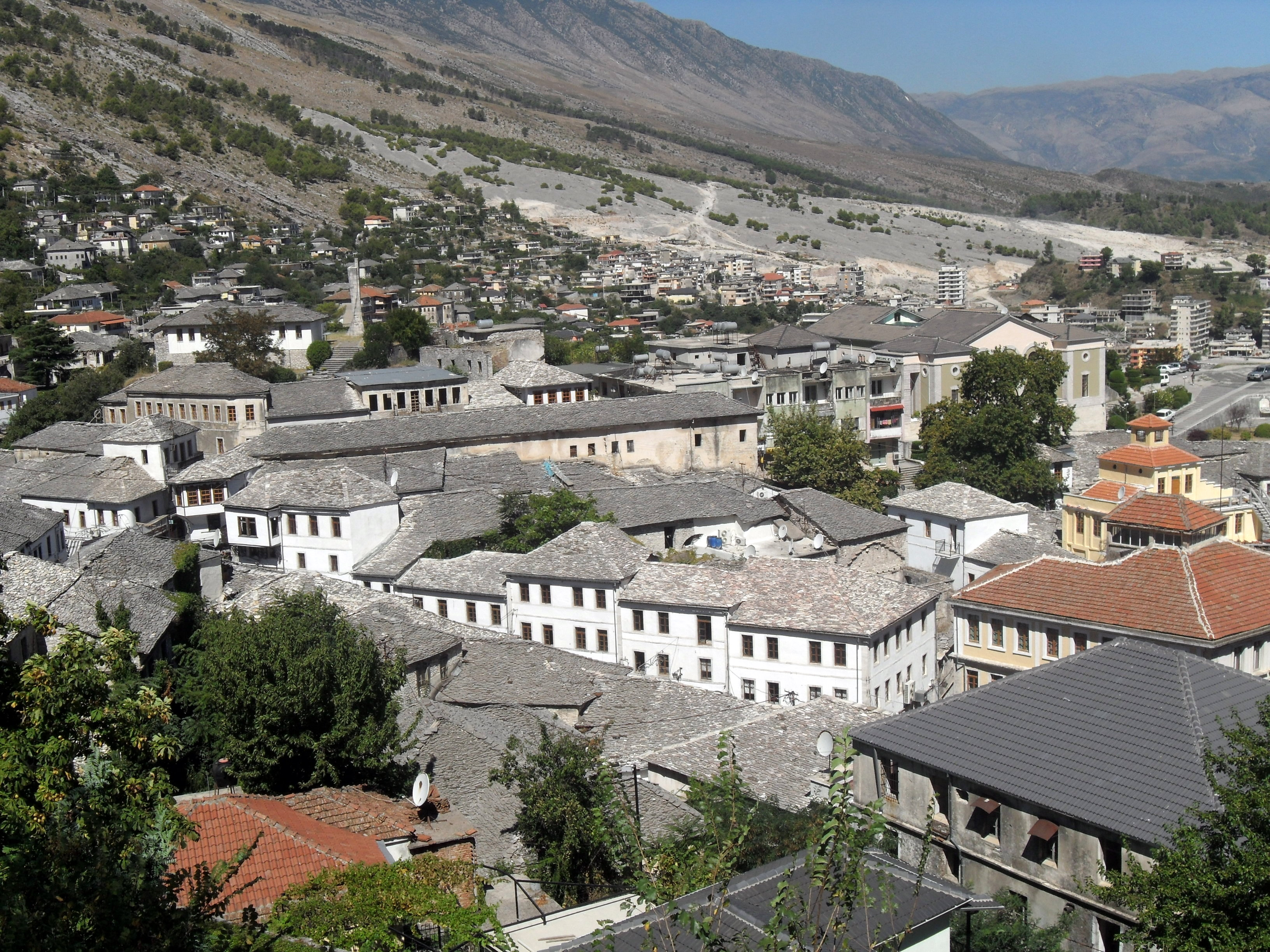
View of the citadel from the castle

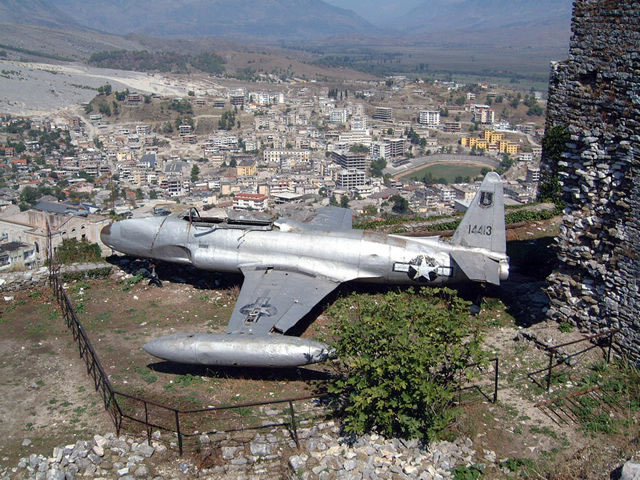
American Lockheed T-33 in the castle

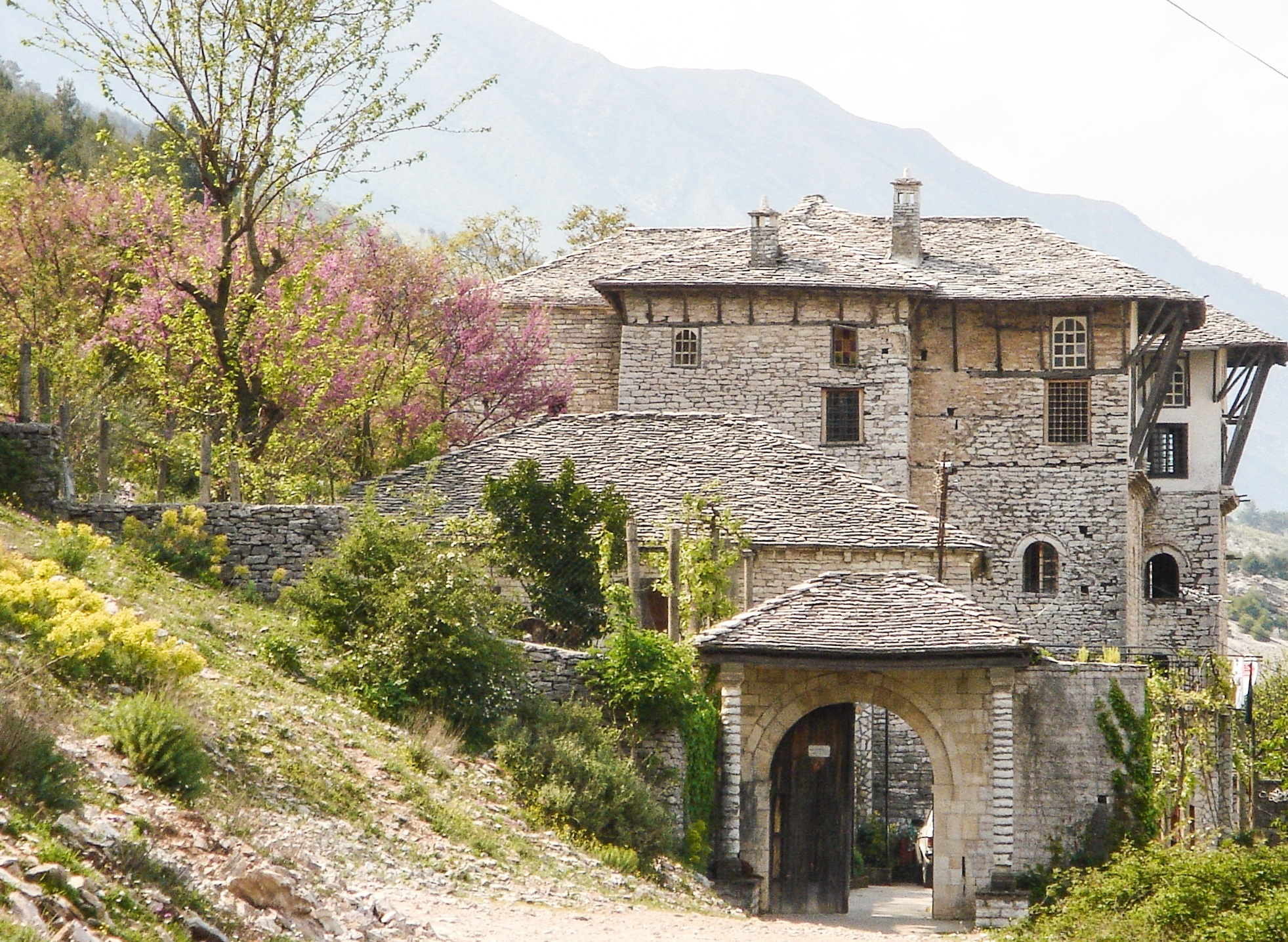
Old stone house, typical of the Gjirokastra area

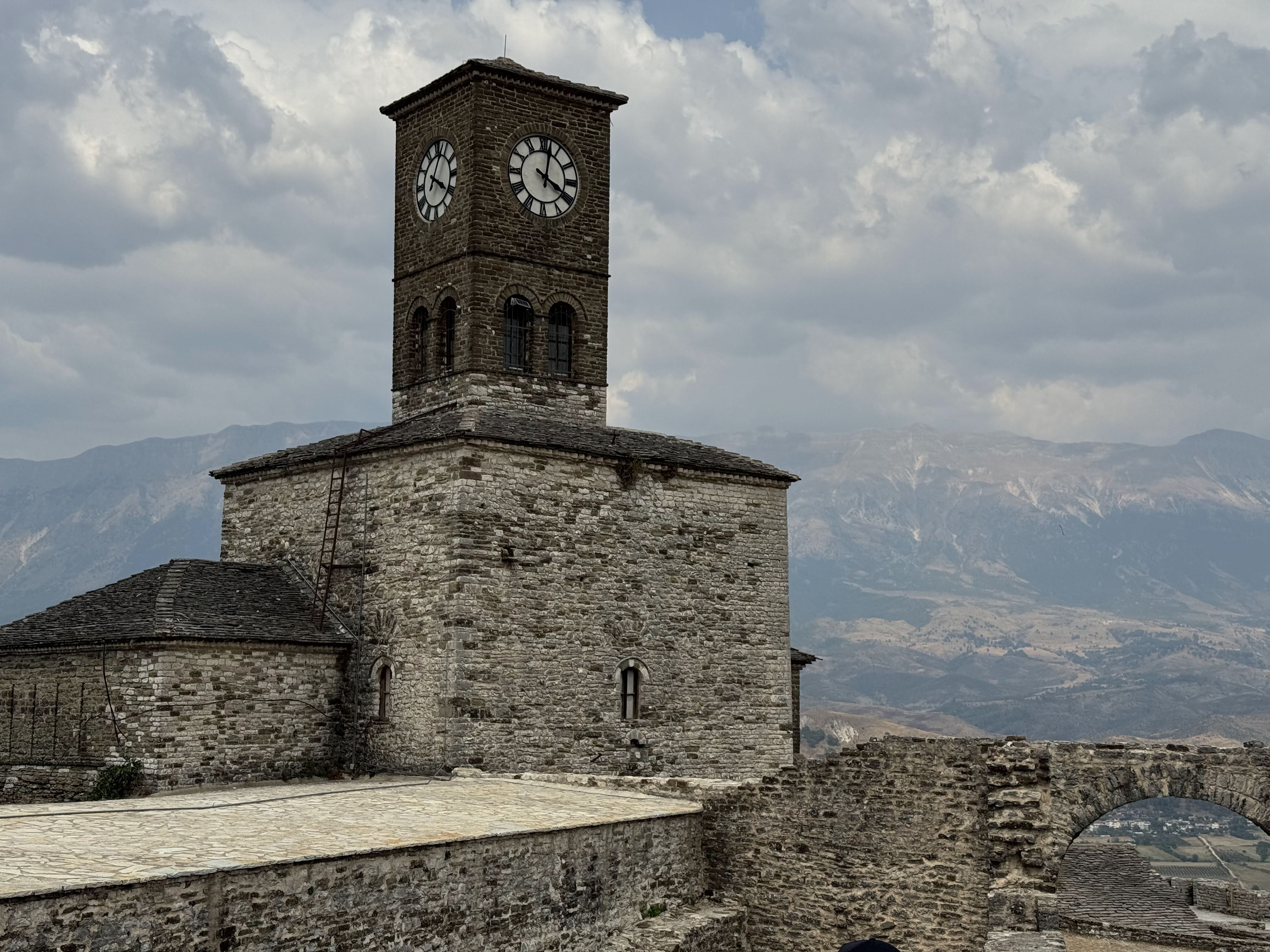
Clock tower of castle

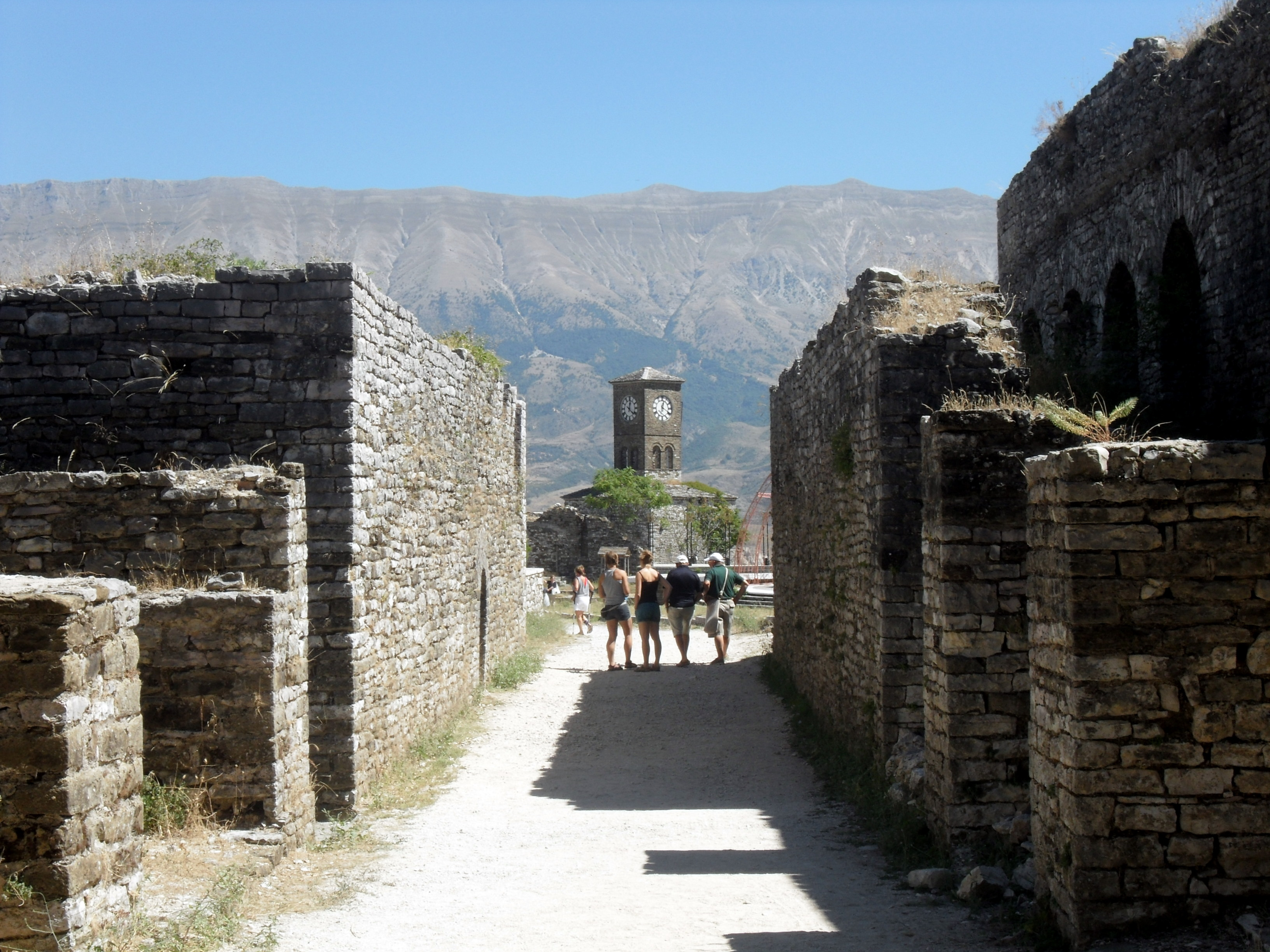
Path in the castle

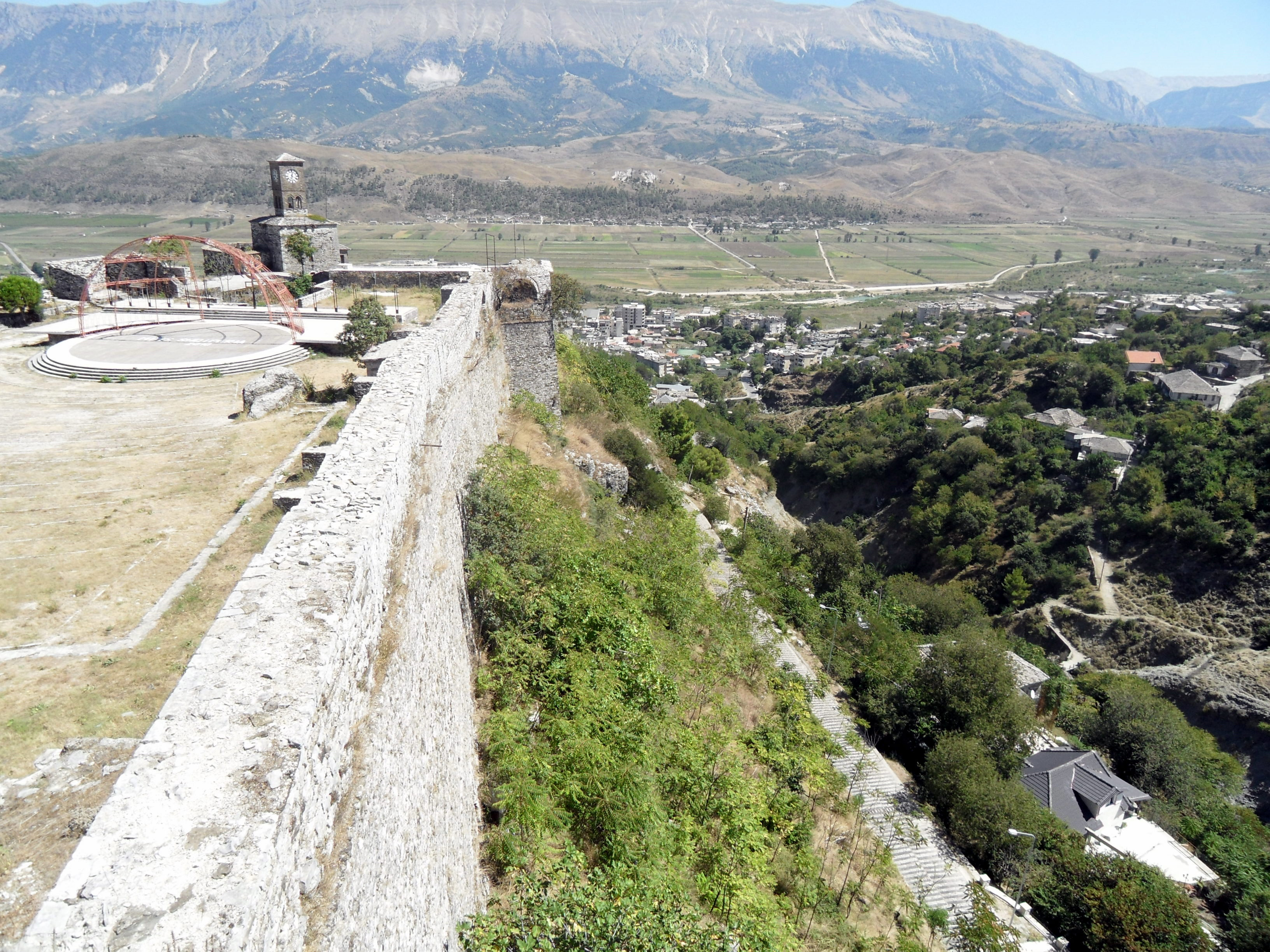
Castle wall

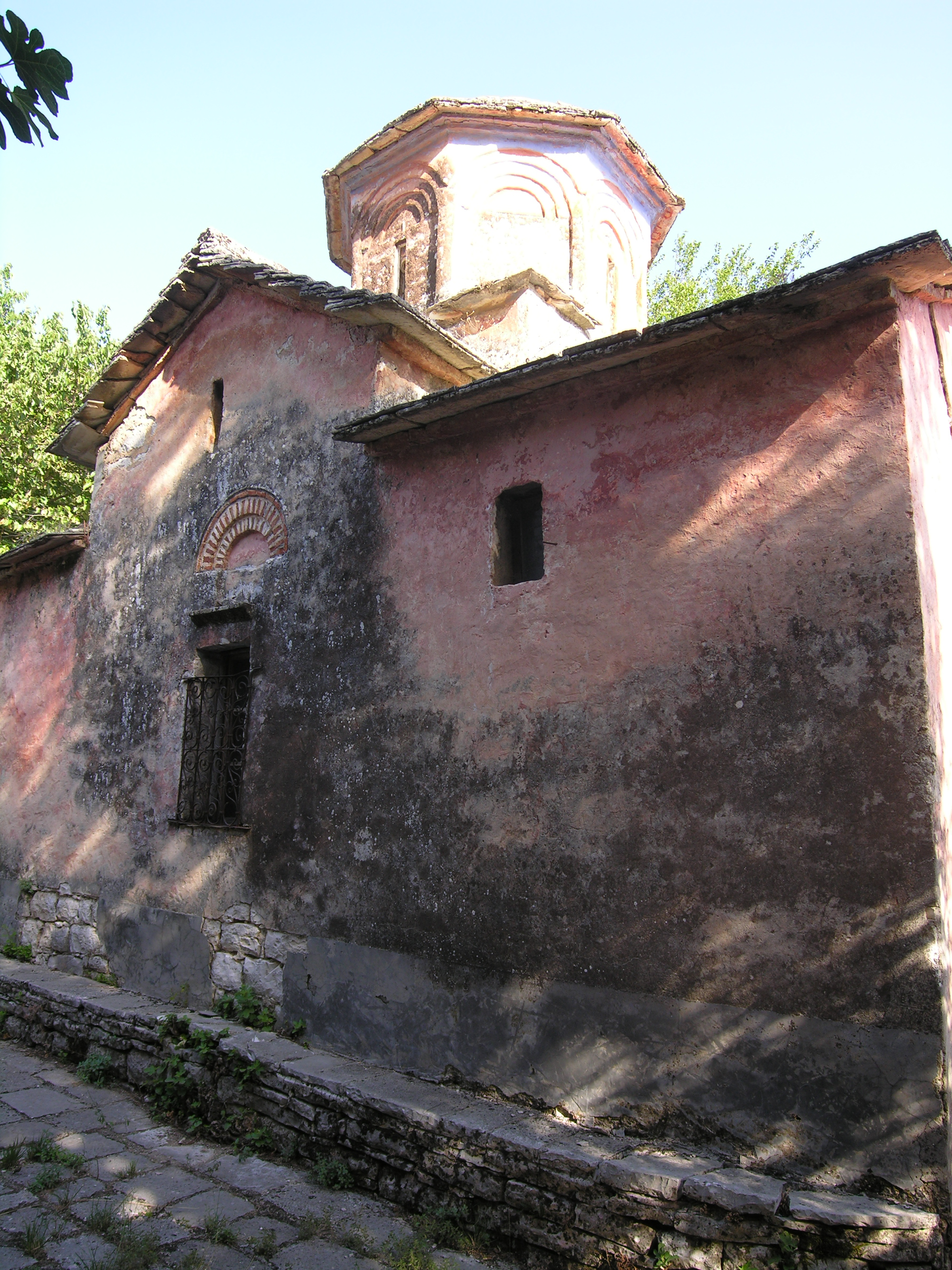
Dhuvjan Monastery

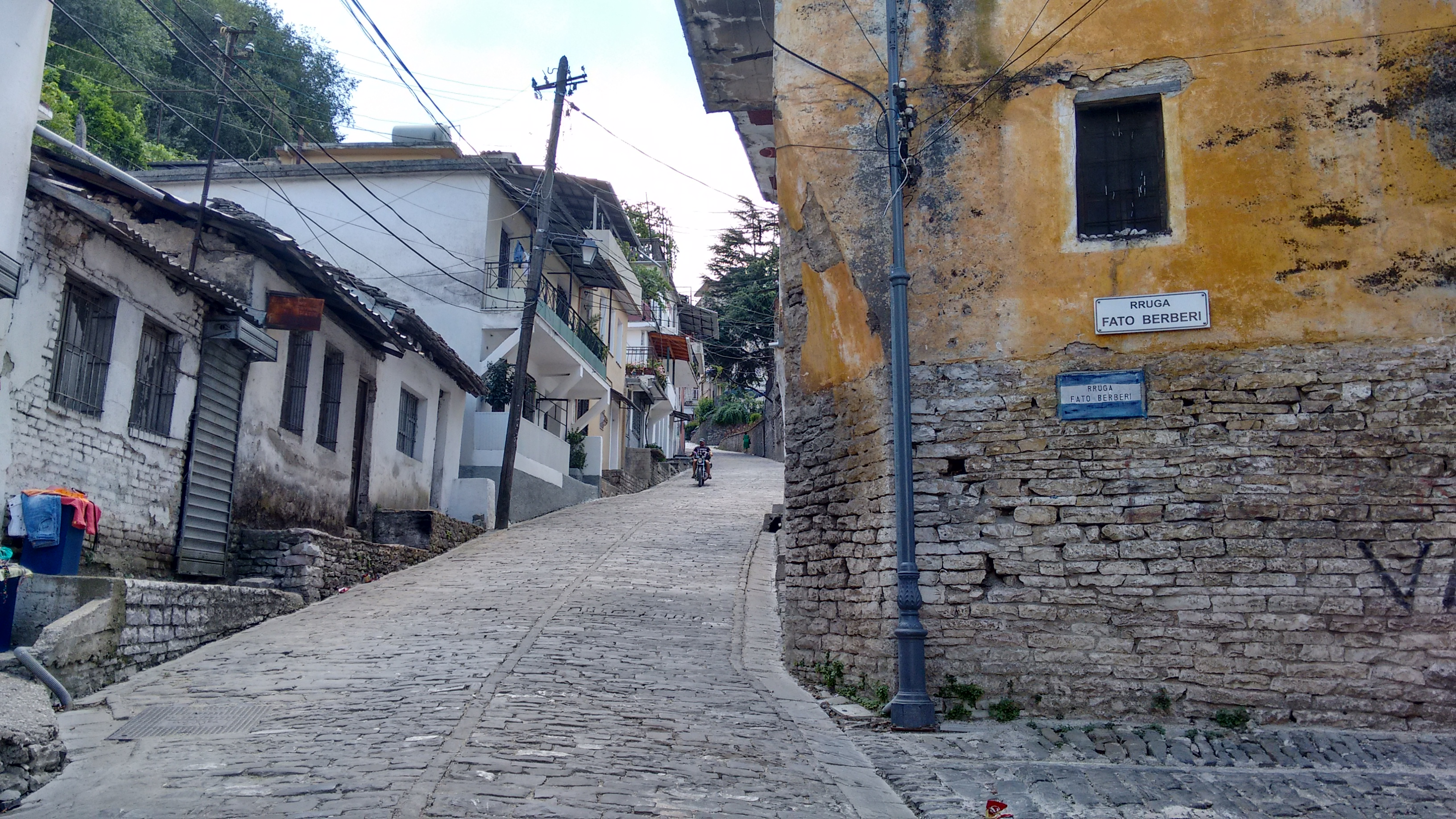
Street in Gjirokastër

== See also ==
- History of Albania
- Greeks in Albania

== Sources ==
- "Gjirokastër". Encyclopædia Britannica, 2006
- "Gjirokastër or Gjinokastër". The Columbia Encyclopedia, 2004
- Ward, Philip (1983). Albania: a travel guide. Oleander Press. ISBN 978-0-906672-41-9.
- Kokolakis, Mihalis (2003). Το ύστερο Γιαννιώτικο Πασαλίκι: χώρος, διοίκηση και πληθυσμός στην τουρκοκρατούμενη Ηπειρο (1820–1913) [The late Pashalik of Ioannina: Space, administration and population in Ottoman ruled Epirus (1820–1913)]. Athens: EIE-ΚΝΕ. ISBN 960-7916-11-5.
- Osswald, Brendan (2011). "L'Epire du treizième au quinzième siècle : autonomie et hétérogénéité d'une région balkanique (Thèse)". Université Toulouse le Mirail - Toulouse II.
