= Sabit Lulo =

Albanian politician

Sabit Lulo (1883-?) was an Albanian politician, active in the Ottoman Empire and Albania.

He was born in 1883 in Gjirokastër and was son of a kadi. From 1909 to 1913 he served as kaymakam in Tepelenë, Çermik and Rize, in Eastern Anatolia. In June 1913 he favoured the newly formed Principality of Albania and stopped his working activities for the Empire. In 1928 he is reported as still working in his native city as a simple official.
