= Pertef Pogoni =

Albanian politician

Pertef Pogoni, also known as Ibrahim Pertev, was a 20th-century Albanian politician.

Born in Gjirokastër in Janina Vilayet, Ottoman Empire (modern day Albania) in 1888, his father was Hoca-zade, Mehmed Avni, chief-qadi in Thessaloniki. He studied at the rüstive of Gjirokastër, at the idadi of Manastir and at the Mekteb-i Mülkiye in Istanbul. He underwent his administrative training in Thessaloniki and Istanbul between 1908 and 1910. Pogoni had studied in the Pedagogical Institute in France until 1912 and in 1927 he became General secretary of the Ministry of Public Education in Albania. In 1928 he elaborated the law on the organization of the education. In 1939 he was Minister of Education in the Albanian government under Italy and a member of the Council of State. He had two sons with his wife Hafsa Lamlika; they were Durim Pogoni and Bardhyl Pogoni, born in Tirana. He could speak, read and write in Turkish, French, Albanian, and Greek.
