= Mehmet Tahsini =

Albanian politician

Mehmet Tahsini (1864–?) was an Albanian politician, active in the Ottoman Empire and Albania.

He was born in Gjirokastër and started his career as a professor of History in Edirne. After 1895 he served as kaymakam in Eastern Anatolia.
