= Ethnographic Museum of Gjirokastër =

Museum in Gjirokastër, Albania

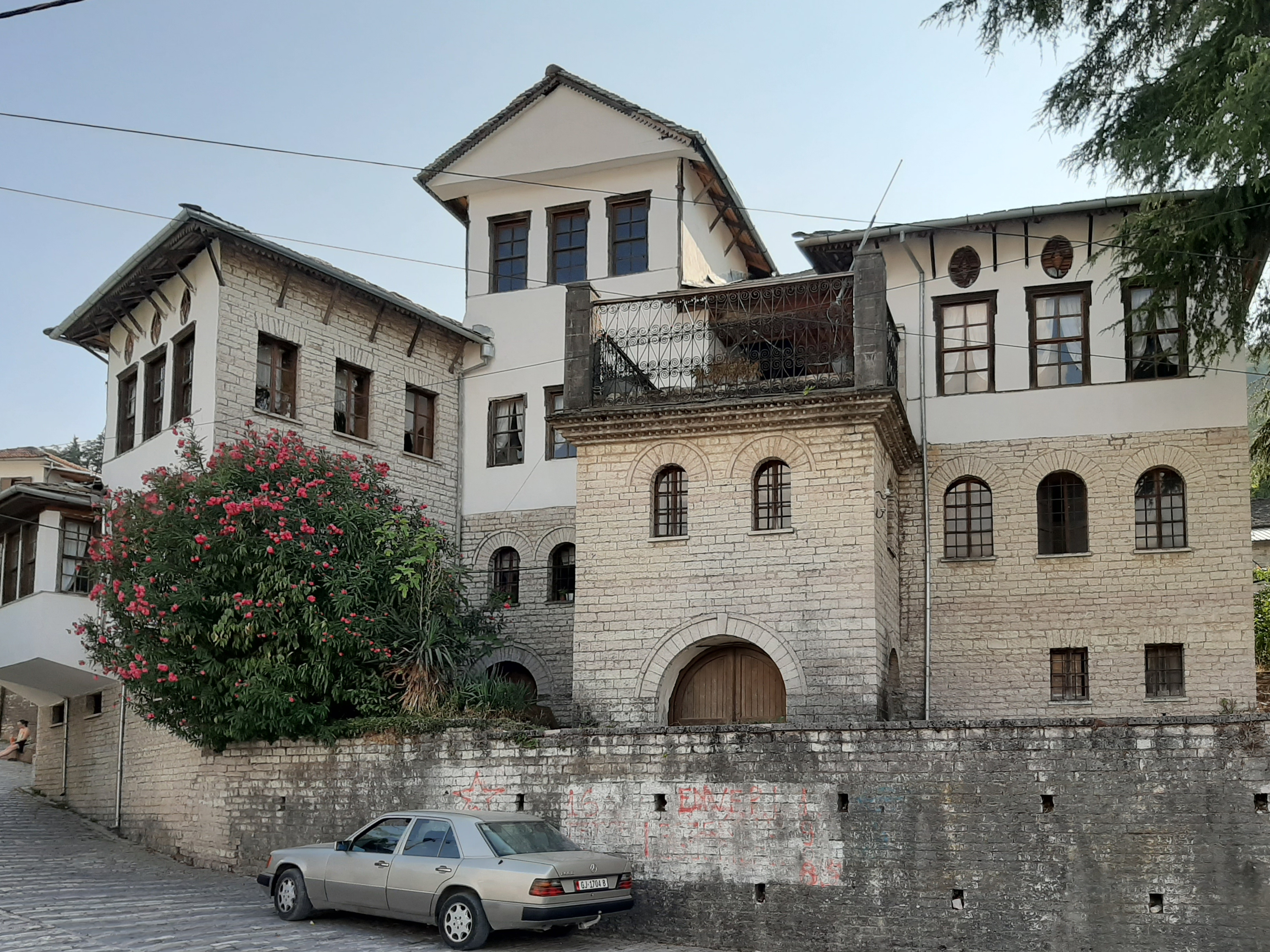

- Location within Albania
- Established: 1966; 60 years ago
- Location: Gjirokastër, Albania
- Coordinates: 40°4′32″N 20°8′5″E

Gjirokastër Ethnographic Museum (Albanian: Muzeu Etnografik i Gjirokastrës) is a museum in western Gjirokastër, Albania. The museum, constructed in 1966, is built on the site of communist leader Enver Hoxha's birth home and offers an insight into the traditional lifestyle of the town. From 1966 to 1991, the building served as the Anti-Fascist Museum, but after the fall of socialism in Albania it was converted to house cultural artefacts and traditional homewares. The museum is open year-round to visitors.
