= Mahmud Xhelaledini =

Albanian politician

- Born: 1870; Gjirokastër, Ottoman Empire (modern Albania)
- Occupation: Politician

Mahmud Xhelaledini was a 20th-century Albanian politician who worked for the Ottoman Empire.

Born in Gjirokastër in 1870, Xhelaledin had studied in Thessaloniki. After undergoing the Ottoman school of public administration there, he became kaymakam of Gjilan in the vilayet of Kosovo in the 1901-1903 period. During 1904-1912 he instead had different posts at the Thessaloniki vilayet.
