= Ali Alizoti =

Albanian politician

Ali Nezvad Alizoti (1858–???? in Gjirokastër), son of Bey Naim Alizoti, was an Albanian politician of the late nineteenth and early twentieth century. He studied in Istanbul and commenced administrative training in Salonica. In 1906 he was appointed Mutasarrıf of Hinis.
