= Mehmed Kalakula =

Albanian politician

Mehmed Rasim Kalakula was an Albanian politician who served the Ottoman Empire in the late 19th century as kaymakam of Western Anatolia.
