= Gjirokastër District =

Defunct (2000) Albanian administrative area

Gjirokastër District Rrethi i Gjirokastrës
- Former district
- Coordinates: 40°4′N 20°12′E
- Country: Albania
- Dissolved: 2000
- Seat: Gjirokastër

Area
  - Total: 1,137 km^{2} (439 sq mi)

Population (2001)
  - Total: 55,991
  - Density: 49.24/km^{2} (127.5/sq mi)
- Time zone: UTC+1 (CET)
  - Summer (DST): UTC+2 (CEST)

Gjirokastër District (Albanian: Rrethi i Gjirokastrës) was one of the 36 districts of Albania, which were dissolved in July 2000 and replaced by 12 counties. It had a population of 55,991 in 2001, and an area of 1,137 km^{2} (439 sq mi). It contained a large Greek ethnic minority. It is in the south of the country, and its capital was the city of Gjirokastër. Its territory is now part of Gjirokastër County: the municipalities of Gjirokastër, Dropull and Libohovë.

== Administrative divisions ==
The district consisted of the following municipalities:

- Antigonë
- Cepo
- Dropull i Poshtëm
- Dropull i Sipërm
- Gjirokastër
- Lazarat
- Libohovë
- Lunxhëri
- Odrie
- Picar
- Pogon
- Qendër Libohovë
- Zagori

== Villages of Gjirokastër ==
- Andon Poci
- Asim Zenel
- Bularat
- Cepos
- Derviçan
- Erind
- Frashtan
- Fushë-Bardhë
- Gerhot
- Golem (Gjirokastër)
- Goranxi
- Jergucat
- Kolonjë^{1}
- Kardhiq
- Krioner
- Lazarat
- Labovë e Madhe
- Labovë e Kryqit
- Libohova
- Mashkullorë
- Mingul
- Nivan
- Palokastër
- Picar
- Poliçan^{2}
- Prongji
- Valare
- Vrisera
- Zhej
- Zhulat

^{1} - not to be confused with Kolonjë District
^{2} - not to be confused with Poliçan of Skrapar District

== Demographics ==
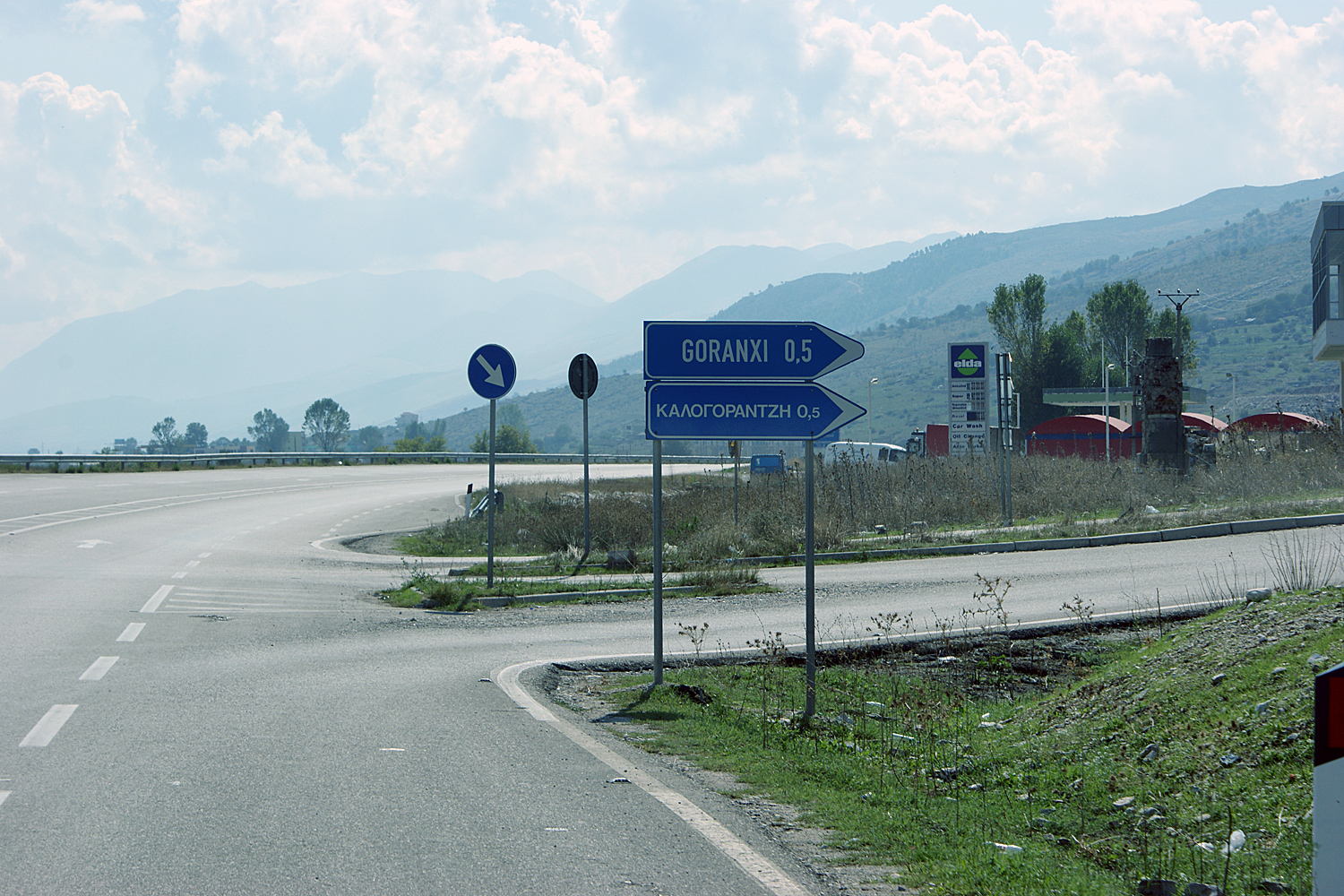
Bilingual sign in Dropull on the SH4.

In fieldwork undertaken by Greek scholar Leonidas Kallivretakis in the area during 1992, the district of Gjirokastër had 66,000 inhabitants of which 40% were Greeks, 12% Vlachs and an Orthodox Albanian population of 21%. These communities are Orthodox and collectively made up 73% of the district's Christian population while the remaining 28% of the population were Muslim Albanians. Overall the Greek community was the most numerous ethno-religious group (40%), while Albanians, irrespective of religious background, in 1992 were a plurality and collectively consisted 49% of the district's total population. Within Gjirokastër district, Greeks populate all the settlements of both former municipalities of Dropull i Sipërm and Dropull i Poshtëm and also all settlements of Pogon municipality (except the village of Selckë). Gjirokastër has a mixed population consisting of Muslim Albanians, Greeks and an Orthodox Albanian population while the city in 1992 had an overall Albanian majority.
