= St. Paraskevi's Church, Selckë =

Cultural monument of Albania

St. Paraskevi's Church
- Kisha e Shën Premtes (Albanian)
- Location: Selckë

Cultural Monument of Albania

St. Paraskevi's Church (Albanian: Kisha e Shën Premtes) is a church in Selckë, Gjirokastër County, Albania. It became a Cultural Monument of Albania in 1970.
