= Holy Transfiguration Monastery Church, Çatistë =

Cultural monument of Albania

Holy Transfiguration Monastery Church
- Kisha e Manastirit të Shpërfytyrimit (Albanian)
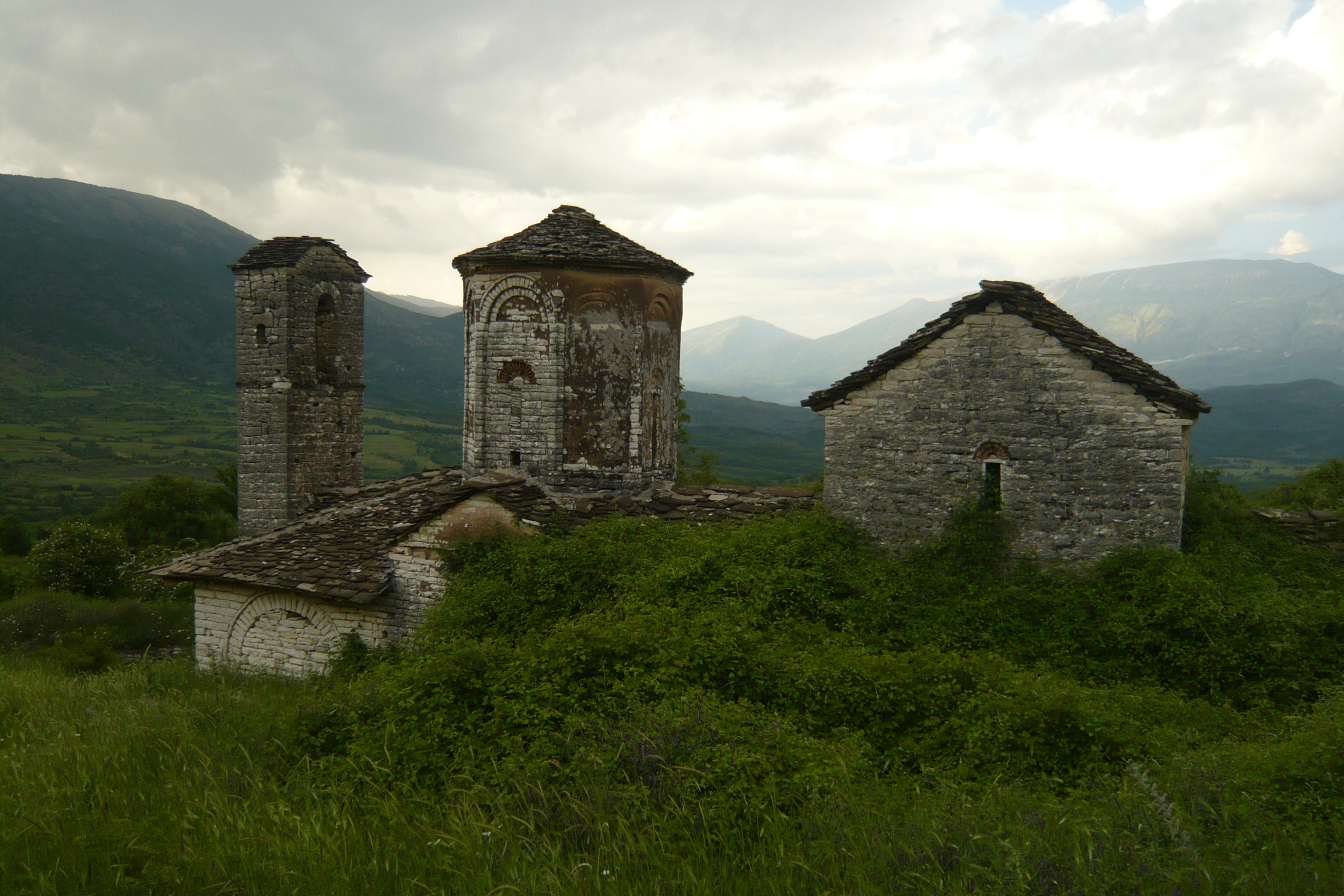
- Interactive map of Holy Transfiguration Monastery Church
- 40.0271°N 20.3633°E
- Location: Çatistë

Cultural Monument of Albania

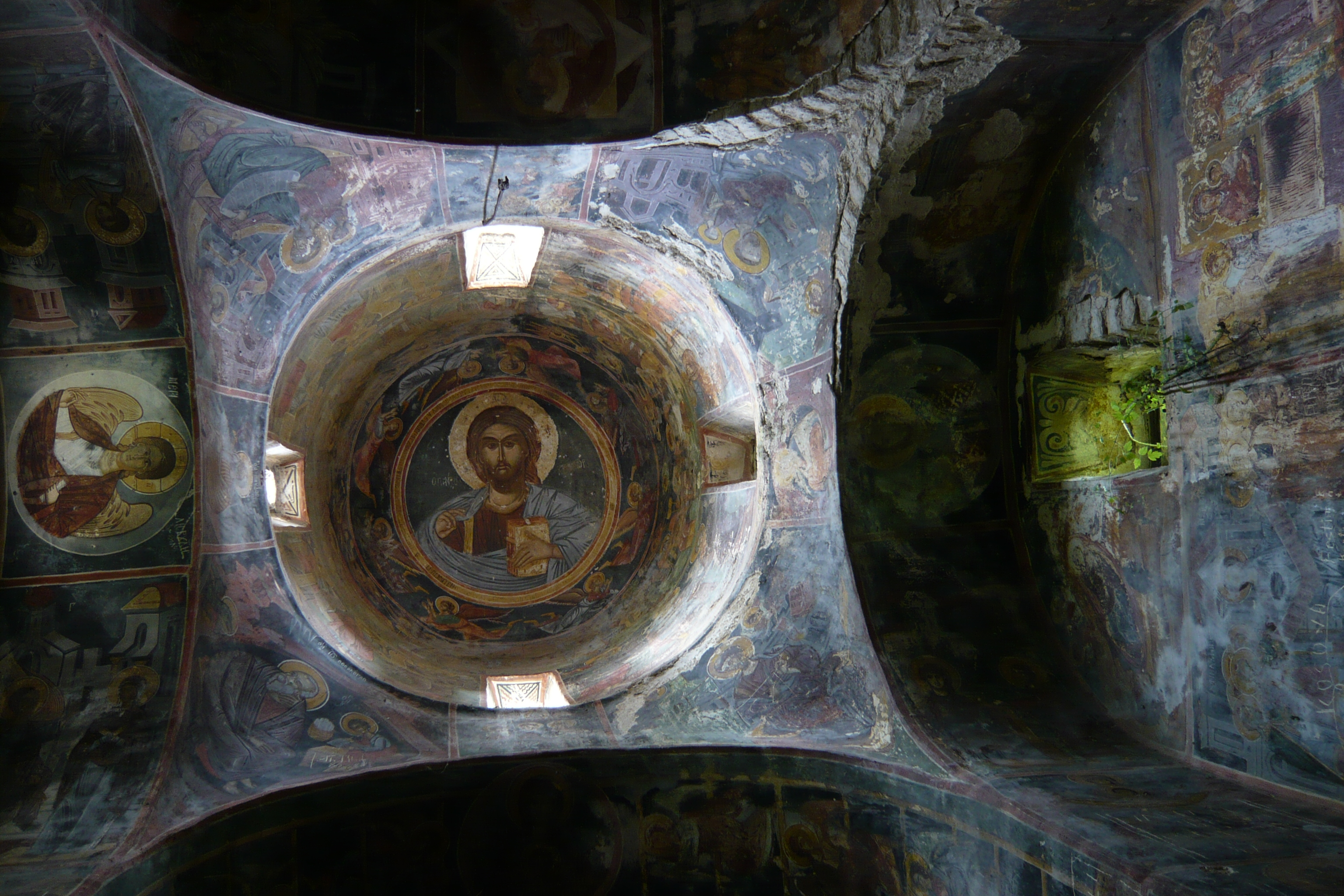
Murals inside the church.

The Holy Transfiguration Monastery Church (Albanian: Kisha e Manastirit të Shpërfytyrimit) is a monastery church near Çatistë, Gjirokastër County, Albania. It is a Cultural Monument of Albania.
