= Nexhip Alpan =

Turkish albanologist (1920–2003)

Nexhip Alpan (1920–2003), also known as Necip Alpan in Turkish, was a multifaceted figure who made contributions in various fields, including Albanology, pedagogy, educational activities, journalism, and science.

== Biography ==
Nexhip Alpan was born in the village of Zhulat in Gjirokastër, Albania, and received his primary education in his hometown and in Gjirokastër. In 1930, after the death of his mother, he moved with his family to Turkey, where he continued his education.

Alpan completed his primary schooling in Soke and secondary education in Aydin in 1938. He then attended the Istanbul Normal School, graduating in 1942, and the Higher Pedagogical Linguistic Institute in Ankara. In the 1957/58 school year, he continued his philological and psycho-pedagogical studies at the Sorbonne University in Paris.

After completing his studies at the Higher Pedagogical Institute in Ankara, Alpan initially worked as a teacher in Soke (1945–1950), and later as a professor of psycho-pedagogy at the Kastamonu Normal School (1952–1954). He also served as a professor at the "Gazi" Pedagogical Institute in Ankara, an education inspector in Izmir, and an advisor at the Ministry of Education in Turkey.

Nexhip Alpan published several pedagogical-cultural organs, such as "Imbat" and "Ogretmen", and was the editor of the official educational journal. He wrote and published hundreds of papers and articles in magazines and newspapers in Turkey, the United States, Tirana, and Pristina.

Alpan was a member of many professional, scientific, and cultural organizations and associations. He was also an Albanian-speaking broadcaster on "The Voice of Turkiye" radio, where he distributed news and programs in the Albanian language. His long-standing contributions to education and his studies in pedagogy and psychology made him a distinguished figure in the history of Turkish and Albanian education and pedagogical thought, especially among the Albanian diaspora.

In addition to his numerous contributions, Alpan was honored with many awards and recognitions for his work. He was included in the encyclopedia "Günümüz Türkiye'sinde Kim Kimdir?". As a member of various institutions, he conducted in-depth research in the fields of Albanian folklore and ethnography.

With a rich career and contributions to the fields of education, culture, and Albanology, he remains an important and inspiring figure for Albanians around the world.

== Publications ==
- “Teknika e inspektimit objektiv” (The Technique of Objective Inspection), 1957
- “Vetëkontrolli i mësuesve” (Self-Control of Teachers), 1957
- “Pesëdhjetë vjetori i 28 Nandorit Shqiptar” (The Fiftieth Anniversary of the Albanian November 28), 1962
- “Shqipëria e sotme në dritën e historisë” (Today's Albania in the Light of History), 1975
- “Lidhja e Prizrenit dhe shqiptarët” (The League of Prizren and the Albanians), 1978
- “Si ka lindur alfabeti shqiptar” (How the Albanian Alphabet Was Born), 1979
- “Edukata popullore bazë e edukimit kombëtar” (Folk education as the basis of national education), 1982
- “Pavarësia e Shqipërisë dhe Ismail Qemal Vlora” (The Independence of Albania and Ismail Qemal Vlora), 1982
- “Besa shqiptare” (The Albanian Besa), 1987
- “Epopeja e Kosovës” (The Epic of Kosovo), 1989
- "Jonuz Emre: Poet dhe edukator i madh popullor" (Jonuz Emre: Great folk poet and educator), 1999
- "Zhulati legjendar: Në kujtimet e mia" (The legendary Zhulat: In my memories), 2015 OCLC 1391810871

== See also ==
- Albanians in Turkey
- List of Albanians of Turkey
