= Pandeli Sotiri =

Albanian writer

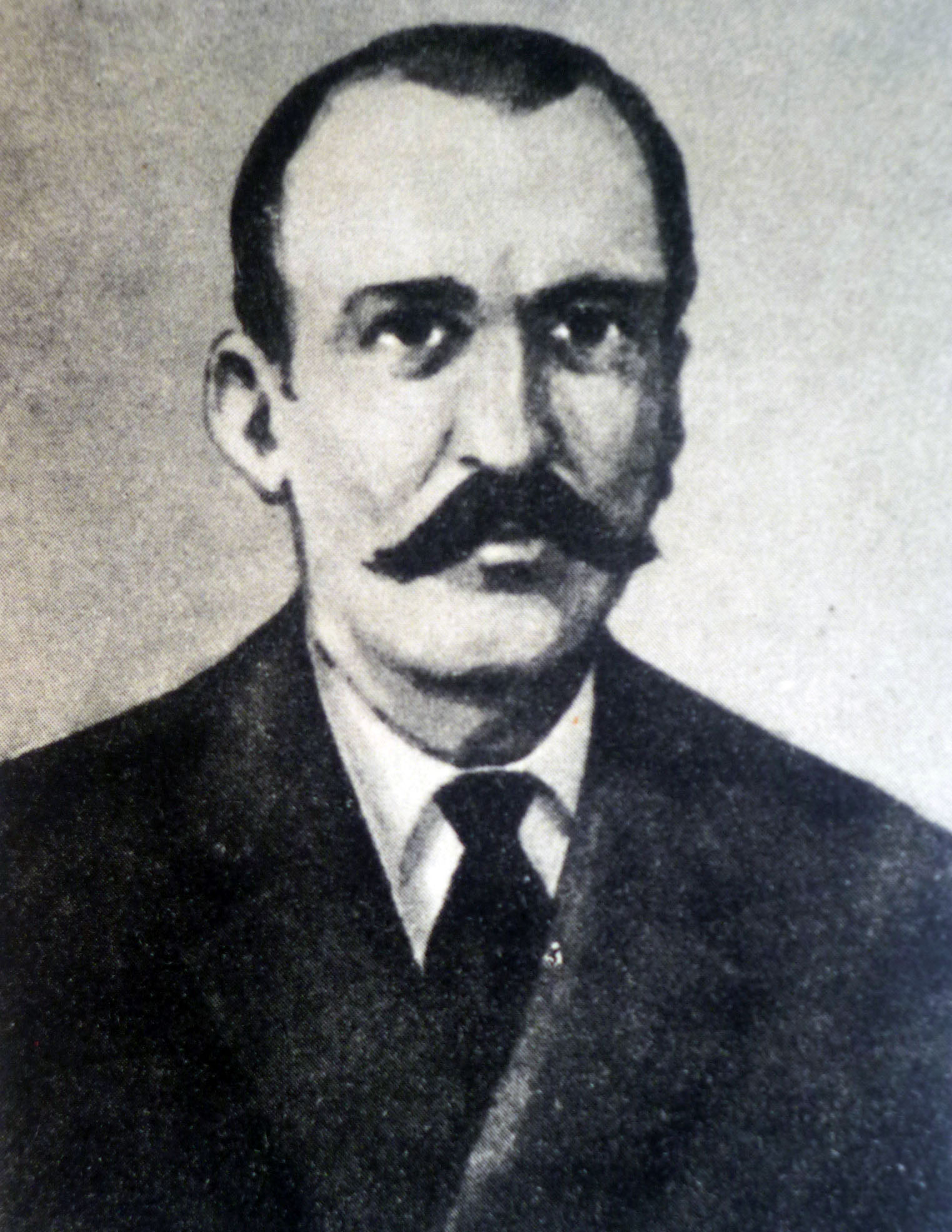
- Born: 1843; Selckë, Pogon, Gjirokaster County, Albania (then Ottoman Empire)
- Died: 1892 (aged 48–49); Istanbul, Ottoman Empire
- Occupations: Mayor in the Austria-Hungarian Army, Doctor, Teacher, Publisher
- Writing career
- Period: 1872–1892
- Literary movement: Albanian National Revival

Pandeli Sotiri (1842–1892) was a teacher who acted as director of the first Albanian school of modern times in Korçë. Sotiri was one of the most important Rilindas figures that contributed in the propagation of the Albanian language. He also worked on one of the versions of the Albanian alphabet. The Congress of Monastir based Albanian's alphabet mostly on Sotiri's precedent work.

== Biography ==
Sotiri was born in 1843 in the village of Selckë in the Lunxhëri region, Janina Vilayet of Ottoman Empire (now Pogon municipality, Gjirokastër District, Albania) . Along with Petro Nini Luarasi he was an alumnus at the Greek teacher seminary in Qestorati, Gjirokastër, where Koto Hoxhi secretly taught in Albanian and inculcated Albanian nationalistic ideals to his students.

Sotiri was part of the Central Committee for Defending Albanian Rights created in Istanbul in 1877, and its branch Society for the Publication of Albanian Writings (Albanian: Shoqëri e të shtypurit shkronjavet shqip), Istanbul, 12 October 1879.

In 1884 he took over the publishing of the first magazine entirely written in Albanian, the magazine Drita, which had first been published by Petro Poga. However Sotiri had to issue a new permit and to change the name of the magazine into Dituria (meaning "knowledge" in English).

In early 1887 Sotiri was issued the permit to open the first Albanian school of modern times in Korçë. On March 7, 1887 the school (Albanian: Mësonjëtorja) opened in the building offered by the Terpo brothers, an Albanian patriotic family.

He had married a Greek woman, the niece of an archbishop of the Greek Orthodox Church and had to leave the city for Greece that same year. As a result, the Mësonjëtorja was left in the hands of Thanas Sina and Petro Nini Luarasi.

Sotiri died in 1892 allegedly killed by Greek Orthodox fanatics who threw him from the third floor of his apartment in Thessaloniki, Greece, with his wife and father-in-law being the organizers.
