= Qendër Libohovë =

- Administrative unit
- Location within Albania
- Coordinates: 40°4′N 20°16′E
- Country: Albania
- County: Gjirokastër
- Municipality: Libohovë

Population (2011)
  - Administrative unit: 1,264
- Time zone: UTC+1 (CET)
  - Summer (DST): UTC+2 (CEST)

Qendër Libohovë is a former municipality in the Gjirokastër County, southern Albania. At the 2015 local government reform it became a subdivision of the municipality Libohovë.

The population at the 2011 census was 1,264.

The municipal unit consists of the villages Labovë e Sipërme, Labovë e Poshtme (together also referred to as Labovë e Kryqit), Suhë, Stegopull, Bulo, Drino and Nepravishtë. An important cultural, religious and historical monument in the municipality St. Mary's Church, Labovë e Kryqit.The church seen today is essentially a creation of the 13th century at the time of the Despots of Epirus. However, an original foundation may go back to AD 527-565 during the reign of Emperor Justinian.

== Notable people ==
- Behxhet Nepravishta
