= Skore =

Albanian village

Skore Σχωριάδες
- Village
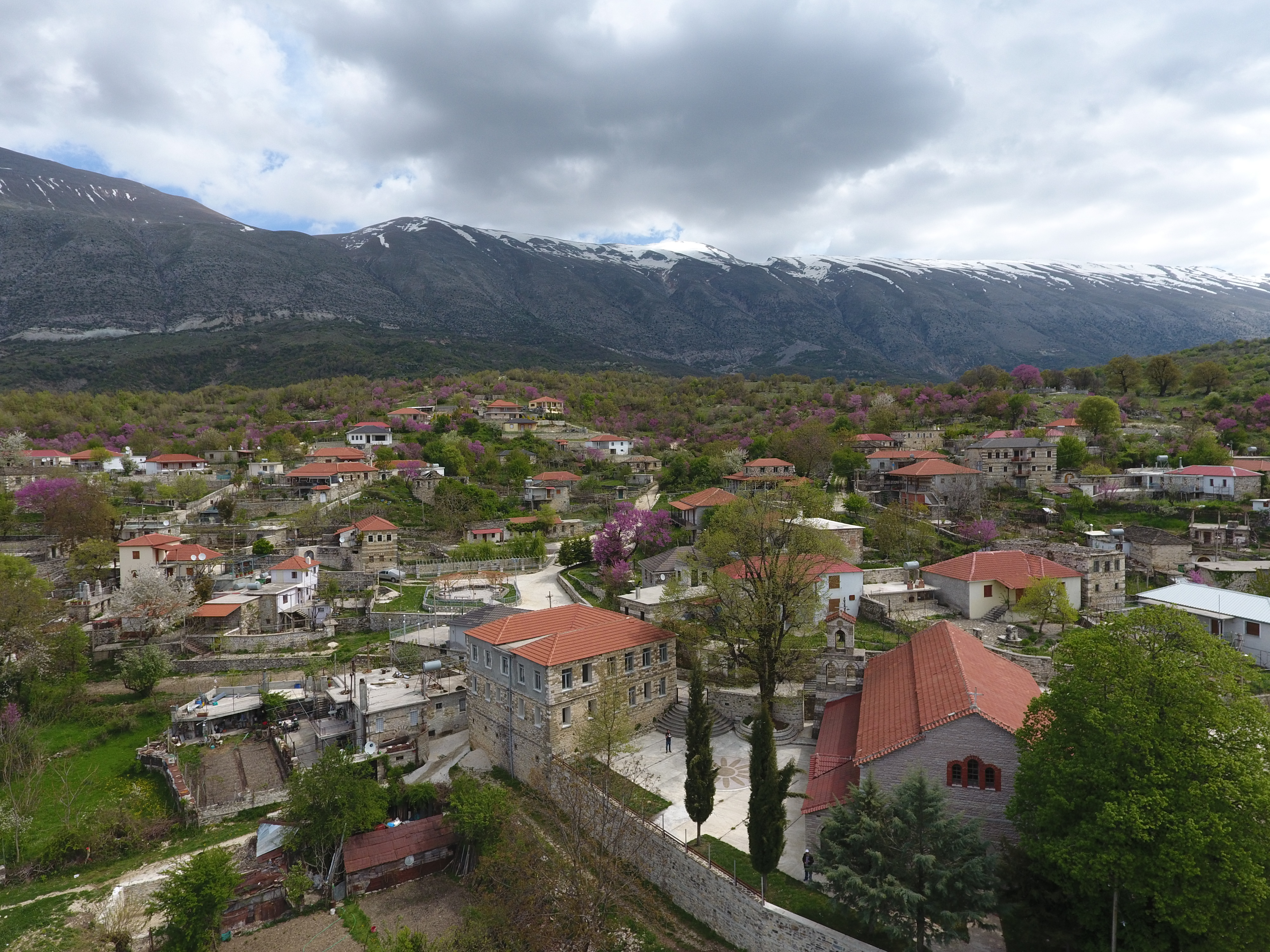

- Location within Albania
- Coordinates: 40°6′N 20°22′E
- Country: Albania
- County: Gjirokastër
- Municipality: Dropull
- Administrative unit: Pogon
- Time zone: UTC+1 (CET)
  - Summer (DST): UTC+2 (CEST)
- Postal Code: 6007

Skore (Albanian definite form: Skoreja, Greek: Σχωριάδες) is one of the six villages of the former commune of Pogon, in southern Albania. At the 2015 local government reform it became part of the municipality Dropull.

== Name ==
In 1431 the toponym is listed as Uskoroyadis. Linguist Yordan Zaimov reconstructs the form as Сковради, Skorovadi and derives it from Old Slavic, from сковрада, Skorovada meaning 'coal pan; pan' and Ylli writes is not supported by the oldest evidence of the name. He states an adjectival formation, сковрада+-уд, Skorovada+-ud would have yielded Скоражда, Skorazhda and no reliable basic form can be reconstructed from the oldest evidence.

The name may be related to Bulgarian скоро ядещ, skoro yadesh as a term for 'someone who eats quickly'. Ylli writes a formation from a personal name Скоро, Skoro and a family name is also possible, but the second part would be unclear. In both cases, only the first part is preserved in the present form.

== Demographics ==
Skore is a Greek speaking village. Inhabitants are Christians and the population was 394 in 1992. According to a 2014 report by the Albanian government, there were 492 Greeks in the village. Inhabitants who migrated from Skore went to Rafina in Greece.

== Notable people ==
- Nikolaos Kalyvas (1898/1900 - 1944), Greek trade unionist and deputy minister of Labour during the Axis occupation of Greece, killed by OPLA.

== See also ==
- Greeks in Albania
