= Fushëbardhë =

- Village
- Location within Albania
- Coordinates: 40°6′N 20°0′E
- Country: Albania
- County: Gjirokastër
- Municipality: Gjirokastër
- Administrative unit: Cepo
- Time zone: UTC+1 (CET)
  - Summer (DST): UTC+2 (CEST)

Fushëbardhë (also Fushë-Bardhë) is a small village in the south of Albania near Gjirokastër. It is part of the former municipality Cepo. At the 2015 local government reform it became part of the municipality Gjirokastër. Papa Zhuli a Catholic priest who is credited for the Kanun of Labëria, is from the neighbouring village of Zhulat and also Fushëbardhë. He moved from this region of now Cepo to Labëria, where he founded his Kanun. The etymology of Fushëbardhë from the Albanian language translates to in English as “White field”.

== Notable people ==
- Adil Çarçani (1922–1997) (former Prime Minister of Albania)
