= Humelicë =

Humelicë Humelica, Hmelice
- Village
- Location within Albania
- Coordinates: 40°09′45″N 20°04′37″E
- Country: Albania
- County: Gjirokastër
- Municipality: Gjirokastër
- Administrative unit: Cepo
- Elevation: 200 m (660 ft)
- Time zone: UTC+1 (CET)
  - Summer (DST): UTC+2 (CEST)

Humelicë (Aromanian: Humelica or Humelice) is a village in Gjirokastër County, southern Albania. At the 2015 local government reform it became part of the municipality of Gjirokastër. It is inhabited by an Orthodox Christian population of Aromanians with a minority of Orthodox Christian Albanians.

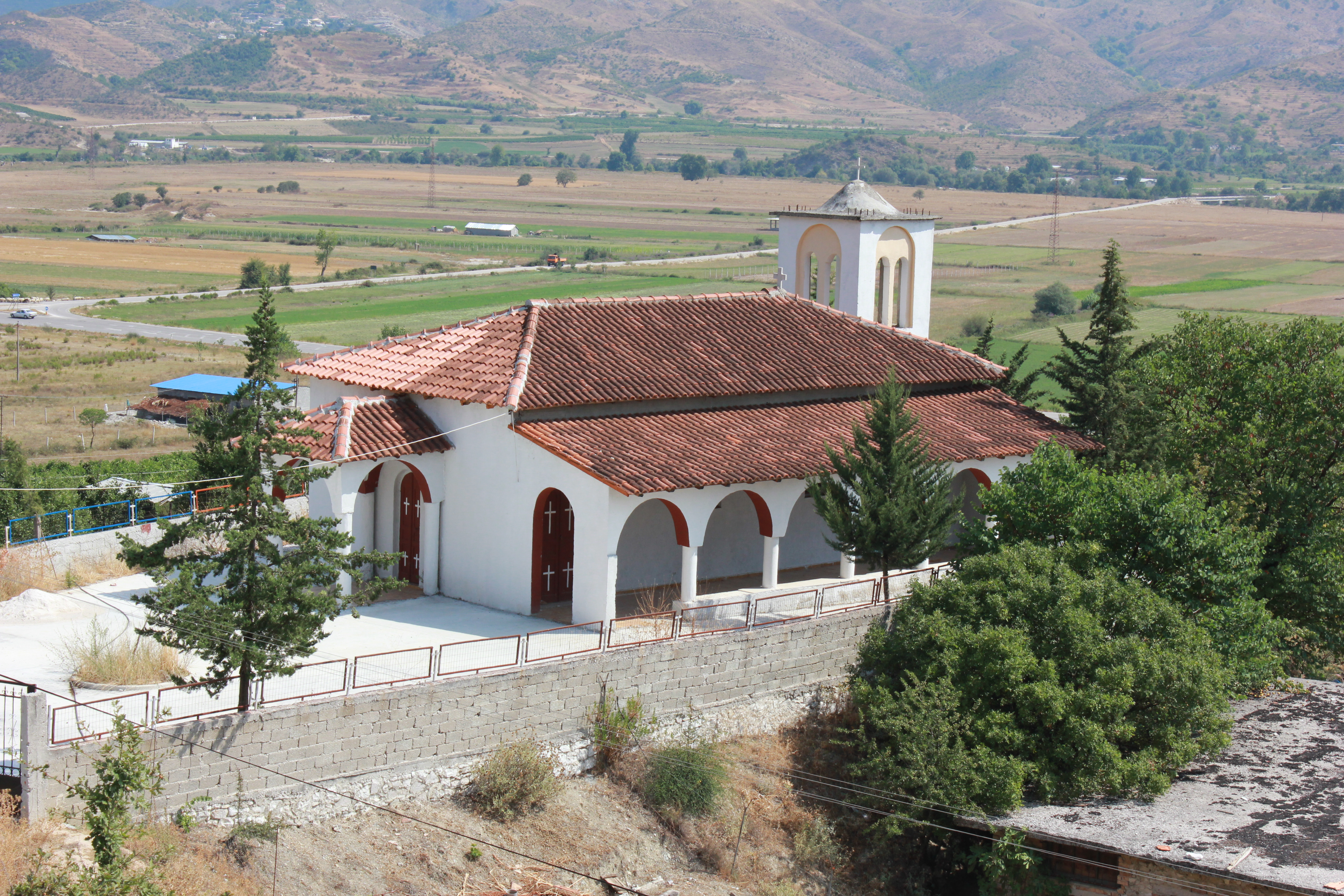
The Church of Saint Nicholas in Humelice

== Demographics ==
According to Ottoman statistics, the village had 97 inhabitants in 1895. The village had 412 inhabitants in 1993, of which majority were Orthodox Aromanians and the rest were Christian Albanians. The village today has a decreased permanent population of roughly 200 inhabitants, notably due to migration to Greece or other countries. Despite this, the population doubles in Easter, Summer and Christmas, as most people return to their village to celebrate or have holidays with their families.
