= Sophianos of Dryinoupolis =

Greek bishop

Bishop Sophianos of Dryinoupolis (died 1711) was a Greek religious figure and Orthodox missionary in Ottoman Epirus around the turn of the 18th century.

== Biography ==
He was probably born in the village of Poliçan, in the Pogon region.

At the time he became Bishop of Dryinoupolis (modern southwest Albania) the religious composition of the region was changing due to massive conversions to Islam.

In 1672 he founded a Greek school in the local monastery of Saint Athanasios. In recognition of the danger that Christianity was shrinking, Sophianos resigned his bishopric and became a wandering missionary, preaching from village to village.

Sophianos' last days were spent in the monastery of Saint Athanasios in his hometown Poliçan, where he taught religion and letters to the village children. Because of his pious character he was respected and honored by both Christians and Muslims. As a missionary, Sophianos is considered the forerunner of Cosmas of Aetolia in the region.

Bishop Sophianos died on 26 November 1711 AD. Although uncanonized, he is considered a saint in his village.
