= Paleokastra Castle =

Castle in southern Albania

Coordinates: 40°09′50″N 20°05′52″E

Aerial view of the castra

The Paleokastra Castle is a castle built during late antiquity, located around 13 kilometres (8.1 mi) north of Gjirokastra in the village of Palokastër, in southern Albania. It lies on a river terrace at the confluence between Drino and Kardhiq rivers and occupies a surface area of around 1 hectare (2.5 acres).

== History ==
The castle was built in the late 3rd or early 4th century AD. It was built in a strategic location, easily defendable through the two rivers surrounding it. It was part of a set of castles to secure the Drino valley. It was, however, destroyed soon thereafter by the Goths in 378 AD. The castle was rebuilt thereafter together with 2 churches. It was inhabited until around the 6th century AD. The castle was excavated between 1971 and 1976.

== Structure ==
The walls can be grouped into the two building periods mentioned above.

=== First building period (late 3rd – early 4th century AD) ===
The first period, which lies around 300 AD, is classified by old stones recycled from antique buildings. The wall was around 8 metres high and 2.3 metres wide. Today's remnants reach around 3 m height. Part of this first construction period is also an army barrack which was found beneath the foundations of a basilica of the 5th century AD. Two inscriptions of approximately 311–313 AD and 324–337 AD were found during the excavations. They were made by two praesides of the province of Epirus Vetus, Valerius Cassianus and Julius Lepidus, and were dedicated to the emperors Licinius and Constans II. This is seen as a proof that the construction of the castle lay in the hands of the provincial government.

=== Second building period (5th–6th centuries AD) ===
The second period is classified by a mix of limestone and bricks as building materials. The castle has 12 square towers and two round towers on the corners. The side of the castle that faces the Drino does not have any towers at all. The main gate of the castle lies on the western side and is roughly 2.9 m wide. The castle also has two minor gates which lie in the north and right next to the Drino in the east.

=== Sacral buildings ===
The ruins of two churches were excavated in the 1970s. one lies inside the castle walls and dates to the 5th century AD. It is a three-nave basilica. The middle nave measures 13 × 5.3 m, and the two side naves are 2.15 m and 2.49 m wide. The second church was built outside the castle walls and lies to the south of it. It is a single-nave basilica to which side naves were added later on. The church was paved with bricks and had frescos on its walls.
