= Behxhet Nepravishta =

Albanian politician

- Born: 1867; Nepravishtë, Vilayet of Yanina, Ottoman Empire
- Died: 1916 (aged 48–49)
- Occupation: politician

Behxhet Nepravishta (1867–1916) was an Albanian politician who served the Ottoman Empire in the late 19th century and the newly founded state of Albania in the beginning of the 20th century. Born in the village of Nepravishtë near Libohovë in 1867, he was firstly a teacher in Muslim schools of Thessaloniki, Ioannina, and Hama. Later he was appointed Kaymakam in Yemen, Alasonia, and Western Anatolia.

Transferred to Istanbul in 1910, he was appointed inspector of the civil service in 1911. Soon after the National Declaration of the Albanian Independence, he went to Albania in 1913. He became prefect of the districts of Berat and Durrës in 1914–1915. He went to the United States in 1916 to collect funds for the Cham Albanians expelled from Greece. During his return (through Sarajevo), his plane crashed and he died in the accident.
