= Dormition Church, Labovë e Kryqit =

Byzantine-era Albanian Orthodox church

Dormition of the Theotokos Church
- Kisha e Fjetjes së Virgjëreshës
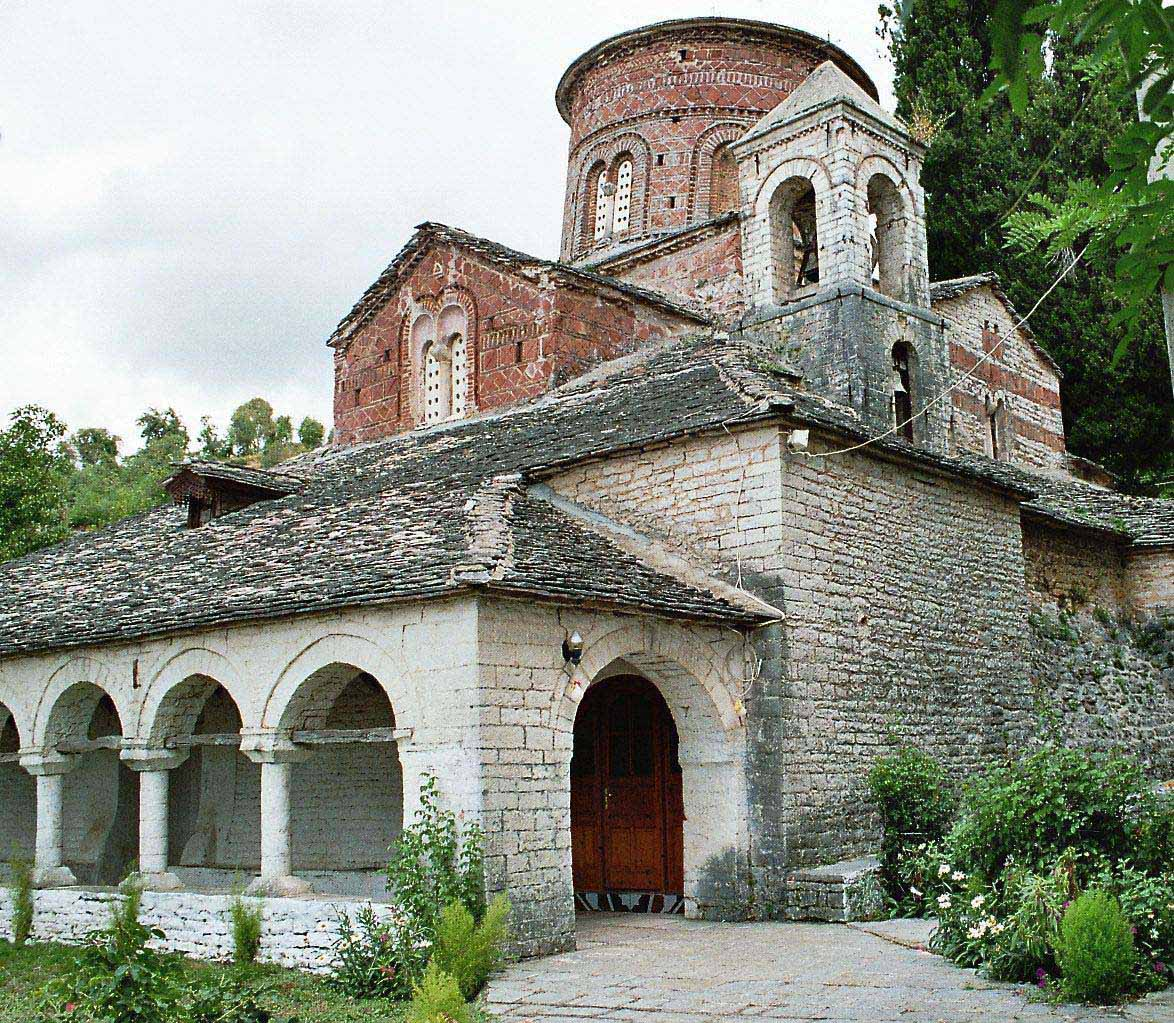

Religion
- Affiliation: Eastern Orthodox

Location
- Location: Labovë e Kryqit, Albania
- Interactive map of Dormition of the Theotokos Church
- Coordinates: 40.0739°N 20.2902°E

Architecture
- Type: Church
- Style: Middle Byzantine (circular dome with peristoon)
- Founder: Justinian I
- Cultural Monument of Albania

The Dormition of the Theotokos Church (Albanian: Kisha e Fjetjes së Virgjëreshës), simply known as St. Mary church, is a Byzantine-era, now Albanian Orthodox church in the village of Labovë e Kryqit, in Gjirokastër County, southern Albania. It is one of the most representative examples of Byzantine architecture in Albania.

== History ==
The foundation of the church dates back to 6th century at the reign of Byzantine Emperor Justinian (527–565 AD). Justinian erected the church in memory of his mother. The present building dates from the 10th century or – according to another source – 13th century, during the time of the Despotate of Epirus.

The church retained a fragment of the True Cross due to a donation by the Byzantine Emperor. According to another tradition, the Byzantine Emperor donated the miracle-working icon of the Virgin Labovitissa. Until 1967, it was a pilgrimage destination for the surrounding Christian communities. Each year on the day of the Dormition of the Mother of God a procession of the Holy Cross fragment with the Labovitissa icon took place to the adjacent villages. In 1967, religious activities were forbidden by the atheistic policies of the People's Republic of Albania. A number of initiatives to revive such festivities have had limited results. The relic was lost in 1989. According to claims in the Albanian press, it was stolen by the daughter of Enver Hoxha, former head of the People's Republic of Albania.

The church has been declared a Cultural Monument of Albania. Today, it is considered one of the most significant examples of Byzantine architecture in Albania.

== Architecture ==
The church shares a number of typical features of 9th–11th century Byzantine architecture. The connection of the central aisle to the subsidiary aisles as well as the narthex is ensured through a triple passage (tribilon).

Several architectural elements found at the exterior of the building, such as the dome, the windows and the combination of brick- and stonework, are influenced from contemporary Byzantine churches in western Macedonia. The 10th-century dome is the oldest example of circular dome found in the region of Epirus, probably an evolution of the older octagonal style. The fishbone pattern of the exterior is also found in a number of contemporary church buildings in Epirus, western Macedonia and Lakonia, in Greece, although not a quite common feature in Byzantine architecture in general.

== See also ==
- Orthodox Autocephalous Church of Albania

== Sources ==
- Eade, John; Katic, Mario (2014). Pilgrimage, politics and place-making in Eastern Europe : crossing the borders. Ashgate Publishing. ISBN 9781472415929.
- Veikou, Myrto (2012). Byzantine Epirus: A Topography of Transformation. Settlements of the Seventh-Twelfth Centuries in Southern Epirus and Aetoloacarnania, Greece. Leiden: BRILL. ISBN 9789004227460.
