= Poliçan, Dropull =

Poliçan Πολύτσανη
- Village
- Location within Albania
- Coordinates: 40°7′53″N 20°21′2″E
- Country: Albania
- County: Gjirokastër
- Municipality: Dropull
- Administrative unit: Pogon
- Time zone: UTC+1 (CET)
  - Summer (DST): UTC+2 (CEST)
- Postal Code: 6007

Poliçan (Greek: Πολύτσανη, romanized: Polytsani) is a village in Gjirokastër County, southern Albania. At the 2015 local government reform it became part of the municipality Dropull. It is within the wider Pogoni region that stretches in both Greece and Albania. Poliçan was the municipal center of the former Pogon commune in Albania. It is nicknamed "the Bride of the Pogoni region" and is inhabited by ethnic Greeks.

== History ==
=== Antiquity and Byzantine period ===
In classical antiquity the region was inhabited by the Chaonians, one of the three major Greek tribes that inhabited ancient Epirus. Polican was identified with the Chaonian settlement Politeiani (Greek: Πολιτειανή) also known as Polyani (Greek: Πολυανή). The name appears to be borrowed from the nearby mountain Polyainos. Ancient coins depicting Alexander the Great have been unearthed in Poliçan.

The ancient name has changed to the present form (Polyts(i)ani) during the Slavic invasion (7th-8th century). In the late Byzantine period (11th-15th century) two Christian Orthodox monasteries were erected next to Polican. After the Fall of Constantinople in the Fourth Crusade (1204), Polican became part of the Greek Despotate of Epirus and refuge for various Byzantine noble families.

=== Ottoman period ===
At the period of Ottoman occupation, that started in mid-15th century, Polican enjoyed a privileged semi-autonomous status which led to economic and cultural flourishing. The settlement was included in the Koinon of Zagori, although geographically it was not part of the Zagori region, but belonged to the Pogoni villages.

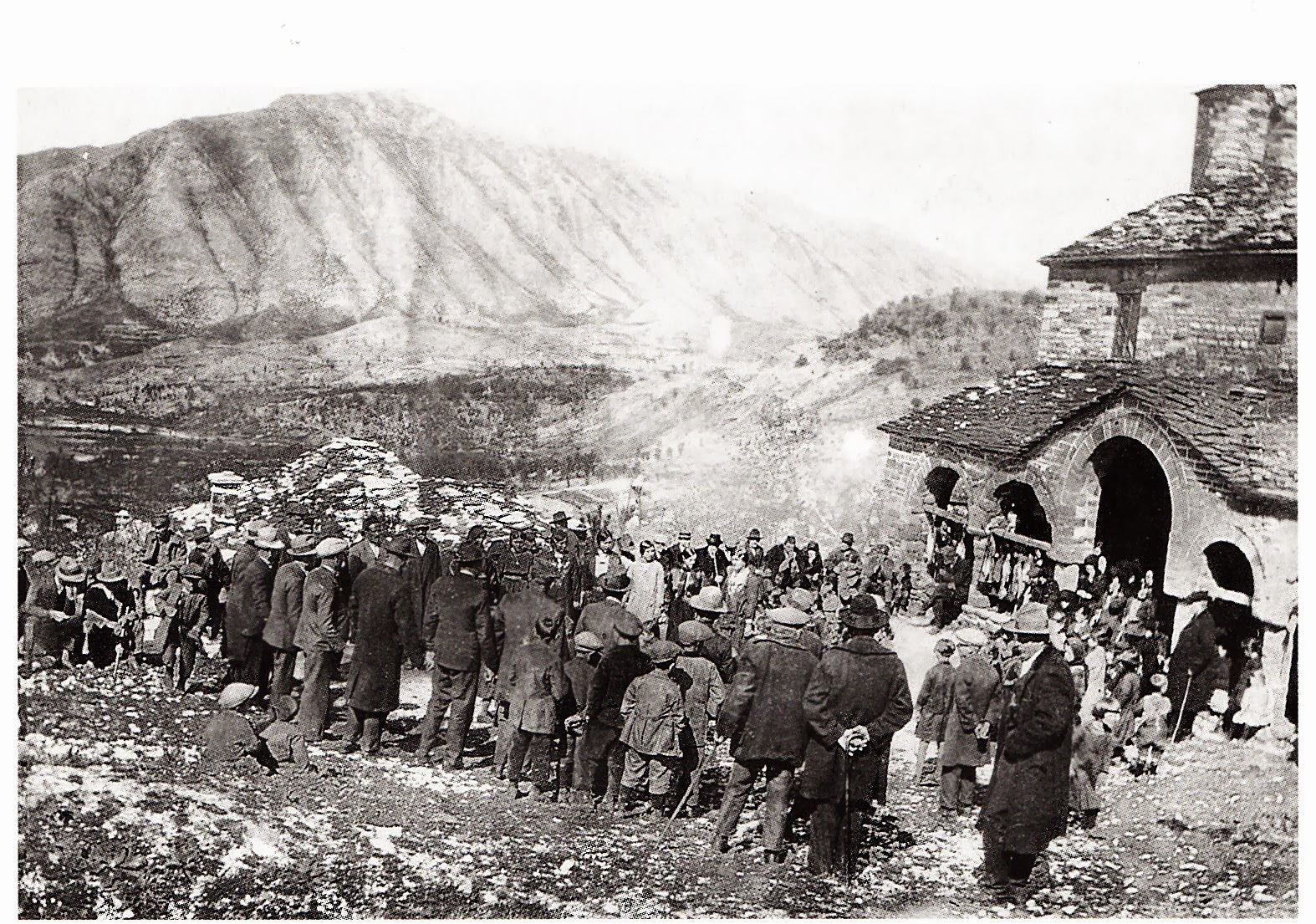
Religious festival next to the church of Saint Nicholas in Polican, 1931

In the early 16th century two significant church buildings were erected in the town: Saint Athanasius (1513) and Saint Demetrius (1526). Both of them display unique features of early post-Byzantine art. A Greek school was founded in 1672 by the local Orthodox missionary Sophianos next to the church of Saint Athanasius. The school attracted also students from the nearby regions next to Gjirokastër (Zagori and Riza).

A second school started operating in 1750, sponsored by a local businessman and benefactor. Greek education was expanded with the foundation of two secondary level schools in 1866, in addition to a boys' and a girls' school in 1866 and 1874 respectively. The local educational institutions became renowned to such a degree that their graduates were eligible for admission to any Greek college in the Ottoman capital Constantinople (Istanbul) without qualifying examinations. The schools of Polican were financed by the local community and especially by local businessmen and benefactors as well as by the town's diaspora.

=== 20th century ===
Polican and the rest of the settlements in the Pogon municipality became part of Albania in the 1920s. In 1940, when Axis Italy launched a failed invasion against Greece from Albanian territory during World War II, the town came under the control of the II Army Corps of the Greek forces. In 1941, Nazi German units invaded, and in 1944 they burnt much of the settlement.

The Greek communities that reside in Pogon have a recognized minority status by the Albanian state. A Greek elementary school is currently operating in Polican.

== Demographics ==
In 1913 the population of Polican was 1,650 (Greek census). During the interwar period it reached ca. 2,500 inhabitants that spoke Greek. but it decreased to 559 in 1989. According to a 2014 report by the Albanian government, there were 729 ethnic Greeks in the village.

== Geography and culture ==
Polican is located on the slopes of Mount Nemërçkë, 13 km (8 mi) from the Greek-Albanian border. It is the northernmost Greek speaking village within the Pogoni region, which is divided between Greece (40 villages) and Albania (7 villages).

In Polican, along with the rest of the Pogoni region, polyphonic singing is part of the local musical tradition.

== Notable people ==
- Sophianos (-1711), Greek-Orthodox bishop and scholar.

== Sources ==
- Giakoumis, Georgios (2009). Δύο Πρώιμα Μετα-Βυζαντινά Μνημεία και ο Ζωγραφικός τους Διάκοσμος στο Πωγώνι [Two Early Post-Byzantine Monuments and their Internal Environment in Pogoni] (pdf) (PhD thesis) (in Greek). University of Ioannina. doi:10.12681/eadd/25277.
- Hammond, Nicholas Geoffrey Lemprière (1967). Epirus: The Geography, the Ancient Remains, the History and Topography of Epirus and Adjacent Areas. Clarendon P.
- Koltsida, Athina (2008). Η Εκπαίδευση στη Βόρειο Ήπειρο κατά την Ύστερη Περίοδο της Οθωμανικής Αυτοκρατορίας [Education in Northern Epirus during the Latter Ottoman Period] (pdf) (PhD thesis) (in Greek). Aristotle University of Thessaloniki.
- Tziovas, Dimitris, ed. (2003). Greece and the Balkans: Identities, Perceptions and Cultural Encounters since the Enlightenment. Aldershot, England: Ashgate. ISBN 9780754609988.
- ΖΩΤΟΥ, ΜΕΝΕΛΑΟΥ; ΓΙΑΝΝΑΡΟΥ, ΧΡΙΣΤΟΦΟΡΟΥ. Η ΠΟΛΥΤΣΑΝΗ ΤΗΣ ΒΟΡΕΙΟΥ ΗΠΕΙΡΟΥ. ΕΚΔΟΣΕΙΣ, ΙΩΑΝΝΙΝΑ, 1989.
- Politsanitika Nea Newspaper, Tel. +30 210 5238058 (Greek)
