= Cepo =

Çepo
- Administrative unit
- Location within Albania
- Coordinates: 40°7′N 20°5′E
- Country: Albania
- County: Gjirokastër
- Municipality: Gjirokastër

Population (2011)
  - Total: 1,727
- Time zone: UTC+1 (CET)
  - Summer (DST): UTC+2 (CEST)
- Postal Code: 6009

Çepo is a municipal administrative units, formerly known as communes in the Gjirokastër County, southern Albania. At the 2015 local government reform it became a subdivision of the municipality Gjirokastër. The municipal unit administrative center is Palokastër village and it consists on 10 other villages which are: Fushëbardhë, Zhulat, Taroninë, Mashkullorë, Çepun, Kodër, Plesat, Kardhiq, Prongji and Humelicë.

== History ==
In 1185 the seat of the Orthodox bishopric of Dryinopolis was moved to Çepo until 1395 when it was transferred to Argyrokastron (modern Gjirokastër). In medieval times, Zhulat was the home of Papa Zhuli, as well as Fushëbardhë, he was a Catholic priest who is credited for the Kanun of Labëria. He moved there from this region.

== Demographics ==
The population at the 2011 census was 1,727, while in the civil registers of the same year the population had a total of 6,702 inhabitants. In 2018, referring to the same civil registry, the population had a slight decline, counting a total population of 6,224. The ethnic population of Çepo is Albanian, the Albanians of Çepo speak the Tosk dialect of the Albanian language. Historically speaking, Çepo had a mixed Muslim and Christian (Orthodox) population, with greater numbers of Muslims. Humelica was inhabited by a historically Christian population, Fushëbardhë and Zhulat were inhabited by historically Muslim populations, and much of the rest of the commune is of mixed historical confession. In the 2011 census, a plurality (44.72%) the population did not identify with one of Albania's four major denominations, while of the major four, Çepo had 42.79% Muslims, 9.44% Orthodox, 2.2% Bektashi, and 1.85% Catholic.
