= Prongji =

- Village
- Location within Albania
- Coordinates: 40°7′N 20°2′E
- Country: Albania
- County: Gjirokastër
- Municipality: Gjirokastër
- Administrative unit: Cepo
- Time zone: UTC+1 (CET)
  - Summer (DST): UTC+2 (CEST)

Prongji is a village of southwestern Albania, located to the northwest of the city of Gjirokastër. The village is in the administrative Gjirokastër County and part of Labëria region. It is part of the former municipality Cepo. At the 2015 local government reform it became part of the municipality Gjirokastër. The village is inhabited by Muslim Albanians and an Orthodox Albanian population. The village is situated among the mountains of Mali i Gjere and Lenik on a small tableland.
