= Pogon, Albania =

Pogon Πωγώνι
- Administrative unit
- Location within Albania
- Coordinates: 40°8′N 20°21′E
- Country: Albania
- County: Gjirokastër
- Municipality: Dropull

Area
  - Total: 177.6 km^{2} (68.6 sq mi)

Population (2011)
  - Total: 432
  - Density: 2.43/km^{2} (6.30/sq mi)
- Time zone: UTC+1 (CET)
  - Summer (DST): UTC+2 (CEST)
- Postal Code: 6007

Pogon (Albanian: Pogon or Pogoni; Greek: Πωγώνι, Pogoni), is a former commune in the Gjirokastër County, southern Albania. At the 2015 local government reform it became a subdivision of the municipality Dropull. The population at the 2011 census was 432. It consists of seven villages which are mostly Greek speaking: Poliçan; Skore; Hllomo; Sopik; Mavrojer; Çatistë and Selckë of which Poliçan is the administrative center. The administrative unit of Pogon is inhabited by Greeks.

== Demographics ==
Greek is spoken in Poliçan, Skore, Hllomo, Sopik, Mavrojer and Çatistë and those villages along with Drymades on the Greek side of the border comprise the sub-region of Paleo-Pogoni (Old Pogoni), part of the wider region of Pogoni. Traditionally Greeks of Pogoni in Albania practised endogamy by intermarrying within their group, although occasionally brides from Zagori were taught to speak Greek. Poliçan is the northernmost Greek-speaking village in the Pogoni area, as villages north west of Poliçan are Albanian-speaking, while those south of Poliçan are Greek-speaking. Selckë, part of a wider region of Lunxhëria, is traditionally inhabited by an Orthodox Albanian population as well as later Aromanian migrants, while the rest of the villages belong to the Greek minority zone.

== History ==
In 15th century Pogon came under Ottoman rule and became part of the Sanjak of Ioannina. It was a nahiya centre as "Pogun" at Pogun kaza (Its centre was Voştina) in Ergiri sanjak of Yanya Vilayet till 1912. As part of Albania, the municipality is part of the recognized Greek Minority Zone.

Historically each village of Pogon has its own variation of traditional costumes and dresses. The area is part of Pogoni, a region that also includes parts of nearby Pogoni on the Greek side of the border.

== Culture ==
The villages of Pogon (except Selckë) are part of the wider Pogoni region, which is divided between Greece (40 villages) and Albania (7 villages). Polyphonic singing, although shared among several ethnic groups, tends to be mostly identified with the Pogoni area.

== Notable people ==
- Sophianos (-1711), local Greek-Orthodox bishop and scholar.
- Pandeli Sotiri, (1842–1892) Albanian patriot, main contributor to the modern Albanian alphabet.

== See also ==
- Mount Nemërçkë
