= Labovë e Kryqit =

- Settlement
- Location within Albania
- Coordinates: 40°4′25″N 20°17′30″E
- Country: Albania
- County: Gjirokastër
- Municipality: Libohovë
- Administrative unit: Qendër Libohovë
- Time zone: UTC+1 (CET)
  - Summer (DST): UTC+2 (CEST)

Labovë e Kryqit (Labovë of the Cross) is a settlement in Southern Albania, which has taken the name of its Dormition of the Theotokos Church. It consists of two neighbourhoods: Labovë e Poshtme (Lower Labovë) and Labovë e Sipërme (Upper Labovë). To distinguish it from other places named Labovë, the village is known by two names Labovë e Kryqit, in reference to a nearby old Byzantine church and Labovë e Libohovës (Labovë of Libohovë). It is part of the Qendër Libohovë subdivision of the Libohovë municipality, in Gjirokastër County, southern Albania.

== Name ==
Afanasy Selishchev (1931), derived Labovë from the Slavic hleb’ meaning bread and Xhelal Ylli (1997) states that is not semantically possible. The suffix -ov-a is a Slavic formation. The root word of the toponym might denote the following: a Lab, an inhabitant of Labëria, the proto-Slavic *lap’ for "leaf", or Bulgarian words for plants like lop (petasites), lopen (verbascum), lopuh (arctium tomentosum). The proto-Slavic reflex a in the placename became o in Slavic, while in Albanian its a, with an Albanian sound change of p to b. If the toponym is derived from Lab, Ylli suggests it would mean the incoming Slavs encountered the earlier residents there, the Labs.

== Demographics ==
In the interwar period Nicholas Hammond passed through the area and described Labovë as a place of mixed speech (Albanian and Greek), with Albanian as the mother tongue. In fieldwork done by Leonidas Kallivretakis in 1992, Labovë e Kryqit had an exclusive Albanian Orthodox population.

== Attractions ==
- The Byzantine-era Albanian Orthodox Dormition of the Theotokos Church
- A Hellenistic fortified site of ancient Chaonia is located in Labovë.

== Notable people ==
- Vasileios of Dryinoupolis, bishop and politician
