= Selckë =

Selckë Selitskã Σέλτση
- Village
- Location within Albania
- Coordinates: 40°6′27″N 20°17′42″E
- Country: Albania
- County: Gjirokastër
- Municipality: Dropull
- Administrative unit: Pogon
- Time zone: UTC+1 (CET)
  - Summer (DST): UTC+2 (CEST)

Selckë is a small village in the former Pogon municipality in the Gjirokastër County, southern Albania. At the 2015 local government reform it became part of the municipality Dropull. In the early 1990s, the village was inhabited by an Orthodox Albanian majority and an Aromanian minority, while in the 2010s a Greek community is also recorded.

== Name ==
The name of the settlement Selckë is formed from the Slavic word for village Selo and the suffix ci referring to a resident's name. The current name was derived either from the Slavic form Selbska, with a sound change of s to c or from the Slavic Sel'ce with the addition of the suffix ka. In Aromanian the village is known as Selitskã and in Greek as Σέλτση.

== Geography ==
The village lies on the slopes of Mount Nemërçkë. Selckë is considered as the southernmost village of the Lunxhëri region. In terms of current Albanian administration Selckë is part of the Pogon municipal unit.

== History ==
In late Ottoman period, Selckë was the only Albanian speaking village in the kaza (subdistrict) of Pogon. As such, in 1869 it was detached from the kaza of Pogoni, where it was the only Albanian-speaking village and became part of the kaza of Gjirokastër, which was predominantly Albanian-speaking.

At 1868 a Greek school was already operating in the village. In 1911–1913, Dimitrios Zervas, local benefactor and successful businessman, financially supported the local Greek schools and the Orthodox churches, he also offered scholarships to local students to attend the Phanar Greek Orthodox College, in Constantinople. In the early 20th century, many inhabitants participated in late Ottoman immigration, but sent remittances home, helping the development of the village. During the interwar period Selckë had 35 houses with the inhabitants being Albanian speaking. In the 1950s and 1960s, during the communist period many inhabitants moved to Tirana or other Albanian cities, and their houses were then occupied by Aromanians.

In 1990 the village had 33 Aromanian families and 32 native Lunxhot Orthodox Albanian families, the former having been settled there as a result of the forcible relocations by the communist regime of People's Republic of Albania. In 1992 it was reported that Aromanians were the overall majority. Today, a part of the population has migrated, mostly to Greece, with Aromanians migrating at higher rates than natives, and often with no plans to return. According to a 2014 report by the Albanian government, the number of registered citizens who belong to the Greek minority is 180.

== Notable people ==
- Pandeli Sotiri, teacher and Albanian Rilindja activist
- Dimitrios Zervas, local benefactor and successful businessman

== Sources ==
- Kallivretakis, Leonidas (1995). "Η ελληνική κοινότητα της Αλβανίας υπό το πρίσμα της ιστορικής γεωγραφίας και δημογραφίας [The Greek Community of Albania in terms of historical geography and demography." In Nikolakopoulos, Ilias, Kouloubis Theodoros A. & Thanos M. Veremis (eds). Ο Ελληνισμός της Αλβανίας [The Greeks of Albania]. University of Athens.
- Koltsida, Athina (2007). Η Εκπαίδευση στη Βόρεια Ήπειρο κατά την Ύστερη Περίοδο της Οθωμανικής Αυτοκρατορίας (Thesis) (in Greek). University of Thessaloniki. pp. 227–228. doi:10.12681/eadd/23579. hdl:10442/hedi/23579.
- Gilles de Rapper. Better than Muslims, not as Good as Greeks: Emigration as experienced and imagined by the Albanian Christians of Lunxhëri The New Albanian Migration. Brighton-Portland, Sussex Academic Press (2005)
