= Palokastër =

- Village
- Location within Albania
- Coordinates: 40°9′30″N 20°6′10″E
- Country: Albania
- County: Gjirokastër
- Municipality: Gjirokastër
- Administrative unit: Cepo
- Time zone: UTC+1 (CET)
  - Summer (DST): UTC+2 (CEST)
- Postal Code: 6009

Palokastër (Albanian definite form: Palokastra), is a village in the administrative unit of Cepo, Gjirokastër, southern Albania.

The village is well known because in its vicinity is the Paleokastra castle. The site was first discovered by British Major William Martin Leake, who said that locals called the site Drinopol. Albanian archaeologist Apollon Baçe worked on an expedition from 1974 to 1976, highlighting the size of the site. He dug into the Castle in the shape of a trapezoid with an area of about 1 hectare. During the excavations of 1974, mainly in the western part, in August of that year the foundations of the soldiers dormitories, a Paleo-Christian basilica and 8 tower premises were discovered.

A year later in August 1975, the east and south sides were cleared and 16 graves were discovered. In August 1976, the north side was cleared and consolidation and conservation works for towers, churches and tombs began. The castle had four entrances and 14 towers. The main entrance was discovered in the middle of the Castle where the main road passed during Roman-Byzantine rule.
