= List of Albanians in Turkey =

This is a list of notable people of full or partial Albanian descent associated with the Ottoman Empire or Turkey, arranged by occupation.

== History and politics ==
=== Sultans and consorts ===
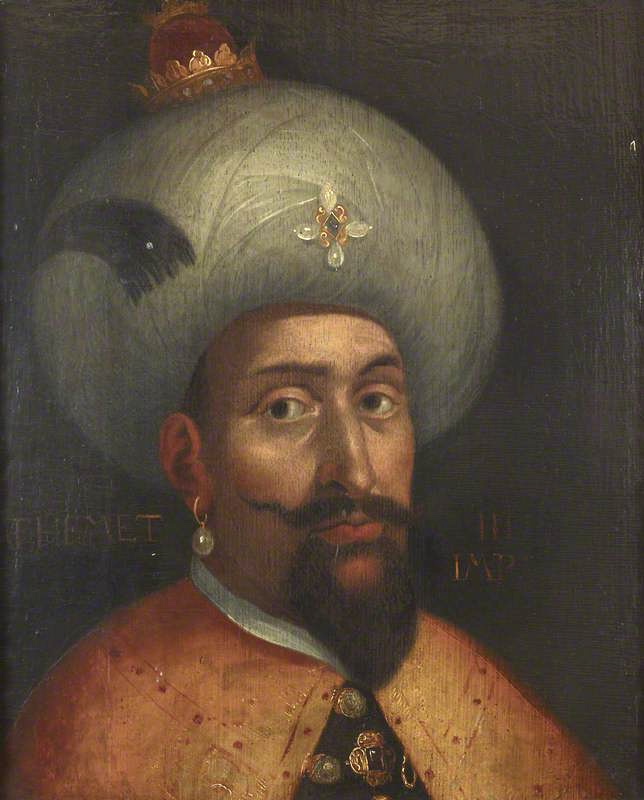
Mehmed III served as Sultan of the Ottoman Empire from 1595 until his passing in 1603.

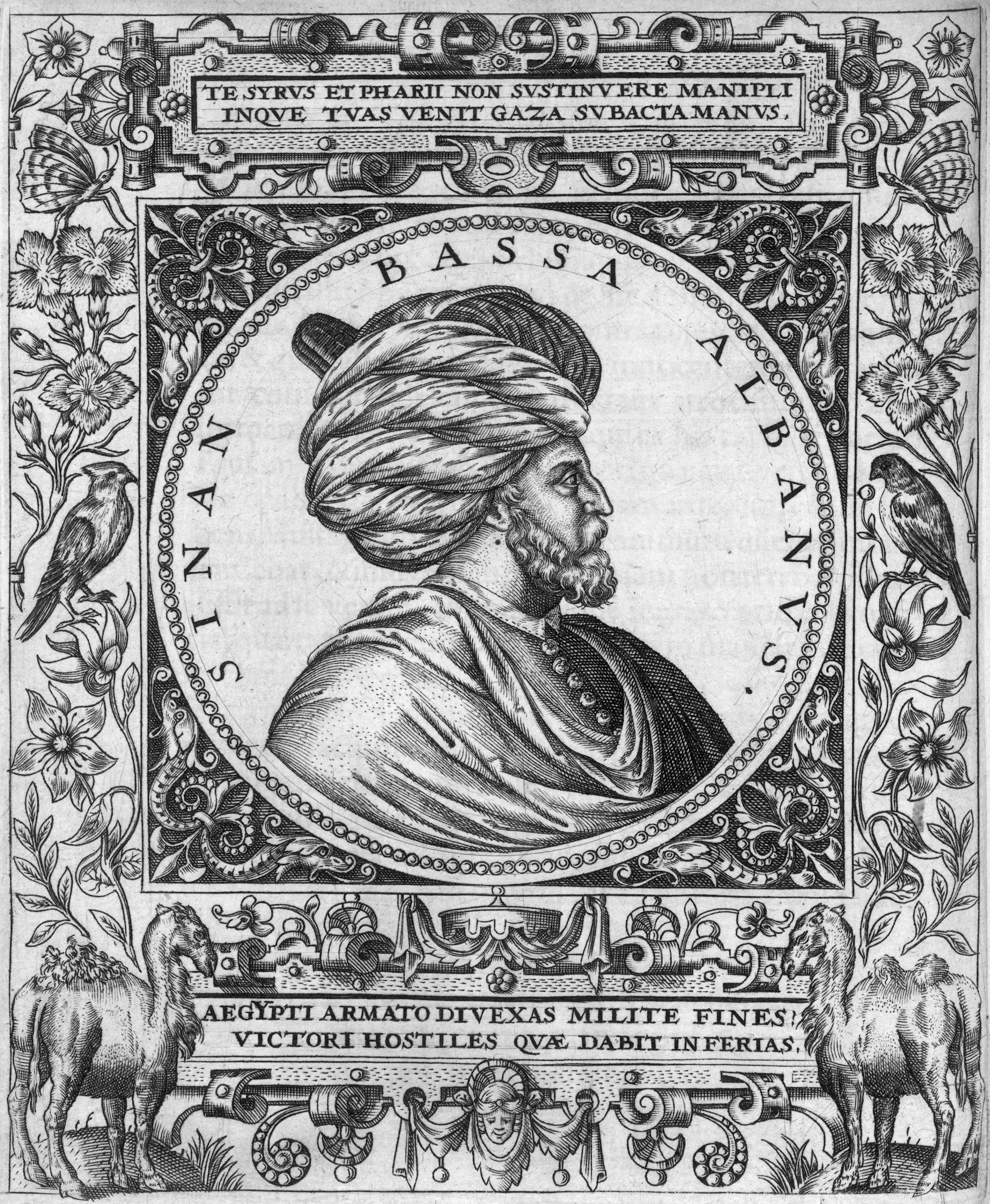
Koca Sinan Pasha was appointed governor of Ottoman Egypt in 1569 and was subsequently involved until 1571 in the conquest of Yemen, becoming known as Fātiḥ-i Yemen ("Conqueror of Yemen").

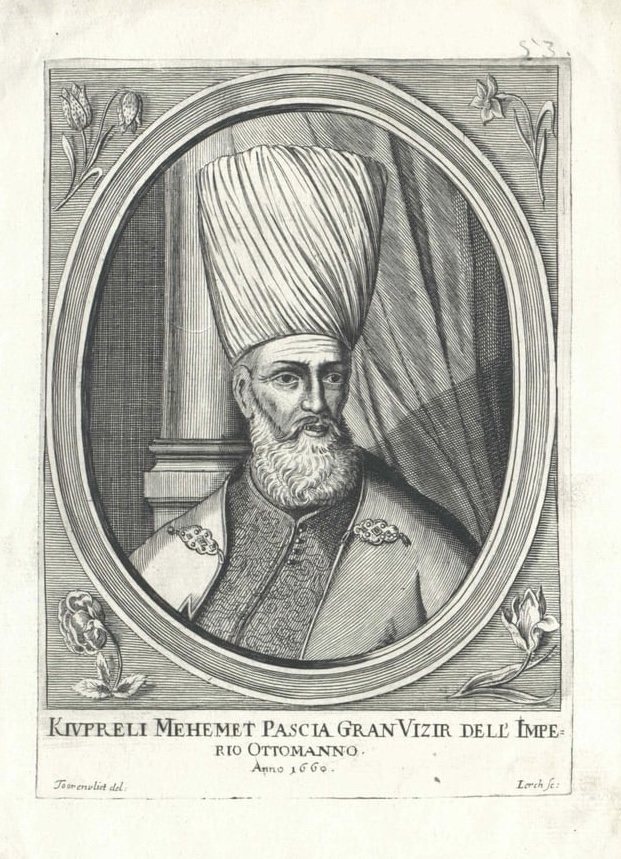
Köprülü Mehmed Pasha was patriarch of the Köprülü political dynasty which produced six grand viziers for the Ottoman Empire.

- Bayezid II – sultan
- Gülbahar Hatun – imperial consort and Valide Sultan
- Mahidevran – imperial consort of Suleiman the Magnificent
- Mehmed III – sultan
- Safiye Sultan – imperial consort and Valide Sultan
- Şemsperi Haseki – imperial consort of Murad IV

=== Grand viziers ===
- Ahmed Izzet Pasha – field marshal and grand vizier
- Amcazade Köprülü Hüseyin Pasha – grand vizier
- Arabacı Ali Pasha – grand vizier
- Ayas Mehmed Pasha – grand vizier
- Bayezid Pasha – grand vizier
- Çavuşbaşı Memiş Pasha – grand vizier
- Dukaginzade Ahmed Pasha – grand vizier
- Hadım Hasan Pasha – grand vizier
- Haji Halil Pasha – grand vizier
- Hezarpare Ahmed Pasha – grand vizier
- Ivazzade Halil Pasha – grand vizier
- Ishak Pasha – grand vizier
- Kara Ahmed Pasha – grand vizier
- Kemankeş Kara Mustafa Pasha – military officer, Kapudan Pasha and grand vizier
- Koca Davud Pasha – general and grand vizier
- Koca Sinan Pasha – military commander and grand vizier
- Köprülü Mehmed Pasha – grand vizier and founder of the Köprülü political dynasty
- Köprülüzade Fazıl Ahmed Pasha – grand vizier from 1661 to 1676
- Köprülüzade Fazıl Mustafa Pasha – grand vizier
- Köprülüzade Numan Pasha – grand vizier
- Lütfi Pasha – grand vizier
- Mehmed Ferid Pasha – grand vizier
- Mere Hüseyin Pasha – grand vizier
- Mustafa Naili Pasha – grand vizier
- Nasuh Pasha – grand vizier
- Ohrili Hüseyin Pasha – grand vizier
- Rüstem Pasha – grand vizier
- Said Halim Pasha – grand vizier
- Semiz Ahmed Pasha – grand vizier
- Serdar Ferhad Pasha – grand vizier
- Tabanıyassı Mehmed Pasha – grand vizier
- Tarhoncu Ahmed Pasha – grand vizier
- Yemişçi Hasan Pasha – grand vizier
- Zagan Pasha – statesman, military commander and grand vizier
- Zurnazen Mustafa Pasha – grand vizier

=== Statesmen ===
- Abdi Pasha the Albanian – military commander and governor of Budin
- Hasan Tahsin Uzer – statesman and governor of several provinces
- Ismail Fazıl Pasha – general and statesman who served as Minister of Public Works
- Kara Murat Pasha – statesman and military officer
- Mahmud Dramali Pasha – military commander and statesman who served as governor of Larissa, Drama and the Morea and commanded the Ottoman campaign against the Greek Revolution
- Ohrili Hüseyin Pasha – statesman
- Reşid Akif Pasha – statesman who served as governor, Minister of the Interior and a member of the Council of State

=== Military figures ===
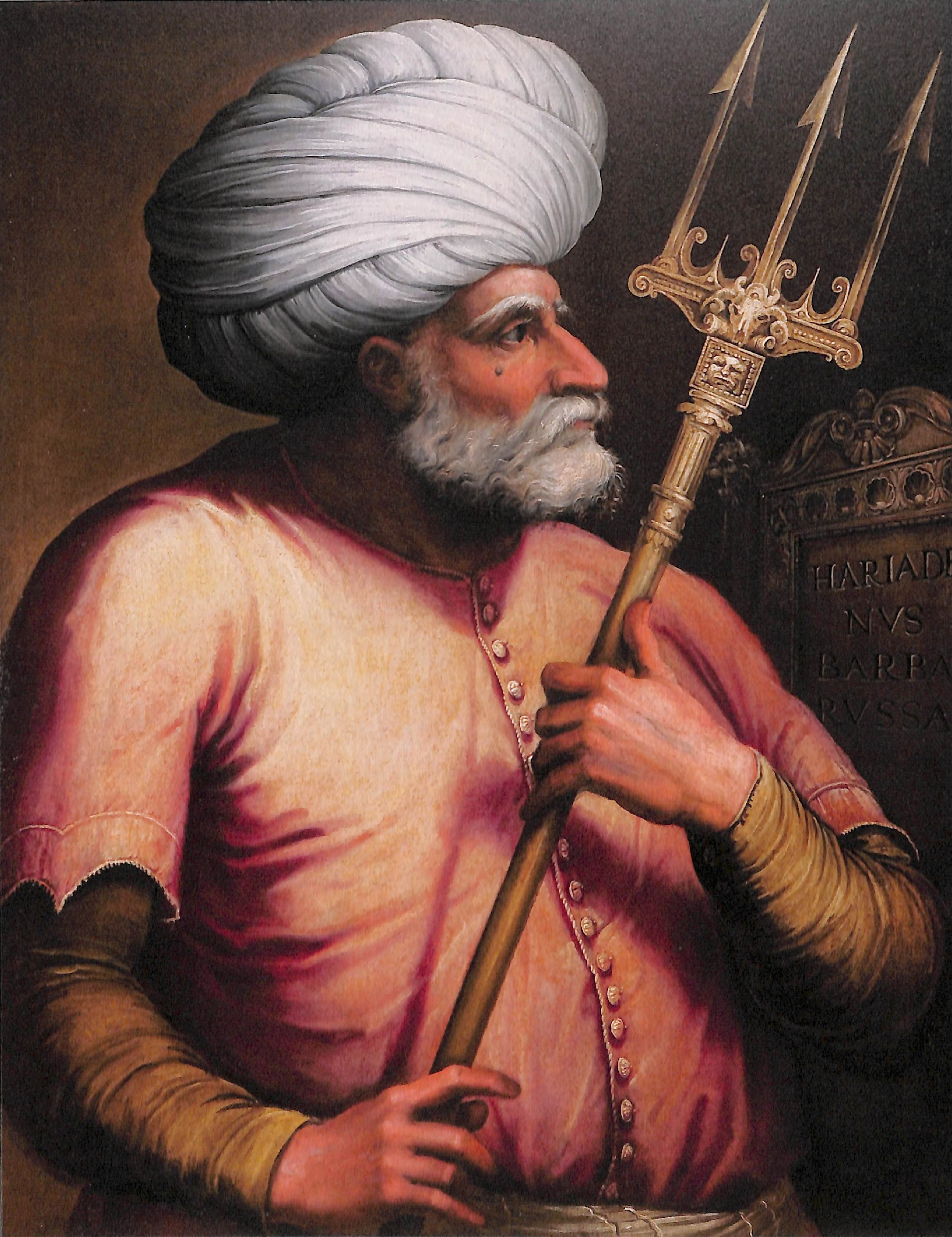
Admiral Hayreddin Barbarossa secured Ottoman dominance over the Mediterranean during the mid-16th century.

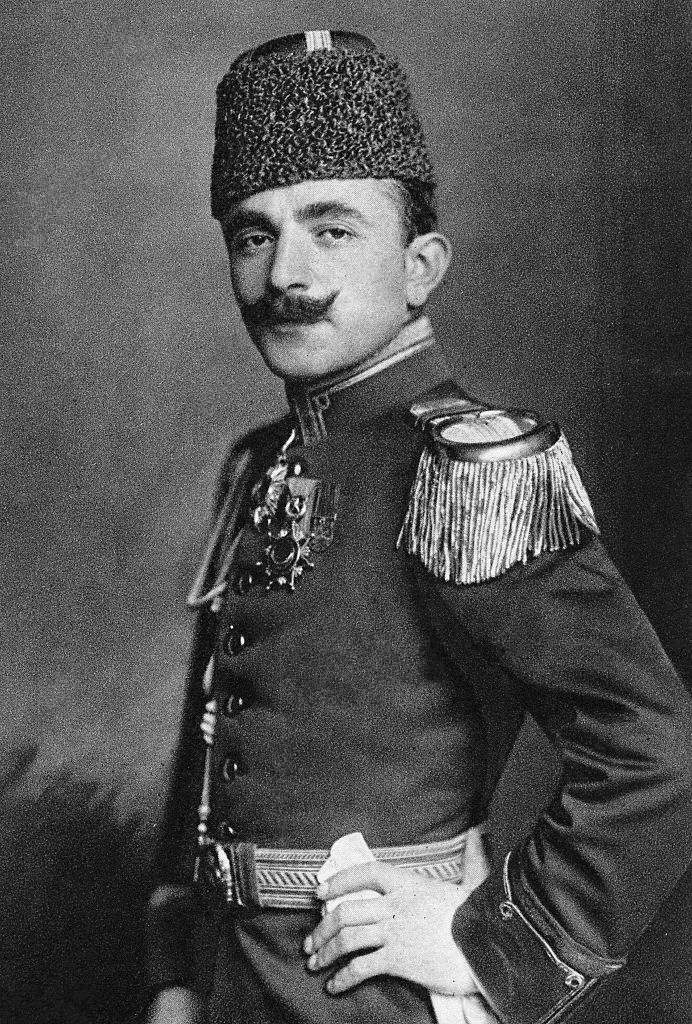
Enver Pasha was the leader of the Young Turk Revolution.

- Ballaban Badera – military commander and statesman
- Gedik Ahmed Pasha – military commander and statesman
- Hasan Rami Pasha – naval officer and admiral
- Hayreddin Barbarossa – admiral
- Kâzım Özalp – military officer and politician
- Naci Eldeniz – general and military educator
- Nasuh Pasha – grand vizier and military commander
- Nurettin Ersin – general
- Oruç Reis – corsair and admiral
- Patrona Halil – military figure and political rebel
- Resneli Niyazi Bey – military officer and revolutionary
- Şefik Aker – military officer
- Şemsi Pasha – military officer and commander
- Vehip Pasha – general

=== Politicians and diplomats ===
- Abdülhalik Renda – civil servant and politician
- Abdülkadir Aksu – politician
- Abdülkadir Cenkçiler – industrialist and politician
- Abidin Pasha – statesman and diplomat
- Ahmet Piriştina – politician and mayor of İzmir
- Elyesa Bazna – intelligence operative
- Eyüp Sabri Akgöl – military officer, parliamentarian and political activist
- Ibrahim Temo – Ottoman politician and physician
- Kenan Evren – military officer and politician
- Rıza Tevfik Bölükbaşı – philosopher, poet and politician
- Rıza Vamık Uras – politician, civil servant and diplomat

== Literature and journalism ==
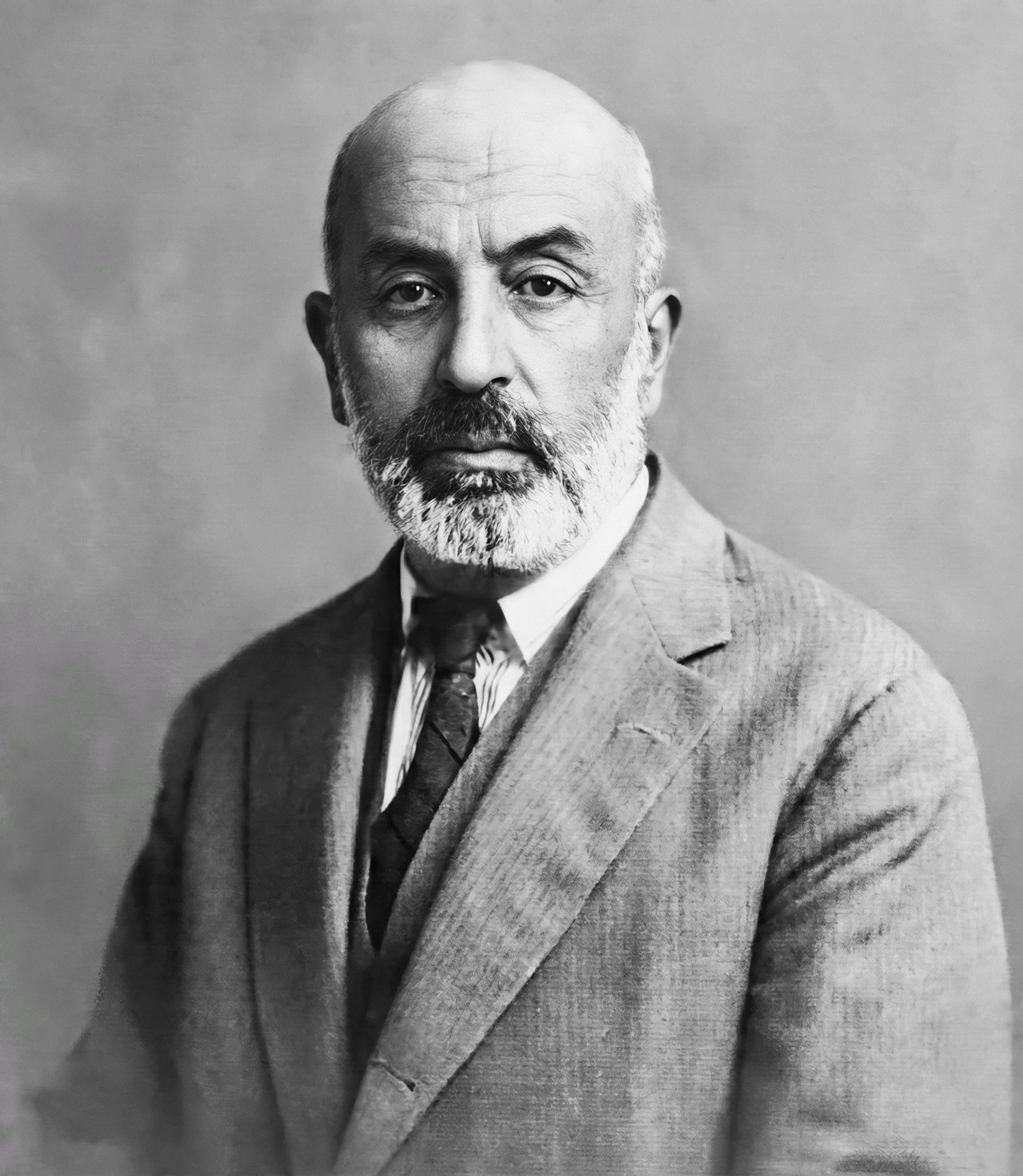
Mehmet Akif Ersoy is the author of the Turkish National Anthem.

- Abedin Dino – statesman, poet and writer
- Can Dündar – journalist, columnist and documentary filmmaker
- Mehmet Akif Ersoy – poet, writer and academic
- Namık Kemal – writer, journalist, playwright and political activist
- Nezim Frakulla – poet
- Pashko Vasa – writer, poet and publicist
- Pelin Batu – writer, historian, actress and television personality
- Taşlıcalı Yahya – Ottoman poet and military officer

== Arts and culture ==
=== Architecture and visual arts ===
- Arif Dino – painter and poet
- Mimar Kasım Ağa – architect and chief imperial architect
- Omer Kaleshi – painter
- Sabri Berkel – painter and mosaic artist
- Sedefkar Mehmed Agha – architect

=== Cinema and television ===
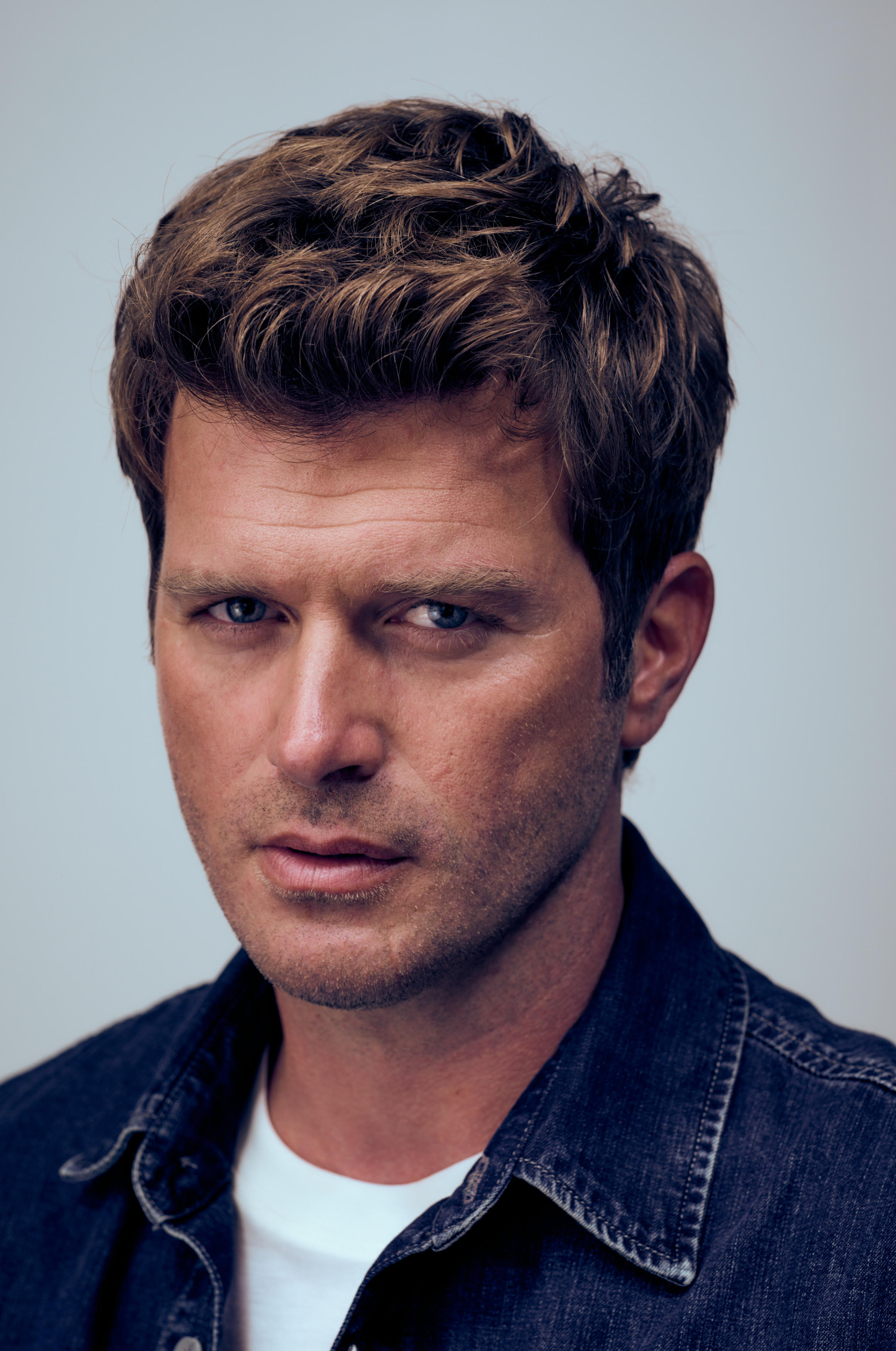
Actor Kıvanç Tatlıtuğ has won four Golden Butterfly Awards for his roles on a TV series.

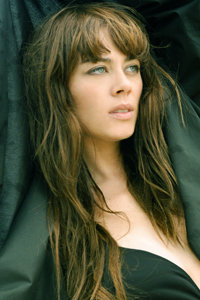
Actress Demet Evgar is known for her roles in feature films and TV series.

- Aydemir Akbaş – actor, director and screenwriter
- Ahmet Mümtaz Taylan – actor and television personality
- Atakan Hoşgören – actor and model
- Barış Arduç – actor and model
- Bergüzar Korel – actress of Albanian and Cretan Turkish ancestry
- Burak Yörük – actor
- Demet Evgar – actress
- Emre Bey – actor
- Engin Altan Düzyatan – actor, presenter and producer
- Engin Şenkan – actor
- Erdal Beşikçioğlu – actor, director and politician
- Fikret Kuşkan – actor
- Filiz Akın – actress whose maternal grandfather was of Albanian descent and one of the leading actresses of Turkish cinema
- Halit Ergenç – actor of partial Albanian descent, known for roles in Turkish television and film
- Kaan Urgancıoğlu – actor of Albanian and Syrian ancestry on his mother's side
- Kıvanç Tatlıtuğ – actor and model
- Müge Anlı – journalist and television presenter
- Saruhan Hünel – actor
- Serkay Tütüncü – actor and former footballer
- Sümeyye Aydoğan – actress and singer
- Tolgahan Sayışman – actor, model and producer

=== Music ===
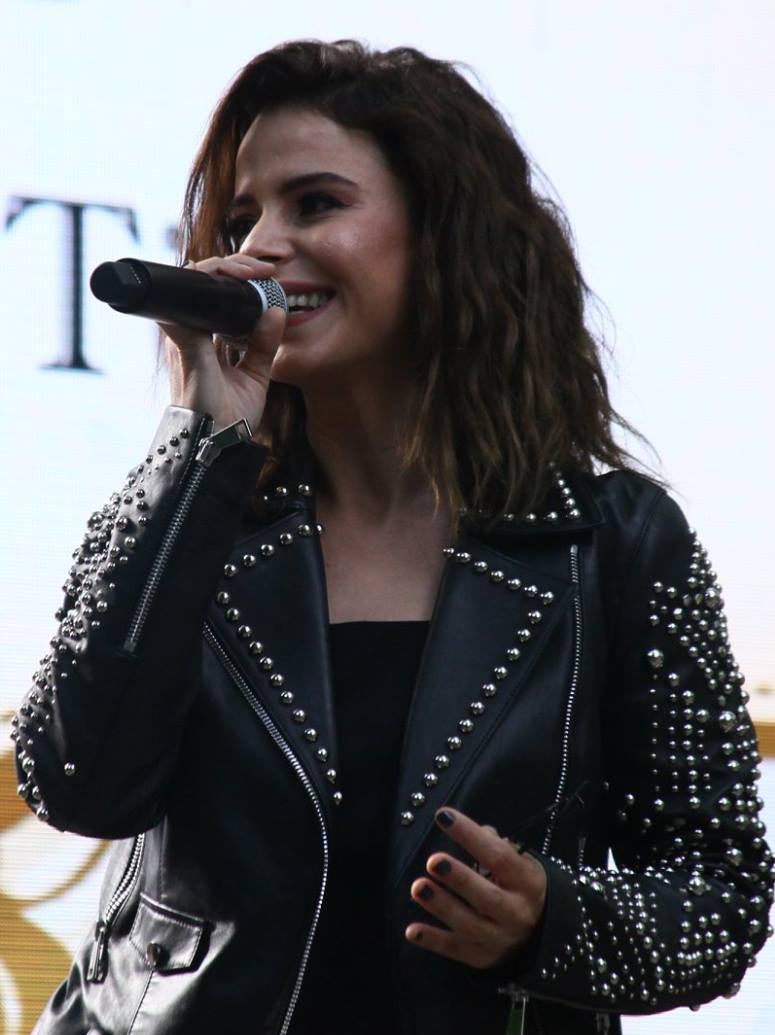
Simge is one of Turkey's biggest pop stars.

- Arif Şentürk – folk singer and compiler
- Candan Erçetin – singer and songwriter
- Çelik Erişçi – musician, singer and composer
- Derya Uluğ – singer and songwriter
- Ekin Uzunlar – singer and kemençe musician
- Fettah Can – singer and songwriter
- Fuat Güner – musician and songwriter
- Metin Şentürk – singer
- Sinan Akçıl – singer and songwriter
- Simge Sağın – singer, songwriter and composer
- Soner Özbilen – folk singer, conductor and compiler
- Yeşim Salkım – singer and actress
- Zeynep Bastık – singer, songwriter and actress

=== Fashion ===
- Almeda Abazi – model and actress
- Didem Soydan – model
- Gizem Karaca – actress and model

== Science and academia ==
- Celal Şengör – geologist and academic
- Hasan Tahsini – astronomer, mathematician and philosopher who became the first rector of Istanbul University
- Şemseddin Sami – author of the first Turkish-to-Turkish dictionary (Kamus-i Türki) and the first Turkish encyclopedia (Kamusu'l-Alam)
- Yücel Aşkın – historian and academic

== Business and economy ==
- Aysun Karaytuğ – economist and financial executive
- Cengiz Özyalçın – physician, businessman and sports administrator
- Hasan Arat – businessman, former basketball player and sports executive
- İlhan Cavcav – businessman and football executive
- İrfan Aktar – architect, businessman and sports administrator
- Aytaç Kot – businessman and entrepreneur
- Kemal Derviş – economist and academic
- Özhan Canaydın – businessman, basketball player and sports executive

== Sports ==
=== Football ===
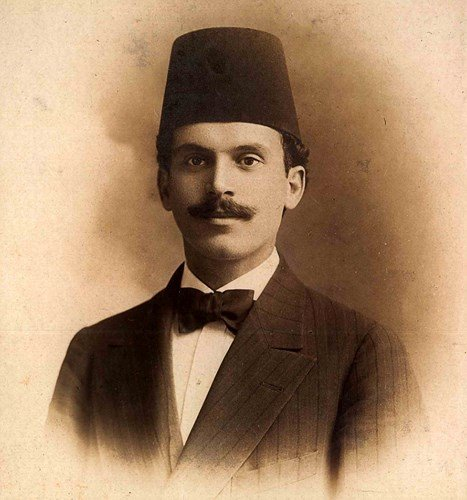
Ali Sami Yen founded the Galatasaray sports club and its football stadium is named after him.

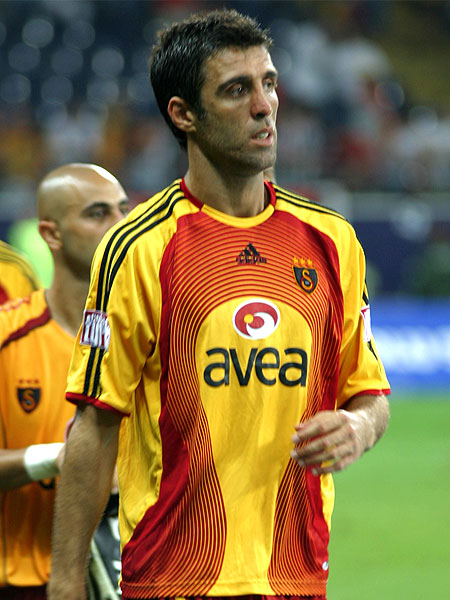
Hakan Şükür is the all-time top goal scorer of Turkey's national football team.

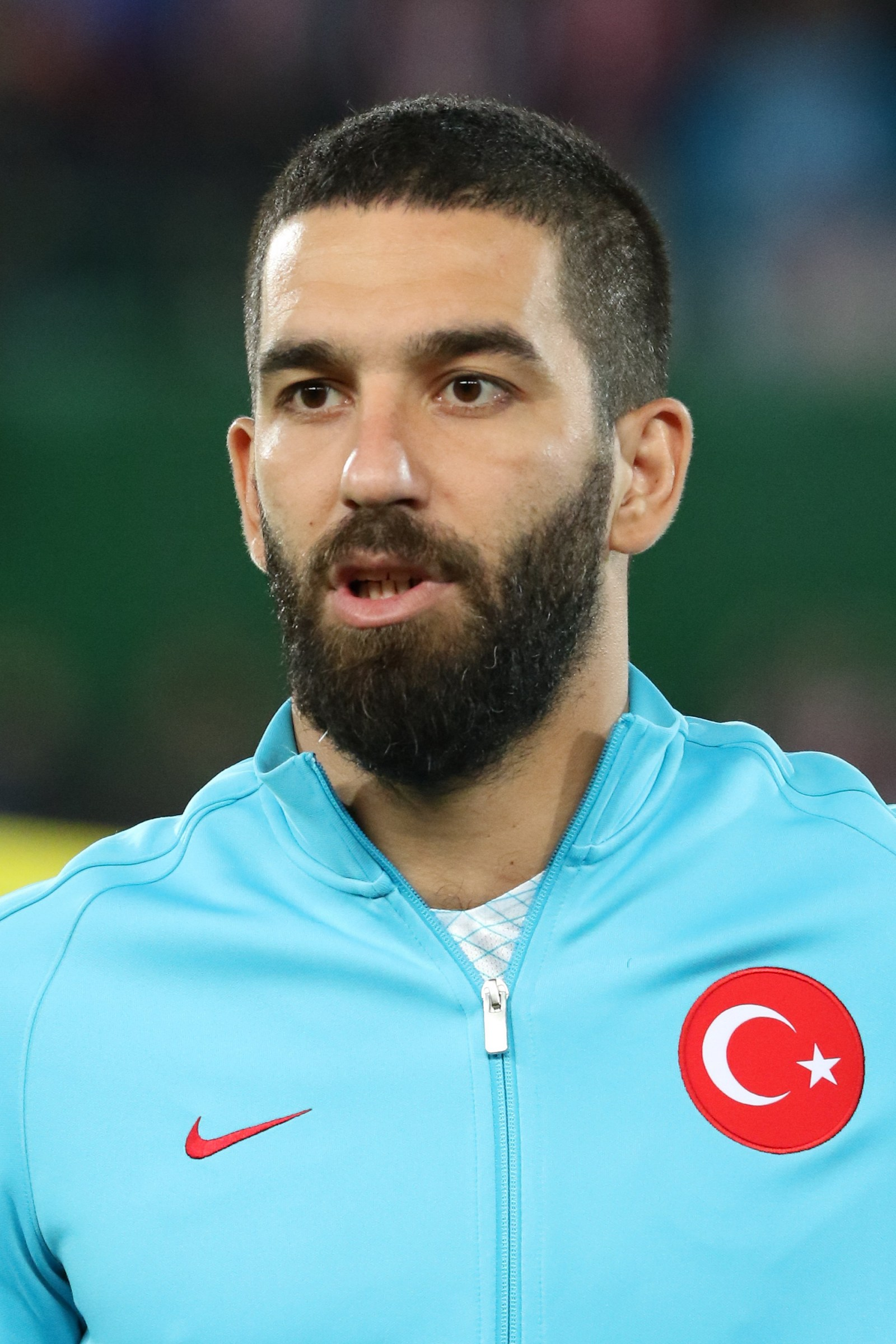
Arda Turan was capped 100 times for Turkey's national football team.

- Ali Sami Yen – sports official and founder of Galatasaray
- Arif Erdem – footballer and coach
- Ayhan Akman – footballer and coach
- Berkay Can Değirmencioğlu – footballer
- Berkay Vardar – footballer
- Berat Tosun – footballer
- Derya Arhan – women's footballer
- Eray İşcan – footballer
- Ergün Berisha – footballer
- Erkan Kaş – footballer
- Erten Ersu – footballer
- Ersun Yanal – football manager
- Fuat Yaman – football manager
- Gökhan Güleç – footballer
- Hakan Şükür – footballer and former politician
- İsmail Yüksek – footballer
- Mehmet Sedef – footballer
- Necip Uysal – footballer
- Okan Kocuk – footballer
- Orhan Ak – footballer and coach
- Serdar Kurtuluş – footballer
- Serkan Kurtuluş – footballer
- Sertan Vardar – footballer
- Sevgi Salmanlı – women's footballer
- Ufuk Ceylan – footballer
- Yunus Akgün – footballer

=== Basketball ===
- Batin Tuna – basketball player
- Ercan Osmani – basketball player
- Ermal Kuqo – basketball player
- Kenan Sipahi – basketball player

=== Other sports ===
- Benli Abdullah Subaşı – oil wrestler and Kırkpınar champion
- Mülayim Pehlivan – oil wrestler and Kırkpınar champion
- Nasuh Mahruki – mountaineer, photographer and documentary filmmaker
