= Zhulat =

- Village
- Location within Albania
- Coordinates: 40°7′11″N 19°59′20″E
- Country: Albania
- County: Gjirokastër
- Municipality: Gjirokastër
- Administrative unit: Cepo
- Elevation: 395 m (1,296 ft)
- Time zone: UTC+1 (CET)
  - Summer (DST): UTC+2 (CEST)
- Postal Code: 6001

Zhulat is a village in Southern Albania. It is part of the former Cepo municipality. As part of the 2015 local government reform, it became part of the municipality Gjirokastër. The village is inhabited by Muslim Albanians. Papa Zhuli a Catholic priest who is credited for the Kanun of Labëria, is said to be from Zhulat which can be seen from his surname Zhuli. He moved from Zhulat to Labëria.

== Notable people ==
- Nexhip Alpan
