= Qiriazi =

Qiriazi is a surname. Notable people with the surname include:

- Gjerasim Qiriazi (1858–1894), Albanian Protestant preacher
- Gjergj Qiriazi (1868–1912), was an Albanian patriot
- Parashqevi Qiriazi (1880–1970), Albanian teacher
- Sevasti Qiriazi (ca. 1871–1949), was an Albanian patriot
