= Sevasti Qiriazi =

Albanian activist and educator (ca. 1870–1949)

Sevasti Qiriazi-Dako (Sevastia D. Kyrias)
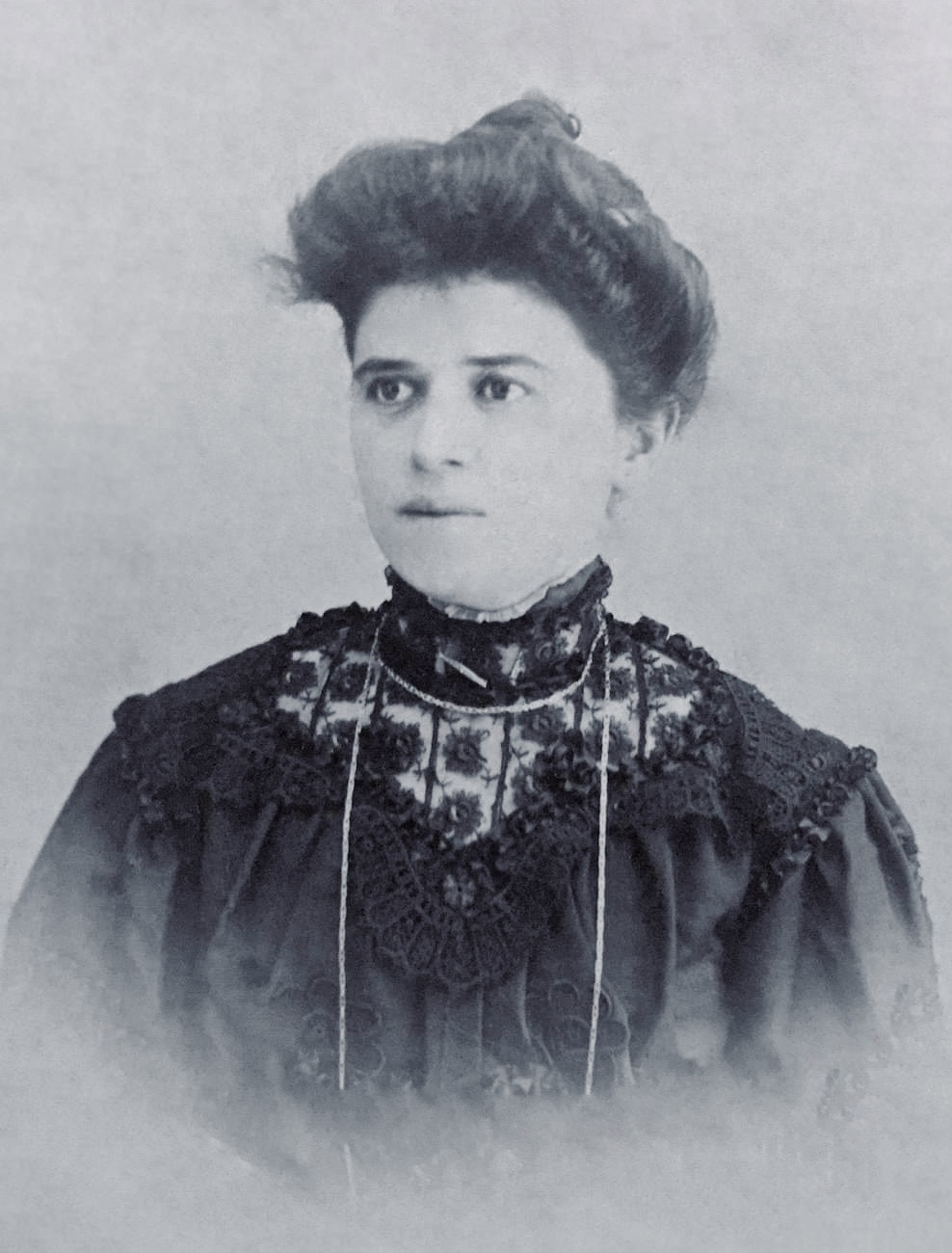
- Sevasti Qiriazi-Dako
- Born: ca. 1870; Manastir, Manastir Vilayet, Ottoman Empire
- Died: August 30, 1949 (aged 77–78); Tirana, Albania
- Resting place: Tirana, Varrezat e Sharrës
- Other names: Sevasti D. Kyrias, Sevasti Kyrias-Dako, Sevasti Qirias
- Education: Bachelor of Arts
- Alma mater: American College for Girls at Constantinople (B.A.)
- Occupations: Educator, Missionary
- Spouse: Kristo Dako
- Children: Aleksandër Dako, Gjergj Dako
- Parent(s): Dhimitër Qiriazi, Maria Qiriazi (Vodica)
- Relatives: Gjerasim Qiriazi, Gjergj Qiriazi, Kristo Qiriazi, Parashqevi Qiriazi
- Awards: Order of Skanderbeg Order of Freedom Order for Patriotic Activity People's Teacher Honor of the Nation Symbol of the City (Tirana)

Sevasti Qiriazi-Dako (Sevasti D. Kyrias) (ca. 1871–1949) was an Albanian patriot, educator, Protestant missionary, author, pioneer of Albanian female education, and activist of the Albanian National Awakening.

== Life and early career ==
=== Early life ===
Sevasti was born ca. 1870 to the patriotic Qiriazi family of Tërnovë, Monastir, in today's North Macedonia, then Ottoman Empire. She was the sixth of ten children. Her family's religious background was Orthodox, and she began attending a Greek-language primary school at age four. In her youth she learned several languages (Albanian, Greek, Bulgarian, Wallachian, Turkish, English). She and her family came into close contact with Albanian patriots and American Protestant missionaries who operated a school and conducted religious services near their home in Monastir. Sevasti was enrolled in the Americans' school and graduated with the equivalent of a high school diploma in July 1888.

=== Education ===
Sevasti attended the American College for Girls at Constantinople from 1888–1891. Her brother Rev. Gjerasim Qiriazi arranged her enrollment. She was admitted as a sophomore and graduated in 1891 with a class of eight women and received a Bachelor of Arts degree, becoming the first Albanian female to complete a college education. Her purpose for attending college was to prepare herself to help her brother Gjerasim open a girls' school in Albania. Sevasti identified her key influencers in college as: Clara Hamlin (the college's principal and the daughter of Cyrus Hamlin), Florence A. Fensham, Mary Mills Patrick, Ida Prime, Caroline Borden, and the Bulgarian Grandinaroff family. Gjerasim Qiriazi invited the influential Albanian Frashëri brothers (Abdyl Frashëri, Sami Frashëri and Naim Frashëri) to attend Sevasti's graduation. Naim Frashëri used his role in the Ottoman government to register her diploma officially and obtain an irade (official decree) for the opening of the first Albanian school for girls in Korçë(pronounced [ˈkɔɾtʃə]; Albanian definite form: Korça).

=== Protestant missionary activity ===
Though Orthodox Christian by birth, Sevasti joined the Protestant community founded by her brother Gjerasim. In Korçë she led Bible studies and prayer meetings for women. She was a "Bible Woman" and was financed by the ABCFM's Woman's Board of Missions and the Bible Lands Missions' Aid Society. She referred to herself as a missionary when traveling to the USA to visit Ellen Stone and John Henry House in 1904.

=== The Korça Girls School (1891–1914) ===
==== Founding and operations ====
After her graduation from college, Sevasti returned to Monastir and then to Korçë, where she joined her brother Gjerasim in opening an Albanian-language school for girls. Sevasti was its director. The school operated under difficult conditions including poverty, prejudice against female education, difficulty in obtaining books, political opposition from local Ottoman authorities, and political and ecclesiastical opposition from the Greek Orthodox Church. Despite these unfavorable circumstances, the school maintained an average yearly enrollment of 47 students during 1891–1913. The school received significant visitors such as Edith Durham in 1901 and Henry Brailsford in 1904.

==== Religious instruction ====
At the time of its existence, the school was known as a Protestant Christian school. Its founders were Evangelicals, it was supported by Protestant organizations, its educational curriculum included religious subjects with biblical texts, and its premises were used for Evangelical Sunday School and worship services. However, the school welcomed students of all religions and its teachers did not require conversion to Protestantism. It was praised by Albanians of all religions and classes as being a "national nest" (fole kombëtare).

==== Leadership ====
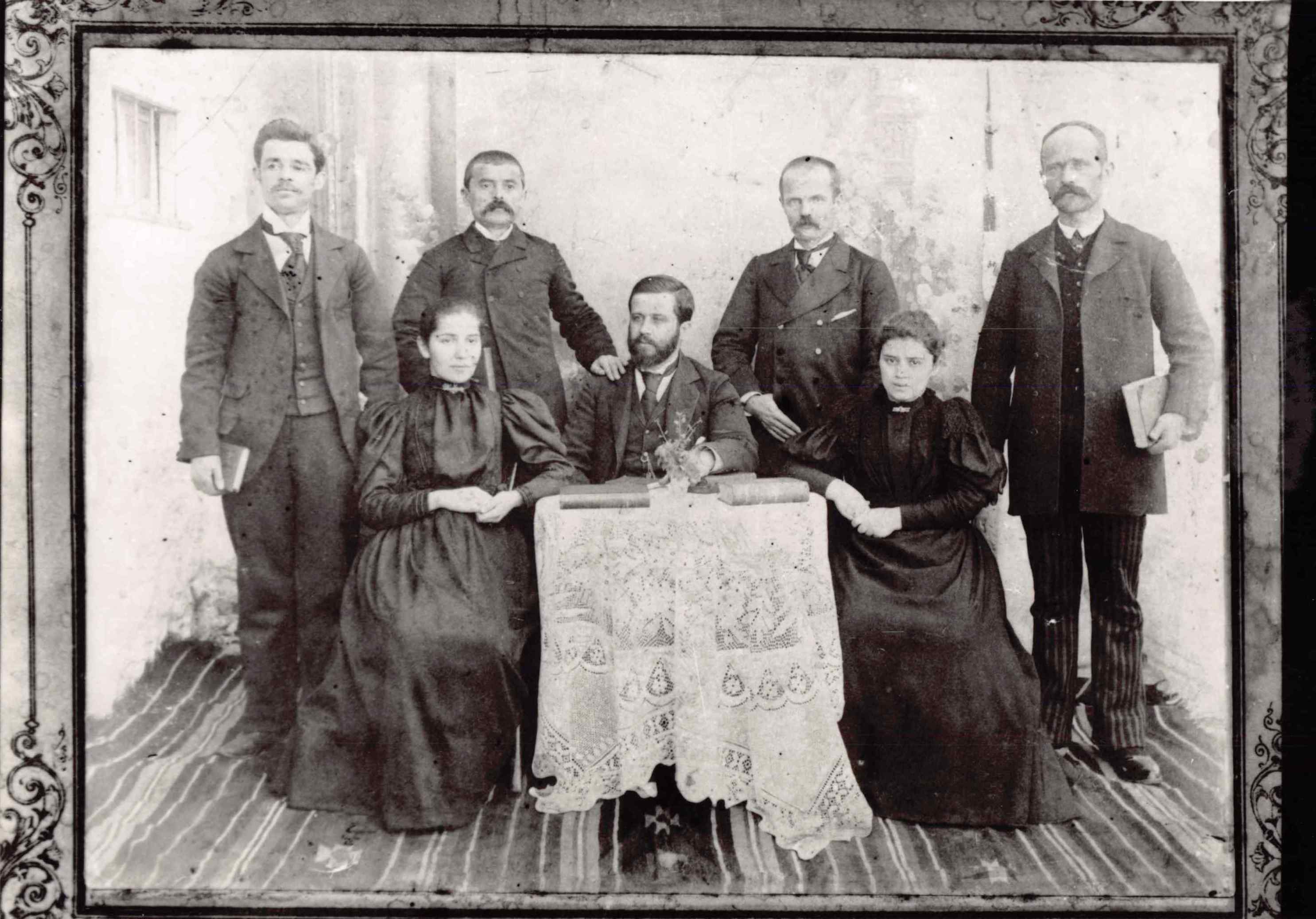
Staff of the Girls School and Evangelical Work in Kortcha Albania in 1894

When Gjerasim Qiriazi died in 1894, Sevasti Qiriazi (at approximately 23 years old) assumed full responsibility for the Girls School. She shared leadership over the following years with Luka Tira, Fanka Efthim, Thanas Sina, Grigor Cilka, Gjergj Qiriazi, and Gjon Ciko, and she eventually solicited the help of the American Protestant missionaries Phineas and Violet Bond Kennedy, who arrived in Korça in 1908 (Violet was the daughter of an American Protestant missionary in Monastir, Lewis Bond, and was Sevasti's close friend throughout childhood and college).

==== Closure ====
The school continued to function through 1914, when war conditions and Greek hostilities in Korça forced its closure.

=== First visit to the United States ===
In summer 1904, after serving 13 years as director of the Albanian school for girls in Korça, Sevasti Qiriazi traveled to the United States. Parashqevi Qiriazi became director of the school in her absence. Sevasti arrived in New York in August 1904, and visited friends in New York, Boston, and Chicago, speaking about Albania at various women's societies. She resided for one month with Ellen Stone and visited Jane Addams and Hull House. She called her visit to the USA "a glimpse of liberty." During her return to Albania in May 1905, she visited London, Paris, and Vienna before stopping in Bucharest, where she met Pandeli Evangjeli and her future husband Christo Dako (1880-1941), a recent graduate of the University of Bucharest and general secretary of the Albanian "Dituria" society. Sevasti recruited Dako to prepare the first Albanian textbooks in mathematics.

=== Early national influence ===
In 1908, Sevasti was invited to represent her Girls School at the Congress of Monastir, which aimed to settle the Albanian alphabet question. Sevasti could not attend, but her sister Parashqevi attended in her place. A delegation from the Congress visited the Girls School in Korçë after the conclusion of the Congress, including Luigj Gurakuqi, Fehim Zavalani and Nyzhet Vrioni. In 1909 Sevasti was invited in her role as director of the school to take part in the Congress of Elbasan which aimed to address national education in Albania. She attended with her brother Gjergj Qiriazi.

=== Marriage and children ===
Sevasti was married to Kristo Dako on August 4, 1910. The ceremony was performed by Protestant missionary Rev. Charles Telford Erickson. They had two children, Aleksandër "Skënder" Dako (1910–1995) and Gjergj Dako (1913–1949). The full English rendering of their names was Alexander Gerasim Dako and George Charles Dako (namesakes for her two deceased brothers Gjerasim and Gjergj). Both boys studied for eight years at Robert College.

=== Friendship with Charles Crane ===
In 1911, Sevasti and her husband Kristo Dako were visited in Monastir by American businessman Charles Richard Crane, who was on the board of the American College for Girls at Constantinople and sought to learn more about Albania and the Near East. Crane had learned about Sevasti and Kristo through Edward I. Bosworth, dean of Oberlin Seminary and formerly K. Dako's professor at Oberlin. They maintained friendly and working relations for many years, later spending several summer holidays at Mr. and Mrs. Crane's summer home at Woods Hole, Massachusetts.

=== Exile from Albania and second journey to the USA ===
In 1914, due to hostilities with Greek forces in Korça, Sevasti, her husband, and their two children were forced to flee Albania, and the Girls School was closed. They spent nearly 12 months living in Bucharest and Sofia before emigrating to the United States in 1915 and settling in Natick and Southbridge, Massachusetts, where she would assist her husband in opening the first Albanian school in America at the local YMCA They resettled in Boston (Jamaica Plain) where Sevasti assisted her sister in publishing the semi-monthly periodical Yll'i Mëngjezit / Morning Star (1917–1920), and where she and her husband became more involved in Vatra and the Albanian national cause.

== Return to Albania and later years ==
At the end of 1921 Sevasti Qiriazi-Dako and her children returned to Albania, where her husband had previously returned to work with the Albanian government. In her memoirs, Sevasti described the conditions in Albania as being "primitive" and claimed she was inspired to devote the rest of her life to helping to rebuild her nation.

=== The Kyrias Institute (1922–1933) ===
Together with her husband Kristo Dako and her sister Parashqevi Qiriazi, Sevasti founded a new institution of female education in Tirana. Though privately funded, it was considered a national school, representing all districts, classes and religious beliefs. In 1926 they began construction of a new facility in Kamëz. The facility was operational by 1927 and completed in 1929. King Zog I, whose sisters Princess Myzejen Zogu and Princess Maxhide Zogu had attended the school in Tirana, visited the new campus. The school was notable for its library, athletics program, fine arts events, system of student government, and the success of its graduates. In 1931 the school celebrated the 40th anniversary of its founding, viewing itself as a continuation of the Girls School founded in Korçë in 1891. Many dignitaries, Albanian and foreign, attended the ceremony.

In 1933, with the nationalization of private education, the Kyrias Institute was forced to close and did not reopen despite repeated requests by the Qiriazi sisters to the government. Sevasti refused to allow the premises of the school to be rented by the Red Cross for humanitarian work or to be used for anything other than its original purpose for the education of women.

After the closure of the school Sevasti began writing her memoirs in English.

=== Under Italian invasion and occupation ===
The Italian invasion of Albania of 1939 led to the creation of the Italian protectorate of Albania (1939–1943). During this time period Sevasti's husband Kristo Dako passed away and the school property was repurposed by the Italian military as a weapons depot.

=== Internment after the German invasion ===
The German invasion and occupation of Albania placed Sevasti-Qiriazi Dako and her sister Parashqevi in further danger, their home and former school facilities being used, as they were, as a weapons depot at a time of intense conflict between Italian forces, Albanian anti-fascist and liberation forces, and German invaders. In 1943 the Germans fired on the school, killing Sevasti's friend and her son. Sevasti and her family were imprisoned and deported to the Banjica concentration camp near Belgrade by pro-Nazi units led by Xhaferr Deva.

=== Postwar years under communism ===
In late 1944, after a bombardment of the concentration camp by the Allied forces, Sevasti and her family were released and returned to Albania. They found their home had been ransacked, so began rebuilding. A variety of factors—such as Kristo Dako's affiliation with King Zog and his serving as minister in one of his cabinets, and the Qiriazis' and Dakos' affiliation with American schools, political figures and Protestant missionaries viewed by the government as spies—left them out of favor with the emerging communist regime in Albania. In 1946 they were evicted them from their home, and the school facilities were transformed into a communist party school. Kristo Dako's bones were exhumed, desecrated, and lost.

In 1946 Sevasti's sons Aleksandër and Gjergj were arrested and imprisoned, being accused of sedition, spying, and anti-state activities. In February 1949 Gjergj died in prison, during several days of intense interrogation and torture. In August 1949, after unsuccessful attempts to locate Gjergj's body and with Aleksandër still in prison, Sevasti died in poverty and with a broken heart.

From 1959 and beyond, largely due to the efforts of Skënder Luarasi, Sevasti Qiriazi and her family began to regain recognition in Albania for their contributions to Albanian education and the emancipation of women, being decorated posthumously with the Order of Freedom (1960), the Medal for Patriotic Activity (1962) and the "Teacher of the People" (1987)

== Published works ==
The following works or articles are known to have been written by Sevasti Qiriazi-Dako:

- "Albanian Girls' School Report". The Star in the East (56), October 1896. London: Bible Lands or Turkish Missions' Aid Society, 3.
- "Girls' School, Koritza, Albania". The Star in the East (58), April 1897. London: Bible Lands or Turkish Missions' Aid Society, 6.
- "Këng' e foshnjavet ndë djep", Hristomathi (Sofje: Mbrothësia, 1902), f. 93.
- "Kur dotë bënemi nëna", Hristomathi (Sofje: Mbrothësia, 1902), f. 108.
- "Përse bënenë pemët t'ëmbëla nëpër drurët?", Hristomathi (Sofje: Mbrothësia, 1902), f. 110.
- "Rrobat e Olimbisë", Hristomathi (Sofje: Mbrothësia, 1902), f. 112.
- "Të-shkruajturit e babajt", Hristomathi (Sofje: Mbrothësia, 1902), f. 117.
- "Vjejtj' e Diturisë", Hristomathi (Sofje: Mbrothësia, 1902), f. 230.
- "Fjalë / Zonja edhe Zotërinj" (fjalime të Sevasti Qiriazit për ceremonitë e mbylljes së viteve shkollor), Hristomathi (Sofje: Mbrothësia, 1902), f. 291–295, 298–302, 303–308, 308–313.
- “The History of the Evangelistic Work”. The Orient 11. Constantinople: The Bible House, 1910, p. 4-5 (reprinted in The Missionary Review of the World 34. New York: Funk & Wagnalls, 1911, p. 851–853).
- Gramatikë Elementare për Shkollat Filltare (Manastir: Shtypshkronja “Tregtare Nërkombëtare”, 1912).
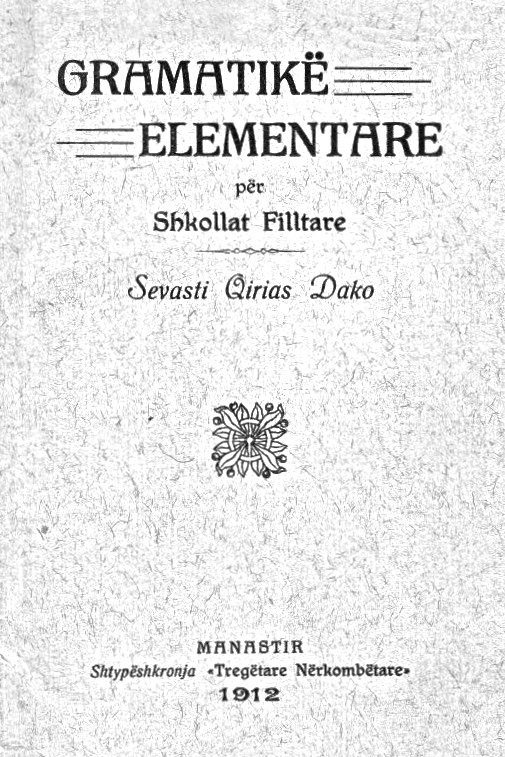
  Sevasti Qiriazi-Dako's Elementary Grammar for Primary Schools, 1912
- Mjeshtëria për të shkruarë letra (Farmingham, Mass: Journal Press, 1917).
- “Kujtime të paharruara” (series of 18 articles published in the Boston periodical Yll' i Mëngjezit from 1917–1918), republished as: "Kujtime të paharruar" dhe shkrime të tjera (Tirana: ISSHP, 2022).
- "Një pjekje me Naim Benj Frashërin", Yll’i Mëngjezit, vol. 1, nr. 3, 15 February 1917, p. 75–77.
- "Petro Nini Luarasi, shtylla e zjarrtë e Kolonjës", Yll’i Mëngjezit, vol. 1, nr. 6, 30 March 1917, p. 176–178.
- "Dr. Mihal Turtulli, ish-ministër i arsimit", Yll’i Mëngjezit, vol. 1, nr. 8, 30 April 1917, p. 236–237.
- "Miss Carolina Borden", Yll’i Mëngjezit, vol. 1, nr. 11, 15 June 1917, p. 335–336.
- "Prezident Mary Mills Patrick, Ph.D., direktoresha e kolezhit çupave në Stamboll", Yll’i Mëngjezit, vol. 1, nr. 10, 31 May 1917, p. 297–299.
- "Miku i Shqipërisë Zoti Charles Woods", Yll’i Mëngjezit, vol. 2, nr. 8, 31 December 1917, p. 236–237.
- "Të çdukurit e Manushaqes", Yll’i Mëngjezit, vol. 2, nr. 8, 31 December 1917, p. 239–248.
- "Spiro Bellkamen", Yll’i Mëngjezit, vol. 2, nr. 9, 15 January 1918, p. 273–274.
- "Mundimi i ndërgjegjes", Yll’i Mëngjezit, vol. 2, nr. 11, 16 February 1918, p. 340–344.
- "Gjaku ujë s’bëhet", Yll’i Mëngjezit, vol. 3, nr. 5, August 1918, p. 142–146.
- Albania's Rights, Hopes and Aspirations 1918.
- My Life (completed in 1938 as an unpublished memoir and published in 2016, Tirana, ISSHP). Translated into Albanian and published as Jeta ime (Skopje: Instituti i Trashëgimisë Shpirtërore e Kulturore të Shqiptarëve, 2016).

== Legacy ==
=== Cinema and literature ===
- The Korça School for Girls was immortalized in Albanian cinema by the beloved film Mësonjëtorja (The School) (1979). The name of the main character, Sevasti Qiriazi, was changed to Dafina (played by Roza Anagnosti). Consistent with the official atheistic and censorial policies of the People's Socialist Republic of Albania, all religion was portrayed as anti-Albanian and the school was identified as completely non-religious (laike).
- A drama entitled Foleja Kombëtare (The National Nest) about the Girls School and Sevasti Qiriazi was written by staff and students of Instituti Kyrias in ca. 1931. This play was published as a book in 2008 with an introduction by Ismail Kadare, but the authorship was incorrectly attributed to Lumo Skendo.

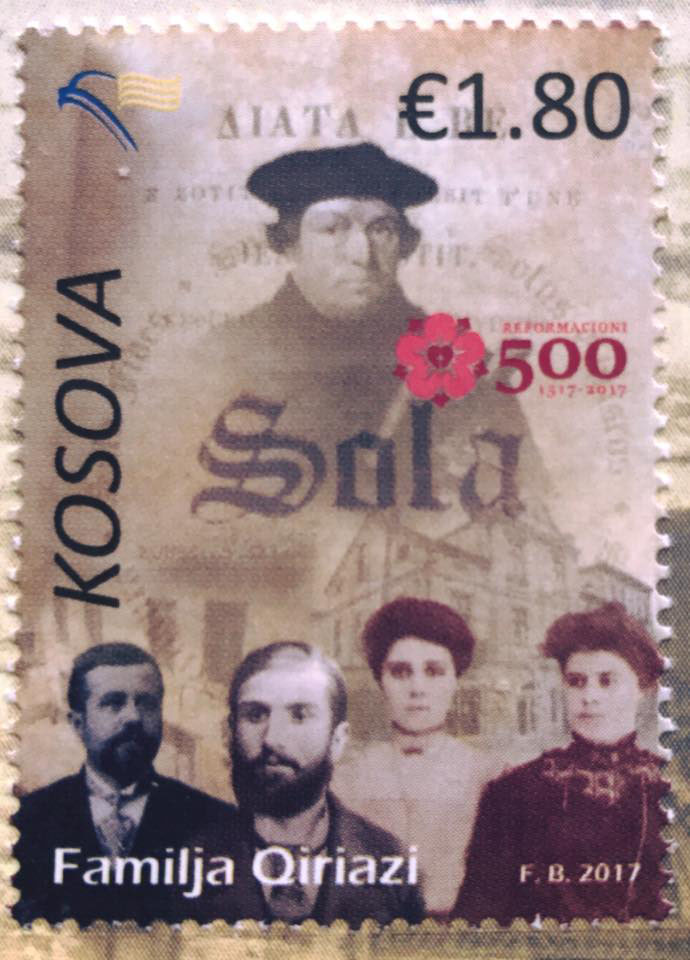
2017 Kosovo Postage Stamp on the Anniversary of the Protestant Reformation

=== Commemorative items ===
- In 2017 Sevati Qiriazi's image was among those featured on a postage stamp by the Post of Kosovo in honor of the 500th anniversary of the Protestant Reformation and its Albanian counterpart.
- In 2023 the Bank of Albania minted a 100 lekë commemorative coin bearing Sevasti Qiriazi-Dako's image.
- In 2023 Sevati Qiriazi and her sister Parashqevi were featured on a 36 denar postage stamp by the Post of North Macedonia.

=== In academia ===
- On 26 October 2016 the University of Korça hosted an academic conference honoring Sevasti Qiriazi and the Girls School on the 125th anniversary of its founding.
- On 7–11 November 2016 the National Library of Albania and the Institute for Albanian and Protestant Studies co-sponsored a symposium and exhibition entitled "Sevasti Qiriazi: the 125th Anniversary of the Education of Albanian Women".
- On 21 May 2021 the Academy of Sciences of Albania hosted a commemorative event about Sevasti's life and work on 150th anniversary of her birth.
- On 25 November 2022 the Qiriazi College (Kolegji Universitar Qiriazi) hosted a historical symposium upon the 100th anniversary of the founding of the Kyrias Institute in Kamëz.

=== In the Evangelical Protestant community ===
- For her role as a Christian missionary worker and "Bible Woman" in Korça, the Albanian Protestant community honors Sevasti Qiriazi as one of the early members of the Albanian Evangelical community founded by her brother Gjerasim Qiriazi.

=== Namesake schools, institutions, etc. ===
- Shkolla 9-vjeçare "Sevasti Qiriazi" in Korça.
- Shkolla Fillore e Mesme e Ulët "Motrat Qiriazi” in Klina.
- The "Sevasti Qiriazi" high school in Tiranë.
- In 1990 the “Motrat Qiriazi” Association was founded in Prishtina.
- In Tirana there is a small road named "Rr. Sevasti Qirjazi" [sic].
- In 2023 the government of North Macedonia approved the establishment of a regional department of the Institute of Spiritual and Cultural Heritage of the Albanians in Monastir, which will be named after the Qiriazi family.

=== Miscellaneous ===
- Sevasti Qiriazi and her sister Parashqevi Qiriazi are known colloquially in Albania as "the Qiriazi sisters" (Albanian: Motrat Qiriazi). They are considered "the mothers of Albanian education".

== Myths, inaccuracies and inconsistencies ==
- The precise year and date of Sevasti's birth is disputed. The year 1870 is indicated on her gravestone in Sharrë. Dhimitër Dishnica reported February 1870, but did not substantiate this date with a source. Robert Elsie cited 24 February 1871 as her date of birth, but cited no source. Whereas, a United States immigration manifest dated August 1904 contains Sevasti's declaration that she was 32 years old, suggesting she was born in 1872. Some government documents from the People's Republic of Albania even record 1876 as her birth year, widely considered an obvious mistake.
- It is frequently reported without citation that Naim Frashëri gave Sevasti Qiriazi the opportunity to attend college in Istanbul, but it was her brother Gjerasim who arranged her education with the aid of Protestant missionaries such as Alexander Thomson.
- It is often reported that Sevasti Qiriazi graduated from Robert College. More accurately, she graduated from its sister institution, “American College for Girls at Constantinople” which was founded by the Woman's Board of Missions. This college merged with Robert College in 1971, 80 years after her graduation.
- It has been alleged that Sevasti was not Albanian, but rather Vlach, but her autobiography refutes this plainly ("I am an Albanian"), as do other sources.
- During times of censorship under communism, Sevasti's School for Girls in Korçë was said to have been completely non-religious (laike), but this myth has been debunked by archival research.
- It is commonly reported that Sevasti organized and attended the first Congress of Manastir in 1908. In fact, her brother Gjergj was a primary organizer of the Congress; she could not attend due to her responsibilities in Korçë, so her sister Parashqevi went as the representative of the Korça Girls School.
- It is stated at the monument by her grave (Sharrë, Tirana, Albania) that she, together with her sister Parashqevi, participated in the Paris Peace Conference (1919). There is no record that Sevasti participated.

== See also ==
- Albanian alphabet
