= Protestantism in Albania =

Religious community in Albania

Evangelical Brotherhood in Albania
- Vëllazëria Ungjillore e Shqipërisë
- Abbreviation: VUSH
- Classification: Evangelical Protestantism
- Theology: Biblicist
- Governance: Autonomous independent churches and organizations, but voluntarily cooperative
- Distinct fellowships: Baptist, Brethren, Assemblies of God, non-denominational groups, etc.
- Associations: Various regional associations
- Region: Albania, with partnerships in Kosovo and other Albanian regions
- Founder: Gjerasim Qiriazi
- Origin: 1890; Manastir (present-day Bitola, Macedonia) (later in Korça, Albania)
- Congregations: approx. 200
- Members: approx. 16000
- Other name: Albanian Evangelical Churches

Protestantism in Albania is a religious community located in Albania that adheres to the Protestant denominations of Christianity. Evangelicalism is one of five officially recognised faiths in Albania. Protestant denominations in Albania include Evangelicals, Baptists, Lutherans, Moravians and Anglicans. The US International Religious Freedom Report of 2022 noted that 38% of the population (just over a million people) have a Christian background. The number of Evangelical Protestants in Albania has risen from approximately 8000 in 1998, to approximately 14,000 in the early 2020s. However, in the 2011 census, 70% of respondents refused to declare belief in any of the listed faiths.

Unlike other official religions in Albania, Evangelical Protestants are not organized under a hierarchy with an official head, but operate autonomously in separate churches or organizations bearing different denominational or non-denominational names. Most, but not all Evangelical Protestant groups are members of the Evangelical Brotherhood in Albania (Albanian: Vëllazëria Ungjillore e Shqipërisë, VUSH), a cooperative organization which views itself as existing as "an instrument of blessing … with the purpose of promoting unity amongst the churches, representing every local church with dignity, and promoting evangelism."

== History ==
=== Spread of Anglicanism ===
==== Early History ====
On August 26, 1816, Robert Pinkerton wrote the British and Foreign and Bible Society to encourage them to translate the New Testament into Albanian. Cyrus Hamlin reported in 1857 that Albanians were applying to his Protestant seminary.

==== The Englishman’s Tower ====
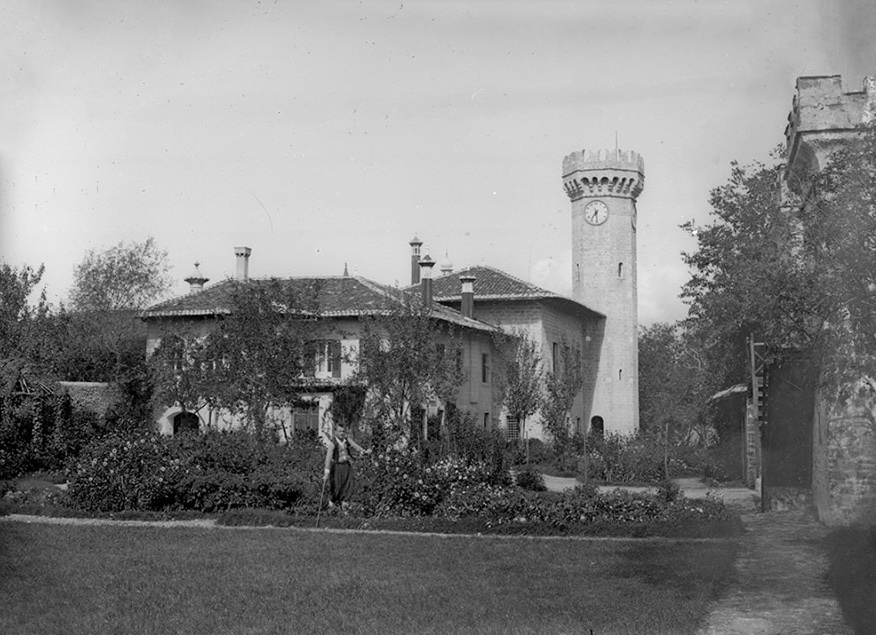
Photograph of the Englishman's Tower by Pietro Marubi (1875)

Built in the late 19th century with funds from English nobleman Lord Alfred Paget, the Englishman’s Tower, or Sahati i Inglizit in Albanian, is the only building structure in Shkodër resembling a medieval-style castle or château. Lord Paget, who arrived in the city during the last quarter of the 19th century, is believed to have undertaken a dual mission: as a “villegiatore” (holiday resident) and as a political-religious agent, promoting the spread of Protestantism in Albania, with Shkodër as his base. In his residence, Lord Paget designed an oriental-style large hall with a carved ceiling, dining room and other sections. He adapted this space into a chapel-like shrine inspired by Protestant churches, with the clock tower functioning as a bell tower for religious services. Paget's ultimate goal was to establish an Anglican church in the city.

His efforts faced strong opposition and the number of his followers dwindled, as local Catholic clergy, supported by the Austrian consul, mounted protests against his religious mission. These objections prompted Ottoman authorities to intervene, halting his attempts to spread the Protestant faith within the city. Consequently, Paget’s residence remained simply a private home.

=== Albanian Protestant Church ===
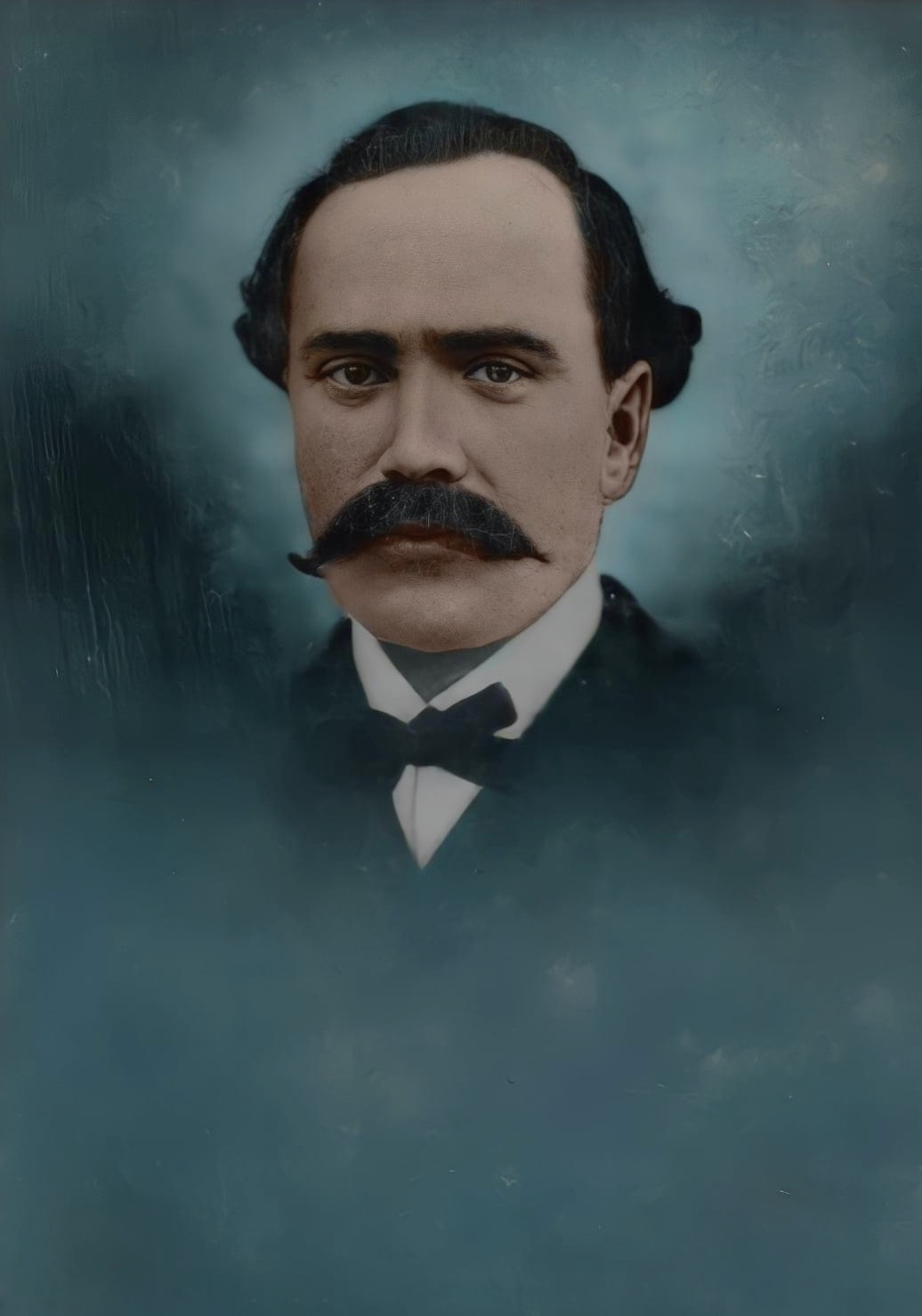
Portrait of Konstandin Kristoforidhi

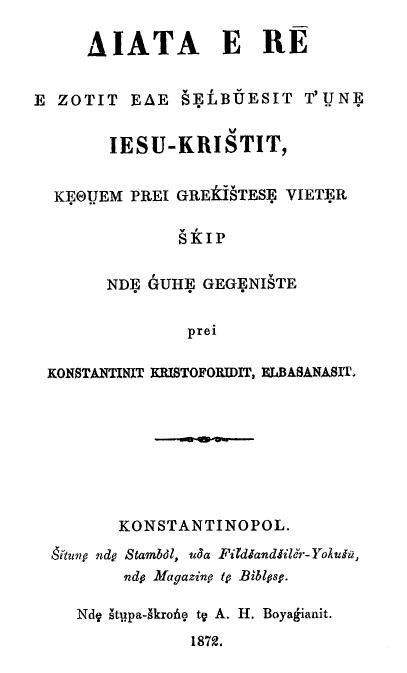
Kostandin Kristoforidhi's New Testament in the Gheg dialect.

==== Conversion of Konstandin Kristoforidhi ====
The first documented Albanian Protestant was Kostandin Kristoforidhi, who left his native Eastern Orthodox faith and converted to Protestantism on his own while comparing Eastern Orthodox, Roman Catholic and Protestant theological texts. He went to Istanbul in 1857, and drafted a Memorandum for the Albanian language. He stayed in Malta until 1860 in a Protestant seminary, finishing the translation of The New Testament in the Tosk and Gheg dialects. He was helped by Nikolla Serreqi from Shkodër with the Gheg version of the Testament. Nikolla Serreqi was also the proponent for the use of the Latin alphabet, which had already been used by the early writers of the Albanian literature and Kristoforidhi embraced the idea of a Latin alphabet. He went to Tunis, where he worked as a teacher until 1865, when a representative of the British and Foreign Bible Society contracted him to work for the company to produce Bible translations into Albanian. He published in 1866 the first Gheg translation of the four gospels and the Acts of the Apostles; for the many years to come, he continued his work, publishing in the Tosk and Gheg dialects The Psalms (1868, 1869); The New Testament (1879, 1869), Genesis and Exodus (Tosk, 1880); Deuteronomy (Tosk, 1882); The Proverbs and the Book of Isaiah (Tosk, 1884).

==== Qiriazi family ====
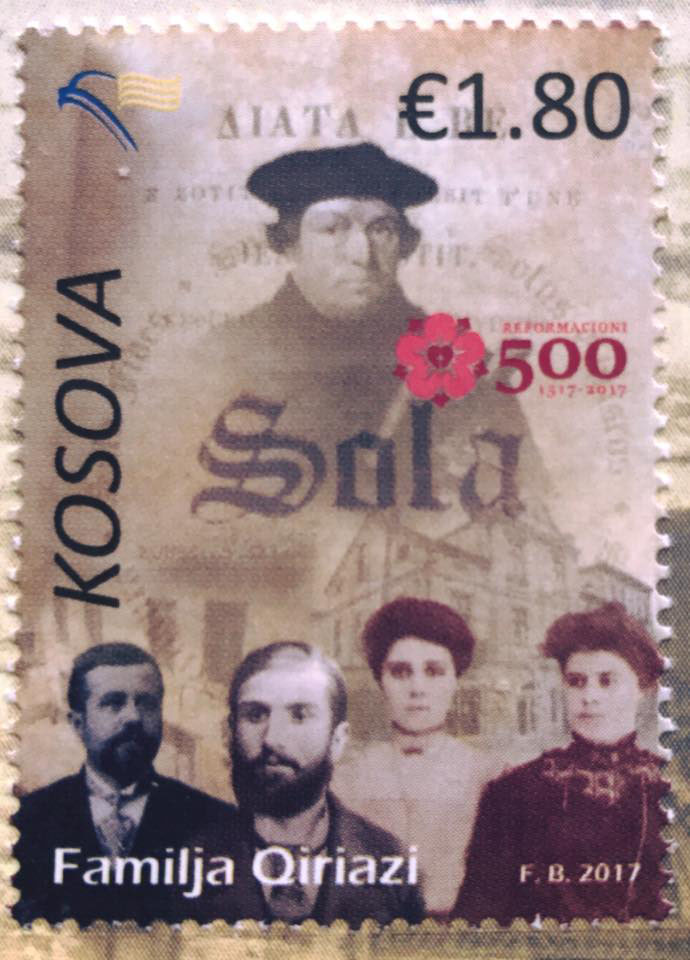
Postage stamp issued by The Post of Kosovo entitled "500 Years of Reformation" depicting the Protestant Qiriazi family and 16th-century Protestant reformer Martin Luther.

In Monastir, Gjerasim Qiriazi also converted to Protestantism ca. 1876-1877, and united with the multi-ethnic Protestant church there. The first two known Albanian Protestant-Evangelical churches were both established by Gjerasim Qiriazi, first in Monastir in 1884 and later in Korça in 1890 (both cities then part of the Ottoman Empire).

In April 1890, Gjerasim Qiriazi was ordained as the first Albanian evangelist and preacher by the American Board of Commissioners for Foreign Missions in the board's annual meeting help in Monastir. The second church among Albanians was opened in Korça. Qiriazi was also the head of one of the first national societies within Albania, named “The Evangelical Brotherhood”. As a result, Gjerasim Qiriazi is considered as the father of the Albanian Protestant Church. Like his brother Gjerasim, Gjergj Qiriazi went on to study at the Collegiate and Theological Institute, a Protestant institution in Samokov, Bulgaria. Alexander Thomson sponsored his education.

In 1889, Gjerasim commissioned the printing of the book of Genesis and the Gospel of Matthew in Albanian Tosk, and the Gospel of Matthew in Aromanian, which were printed by "Dituria" in Bucharest on behalf of BFBS.

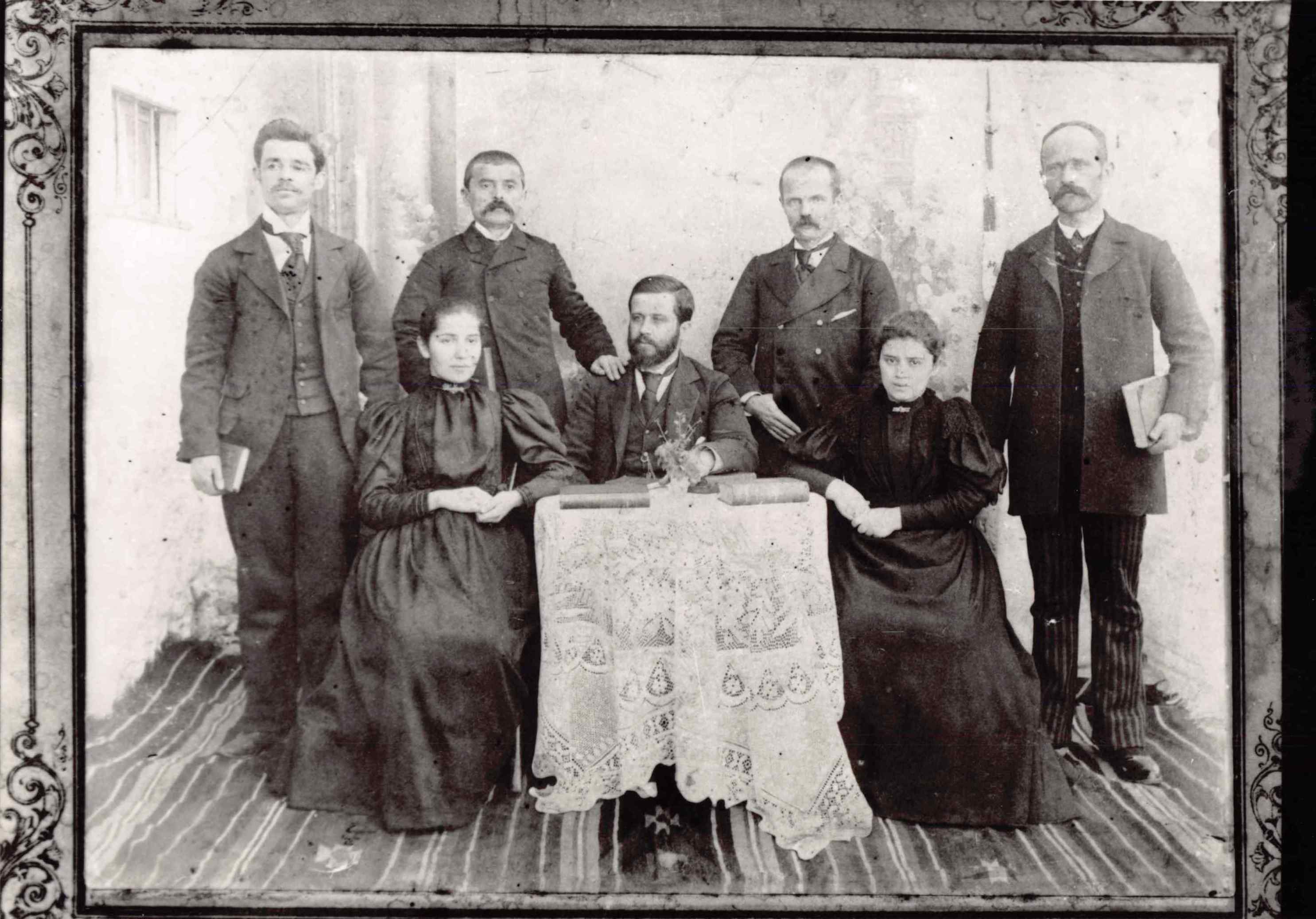
Staff of the Girls School and Evangelical Work in Korçë, Albania (1894)

Sevasti Qiriazi also joined the Protestant community founded by her brother Gjerasim. In Korçë she led Bible studies and prayer meetings for women. She was a "Bible Woman" and was financed by the ABCFM's Woman's Board of Missions and the Bible Lands Missions' Aid Society. She referred to herself as a missionary when traveling to the USA to visit Ellen Stone and John Henry House in 1904. Sevasti eventually solicited the help of the American Protestant missionaries Phineas and Violet Bond Kennedy, who arrived in Korça in 1908 (Violet was the daughter of an American Protestant missionary in Monastir, Lewis Bond, and was Sevasti's close friend throughout childhood and college).

=== Modern history ===
During the Communist regime of the late 20th century, Albania was declared as the world’s first atheist country. Over 2,000 religious institutions were closed. Several religious leaders and preachers were arrested, imprisoned and executed. It was against the law to buy a Bible at that time. When the regime ended in 1991, there was less than 20 Evangelical Christians in the country.

In July, 1991 an international consortium of eleven mission agencies calling themselves the Albanian Encouragement Project (AEP) secured government permission to hold an evangelical gathering in Tirana. The AEP grew to 45 agencies and continued their work there for several years.

== Freedom of religion ==
In 2023, the constitution provides for freedom of religion and conscience. It states that there is no official religion, but officially recognises Sunni Muslims, Bektashi Muslims, Albanian Orthodox, Roman Catholics, and VUSH.

In 2022, Albania scored 4 out of 4 for religious freedom.

== See also ==
- Religion in Albania
- Bible translations into Albanian
- Christianity in Albania
- Roman Catholicism in Albania
- Orthodoxy in Albania
- Irreligion in Albania
- Freedom of religion in Albania
