= Kristo Sulidhi =

Albanian photographer and writer

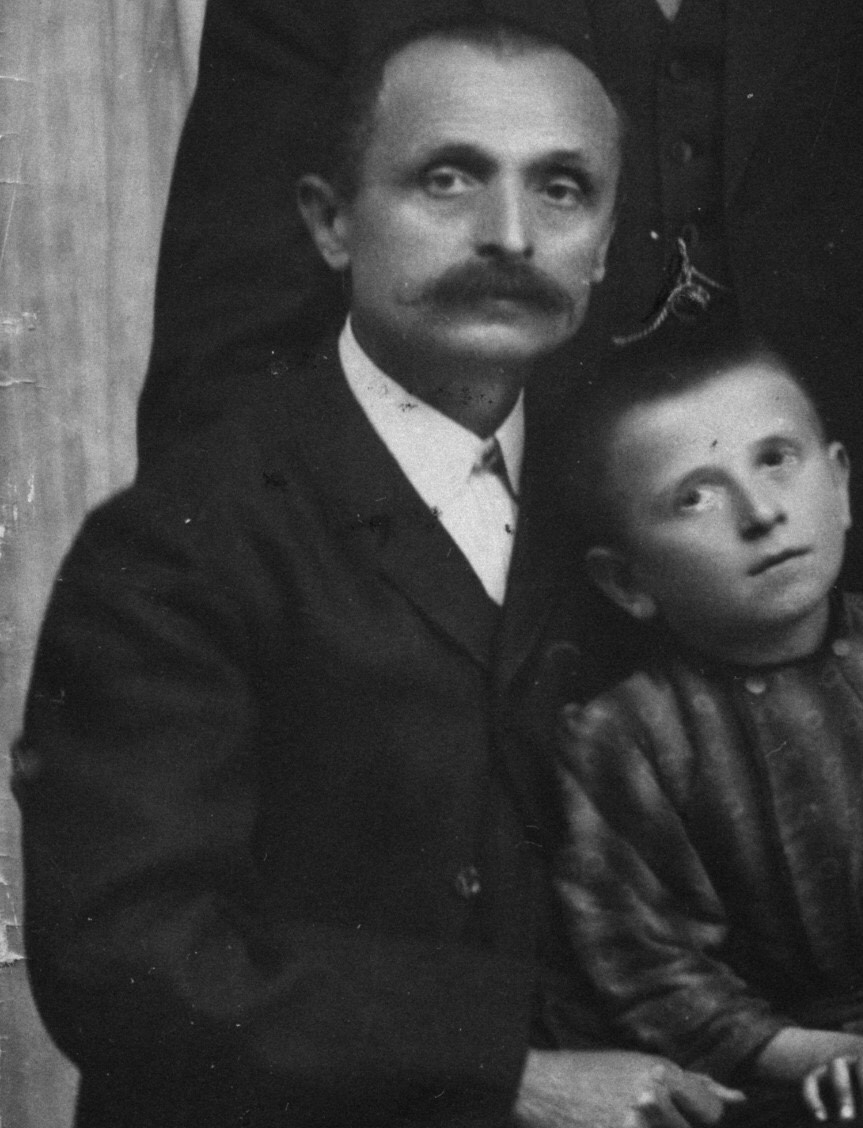
- Born: Kristo Panajot Sulidhi; 1858; Marjan, Vilayet of Monastir, Ottoman Empire
- Died: 1938 (aged 79–80); Korçë, Albania
- Occupation: Photographer

Kristo Sulidhi, full name Kristo Panajot Sulidhi, also known as Kristo Shuli, (1858-1938), was an Albanian photographer and writer of the 19th and early 20th century. He was born in the village of Marjan of the region of Opar (and now part of the Maliq municipality in Korçë County, southeastern Albania). He emigrated to Greece where he wrote in Anastas Kullurioti's weekly The Voice of Albania, (Greek: Η φωνή της Αλβανίας). One of his most important poems was a ballad of 150 verses entitled The Albanians who fight in Gucia. He returned to Albania and worked in Korçë as a photographer. One of his most important photos is the one that documented the first Albanian school, opened in 1887 (the picture dates 1899).

Shuli was a Protestant and close friend with Gjerasim Qiriazi, founder of the Protestant Church of Albania. For this reason he was excommunicated by the Orthodox church to whom he belonged before converting to Protestantism. When his 20-year-old son died, Kristo was left with the choice of either renouncing the Protestant faith, or bury his son outside of the Christian Orthodox cemetery of the city. He did not give up his faith and, crying, buried his son in the garden of his own house.

Shuli is also known for having been the photographer of many people involved with the Rilindja movement, such as known freedom fighters Shahin Matraku and Kajo Babjeni, thereby becoming one of the propagandists of the movement itself. In 1892 Shuli went to Shkodër to meet with Kel Marubi and Kolë Idromeno with whom he shared his experience. Shuli was the brother-in-law of well-known Albanian photographer Kristaq Sotiri, who was Shuli's alumnus. Shuli was decorated post-mortem from the Albanian government for his patriotic activities.

== Gallery ==
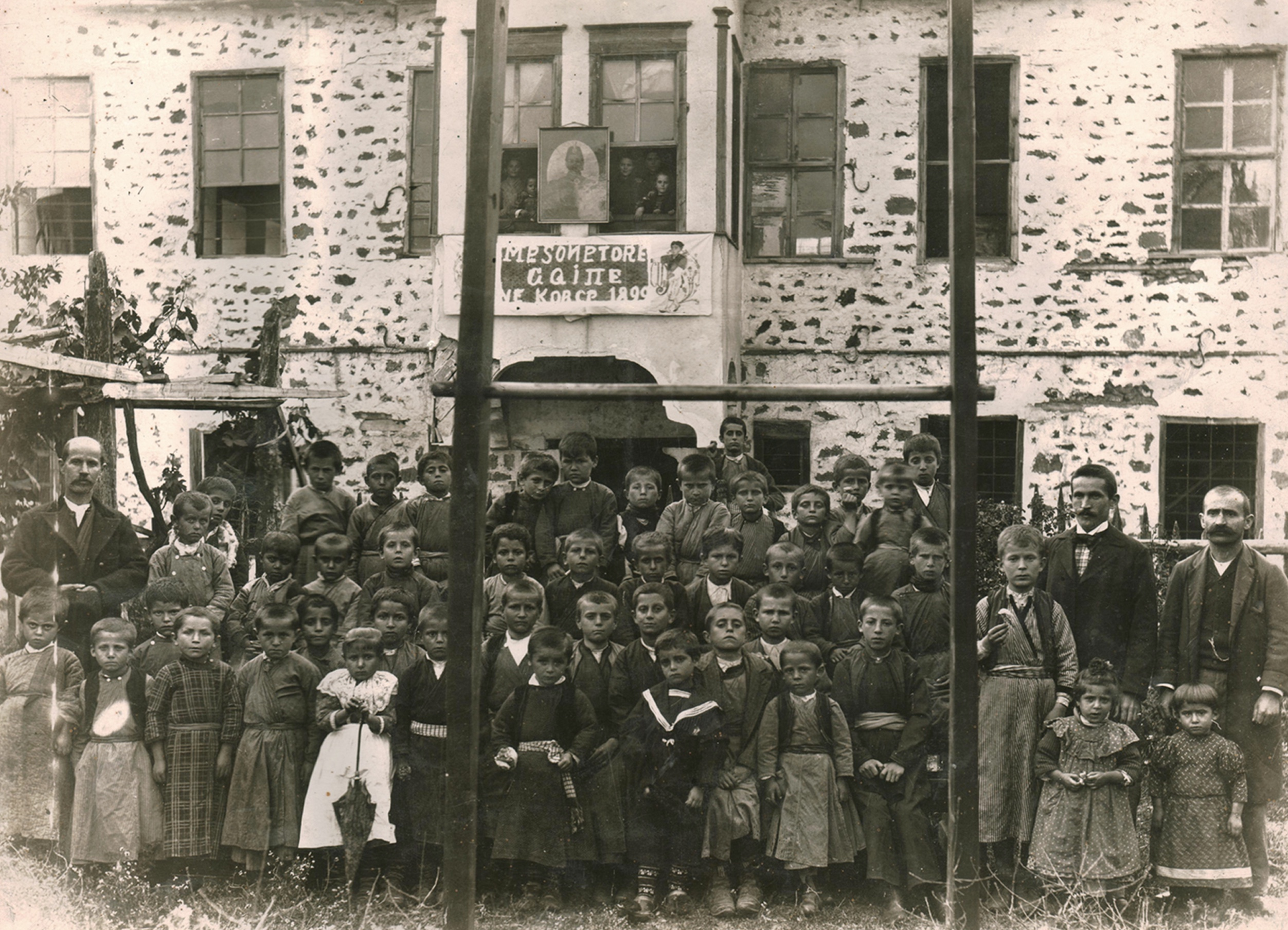
First officially recognized Albanian school for boys, Korçë, 1899. Director Nuçi Naçi, teachers Thanas Nona and Kristo Vodica, and students.

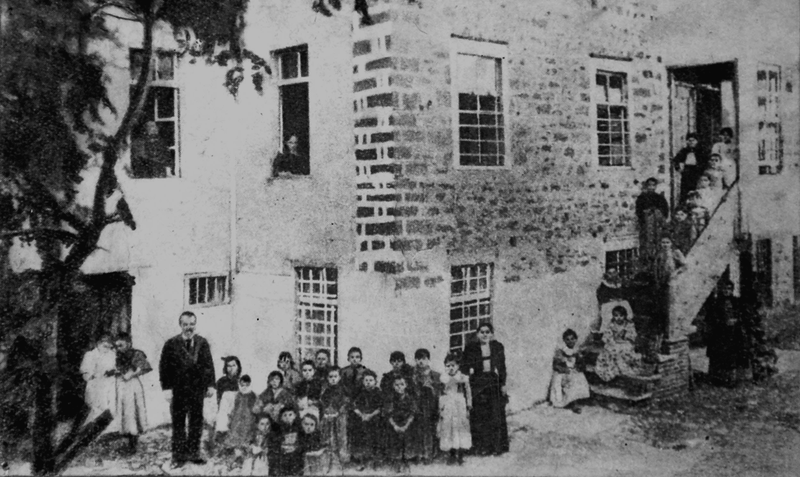
First Albanian School for girls, Korçë, 1899. Teachers Polikseni Luarasi and Thanas Sina, with students.
