= Athanas Sina =

Albanian translator

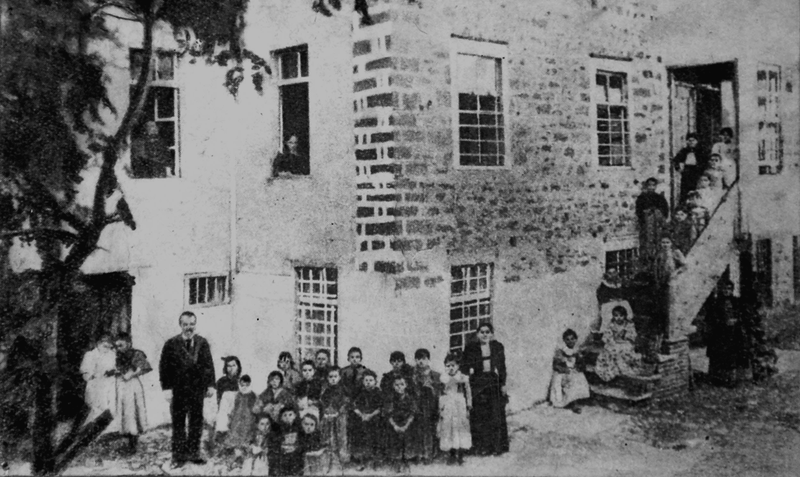
First Albanian School for girls, Korçë, 1899. Teachers Polikseni Luarasi and Athanas Sina, with students. Photo by Kristo Shuli (1858-1938).

Athanas Sina, also known as Thanas Sina, was an Albanian journalist, teacher and activist of the Albanian National Awakening. Sina was the second headmaster of the Mësonjëtorja, the first officially recognized Albanian-language school in the Ottoman Empire. He was also member of the Bashkimi organization, whose alphabet proposal in the Congress of Monastir would become the official alphabet of Albania.

== Life ==
Born in Postenan, southern Albania during Pandeli Sotiri's tenure as headmaster of Mësonjëtorja he was the assistant director and in 1887 became the school's second headmaster. Since 1888 he was the colporter of the Bible Society. Sina collaborated with members of the Frasheri family and the Bible Society of Costantinople. Because of the strict censure of the Ottoman authorities, Sina moved to Monastir where the "Bashkimi" Society established there by the Qiriazi (Kyrias) family. Along with Gjergj Qiriazi he translated into Albanian a, but their big list of Old and New Testament books. The books of New Testament were ready and release in the "Bashkimi" Press of the town in 1912. The Old Testament books were close to finish, but the work was interrupted by the First Balkan War, with the Serbian army eventually occupying Monastir. They shut down the press and closed the book depot. The colportage activity came to a standstill, and Sina returned to Postenan. Upon Sina's retirement from the colportage work, his son Pandeli Sina continued it for several years.

Sina was also the writer of several Albanian-language school textbooks including. In the early 20th century he edited and transliterated in the modern Albanian alphabet Kostandin Kristoforidhi's translation of the gospels.
