= Qiriazi family =

Albanian family during the Albanian National Awakening period

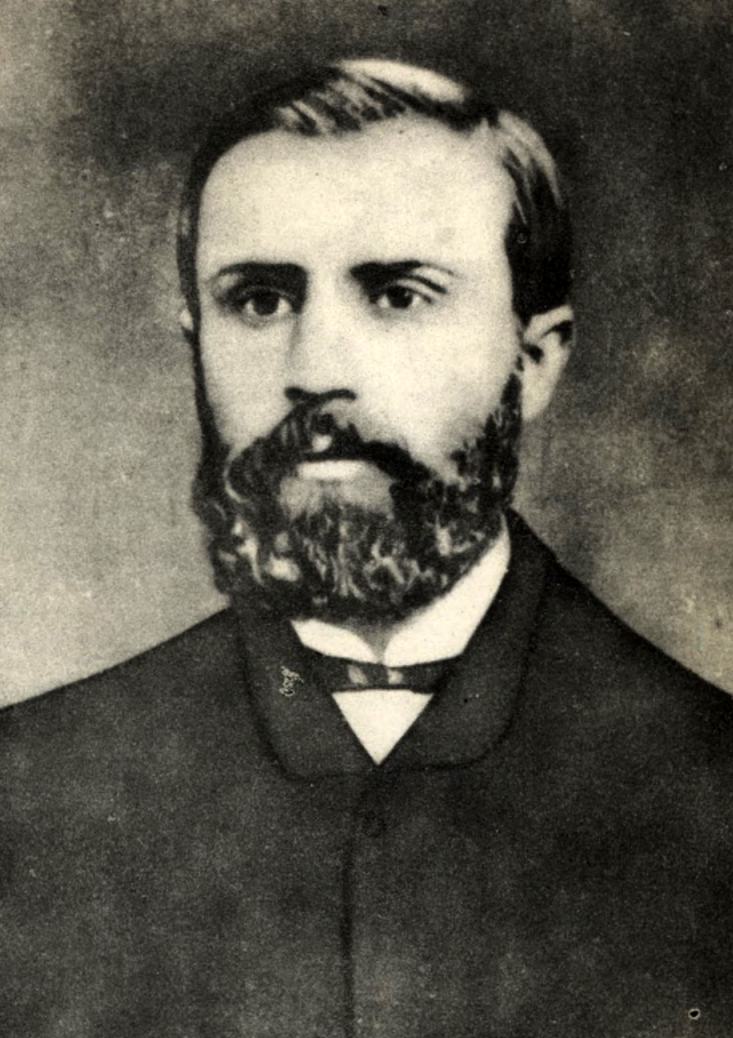
Gjerasim

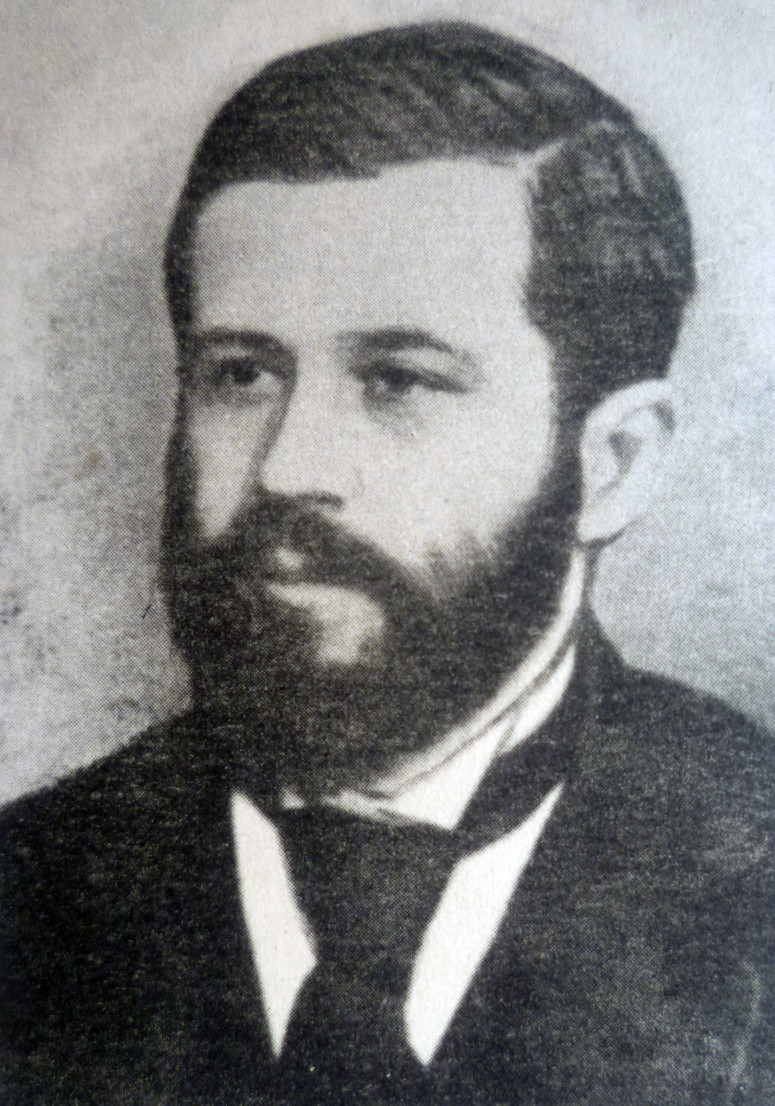
Gjergj

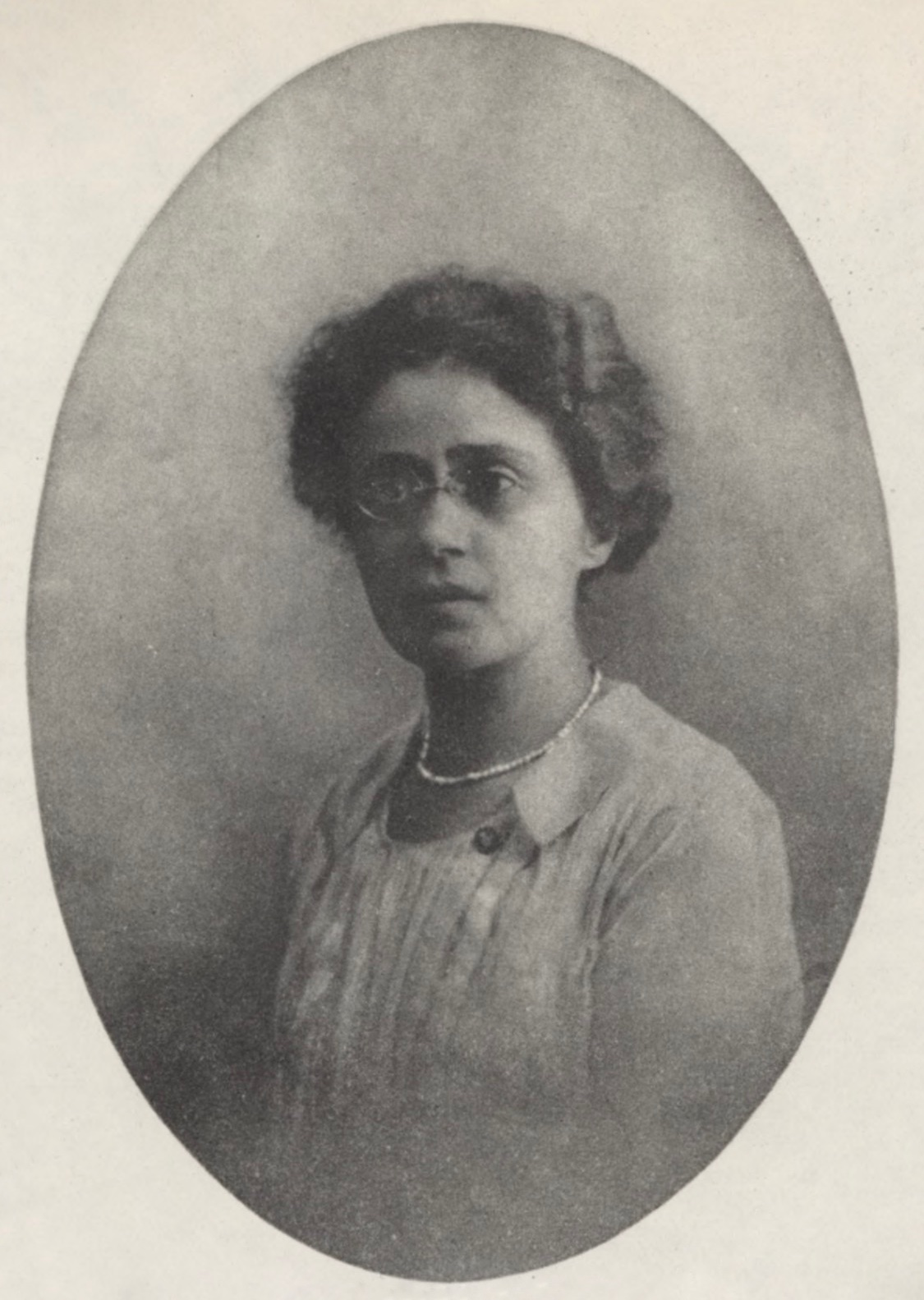
Parashqevi

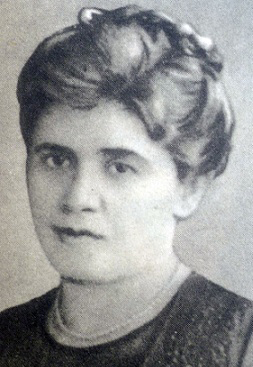
Sevasti

Qiriazi family (Albanian: Familja Qiriazi) were a prominent Albanian family from Manastir (today's North Macedonia). They were educators, translators, publishers, and public figures of the Albanian National Awakening period. They are remembered for their activities in support of the consolidation of Albanian national awareness. They are also known, especially Gjerasim and Gjergj, for their role as early founders of the Albanian Evangelical Movement.

== Members ==
Gjerasim Qiriazi (1858–1894) attended a Greek school in his native Monastir and, with the assistance of his English teacher, the American missionary Jenney, studied at an American Bible college in Samokov, Bulgaria. After four years of training there, he was offered a job by the British and Foreign Bible Society, for whom he began working in Korça in 1883. He also began writing an Albanian grammar and is known to have preached in Albanian. On 12 November 1884, while traveling in the mountains southwest of Lake Ohrid, he was attacked by bandits and held for ransom for half a year. The narrative of his six-month ordeal was translated into English by J. W. Baird of Monastir as Captured by Brigands (London, 1902). The opening of the first officially recognized Albanian school in Korça in 1887 inspired him and his sisters Sevasti Qiriazi-Dako (1871–1949) and Parashqevi Qiriazi (1880–1970) to open a girls’ school. With the assistance of Naim Frashëri they received the appropriate authorizations in Istanbul and on 15 October 1891 opened the first Albanian girls’ school in Korça. The following summer, they moved the premises to a larger building to make room for more pupils. The Greek Orthodox hierarchy was fanatically opposed to the school from the start and went so far as to refuse to bury the son of one of its patrons. On 4 January 1894, Gjerasim Qiriazi died, aged 36, of the pleurisy he had contracted during his period of captivity. He was the author of poetry, songs, sketches, dialogues, and school textbooks. A selection of his writings was published by his younger brother Gjergj in the collection Hristomathi më katër pjesë (Chrestomathy in Four Parts; Sofia, 1902).

Gjergj Qiriazi (1868–1912), known in English as George Kyrias, attended a Greek school in his native Monastir and the American Bible college at Samokov. In 1908 he was a delegate at the Congress of Monastir. The politically active Gjergj Qiriazi was one of the founders of the Albanian language newspaper Bashkim’ i Kombit (Unity of the Nation) in 1909. In addition to his brother's chrestomathy, he published a collection of religious verse entitled Kënkë të shenjtëruara (Sacred Songs; Sofia, 1906).

Sevasti Qiriazi-Dako (1871–1949) studied at the prestigious Robert College in Istanbul with the help of Naim bey Frashëri, and played an active role in women's education. She was the first Albanian woman to study at this American institution, from which she graduated in June 1891. Immediately upon her return to Albania, she was instrumental in the founding of the Korça girls’ school. After World War I, this school was still known by the family name as the Kyrias School. Sevasti Qiriazi-Dako is said to have published a beginners’ grammar for elementary schools (Monastir, 1912) and edited a series of history texts. With her husband, journalist and writer Christo Anastas Dako, and her sister Parashqevi, she left for Romania and from there immigrated with them to the United States, where she collaborated on the fortnightly periodical Yll’ i mëngjezit (The Morning Star).

Parashqevi Qiriazi (1880–1970), also known as Paraskevi D. Kirias, also studied at Robert College in Istanbul, then returned to Albania to teach. In 1909, she published a speller for elementary schools. She later organized both children's education and night schools in southern Albania and helped set up the rudiments of a library system. In the United States, she helped found the Yll’ i mëngjezit (The Morning Star) society and published the illustrated periodical of the same name, issued in Boston from 1917 to 1920. Parashqevi Qiriazi also took part in the Paris Peace Conference of 1919 as a representative of the Albanian American community.

The Kyrias (Qiriazi) family name is widely respected in all Albanian populated territories and many institution bear their name. March 7 is the official Teachers' Day in Albania, in remembrance of the Qiriazi family school opening of 1891.

== Legacy ==
- Sevasti Qiriazi and her sister Parashqevi Qiriazi are known colloquially in Albania as "the Qiriazi sisters" (Albanian: Motrat Qiriazi). They are considered the "mothers of Albanian education".
- Several educational institutions and organizations in the Balkans bear the sisters' name, such as the Shkolla 9-vjeçare "Sevasti Qiriazi" in Korça, the Shkolla Fillore e Mesme e Ulët "Motrat Qiriazi” in Klina, and the "Sevasti Qiriazi" high school in Tiranë.
- In 2017 the images of these four siblings were featured on a postage stamp by the Post of Kosovo in honor of the 500th anniversary of the Protestant Reformation. The official event cover stated:
  Education and emancipation lay at the heart of the Reformation besides theology, a stream that crossed the Albanian lands about 300 years later. In the background of this postage stamp, at the lower part is the central pillar of the Albanian reform, the Qiriazi family: the brothers Gierasimi and Gjergji and the sisters Sevastia and Parashqevi, who among other things bore on their shoulders the spiritual revival, education and emancipation of Albanian society at the time of great historical turning point.
- In ca. 2017, a college bearing the Qiriazi name was opened on the property of the original Kyrias Institute (1922–1933) in Kamëz, Albania.
- In 2022 the Bank of Albania made public its decision to mint a commemorative coin bearing Sevasti Qiriazi's image, to be released in 2023.

== See also ==
- Education in Albania
- Society for the Publication of Albanian Writings
- Albanians in North Macedonia
