= Mustafa Krantja =

Albanian conductor (1921–2002)

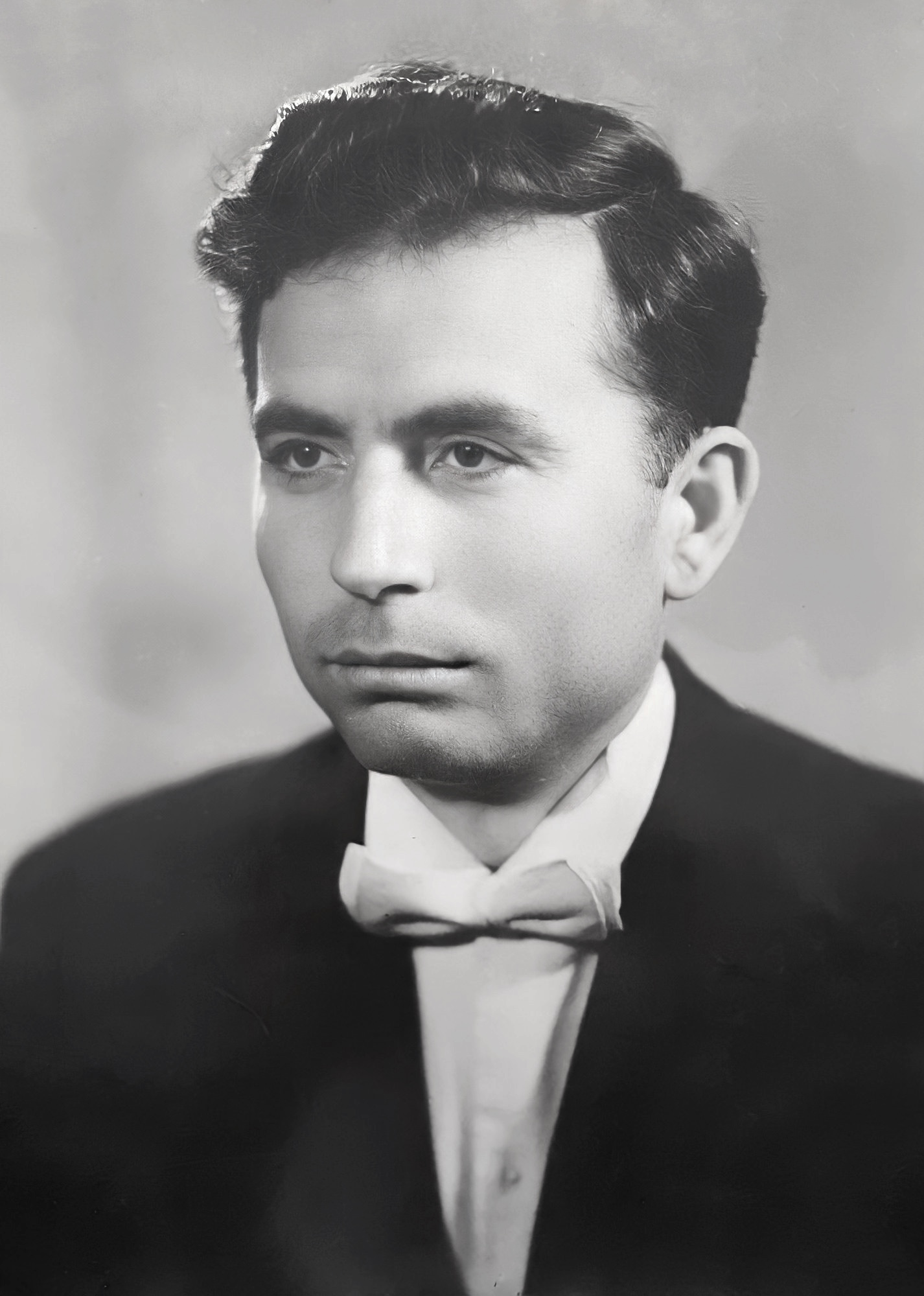
- Portrait of Mustafa Krantja, 1950s
- Born: April 10, 1921; Kavajë, Principality of Albania
- Died: January 4, 2002 (aged 80); Tirana, Albania
- Occupations: Conductor, Composer
- Era: 20th century
- Known for: Being the first conductor of the National Theater of Opera and Ballet
- Children: Ermir Krantja
- Awards: People's Artist Honor of the Nation

Mustafa Krantja (10 April 1921 – 4 January 2002) was an Albanian classical music conductor and composer. He has written about 20 major works. Krantja was awarded the People's Artist award in 1956 and the Dvorak Medal in 1975.

== Early life and career ==
After graduating from the Academy of Arts in Prague in 1950, Krantja returned to Albania and in 1951 founded the Symphony Orchestra at the National Theater of Opera and Ballet. The following decade, in 1964, he founded the Conservatory of Arts which later would become the Higher Institute of Arts, today known as the University of Arts. He was one of the initiators in the establishment of the conducting branch in the institute.

Krantja's repertoire is quite extensive, featuring more than thirty premieres of operas and ballets performed at home and abroad. The first opera he directed was Rusalka by Russian composer Alexander Dargomyzhsky, whose success encouraged him to dedicate himself to the beautiful and difficult path of art. The added success of the opera The Bartered Bride by the czech composer Bedřich Smetana was also noteworthy, which he conducted with the symphony orchestras of Russia, Romania and the Czech Republic. Krantja conducted the first Albanian operas Mrika (1959) and Skënderbeu (1968), as well as the first Albanian ballet Halili and Hajria (1963) and many other Albanian orchestral works.

== Notable works ==
- "Rusalka" by Dargomyzhsky (1953)
- "Ivan Susanin" by Glinka (1954)
- "The Bartered Bride" by Smetana (1956)
- "La Traviata" by Verdi (1956)
- "Iolanta" by Tchaikovsky (1957)
- "The Barber of Seville" by Rossini (1958)
- "Cavalleria Rusticana" by Mascagni (1959)
- "Mrika" by Prenkë Jakova (1959)
- Performances from operas: "The Marriage of Figaro" by Mozart, "Boris Godunov" by Mussorgsky, "Il Trovatore" by Verdi (1961)
- "Carmen" by Bizet (1962)
- "La bohème" by Puccini (1963)
- "Aleko" by Rachmaninoff (1963)
- "Les pêcheurs de perles" by Bizet (1964)
- The prologue of the opera "The Snow Maiden" by Rimsky-Korsakov (1964)
- "Rigoletto" by Verdi (1965)
- "Skanderbeg" by Prenkë Jakova (1968)
- "Commissioner" by Nikolla Zoraqi (1975)

== Awards ==
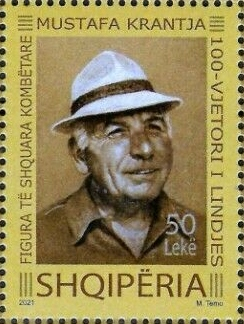
Krantja on a 2022 stamp of Albania

- Order of the Working Class I & II
- Prize of the Republic Class II
- Order of "Naim Frashëri" Class I for artistic activities and for services in Albanian schools outside the political boundaries of the Albanian state.
- Title "Distinguished Artist" of the People's Republic of Albania
- Title "People's Artist" of the People's Republic of Albania
- Scientific title of "Professor"
- Medal of the 50th anniversary of liberation for contribution during the anti-fascist war (NÇL).
- Medal of Honor from the Baku Opera in Azerbaijan.
- "Permanent Honorary Member" of the International Center of Culture, Art and Literature with headquarters in the city of Brindisi (Italy) "Cikal"
- The title of "Honorary Citizen" of the town of Kavajë, Albania.
- The title of "Honorary Citizen" of the town of Cítoliby, Czech Republic.
- Commemorative medal "Dvorak" by the Ministry of Culture of the Czech Republic
