= Kristo Dako =

Albanian Orthodox patriot,politician and educator

Kristo Dako (Christo A. Dako) NK
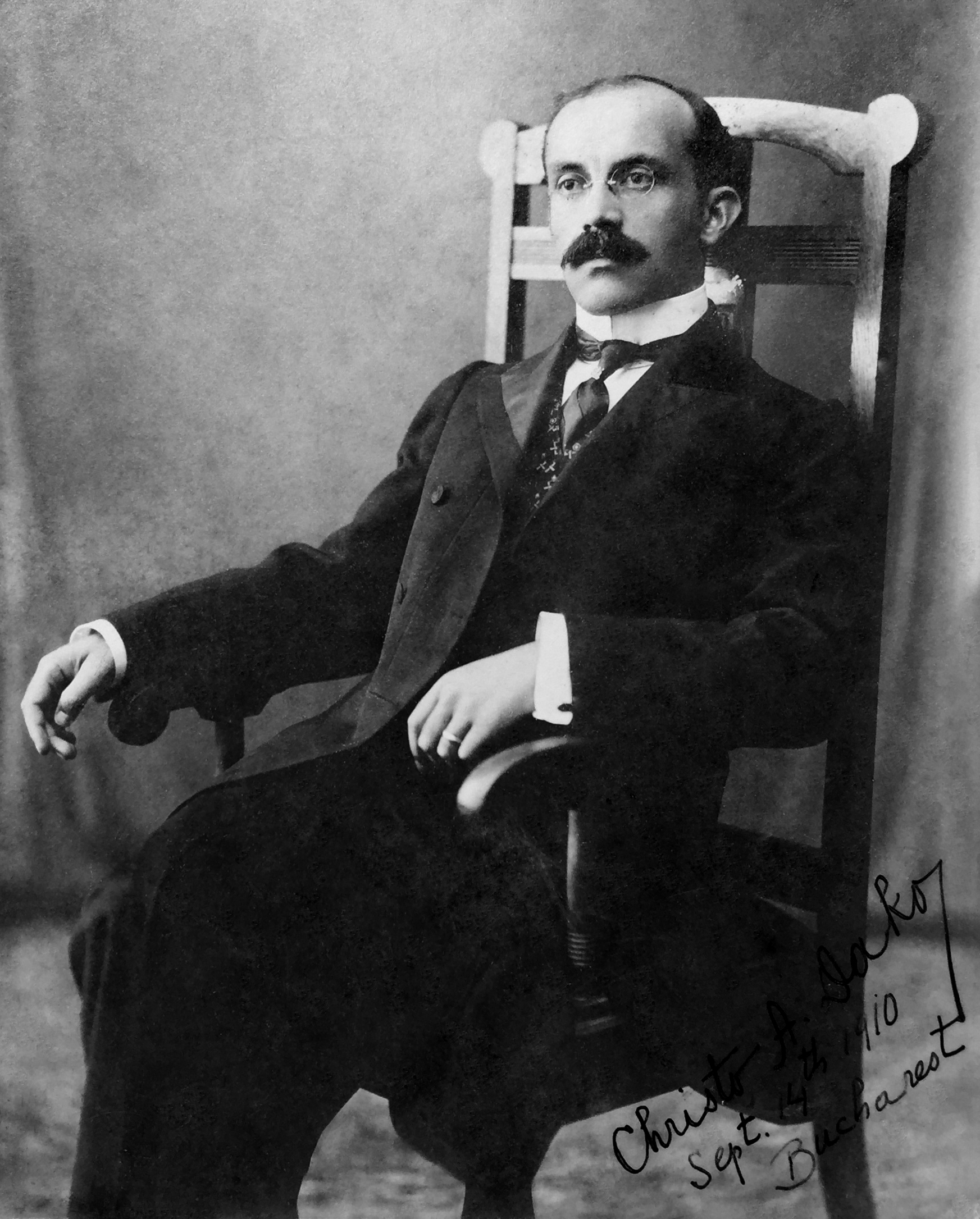
- Born: Kristo Anastas Dako; December 25, 1880; Korçë, Manastir Vilayet, Ottoman Empire
- Died: December 26, 1941 (aged 61)
- Other name: Christo Dako
- Occupations: Politician, educator, author, scholar
- Spouse: Sevasti Qiriazi
- Children: Aleksandër Dako, Gjergj Dako
- Awards: Honor of the Nation

Kristo Dako (1880–1941), son of Anastas Dako, was an Albanian Orthodox patriot, author and educator of the early 20th century.

== Early years and education ==
Kristo Dako (Christo Dako) was born in Korçë, in the Manastir Vilayet of the Ottoman Empire in 1880. He migrated to Bucharest, where he finished high school and later the Faculty of Mathematics. Dako was also a student of literature at Bucharest University. Though he had studied mathematics, Dako's passion was in ancient history. He was the strong supporter of the thesis that Albanians are descendants of the ancient Illyrians, Epirotes, and Macedonians, one of the pillars of Albanian Nationalism.

From 1906 to 1913, Dako studied theology at the Graduate School of Theology of Oberlin College, graduating with a Bachelor of Divinity.

== Biography ==
While in Bucharest Dako, together with Aleksandër Stavre Drenova, founded Qarku i studentëvet shqiptarë (Circle of Albanian students) in 1899. By March 1902 this had become the Shpresa (Hope) Society consisting of young nationalists that aimed to enlighten Albanians on the national question. Dako represented Shpresa at the Congress of the Subjugated People of Turkey held in Vienna, 1902 and presented proposals relating to the creation of Albanian schools, Albanian language liturgy being conducted in Orthodox churches, and release of all political prisoners.

Dako was the husband of Sevasti Qiriazi, Albanian patriot and pioneer of female education in Albania, from the well known Qiriazi family of Monastir. The couple met in Bucharest, and moved to the US in 1907. Dako pursued there a degree in philosophy. He is remembered for initiating and opening the first Albanian school in US in 1908, located in Natick, MA. Petro Nini Luarasi taught there between others.

Dako returned shortly in Albania in June 1911, right in the middle of the Albanian Revolt of 1911, together with Charles Richard Crane of Chicago. There he would be imprisoned for a short time due to his nationalistic activities. He was released with Crane's intervention, and his persecutor Şevket Turgut Pasha immediately removed from the Ottoman authorities. Charles Crane would become one of the few lobbyists of Albania at that time, allegedly managing to influence the American government on lobbying for Albania towards the British during the London Conference of 1912–13.

Who are the Albanians (in Albanian) from Christo Dako, published in Monastir, 1911

Dako was editor of the Dielli magazine and chairman of Vatra, the Pan-Albanian Federation of America in 1913. In 1914, he shortly visited his home town in Albania. Due to later divergences with Fan Noli, he partly retired from Vatra. In 1918 he would join the "Albanian Political Party" (Albanian: Partia Politike Shqiptare). In 1916, he published the short-lived (8 issues) newspaper Biblioteka Zeri i Shqiperise ("Voice of Albania Library") in Southbrigde, MA. Dako later participated in the Paris Peace Conference, 1919. He met twice with then United States president Woodrow Wilson. His wife Sevasti wrote Wilson to explain Albanian national aspirations.

Dako also became minister of education in one of Ahmet Zogu's cabinets. Apparently Zogu showed respect for Dako, and shortly met him in the eve of the Italian Invasion of 1939, asking for US support through Dako's connections. Because of this affiliation, Dako's name would be thrown in darkness during the communist regime of post WWII. His family would be persecuted (including his sister in law Parashqevi) and two sons would be arrested and imprisoned.

One of Dako's most significant achievements was founding the Kyrias Institute for Girls in Kamëz, Tirana, together with his wife Sevasti and sister-in-law Parashqevi.

== Published works ==
The following works are known to have been written by Kristo Dako:

- Cilet jane Shqipëtarët? ("Who are the Albanians?"), Monastir, 1911.
- Albania's Rights and Claims to Independence and Territorial Integrity (memorandum sent to President Woodrow Wilson), July 20, 1918.
- The Strength of the National Consciousness of the Albanian People, August 1918.
- Albania, the Master Key to the Near East (Boston: E.L. Grimes, 1919). (Republished 2020, IAPS, ISBN 978-1-946244-29-1).
- "Albania and its Unredeemed Territories" (map) (Boston: E.L. Grimes, 1919).
- Liga e Prizrenit ("The League of Prizren"), Bucharest, 1922.
- Shenime historike nga jeta dhe vepra e Nalt Madherise se tij Zogu i Pare, Mbret i Shqiptarevet, Tirana: Shtëpija Botonjëse "Kristo Luarasi", 1937.

== See also ==
- Sevasti Qiriazi
- Parashqevi Qiriazi
- Albanian National Awakening
- Paris Peace Conference, 1919
- Albanians of Romania

== Notes and references ==
Notes:

a.	Elsie places year of birth as 1878, while all Albanian sources cite 1876
