= American Farm School =

Coordinates: 40.571°N 22.988°E

American Farm School Greek: Αμερικανική Γεωργική Σχολή

Information
- Established: 1904; 121 years ago
- Founder: Susan Adeline Beers House; John Henry House

The American Farm School (Greek: Αμερικανική Γεωργική Σχολή) is an independent, nonprofit educational institution located in Thessaloniki, Greece. The school was founded in 1904 by American missionary John Henry House to serve the rural population of Greece and the Balkans. The current major educational divisions include the Secondary School, Perrotis College (Κολλέγιο Περρωτής), the Primary School Program, the department of Adult Education & Research and the Greek Summer program. The school's mission is "to educate men and women, especially those from Greece and the Balkans, to become professionally accomplished in the latest aspects of agriculture and the life sciences."

== History ==
John Henry House with his wife, Susan Adeline Beers House, founded the American Farm School in 1904, on 50 acres (200,000 m^{2}) of barren land near Salonika, Ottoman Empire, now Thessaloniki in Greece. The couple had been missionaries in the Balkan region for 30 years. The school was later led by their son Charlie and his wife Anne.

House's mission was to "educate the whole individual: the head, the hands, the heart." The curriculum included practical training in field and garden crops, vineyards and orchards, livestock and silkworm production, and in industrial skills such as carpentry, masonry and blacksmithing.

The first students were Bulgarian boys orphaned in the Ilinden–Preobrazhenie Uprising.

The school hosted many refugees due to the population exchange between Greece and Turkey.

== Schools and programs ==
The Secondary School offers girls and boys rural regions of Greece an accredited general high school education with practical focus on agricultural subjects. The students live in campus dormitories and follow an extracurricular program that reinforces strong traditions in Greek culture.

Perrotis College, founded in 1996 through a major gift of Aliki Perroti in memory of her husband, develops leaders for the global agriculture and food industry. The English-language curriculum leads to the awarding of the BSc degree, which is validated by the Cardiff Metropolitan University (UWIC), a branch of the University of Wales (UK), in international business, environmental systems management and food science and technology.

The Primary Education program focuses on environmental education through experiential learning. The curriculum gives young learners everyday contact with the natural world and with farming, and encourages hands-on experimentation and discovery.

The department of Adult Education & Research offers short courses, seminars, workshops and conferences on sustainable rural development.

The Greek Summer program, started in 1970, is an intercultural exchange program for U.S. and international teenagers. The program is oriented toward community service, as students live with host families in a small Greek village and undertake a project to meet the village's evolving needs. Participants also explore ancient sights of Greece and climb Mount Olympus.

== See also ==
- Education in the Ottoman Empire
  - List of schools in the Ottoman Empire
