= Honor of the Nation Decoration =

Albanian civil award

"Honor of the Nation" Decoration Dekorata "Nderi i Kombit"
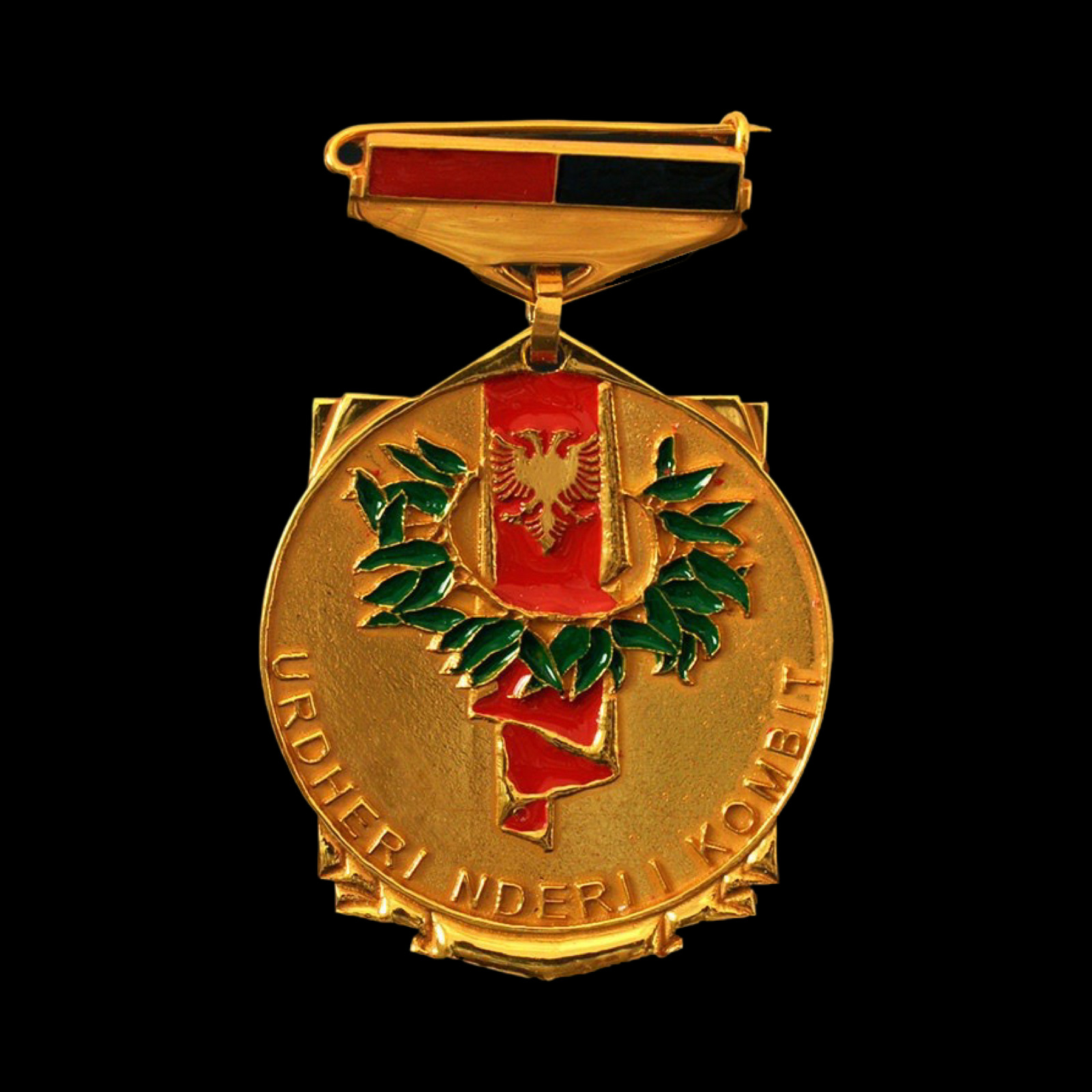

Awarded by the President of Albania
- Type: State decoration
- Established: 28 March 1996
- Country: Albania
- Criteria: "As a token of gratitude and recognition for those who by their acts and good name contribute to honoring the Albanian nation."

The "Honor of the Nation" Decoration (Albanian: Dekorata "Nderi i Kombit") is the highest decoration to be given in Albania, among the Civil awards and decorations of Albania, and was instituted by special law No. 8113, of 28 March 1996, entitled Për dekoratat në Republikën e Shqipërisë (English: On decorations in the Republic of Albania), later amended by law No. 112/2013 Për dekoratat, titujt e nderit, medaljet dhe titujt vendorë të nderit në Republikën e Shqipërisë (English: On decorations, honorific titles, medals and other titles in the Republic of Albania).

This award is granted to Albanian citizens or Foreign nationals, who by their acts and good name contribute to honoring the Albanian nation, inside and outside of the country. The proposal might come from the President of the Republic himself, but also from the institutions included and foreseen in the Rules of Procedures about medals and by Speaker of the Assembly, Prime Minister independent institutions according to the respective field.

== Recipients ==
- Agron Aliaj
- Dhimitër Anagnosti
- Roza Anagnosti
- Pjetër Arbnori
- Francesco Altimari
- Jim Belushi
- Fadil Berisha
- Sabah Bizi
- Panajot Boga
- Aleks Buda
- Abdurrahim Buza
- Hiqmet Buzi
- Tafil Buzi
- Eqrem Çabej
- Rexhep Çeliku
- Kristo Dako
- Ibrahim Dalliu
- Musa Demi
- Sulejman Delvina
- Dora d'Istria (Elena Gjika)
- Petrit Gaçe
- Nora Gjakova
- Zenel Gjoleka
- Kadri Gjata
- Gjin Marku
- Rrapo Hekali
- Anton Harapi
- Tonin Harapi
- Hasan Tahsini
- Osman Haxhiu
- Koto Hoxhi
- Mirash Ivanaj
- Prenkë Jakova
- Ismail Kadare
- Sadik Kaceli
- Panajot Kanaçi
- Bujar Kapexhiu
- Majlinda Kelmendi
- Ibrahim Kodra
- Vangjel Koja
- Sado Koshena
- Mustafa Krantja
- Vojo Kushi
- Kristaq Kume
- Ndriçim Kulla
- Ahmet Lepenica
- Zigur Lelo
- Liljana Cingu
- Marie Logoreci
- Petro Marko
- Kel Marubi
- Murat Miftar Tërbaçi
- Vangjush Mio
- Aleksandër Moisiu
- Avni Mula
- Inva Mula
- Fan Noli
- Robert Ndrenika
- Nexhmije Pagarusha
- Odhise Paskali
- Panajot Pano
- Thoma Papapano
- Muhamet Përmeti
- Zef Pllumi
- Pjetër Bogdani
- Agim Qirjaqi
- Gjerasim Qiriazi
- Gjergj Qiriazi
- Parashqevi Qiriazi
- Sevasti Qiriazi
- Ramadan Sokoli
- Refik Resmja
- Ndriçim Sallaku
- Ferdinand Samarxhi
- Ibrahim Selimi
- Robert Shvarc
- Nako Spiru
- Sali Nivica
- Shyqyri Alushi
- Mark Tirta
- Vangjel Toçi
- Refik Toptani
- Sali Vranishti
- Bilal Xhaferri
- Aleksandër Xhuvani
- Mentor Xhemali
- Jakov Xoxa
- Kahreman Ylli
- Çesk Zadeja
- Vaçe Zela
- Besim Zekthi
- Petro Zheji

== See also ==
- Orders, decorations and medals of Albania
