= Parashqevi Qiriazi =

Albanian educational theorist

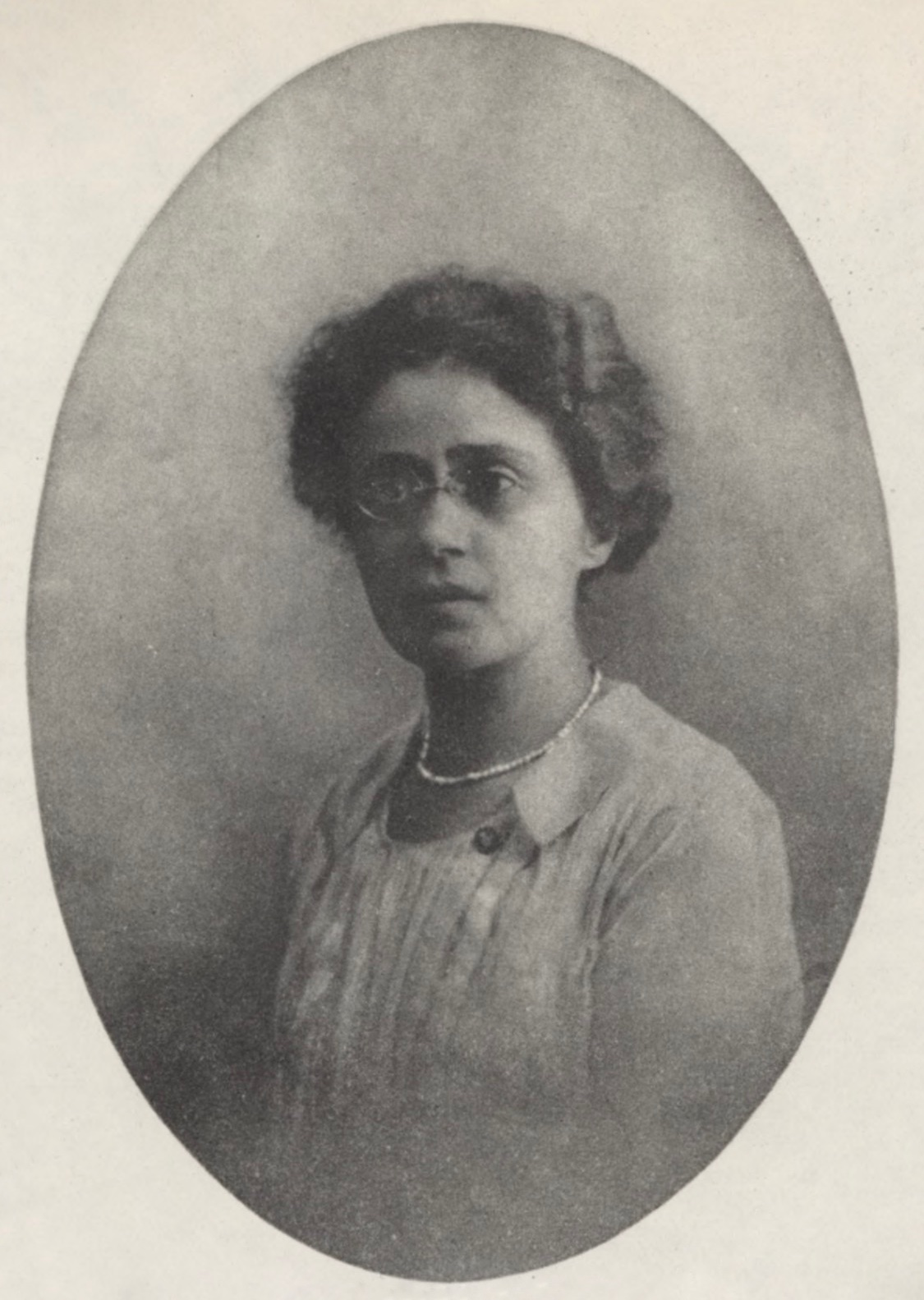
- Parashqevi Qiriazi
- Born: 27 May 1886; Manastir, Manastir Vilayet, Ottoman Empire (present-day Bitola, North Macedonia)
- Died: 17 December 1970 (aged 84); Tirana, Albania
- Resting place: Tirana, Varrezat e Sharrës
- Other names: Paraskevi D. Kyrias, Parashqevi Qirias
- Citizenship: Ottoman, Albanian
- Education: Masters
- Alma mater: American College for Girls at Constantinople (B.A.), Oberlin College (Masters)
- Occupations: educator, publisher
- Notable work: Yll'i Mëngjezit (The Morning Star), Boston, 1917–1920
- Parent(s): Dhimitër Qiriazi, Maria Qiriazi (Vodica)
- Relatives: sister of Tashko Qiriazi, Kostandin Qiriazi, Theofania "Fanka" Qiriazi (Trajan), Gjerasim Qiriazi, Gjergj Qiriazi, Sevasti Qiriazi, Kristo Qiriazi, Naum Qiriazi, and Perikli "Pandi" Qiriazi
- Awards: People's Teacher Order for Patriotic Activity Honor of the Nation

Parashqevi Qiriazi (Paraskevi D. Kyrias) (27 May 1886 – 17 December 1970) was an Albanian teacher, school director, and publisher who dedicated her life to education in written Albanian. She was a participant at the Congress of Manastir (1908), which decided the characters of the modern Albanian alphabet, and was one of the only female delegates sent to represent her nation at the Paris Peace Conference (1919).

== Biography ==
Parashqevi was born in Monastir, in the Manastir Vilayet, Ottoman Empire (present-day North Macedonia). When she was only 11 she started to help her brother Gjerasim Qiriazi and sister Sevasti Qiriazi to teach written Albanian to girls in the first school for girls in Albania, the Girls' School (Albanian: Shkolla e Vashave), which opened on 15 October 1891.

She later studied at the American College for Girls at Constantinople. Upon her graduation in 1904, she went to Korçë to relieve her sister Sevasti as director of the Girls School.

In 1908, she was a participant in the Congress of Monastir and the only woman to be there.

In 1909, she published an abecedarium for elementary schools. Although the Congress of Monastir had decided about the new alphabet, two versions of the alphabet were still present in her abecedary, which shows how fragile the consensus of the Congress still was. However, along with the abecedarium, she published some very well known verses on the defense of the new Albanian alphabet:

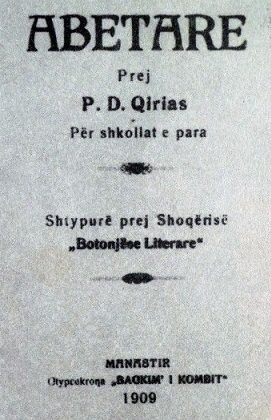
Abetare from Parashqevi Qiriazi

Tosk Albanian

Armiqëtë o shqipëtarë,
Po perpiqenë
Shkronjat turçe dhe greqishte,
të na apënë;
Le t'i mbajnë ata per vetëhe;
Kemi tonatë.

English

The enemies o Albanians,
Are trying
Turkish and Greek letters,
To give us;
Let them keep theirs;
We have ours.

She is also known for having organized teaching for children and night schools in other southern Albania villages and for helping to organize local libraries.

She contributed to the foundation of the Yll' i Mëngjesit association (Albanian: Morning Star) in 1909 and later, when she had migrated to the US, she continued to publish the periodical with the same name from 1917 to 1920. The magazine was published every fortnight and included articles on Albanian politics, society, history, philology, literature, and folklore.

In 1914 she left Albania for Romania along with her sister as a consequence of the Greek occupation of the city.

She later went to the United States and became a member of the Albanian-American community, on behalf of which she participated in the Conference of Peace of Paris in 1919 to represent the rights of the Albanians.

Parashqevi returned to Albania in 1921, after which she followed political developments there with interest, without losing sight of national aspirations. She became one of the founders and directors of the Female Institution named "Kyrias," after her family, in Tirana and Kamëz, in cooperation with her sister Sevasti and brother-in-law Kristo Dako.

In October 1928, at the initiative of the Ministry of Interior, the organization "Gruaja Shqiptare" ("The Albanian woman") was founded in Tirana, with plans to create branches nationwide and in the diaspora. It was created under the patronage of the Queen Mother and King Zog's sister Princess Sanije. The organization aimed at promoting education, hygiene, and charitable activities, and raising Albanian women to a higher cultural level. As a well-educated woman, Parashqevi succeeded in gaining a leadership position in it. Between 1929 and 1931, the organization published its periodical Shqiptarja ("The Albanian [f]"), which featured many articles contributed by Parashqevi and her sister Sevasti. The journal took issue with conservative thinking, championing the women's movement and its demands.

Parashqevi stood as a firm anti-fascist throughout World War II, starting from the Italian invasion of 1939. Because of her anti-fascist views, she and her sister were sent to the Banjica concentration camp near Belgrade by pro-Nazi units led by Xhaferr Deva.

From 1931 to 1939 Parashqevi Qiriazi was named on the International Council of Honour of the Bible Lands Missions' Aid Society, alongside other Protestants such as John Henry House and Samuel Zwemer.

She survived and returned to Tirana after the war, but she and her sister's family then faced further persecution. Because of his past affiliation with Zog, Kristo Dako was posthumously vilified by the communist regime, and the Kyrias families were forced out of Tirana. Parashqevi's two nephews (Sevasti's sons) would be imprisoned, and eventually one died in prison.

The efforts of Albanian scholar Skënder Luarasi and woman politician Vito Kapo led eventually to the partial rehabilitation of the Kyrias sisters. Parashqevi died in Tirana on 17 December 1970.

== Published works ==
The following works are known to have been written or translated by Parashqevi Qiriazi:

- "The Albanian Girls’ School at Kortcha". Life and Light for Woman XXXV, nr. 8 (Boston: Woman's Board of Missions, August 1905).
- "The Development of Schools in the Turkish Empire and an Ideal System of Education for Albania", in Albania, the Master Key to the Near East (Boston: E.L. Grimes, 1919), p. 248-266. (Republished 2020, IAPS, ISBN 978-1-946244-29-1).
- Abetare për shkollat e para (Manastir: Bashkimi i Kombit, 1909).
- Evangjelina: rrëfenjë prej Henry Wadsworth Longfellow përkthyer lirisht prej Zonjushës P. D. Qirias (Tirana: Shtypshkronja "Tirana", 1923).

== Legacy ==
- Parashqevi Qiriazi and her sister Sevasti Qiriazi are known colloquially in Albania as "the Qiriazi Sisters" (Albanian: Motrat Qiriazi). They are considered the "mothers of Albanian education".

== See also ==
- Fatbardha Gega
