= Gjerasim Qiriazi =

Albanian preacher, translator and educator (1858–1894)

Reverend Gjerasim Qiriazi Gerasim D. Kyrias
- Founder of Albanian Protestant Community
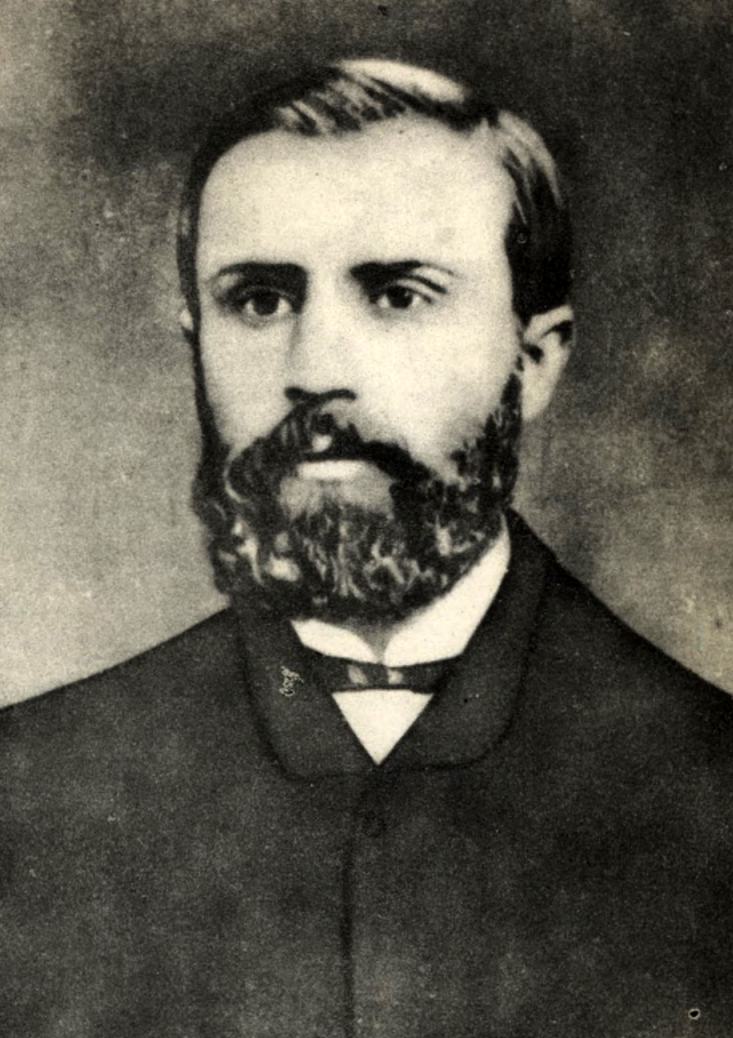
- Church: Albanian Evangelical Brotherhood (Protestant)

Orders
- Ordination: 19–20 April 1890 by American Board of Commissioners for Foreign Missions
- Consecration: by John Henry House, Alexander Thomson, et al.

Personal details
- Born: October 18, 1858 Monastir, Ottoman Empire (modern Bitola, North Macedonia)
- Died: 2 January 1894 (aged 35) Monastir
- Buried: Protestant Cemetery, Monastir
- Denomination: Evangelical Protestant
- Spouse: Athina Mikelidhi
- Children: Stefan Kyrias
- Occupation: Preacher, educator
- Education: Collegiate and Theological Institute (Samokov, Bulgaria)

Gjerasim Qiriazi
- Other names: Gerasim D. Kyrias; Gerasimos Kyrias
- Employer(s): British and Foreign Bible Society, Turkish Missions Aid Society
- Organization: Vëllazëria e Ungjillorëvet
- Notable work: Kënkëtore: Hymna per nde Falëtorët të Ungjillorëvet (1893); Captured by Brigands (1901); Krestomaci (1902, 1907)
- Movement: Protestantism; Albanian National Awakening
- Relatives: Brother of: Sevasti Qiriazi, Gjergj Qiriazi, and Parashqevi Qiriazi
- Awards: Honour of the Nation; People's Teacher; Order of Freedom, Class I

Gjerasim Qiriazi (in English Gerasim Kyrias) (18 October 1858 – 2 January 1894) was an Albanian Protestant preacher, Bible translator and distributor, educator, and activist of the Albanian National Awakening. In the early 1890s he founded the Albanian Evangelical Protestant community and the first Albanian school for girls in Korçë, Albania, then part of the Ottoman Empire.

== Biography ==
Qiriazi attended a Greek school of his native Manastir, Macedonia. He then went to Samokov, Bulgaria, to attend the Collegiate and Theological Institute. After he finished his studies, in 1883, he started to work for the British and Foreign Bible Society in Korçë.

On November 15, 1884, while traveling to Lake Ohrid, he was kidnapped by bandits, who held him for ransom for over a year. This episode was narrated by Gjerasim in Captured by Brigands and published after his death in English in 1901.

In 1889, he commissioned the printing of the book of Genesis and the Gospel of Matthew in Albanian Tosk, and the Gospel of Matthew in Aromanian, which were printed by "Dituria" in Bucharest on behalf of BFBS.

In 1891, the first Albanian school for girls in Korçë was founded by Qiriazi and his sister, Sevasti Qiriazi. He also had a younger sister, Parashqevi Qiriazi, who started to work at the girls' school (Albanian: Shkolla e vashave) when she was only 11.

He died of tuberculosis at age 35. He was buried in the Protestant cemetery in Monastir; his epitaph reads, in Albanian: "Këtu çlodhet i pari lëçitës i Shqipërisë, GERASIM D. QIRIAS, Lindi më 18 tetor 1858, Fjeti më 2 janar 1894, Gjaku i Jezu Krishtit, Birit të tij na qëron nga çdo faj, 1 Gjoni 1:7" ("Here rests the first preacher of Albania, GERASIM D. KYRIAS, born on 18 October 1858, went to sleep on 2 January 1894, The blood of Jesus Christ His Son cleanses us from all sin, 1 John 1:7").

== Works ==
In addition to Captured by Brigands, Qiriazi wrote poetry and Christian, patriotic hymns, and texts used in school books. A selection of his writings was published by his brother, Gjergj, in the collection Hristomathi a udhëheqës për ç'do shtëpi shqiptari (Monastir, 1902). Both brothers co-wrote the song collection Kënkë të shenjtëruara (Korça, 1893; Monastir, 1906).

== Published works ==
- “Captured by Brigands: an Albanian Experience”, The Sunday Home Family Magazine for Sabbath Reading (London: Religious Tract Society, 1893–1894), pp. 277–280, 310–212, 344–347, 357–359, 379–381, 401–404, 428–430, 444–445, 459–461, 493–494, 551–553, 568–571, 590–591, 605–607, 619–620, 667–669.
- Captured by Brigands. London: Religious Tract Society, 1901 (repub. 2016, IAPS, ISBN 9780993424885). Albanian versions: Pengu i kaçakëve (trans. Edmond Seferi). Tiranë: Kartë e Pendë, 1993; Tiranë: Vernon, 2016 (ISBN 978-9928-104-59-5).
- Kënkëtore: Hymna për ndë Falëtoret të Ungjillorëvet (hectograph). Korçë: 1893.
- Mësime të vëjyerë a fjalë shpirtërishte, të folura në mësonjëtoret shqipe të çupavet ndë Korçë (predikime). Kostandinopojë: A.H. Bojaxhiani, 1896. Republished 2017 (Tirana: ISSHP) as Mësime të vyera (ed. Teuta Toska) (ISBN 978-9928-104-69-4).
- Hristomathi më katër pjesë: gjëra të ndryshme e të vëgjejtura për këndim edhe për dobi të mësonjëtorevet shqipe, a udhëheqës për ç’do shtëpi shqipëtari, të gatuara edhe një pjesë nga dialogët të kthyera, prej një mëmëdhetari (edited and expanded by Gjergj Qiriazi). Sofia: Mbrothësia, 1902 (vol. 1) and 1907 (vol. 2) (posthumous publication). Republished 2023 (Tirana: ISSHP) as Krestomaci: udhëheqës për çdo shtëpi shqiptari (ISBN 978-9928-4519-1-0 and ISBN 978-9928-4519-2-7).
- Katiqism i vogël, me prova nga Shkresa e Shenjtëruarë (translation of the Westminster Shorter Catechism with the Apostles' Creed). Manastir: Shtypëshkronja “Tregtare Nërkombëtare”, 1912 (posthumous publication).

== Legacy ==
=== In the Evangelical Protestant community ===
When Gjerasim Qiriazi founded an Evangelical Brotherhood in 1891 for Albanians, Albanian-inhabited territories were still under Ottoman rule. Now that Albania and Kosovo are sovereign states, Protestant communities there, such as the Evangelical Brotherhood of Albania (VUSH), the Kosovo Protestant Evangelical Church (KPUK) (founded in 1992 and 2005 respectively)—and other Albanian Evangelical entities—regard Gjerasim Qiriazi as their spiritual founder.

=== Cinema ===
The Korça School for Girls was immortalized in Albanian cinema by the beloved film Mësonjëtorja (The School) (1979). The character inspired by Gjerasim Qiriazi was "Stefan Bardhi" and was played by actor Gulielm Radoja. Consistent with the official atheistic and censorial policies of the People's Socialist Republic of Albania, all religion was portrayed as anti-Albanian and the school was identified as completely non-religious (laike).

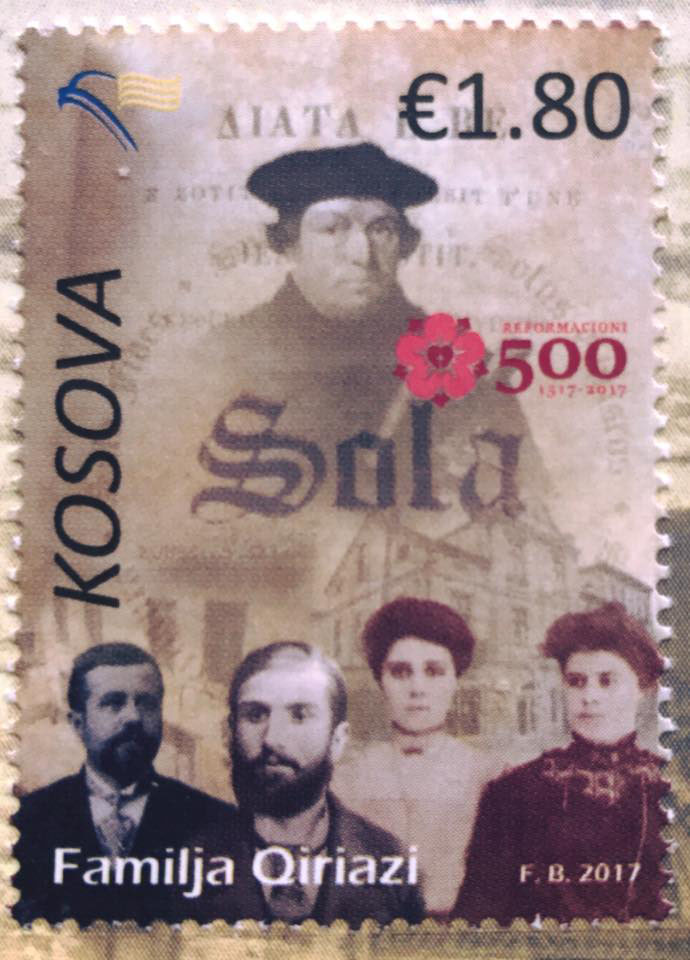
2017 Kosovo Postage Stamp on the Anniversary of the Protestant Reformation

=== Commemorative items ===
- In 2017 Gjerasim Qiriazi's image was among those featured on a postage stamp by the Post of Kosovo in honor of the 500th anniversary of the Protestant Reformation and its Albanian counterpart.

=== In academia ===
- On 26 October 2016 the University of Korça hosted an academic conference honoring Gjerasim and Sevasti Qiriazi and the Girls School on the 125th anniversary of its founding.
- On 14–16 January 1994 in Tirana, in commemoration of the 100th anniversary of Gjerasim Qiriazi's death, the Evangelical Brotherhood of Albania, in cooperation with Albania's State Archives and the League of Writers, sponsored an academic symposium with ten Albanian and foreign guest speakers (professors and institutional representatives).

=== Namesake schools, institutions, etc. ===
- The GDQ International Christian School in Tirana.
- In Tirana there is a road named "Rr. Gjerasim Qirjazi" [sic].
- In 2023 the government of North Macedonia approved the establishment of a regional department of the Institute of Spiritual and Cultural Heritage of the Albanians in Monastir, which will be named after the Qiriazi family.

== Awards ==
- Mësuesi i Popullit (Teacher of the People) (Albania), 1987.
- Urdhri i Lirisë i Klasit të Parë (First Class Order of Freedom) (Albania), 1992.
- Nderi i Kombit (Honor of the Nation) (Albania), 2017.
