= Florence A. Fensham =

Florence Fensham (May 25, 1861 – February 15, 1912) was a suffragist and the first woman to receive a seminary degree from the Congregational Church.

== Early life and education ==
Fensham was born in New York. Her parents were Lambert and Sarah Bartel Simmons.

She attended school in Edinburgh, Cambridge, and Oxford. In Edinburgh, she studied under Patrick Geddes, and then she studied history in Cambridge with J. Rendel Harris. She then began studying theology and missionary work at Mansfield College in Oxford.

On May 9, 1902, Fensham received a Bachelor of Divinity from the Fisk theological seminary in Chicago; this made her the first woman to receive a seminary degree from the Congregational Church. The New York Times reported her achievement in an article entitled "Unusual Honor to a Woman".

== Career ==
In 1883, Fensham became the dean of the American college for girls in Constantinople. Among other things, she taught Old Testament Literature at the college.

Fensham became dean of the women's college at Beloit College.

She is an author of A Modern Crusade in the Turkish Empire, a book she wrote with Mary Ely Lyman and Mrs. H. B. Humphrey.
