= Post Office of Kosovo =

State postal service in Kosovo

Post of Kosovo Posta e Kosovës Пошта Косова / Pošta Kosova
- Industry: Postal service
- Founded: 1959, 2011
- Founder: Government of Kosovo
- Headquarters: Pristina, Kosovo
- Area served: Kosovo
- Key people: Nora Rraci, CEO
- Owner: Government of Kosovo
- Number of employees: 937 (2024)
- Website: postakosoves.com

Post of Kosovo (Albanian: Posta e Kosovës, Serbian: Пошта Косова, Pošta Kosova) is the publicly owned company and the postal-service operator of the Republic of Kosovo. It was founded on 21 December 1959 as part of the Kosovo Post, Telephone and Telegraph (PTT) operator. Following the Kosovo war, it operated as business unit of the Post and Telecommunication of Kosovo, which split into two companies in 2011.

== Gallery ==
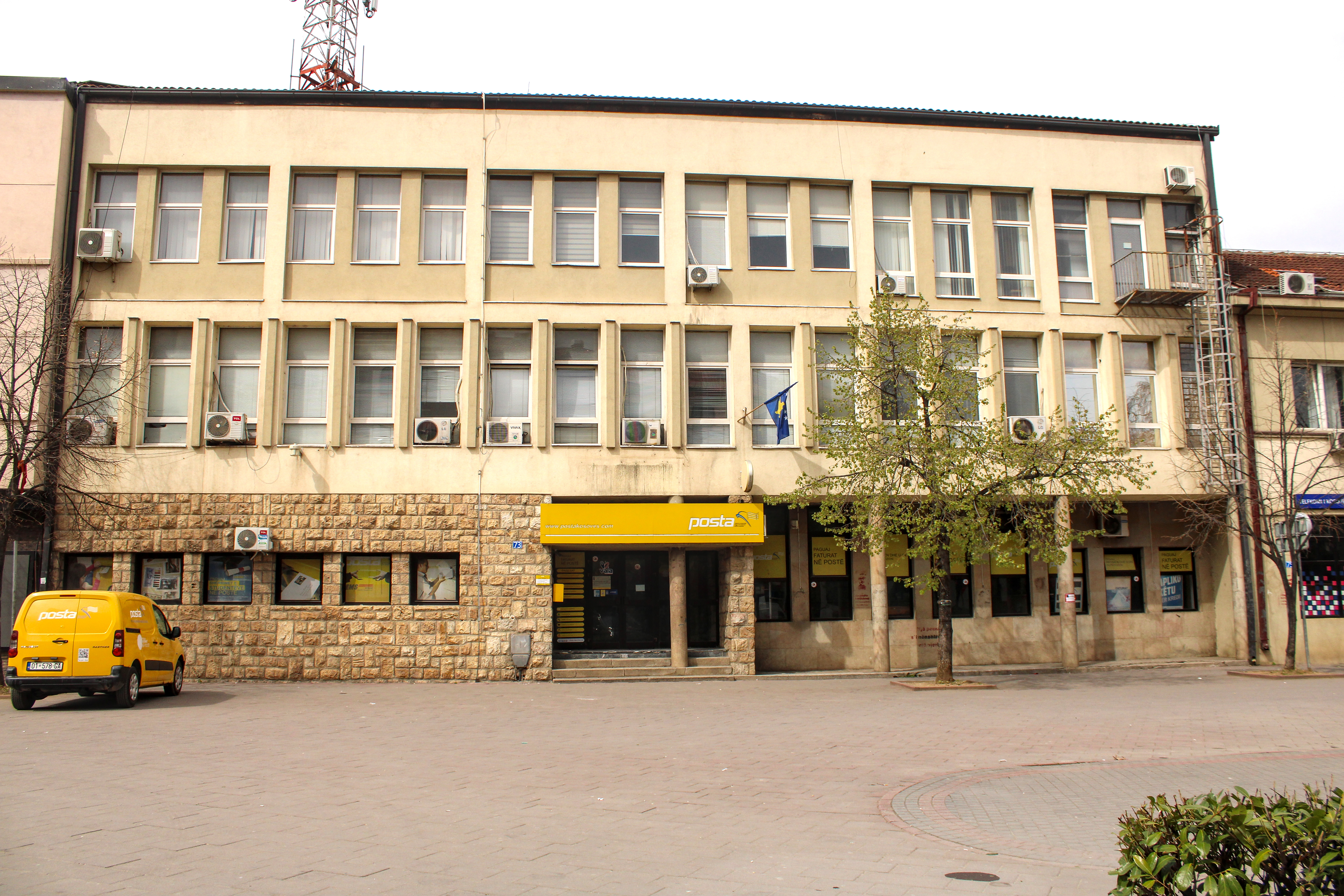
Main building of the Post in Peja

== See also ==
- Postal codes in Kosovo
