= Gjergj Qiriazi =

Albanian writer and publisher

Gjergj Qiriazi George Kyrias
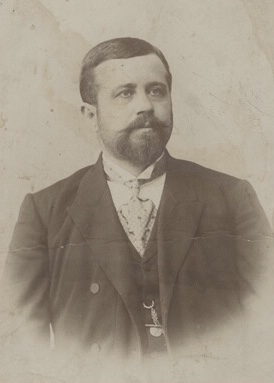
- Gjergj Qiriazi
- Born: 27 May 1868; Manastir, Vilayet of Monastir, Ottoman Empire (present-day Bitola, North Macedonia)
- Died: 30 December 1912 (aged 44); Manastir, Vilayet of Monastir, Ottoman Empire (present-day Bitola, North Macedonia)
- Other name: George Kyrias
- Citizenship: Ottoman
- Known for: Christian Literature; Albanian School in Korçë "Bashkim' i Kombit" newspaper Congress of Monastir
- Notable work: Kënkë të shenjtëruara (Monastir, 1906)
- Parent(s): Dhimitër Qiriazi (1836–1904), Maria Qiriazi (Vodica) (1841–1912)
- Relatives: brother of Tashko Qiriazi, Kostandin Qiriazi, Theofania "Fanka" Qiriazi (Trajan), Gjerasim Qiriazi, Sevasti Qiriazi, Kristo Qiriazi, Naum Qiriazi, Perikli "Pandi" Qiriazi, and Parashqevi Qiriazi
- Awards: Honor of the Nation

Gjergj Qiriazi, known as George D. Kyrias and in Bulgarian Г. Д. Кириас (27 May 1868 – 30 December 1912), was an Albanian patriot, author, educator, translator, Protestant Bible distributor, organizer of the First Congress of Monastir (1908), and activist of the Albanian National Awakening.

== Early years and education ==
Gjergj Qiriazi was born in Monastir (modern Bitola), Ottoman Empire (now North Macedonia), where he attended school.

Like his brother Gjerasim, he went on to study at the Collegiate and Theological Institute, a Protestant institution in Samokov, Bulgaria. Alexander Thomson sponsored his education. He attended the school in 1885–1889, but left Bulgaria before graduating, to avoid mandatory conscription into the Bulgarian army.

== Biography ==
He worked for the American Bible Society in Salonica, and then for the British and Foreign Bible Society, and took over the direction of the first Albanian girls' school in Korçë upon the death of his brother. In 1908 he was the president of the Albanian Bashkimi club in Monastir and later became vice-president. He served as secretary of the Bulgarian Evangelical Church of Bitola. In 1908, he was a delegate at the Congress of Monastir. Qiriazi also worked as an interpreter at the Austro-Hungarian consulate in Bitola. A Turkish language high school (idadiye) for boys was created in 1908 and Qiriazi was appointed as a teacher of the Albanian language. In 1909, the Young Turk government planned to assassinate Qiriazi for his involvement in the Albanian national movement.

Gjergj Qiriazi was one of the founders of the Albanian printing press Bashkimi i Kombit. He published two volumes of literature, namely Hristomathi a udhëheqës për ç'do shtëpi shqiptari (Sofia, 1902 and 1907), which included writings and translations of his brother Gjerasim and sister Sevasti. He also expanded his brother's hymnbook Kënkëtore: hymna për ndë falëtoret të ungjillorëvet (Korça, 1893) and republished it in 1906 as Kënkë të shenjtëruara për falëtorët shqipe (Monastir, 1906).

Qiriazi also translated John Bunyan's Pilgrim's Progress as Udhëtari, printed in 1927 by Dhori Koti publishers.

== Published works ==
- Udhëtari nga kjo Botë ndë tjetërën, a Udha e të Krishterit nga qytet i humbjes gjer ndë qytet të Qiellit, e treguarë si ëndërë prej Jovan Benjian (translated from The Pilgrim's Progress, with introduction, in 1894). Korçë: Dhori Koti, 1927. Republished in original (ISBN 978-9928-4519-4-1) and with updated spelling (ISBN 978-9928-4519-3-4) – Tirana: Instituti për Studime Shqiptare dhe Protestante, 2018–2019.
- Fisika. Bukuresht: Dituria, 1899.
- "Shqiponja". Albania, 1900, nr. 11, dhjetor.
- "Nevojat e Shqipërisë: ca mentime". Albania, 1901, nr. 1, 31 janar.
- "Një udhë[tim] në Shqipëri" Albania, 1901, nr. 5, maj.
- "Urtësia e dituria". Albania, 1901, nr. 9, shtator.
- "Zër' i skolisë". Albania, 1901, nr. 10, tetor.
- Hristomathi më katër pjesë: gjëra të ndryshme e të vëgjejtura për këndim edhe për dobi të mësonjëtorevet shqipe, a udhëheqës për ç’do shtëpi shqipëtari, të gatuara edhe një pjesë nga dialogët të kthyera, prej një mëmëdhetari (editor, co-author with Gjerasim Qiriazi). Sofia: Mbrothësia, 1902 (vol. 1) and 1907 (vol. 2). Republished 2023 (Tirana: ISSHP) as Krestomaci: udhëheqës për çdo shtëpi shqiptari (ISBN 978-9928-4519-1-0 and ISBN 978-9928-4519-2-7).
- "Fati i Shqipërisë". Albania, 1903, nr. 7, korrik.
- "Shkaku i të mos mbrothësuarit të shkronjave shqip në Shqipëri". Kalendari Kombiar 1905, IX. Sofje, 49-61.
- "Arësim i gravet". Drita, Sofje, nr. 82, 9 gusht 1906.
- Kënkë të Shenjtëruara për falëtoret shqipe (të kthyera prej anglishtesë, gerqishtesë edhe bullgarishtesë). Sofia: Mbrothësia (Kristo Luarasi), 1906.
- "Nevojat që kemi për të qytetëruarë Shqipërinë me anën e diturisë". Korça, nr. 3, 7 janar 1909.
- "Nevoja për të përhapurë mjeshtërinë ndë Shqipëri". Korça, nr. 6, 18 shkurt 1909.
- Këngë të shenjtëruara për falëtoret shqipe. Korçë: Dhori Koti, 1927.

== See also ==
- Kyrias Family
