= John Henry House =

American missionary (1845-1936)

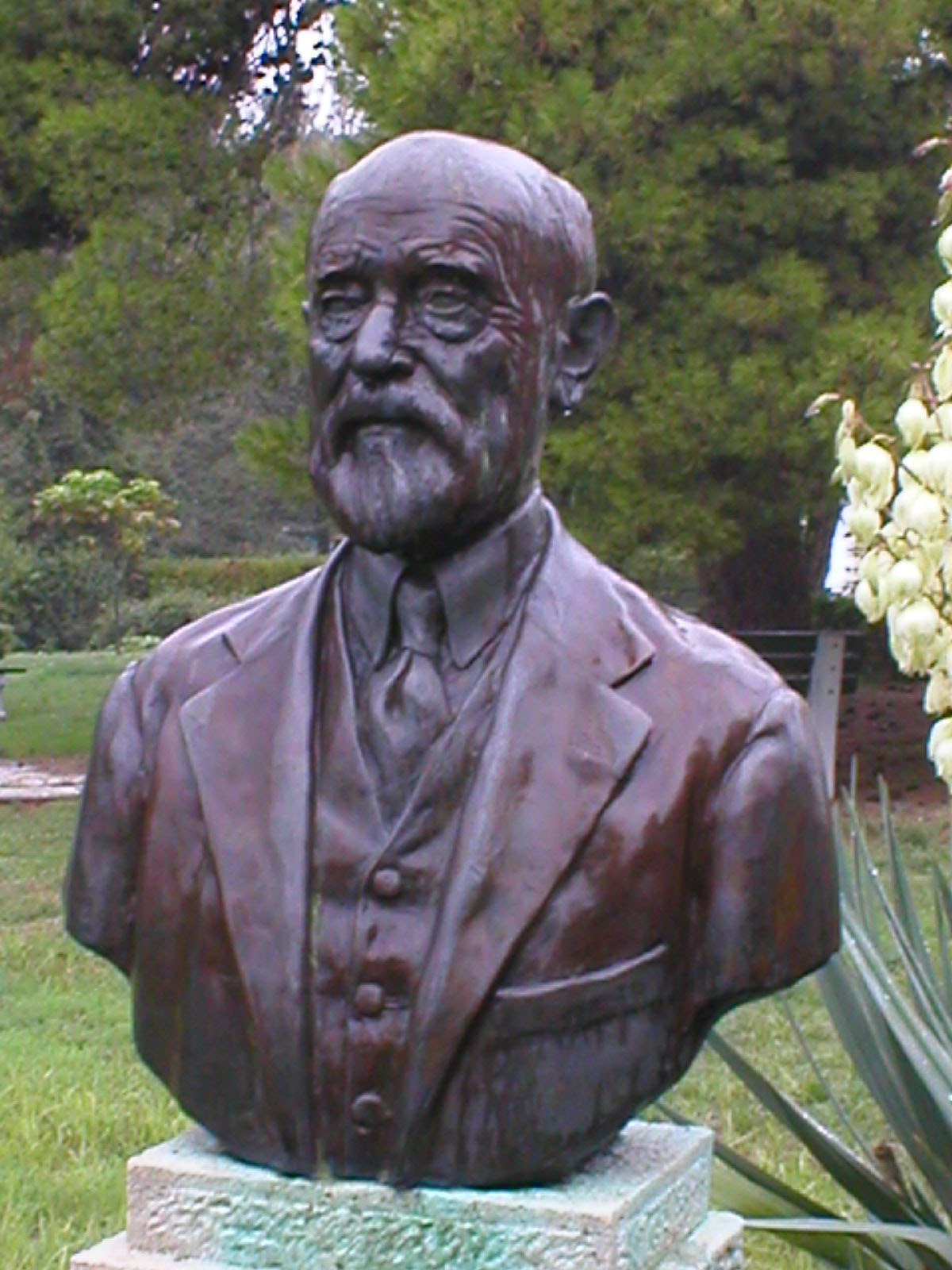
- Bust of John Henry House in front of James Hall at the American Farm School in Thessaloniki, Greece
- Born: John Henry House; May 29, 1845; Painesville, Ohio, U.S.
- Died: April 19, 1936 (aged 90); Thessaloniki, Greece
- Education: Doctor of Divinity, Western Reserve University
- Occupation(s): Missionary, teacher
- Spouse: Susan Adeline Beers
- Children: 7

John Henry House was a missionary known for his work teaching agricultural techniques to Bulgarian and later Greek peasants.

House was born on May 29, 1845, in Painesville, Ohio, to John House IV, a blacksmith, farmer, and abolitionist, and Jane Electa Mosely, both originally from Westfield, Massachusetts.

He graduated from Western Reserve University in 1868 and received his Bachelor of Divinity from Union Theological Seminary in 1871.

House married Susan Adeline Beers, daughter of Henry Newell Beers and Adeline Bigelow, on September 17, 1872. That same year they left America to become missionaries in Eski Zagra, European Turkey (now Stara Zagora, Bulgaria), when Abdul Aziz was the Sultan of the Ottoman Empire and there was a policy of religious liberty.

Their initial sea voyage took House and his wife to the United Kingdom where they had the opportunity to hear the famous "Prince of Preachers," Charles Spurgeon, in London.

Their first child was born in 1873 while they were in Eski Zagra. By 1875 they were transferred by their mission organization to Samokov where their other six children were born. Their work in Samokov involved teaching at a small, established mission school and building a church, where House preached. At House's urging, the school eventually expanded to include an industrial department.

House was both head of the school and the youngest man in the mission. The school grew from 15 to 20 students living in a hired house to 75 students, a modest campus, two large school buildings, an industrial department, and the church. In America his work was recognized, and in 1886 he was given the degree of Doctor of Divinity by his Alma Mater, when he was just a little over 40 years old.

House who spoke fluent Bulgarian was also sent to Constantinople for one year, from 1891 to 1892, to be the editor of the widely circulated Bulgarian newspaper Zornitsa (Morning Star), which was then the oldest newspaper published in Turkey.

Following a furlough to America, House was reassigned to work in Thessaloniki, Ottoman Empire, around 1895.

In 1903, House was targeted for kidnapping by a group of Bulgarian revolutionaries who seized Miss Ellen M. Stone and Mrs. Katerina Tsilka instead. Despite this, House was one of the intermediaries chosen to negotiate their eventual release.

Along with their associates Edward B. Haskell and Theodore Holway, the Houses co-founded the American Farm School in 1902, on 50 acres of barren land near Thessaloniki. The school provided practical training in field and garden crops, vineyards and orchards, livestock and silkworm production, and in industrial skills such as carpentry, masonry and blacksmithing, to equip graduates to succeed in farming and to aid in the economic development of rural Ottoman Empire. The first students were Bulgarian orphans who has lost their parents in the Ilinden-Preobrazhenie Uprising and until the annexation of Thessaloniki by Greece in 1912 the language of education was Bulgarian. In 1906, at age 61, House and his wife moved into their first home at the new school, located within James Hall, where they were joined by their daughter Ruth. A bronze bust of House still stands in front of James Hall.

In House's 64 years as a missionary in the Balkans, he saw and survived the Russo-Turkish war, the Greco-Turkish War, the two Balkan Wars, the collapse of the Ottoman Empire in Europe and World War I.

His 90th birthday celebration at the school was attended by people of many nationalities including ministers and representatives of several governments. The Greek government awarded him the Gold Cross of the Order of Phoenix.

House died April 19, 1936, in Thessaloniki and was buried on the grounds of the Farm School. The marker slab over his grave reads, "An adoring servant of God, a faithful apostle of Christ, a practical friend of man." His wife survived him by 12 years, dying on September 22, 1947, in Orient, New York, where she is buried. There is also a marker slab for her in the Farm School graveyard next to her husband. Their youngest son, Charles Lucius House, who was appointed Assistant Director of the Farm School in 1917 and had become Director after House's retirement in 1929, carried on with his father's work.

== Sources ==
- Marder, Brenda L. (2004). Stewards of the Land. Macon, Georgia: Mercer University Press. ISBN 0-86554-844-7.
- Nankivell, Joice M. (1939). A Life for the Balkans. New York: Fleming H. Revell Company.
- Nankivell, Joice M. (2011). Μια ζωή για τα Βαλκάνια (Greek ed.). Thessaloniki: Κυριακίδη Αφοί. ISBN 978-9604672981.
- Lansdale, Bruce M. (1979). Metamorphosis or, Why I Love Greece. New Rochelle, New York: Caratzas Brothers, Publishers. ISBN 0-89241-083-3.
- Draper, Charlotte Whitney (1994). The American Farm School of Thessaloniki, A Family Album. New York & Thessaloniki: The American Farm School. ISBN 0-9640411-0-3.
- "Dr. John H. House, Educator, Is Dead. Founder of American Farm School in Saloniki, 90, Was Honored by Greece". The New York Times. New York. April 19, 1936.
