= Zavalani =

Zavalani is a surname. Notable people with the surname include:

- Fehim Zavalani, Albanian landowner
- Menduh Zavalani, Albanian revolutionary
- Tajar Zavalani, Albanian historian, publicist, and writer
