= Grigor Cilka =

Albanian Protestant minister who was involved in the Albanian National Awakening

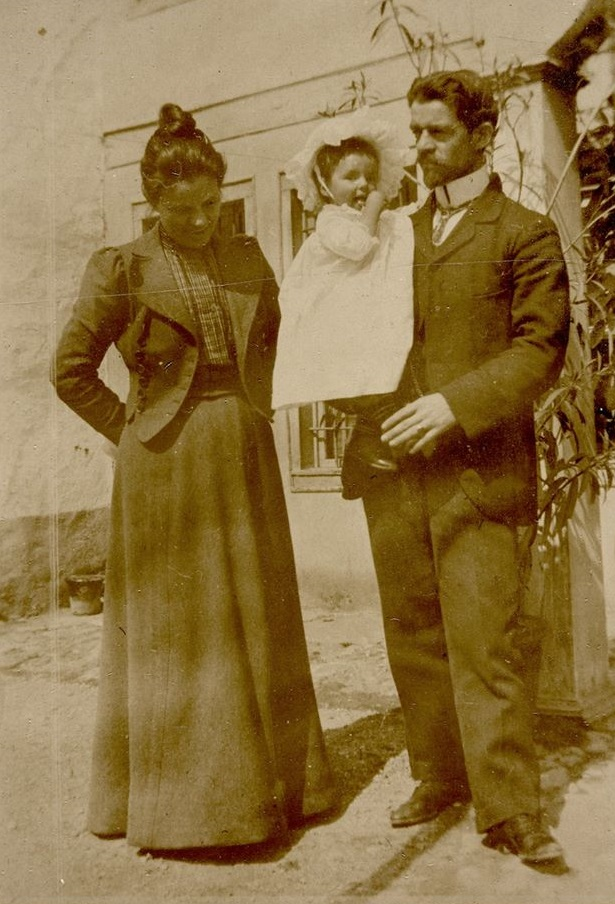
- Grigor Cilka with wife Katerina Cilka and daughter Eleni
- Born: 1875; Vithkuq, Ottoman Empire (present-day Albania)
- Died: 1919; Sofia, Bulgaria
- Occupation(s): reverend, missionary, teacher
- Movement: Albanian National Awakening

Grigor M. Cilka (1875-1919) was an Albanian Protestant reverend and missionary. In the height of the Albanian National Awakening he became a teacher at the first Albanian school for girls in Korçë. His wife Katerina was kidnapped during the Miss Stone Affair.

== Early life and education ==
Grigor Cilka was born in 1875 in Vithkuq. The family later moved to Monastir. He was educated at missionary schools in Monastir, and later Samokov. Cilka was a convert from Orthodox Christianity to Protestant Christianity. He went to New York City, United States to finish his education at the Union Theological Seminary.

== Career ==
During his stay in the US, Cilka in 1899 married Katerina Cilka, a Bulgarian nurse and Protestant from Bansko. In the summer following their marriage, they returned to Bulgaria, settled in Korçë and dedicated their efforts toward missionary work, teaching and humanitarian activities in surrounding villages. Cilka founded a Protestant parish in Korçë. After studying theology, Cilka became a member of Korçë-based organizations that sought the creation of an Albanian state independent of the Ottoman Empire. In the late nineteenth century debate over choosing an Albanian alphabet, Cilka was a supporter of the Frashëri alphabet. Together with his wife Katerina, Cilka served as teacher at the first Albanian school for girls in Korçë.

== Miss Stone Affair ==
In 1901, Katerina, 6 months pregnant, embarked on a regional tour at the invitation of her friend Ellen Maria Stone, an American Protestant missionary. Both were kidnapped by Internal Macedonian Revolutionary Organization (IMRO) members who ransomed them for money in what become known internationally as the Miss Stone Affair. Ottoman authorities suspected Protestants of involvement and for a short time, Cilka was arrested on orders by the vali (governor) of Salonika on unfounded charges of being complicit in the kidnapping. After Katerina's release, the Cilkas returned to Korçë and authorities from the Ottoman state continued to suspect the couple of involvement in the event. The couple had a daughter named Eleni.

== Later life ==
During the IMRO Ilinden Uprising against the Ottoman Empire (1903), to prevent additional persecution by the Ottomans, the Austro-Hungarian consul assisted the couple to temporarily flee the region. In 1908, Cilka was a delegate to the Congress of Manastir, an academic conference with the goal of standardizing the Albanian alphabet. He was active in contemporary public discussions over culture and education in Ottoman territories with Albanian populations, and supported in various newspapers the usage of Latin script to write Albanian. To boost education and intellectual thought among Albanian people, Cilka promoted various literary works known around the world. Cilka served as director of the girls' school, later he was imprisoned by Ottoman authorities and the educational institution closed shortly thereafter in February 1904. In 1906, an Albanian guerilla band assassinated Greek bishop Photios and Ottoman authorities unable to arrest the perpetrators, had Cilka and other Korçë Albanian notables involved in the national movement imprisoned, but released soon after. Cilka in 1906 was involved in the establishment of groups geared toward nationalist aims. After the declaration of independence, Cilka moved to Bulgaria where he died in 1919 from the Spanish flu.

== See also ==
- Mësonjëtorja
- Albanian Alphabet
- Education in Albania
