= Leonidha Naçi =

Albanian teacher and patriot (1875–1940)

Leonidha Naçi (1875-1940) was an Albanian teacher and patriot. He served at the first Albanian school in Vlorë and was a delegate to the Congress of Manastir that standardized the Albanian alphabet.

== Life ==
Naçi was born to an Eastern Orthodox family in Korçë, then part of the Ottoman Empire, in 1875. He was the brother of Nuçi Naçi, director of the Mësonjëtorja school in his hometown. Naçi studied in Bucharest and later in Athens. He lived in Corfu for some time, before returning to Albania. In 1908, Naçi was sent as a delegate of Vlorë to the Congress of Manastir, where issues concerning the Albanian language were discussed and the Albanian alphabet was standardized. He was an important member of the patriotic club Labëria, and served at the first Albanian school in Vlorë. He represented Albania in the three Balkan Conferences (1930-1934). A street in Vlore was named in his honor after his death.

== See also ==
- Education in Albania
