= Ellen M. Stone =

American missionary (1847–1927)

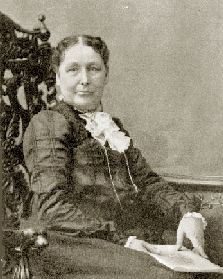
- Born: Ellen Maria Stone; July 24, 1846; Roxbury, Boston, Massachusetts, U.S.
- Died: December 14, 1927 (aged 81); Chelsea, Massachusetts, U.S.
- Occupations: missionary; teacher; author
- Known for: Miss Stone Affair

Ellen M. Stone (1846–1927) was an American Protestant missionary, teacher, and author. She was stationed in Bulgaria and Macedonia, then part of the Ottoman Empire. Kidnapped in the course of her work, the incident was described as "America's First Modern Hostage Crisis". The circumstances in connection with her capture by brigands, September 3, 1901, on a mountain road in Macedonia, and her subsequent detention by them for nearly six months, pending the payment of her ransom, were given wide newspaper publicity. Her narration of these events was published in McClure's, May–October, 1902.

== Early life and education ==
Ellen Maria Stone was born in Roxbury, Boston, Massachusetts, July 24, 1846. Her parents were Benjamin F. and Lucy (Waterman) Stone. Stone was of New England ancestry on both sides.

On her father's side, Ellen descended from Gregory Stone, who, with his wife Lydia, came from Suffolk, England, about 1636, and settled in Cambridge, Massachusetts. His brother Simon had preceded him to the U.S., settling in Watertown, Massachusetts. Gregory Stone was a member of the Colonial Legion, and his name appears in volume one of the Provincial Records.

Stone's great-grandfather on the paternal side, Eliphalet Stone, of Marlborough, New Hampshire. He served in the Revolutionary War. His son Shubael, Ellen's grandfather, enlisted in the same regiment toward the close of the war. The latter also served in the War of 1812, as captain of a company which he recruited. The wife of Shubael Stone was Polly Rogers, of an old New England family. Miss Stone also descended, through her maternal grandmother, Lucy Waterman Barker, from the Pilgrim, Captain Myles Standish.

Benjamin Franklin Stone, father of Miss Stone, was connected with the militia of New Hampshire and Massachusetts, being a member of the Norfolk Guard, afterward known as the Roxbury City Guard, during his residence in that town.

Upon the outbreak of the Civil War, Ellen's two eldest brothers enlisted, and served three years each, the eldest, George Franklin, in the Army of the Potomac, and the second, Edwin Cornelius, in the navy. The father enlisted in Company K, Forty-third Massachusetts Infantry, and saw service at Newbern and Little Washington, North Carolina. The father and his two sons returned home upon the end of their term of service, uninjured.

Stone was educated in the elementary branches at Shurtleff Grammar School, in Roxbury schools, and after 1860, in the grammar and high schools of Chelsea, Massachusetts. As a school-girl, Stone was a leader.

== Career ==
After graduating from the Chelsea high school, Stone taught school for a while in Chelsea (1866–67). From 1867 to 1878, she was an associated editor of the Congregationalist, in charge of the church news, children's department, poetry, and the missionary department.

Deeply imbued with religious feeling, she became interested in foreign missions. Her special "call" came through a sermon preached by Dr. Alden. Some years of work in the Christian church and Sunday-school followed, Stone's home church being the First Congregational.

She was appointed in 1878, by the American Board of Commissioners for Foreign Missions, as a member of their European Turkey Mission, to Samokov, Bulgaria. There, she began working in the Samakov Girls Boarding School, as assistant to Esther T. Maltbie, teaching English branches, while learning the new language.

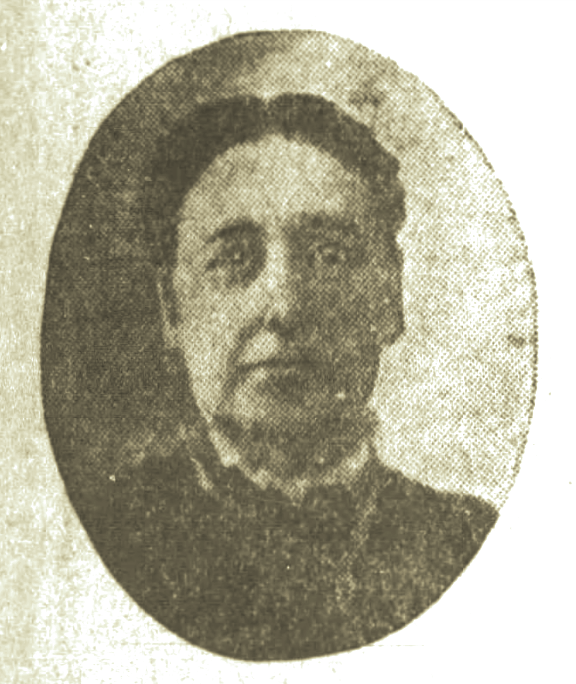
Ellen M. Stone

After becoming familiar with the language, her field of usefulness widened, as the Board then appointed her superintendent of the "Bible women", who taught in the towns and villages of the country, that younger children (than the pupils at the boarding-school) and their mothers should be reached. These were Bulgarian women who were in many cases graduates from the school.

As these workers were appointed by and were under the instruction and guidance of Stone, she visited them at regular intervals. These visits required many hours of overland travel. When Stone entered into this larger work, her home was at Philippopolis.

After 20 years in Bulgaria, Stone was transferred in 1898 to Salonica, then part of the Ottoman Empire, now in Greece. Here, associated with Dr. House and Mr. Baird, Mr. Haskell and their families, Stone carried on a work in that city, which included many conversions among the sailors from the British fleet, anchored for a time in Salonica Harbor. Stone had endured the heat of a Salonican summer, with the exception of one trip to Samokov. Stone went to Bansko for a three weeks' training school with her Bible women.

=== Kidnapping ===
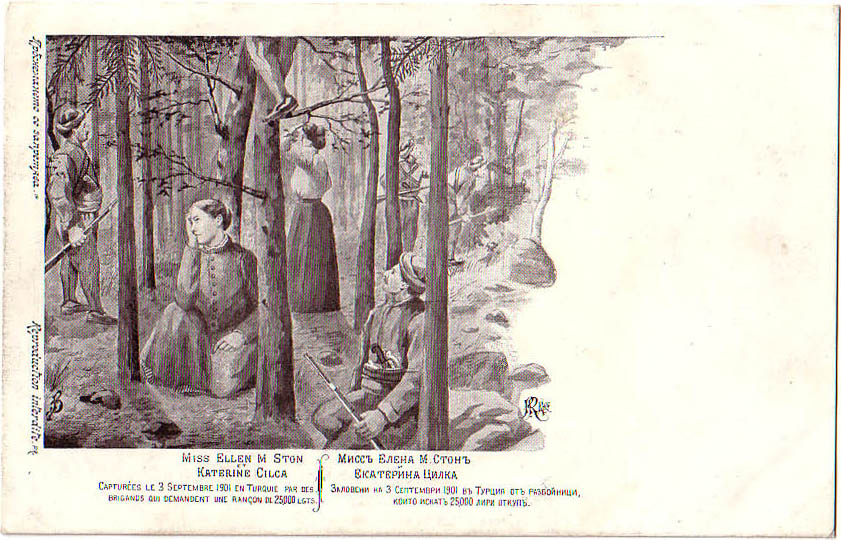
1902 postcard showing Stone and fellow missionary, Katerina Cilka, being held by kidnappers.

On September 3, 1901, while returning from a teachers' convention at Samokov, Bulgaria, a small party was waylaid on a mountain road near Gradevo, between Bansko and Gorna Djumaya, then in the Ottoman Empire, now in Bulgaria. One member was shot and Stone and Katerina Cilka, wife of an Albanian missionary, taken captive. Through the American legation at Constantinople, notice was served that unless US$110,000 was forthcoming, both women would be killed.

During her captivity, Stone suffered no personal violence. She was confined at one time to a cave, closely guarded, and treated with deference, if not with liberality.

The Board of Foreign Missions appealed for aid and US$72,500 was obtained and paid over only after the brigands had consented to a month's grace in order to allow additional subscriptions. It was not, however, until five months after their capture that the two were released. Their captors, fearing Ottoman soldiers, moved Stone and Tsilka from place to place until, through arrangements with John G. A. Leishman, American Minister at the Sublime Porte, a spot not far from Salonika was agreed upon where the money was paid and the victims were freed on February 23, 1902. Most of the ransom money was raised by public subscription in the U.S.

== Return to the U.S. ==
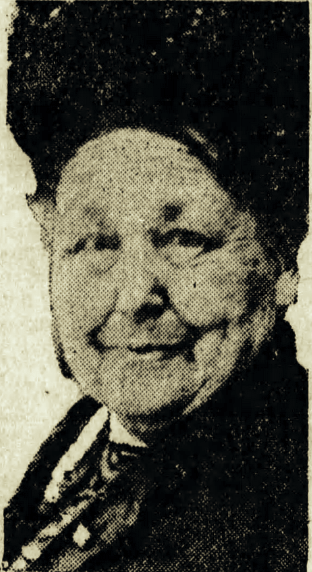
(1927)

After her return to the U.S. in April 1902, she lived quietly in Chelsea, Massachusetts. Some part of her time was given to lecturing on missionary subjects, including her own personal experience in the missionary field. She also gave much time endeavoring to secure from the government the reimbursement of those people who gave her ransom, encouraged by it to expect such reimbursement. The measure recommended by the State Department was passed in the Senate of the 60th Congress and also of the 61st and was unanimously recommended by the House of Representatives' Committee on Claims in the 61st and 62d Congresses.

Stone was a contributor to McClure's Magazine, May–October, 1902; she wrote The Story of Our Captivity, or Six Months Among Brigands. Her manuscript and illustrations of a book American Mission Work in the Balkans, concluding with the story of the captivity, were destroyed in the Great Chelsea fire of 1908, on April 12, 1908, with all her belongings. She was a contributor to missionary publications.

She was a member of the American Board of Missions, Woman's Board of Missions, Religious Education Association, and the International Missionary Union. Stone was also a member of the Woman's Christian Temperance Union (W.C.T.U.), serving as national lecturer in the Department of Co-operation with Missions).

== Personal life ==
In religion, Stone was a Congregationalist. She favored woman suffrage.

In later life, she lived with a niece. Ellen Maria Stone died in Chelsea, Massachusetts, December 14, 1927.

== Selected works ==
- Stone, Ellen M. (May 1902). "Six Months Among Brigands" (PDF). McClure's Magazine. 19. New York & London: S. S. McClure Company.; via HathiTrust
