= Jovan Kosturi =

Albanian activist

Jovan Cico Kosturi (1831–1924) was involved in the Albanian National Awakening.

Founded in early 1880s, the magazine Drita by 1884 was led by Kosturi along with Orhan Pojani and Thimi Marko while it was distributed throughout Toskëria (southern Albania) and it advocated for Albanian language education in the Tosk dialect. During 1885, Kosturi set up a secret committee in Korçë to prepare an Albanian cultural society in the interior of the country. In 1906, Greek bishop Photios was assassinated by an Albanian guerilla band and as Ottoman authorities could not arrest the assassins, Kosturi and other Albanian notables involved in the national movement from Korçë were imprisoned. After some months the Greeks retaliated by assassinating Kosturi's son Spiro Kosturi in Salonica. Kosturi was also the father of Idhomene Kosturi, an Albanian politician, regent and once acting Prime Minister of Albania.
