= Assassination of Binbashi Halil Musa Bey =

1908 murder in Gjirokastër, Albania

Assassination of Binbashi Halil Musa Bey of Gjirokastër
- Date: 25 February 1908; 118 years ago
- Location: on the main street of Gjirokastër,South Albania
- Outcome: 5 rebels pursued to and surrounded in Mashkullorë.
- Deaths: Halil Musa Bey and several of his guards
- Convicted: Çerçiz Topulli,Mihal Grameno,Bajo Topulli,Hito Lekdushi,Bajram Ligu and many others (In absentia)
- Charges: High treason

The Assassination of Binbashi Halil Musa Bey of 1908 also known as the Assassination of the Binbash of Gjirokastër was an incident that occurred on 25 February 1908 in the town of Gjirokastër in Southern Albania when a group of two Albanian rebels that were a part of an armed Çetë led by Çerçiz Topulli fired upon the Binbash of Gjirokastra and his guards as a part of an organized operation. The incident resulted in the death of the Ottoman governor and his guards.

== Background ==
During the years of 1906–1907, an Albanian Çetë led by Çerçiz Topulli, Mihal Grameno and Bajo Topulli would organize many guerrilla attacks in Southern Albania to oppose Ottoman rule in the area. By 1908 the fighting escalated, culminating in a "larger-scale" armed revolt.

The Binbashi of Gjirokastër, Halil Musa Bey, an Ottoman Lieutenant Colonel of Bosniak origin, was responsible for suppressing the local Albanian civil population, leading to him being one of the "primary targets" of the armed Albanian guerrillas which had attempted to assassinate him two times, however neither attempt was successful.

== Assassination ==
On 25 February 1908, Halil Musa Bey, the binbashi of Gjirokastër, together with his guards were walking through the main street of Gjirokastër when at 11:15 they were stopped by 2 members of Çerçiz Topulli's Çetë, Hito Lekdushi and Bajram Ligu who had disguised themselves to blend into the crowd of Albanians in the town. The two rebels fired upon the governor, shooting him in the chest and head as well as killing some of the guards around him, leaving only one of the guards alive who was of Albanian ethnicity, only injuring him after shooting him in the hand.

After the assassination the Albanian rebels began their escape from Gjirokastër however they were pursued by a large group of Ottoman guards which were fired upon by other rebels hidden in the roofs and alleyways of the town, forcing them to stop.

== Aftermath ==
After the incident, 5 rebels that fled from Gjirokastër sought out refuge in the tower of Mashkullorë, which on 5 or 18 March 1908 was surrounded by an army consisting of 150-200 Ottoman soldiers. Despite being outnumbered, the Albanian rebels would resist the Ottoman attack.

== Sources ==
- Skendi, Stavro (1967). The Albanian national awakening. Princeton: Princeton University Press. ISBN 9781400847761.
