= Tajar Zavalani =

Albanian historian, publicist, and writer (1903–1966)

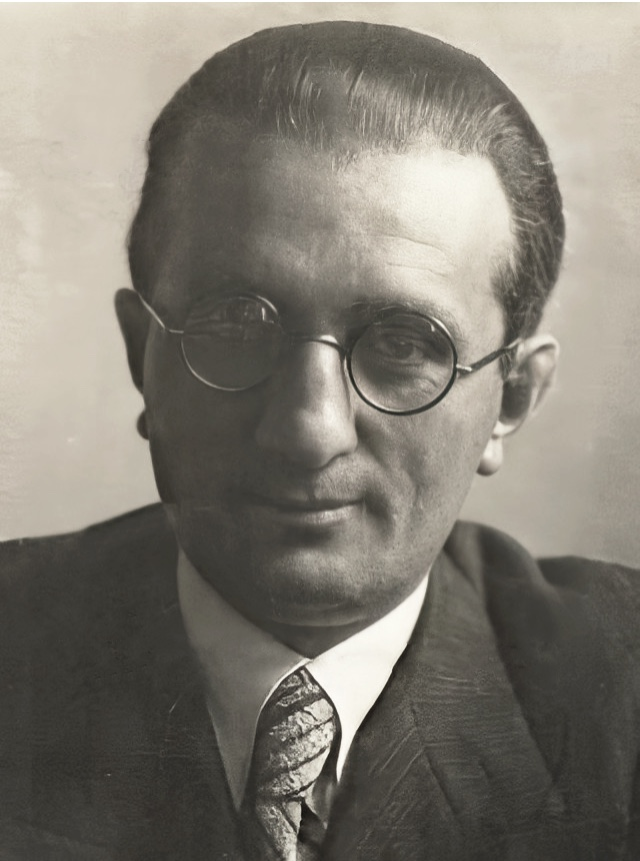
- Born: 15 August 1903; Monastir, Ottoman Empire (modern North Macedonia)
- Died: 19 August 1966 (aged 63); England
- Citizenship: Ottoman, Albanian, British
- Education: Leningrad Communist University; Russian State Agricultural University
- Occupations: Journalist, translator
- Spouse: Maria Selma Zavalani (Frashëri)
- Relatives: Fehim Zavalani (father); Qerime Frashëri (mother); Adile Zavalani (sister); Asim, Hysen, Dalip Zavalani (brothers)
- Writing career
- Pen name: T.Z., ZAKS, TANI, TARZANI, TA
- Language: English, Albanian
- Notable work: How Strong Is Russia (1951)

Tajar Zavalani known later in his life as Thomas-Henry Zavalani (August 15, 1903 – August 19, 1966) was an Albanian historian, publicist, and writer.

== Life ==
Zavalani was born on 15 August 1903 in Monastir, Ottoman Empire, today's Bitola in North Macedonia, or Korça, today's Albania. He was the son of Albanian activist and nationalist Fehim Zavalani and Qerime Frashëri from Korçë. His father had settled in Monastir, very active within the Albanian patriotic circles of Monastir Vilayet, close cooperator of the Qiriazi family, and participant in the Congress of Monastir (1908) and Congress of Dibra (1909). The Congress of Monastir was held in a hotel owned by him.

Tajar Zavalani took his first studies in the Marist Brothers French Catholic school, and after the bombardment of Monastir during World War I he left for Salonica, where he enlisted in the French lyceum. He studied literature there.

Zavalani came in Tirana in 1922. He started working for the Ministry of Foreign Affairs, initially as a secretary of the Commission for the Border Delimitation headed by Ali Pasha Kolonja. The commission was part of task-force commissions throughout post-World War I Europe for delimiting disputable border segments, as decided by Paris Peace Conference of 1919.

In June 1924, he took part in the uprising of Vlora as a member of the "Bashkimi" (Unity) Organization of the recently assassinated Avni Rustemi. These events led to Fan Noli and his supporters coming to power. After the return of Ahmet Zogu in power by December 1924, Zavalani fled to Italy. The Soviet Union offered to let him study in Russia as a "victim of counterrevolution". After a year in Moscow, despite his hobby of electrotechnics, he attended the Marxist–Leninist school in Leningrad. In the summer of 1929, he returned to Moscow and worked at the Agrarian Institute, specialising in economics. In November 1930, he managed to get out of Soviet Union with his perception of the Soviet Union being altered by the collectivisation campaign. He settled in Berlin, and soon-after in Leysin, near Montreux in Switzerland. There he was treated for tuberculosis.

In January 1933, Zavalani returned to Albania, where he was active in the translation of literary works, mostly from Russian and French literature, and as a publicist. Among other translations was The mother, a novel of Gorky which was banned by the authorities. In 1935 he was Director of State Lyceum in Tirana, later director of "Malet T'ona" College, and chaired Tirana branch of the Vllaznija Literary Society. Meanwhile, his brother Hysen, who had also settled in the Soviet Union, would be executed by the Soviets due to involvement in some turmoils in Saratov (1938). From a bearer of the Communist ideas, he abandoned the Communist movement, and actually became an anti-communist.

In 1936, he married Selma Vrioni (1915–1995), also known as Maria Selma, daughter of Kahreman Vrioni (1889–1955), a rich bey from Fier area, and Emine Frashëri (daughter of Abdyl Frashëri).

After the Italian invasion of 1939, he was interned in northern Italy, from where he escaped with his wife, who was a former lady-in-waiting to former Queen Geraldine, reaching former King Zog's party and settling to England in 1940. In November 1940, he was given a job in the BBC's Albanian-language service. With his friend Costa Chekrezi, and his BBC colleagues Dervish Duma and Anton Logoreci, he appealed to the British authorities and to King Zog for monetary support for establishing a "Free Albanian" committee which would serve like a government in exile. Although the idea was supported by the British albanophiles, it did not make it to light due to Zogu's rejection. Ahmet Zogu replied that "his position as the Head of State of Albania and could not be affected by the attitude of few lads in London".

Zavalani worked for BBC for the rest of his life. He was a member of PEN Club and published in its press organ Arena, and Chairman of ACEN branch of London. Zavalani died in an accident in 1966. His wife engaged as a representative of the "Free Albania" National Committee after his death.

== Publications ==
Zavalani published:

- How Strong Is Russia, London: Hollis and Carter, 1951.
- Histori e Shqipnis (History of Albania), London, volume I in 1957, volume II in 1963.
- Land of Eagles: A History of Albania from Illyrian Times to the Present Day, the English-language version of "History of Albania", remains unpublished.

Zavalani supported the theory of a non-forced islamisation of Albanians during the Ottoman times.

== See also ==
- Communism in Albania
- Ernest Koliqi
- Midhat Frashëri
