= Idhomen Kosturi =

Albanian politician (1873–1943)

Idhomen Jovan Kosturi
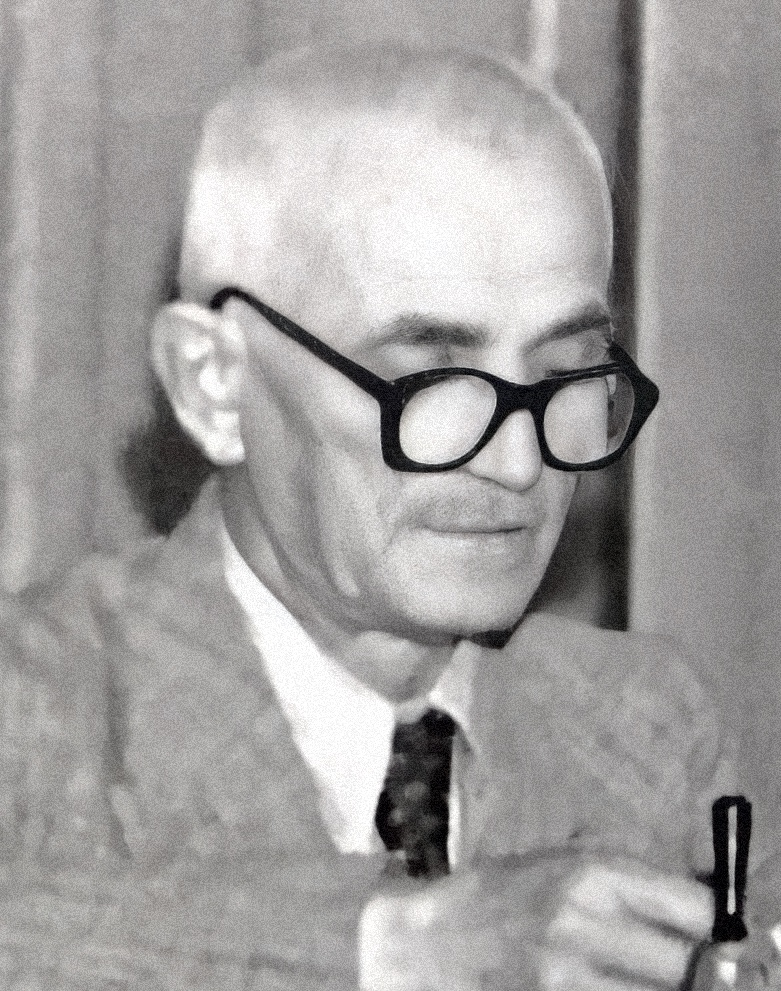

Prime Minister of Albania (acting)
- In office 12 December 1921 – 24 December 1921
- Monarch: Wilhelm I
- Preceded by: Hasan Prishtina
- Succeeded by: Omer Vrioni

Personal details
- Born: 15 May 1873 Korçë, Ottoman Empire
- Died: 5 November 1943 (aged 70) Durrës, Albania
- Cause of death: Assassinated
- Relations: Jovan Kosturi (father); Spiro Kosturi (brother)
- Occupation: Merchant, politician

Idhomen Jovan Kosturi (15 May 1873 – 5 November 1943), also known as Idhomeno Kosturi, was an Albanian politician, regent and once acting Prime Minister of Albania. He would become the second representative of Albanian Orthodox population to become head of the Albanian government, after Pandeli Evangjeli. Kosturi was also among the contributors to the first Albanian teachers' school, the Shkolla Normale e Elbasanit, a teacher training institution that was founded on 1 December 1909 in Elbasan.

== Life ==
Kosturi, son of Albanian patriot and activist Jovan Cico Kosturi was born in Korçë in south-eastern Albania, back then Ottoman Empire, on 15 May 1873.
Kosturi studied US and German history in Boston, MA, where he resided for several years. He became an American citizen. After his return home, being a polyglot and intellectual and having a patriotic family background, Kosturi joined the Albanian irredentist circles in the Manastir Vilayet. He was vice-chairman of the Secret Committee for the Liberation of Albania based in Bitola. He was a member and bookkeeper of the "Dituria" (Knowledge) society founded in Korçë, and led by Orhan Pojani. After a visit (1902) to Bucharest, Kosturi told Albanians in Korçë that the main concern of Dituria was to improve the Albanian boys school in the town through student attainment of higher grades, selecting better teachers and introducing new subjects. In 1909, he participated as representative of "Dituria" in the Congress of Elbasan, where it was decided the opening of Shkolla Normale e Elbasanit. In 1912, his name appears again as a member of the short-lived society "Shoqëria shkollore" (Scholastic society). He was a strong supporter of the Albanian Orthodox Church autocephaly, and the first Albanian church opened in Durrës in 1913. During the First World War he resided in Albania where he led his own cheta (guerrilla fighters) from 1914 to 1918.

He continued the political involvement in the new Albanian state. In 1919, Kosturi was a delegate in the Congress of Durrës, following with hist participation in the Congress of Lushnje (1920). In 1920, he was elected Minister of Posts and Telegraphs. During the institutional crisis of 1921 in Albania, he served shortly as Prime Minister of Albania, replacing the short-lived government of Hasan Prishtina. Meanwhile, Kosturi had built reputation and financial stability as a successful merchant.
In 1922, he signed the order for expulsion of Greek Bishop Iakovos (an opponent of Albanian Orthodox Autocephaly) from Korçë. He was a supporter of Fan Noli during the June Revolution of 1924. Kosturi was Deputy Prime Minister in Noli's government of 1924. After the suppression of June Revolution and rise in power of Ahmet Zogu, he went in exile and joined Noli's KONARE (Revolutionary National Committee).

Kosturi returned into Albanian political life on 1 October 1943, as a representative of Korçë region, and the same year was elected to lead the Commission for Mandate Verification, later Chairman of Constitutional Assembly of Albania on 25 October 1943. As a chairman, he declared as "void" all laws and legal act approved during 7 April 1939 and September 1943. Thus the "Personal unification" between Albania and Italy (established on 12 April 1939) came to an end. He declared the official Albanian neutrality in World War II.

He was shot on 5 November 1943 in Durrës, right after leaving his home. The responsible party was the local Communist Guerrilla Unit. The action was carried out by a young communist, Kolë Laku. It is still unknown why Kosturi was pinpointed by the communists.
When the future Albanian Prime Minister Rexhep Mitrovica was voted in the Parliament, he proposed the Assembly to declare National day of mourning. Kolë Laku became well known when he was arrested on 24 February 1944, and would be hanged.

For his merits in Albanian political life and his state-forming and organizational contributions to Albania, Mihal Zallari (member of the Regency) directed that the square in front of the former Assembly of Albania building (area includes today's "Puppets' Theater", part of the Skanderbeg Square, and Socialist Party of Albania's premises) be renamed from "Costanzo Ciano" to "Idhomene Kosturi".

With the rise of Communism in Albania, his patriotic, political, and financial contribution would get annihilated. He would be referred as "traitor" or even "Gestapo agent".

== See also ==
- History of Albania

Political offices
Preceded by Hasan Prishtina	Prime Minister of Albania (acting); 12 December 1921 – 24 December 1921	Succeeded by Xhafer Bej Ypi
