= Mësonjëtorja =

Mësonjëtorja e Parë Shqipe
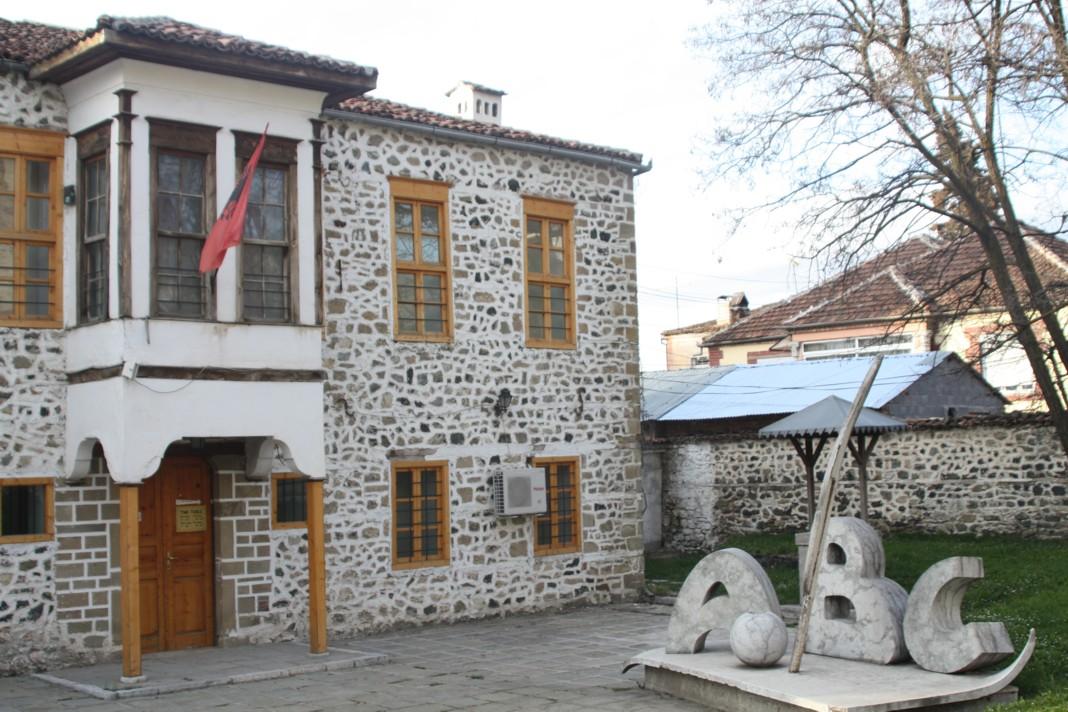
- Courtyard of the Mësonjëtorja museum, Korçë

Location
- Shën Gjergji Boulevard, Korçë; Albania
- Coordinates: 40°37′00″N 20°46′48″E

Information
- Other name: Shkolla
- Established: 7 March 1887; 139 years ago
- Closed: 1967

Mësonjëtorja or the Albanian School was the first secular school in the Albanian language in Ottoman Albania. It was opened in Korçë during the late Ottoman period. The school building serves as a museum and is located on the north side of Bulevardi Shën Gjergji (St. George Boulevard).

The opening of the school was a result of the Albanian National Movement which aimed to create an independent Albania and to secure denied rights to Albanian people within the Ottoman Empire. Among others Mësonjëtorja was an important center of cultural and patriotic education. The school's importance was raised because until then giving lessons in the Albanian language was done in private and secret due to Ottoman rule. The school opened its doors on 7 March 1887 and since then the day is celebrated by Albanians as the "Day of Teachers".

== History ==
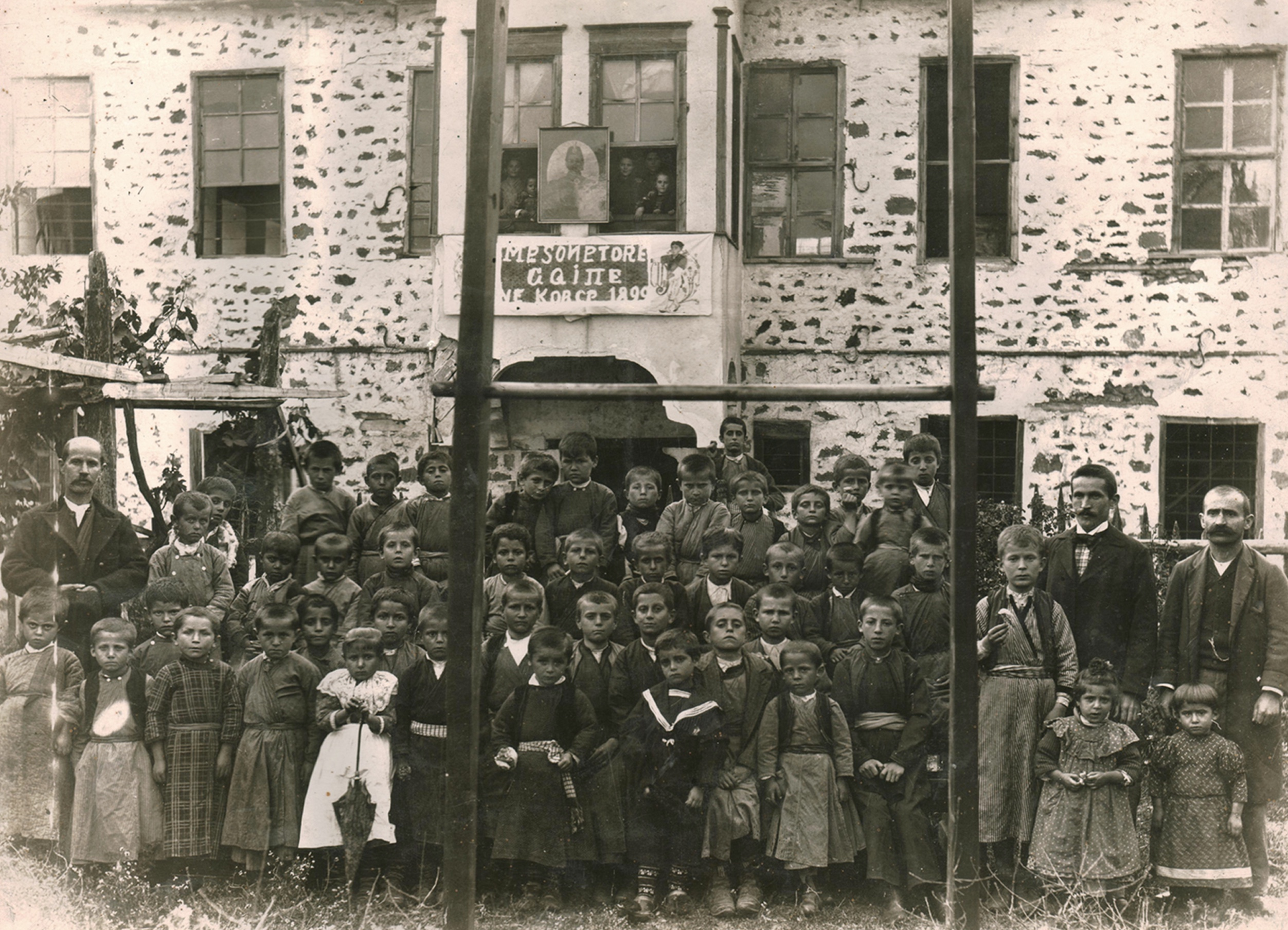
Pupils of the "Mësonjëtorja" in 1899

In 1885, Naim Frashëri, a government civil servant in the education ministry, Sami Frashëri and along with other influential Albanians involved in the Society for the Publication of Albanian Writings managed to get permission from the sultan for the opening of a private Albanian boys elementary school in Korçë. Financial support for the school came from a diaspora organisation Drita (English: the Light), an Albanian society based in Bucharest, while Albanians from Istanbul got Pandeli Sotiri to become its first school director. Both the Society for Albanian Writings and Drita had agreed in past times not to antagonize town notables who were under Greek cultural influence by founding Albanian schools. As such Drita sent one of its members Thimi Marko, a town native on a mission to discuss the matter and he met with the Orthodox Metropolitan and his council (demogerontia) in Korçë. The Constantinople Patriarchate refused have Albanian taught within existing Greek schools belonging to the Korçë Orthodox community. Pandeli Sotiri was sent to Korçë and opened the school on 7 March 1887. Due to a lack of education material Sami, his brother Naim Frashëri and several other Albanians wrote textbooks in the Albanian language for the school. During 1887, Pandeli Sotiri had to leave Korçë and administration of the school passed to Petro Nini Luarasi, a revolutionary and Thanas Sina. The Ottoman authorities gave permission only for Christian children to be educated in Albanian, but the Albanians did not follow this restriction and allowed Muslim children to attend. In the first few years, the school overall had some two hundred enrolled students of Muslim and Christian faiths. By 1888, the elementary school had 100 Christian and 60 Muslim students.

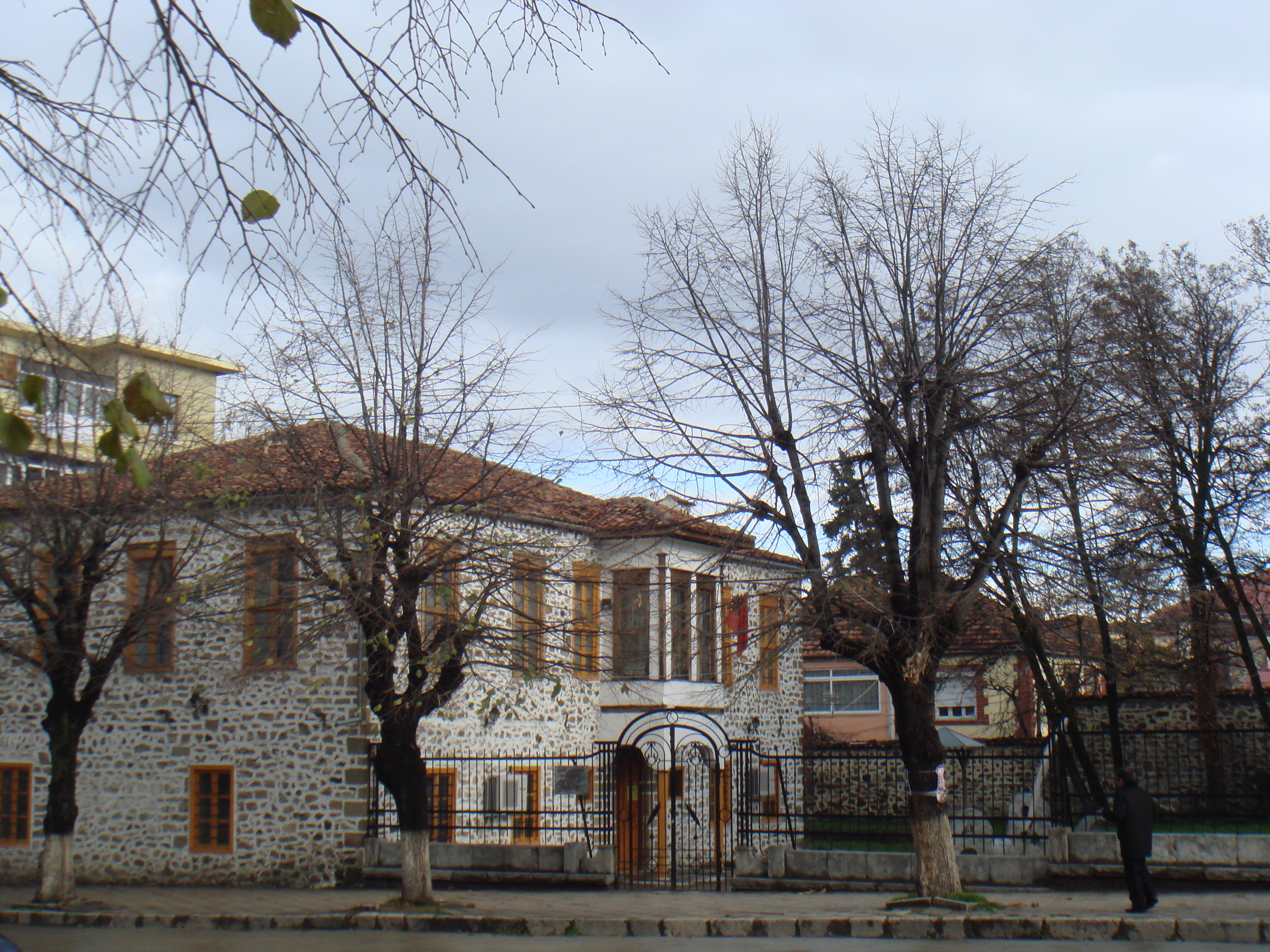
The Mësonjëtorja in Korçë

Local pressure against parents sending their children to the school grew. The Constantinople Patriarchate was opposed the school's establishment and along with mainly Greek clerics both were concerned that the development of a national consciousness among Orthodox Albanians could lead to the creation of an Orthodox Albanian church. As such from its founding the metropolitan and Orthodox notables intensified attacks against the school, while the school was denounced as subversive to Orthodox unity by local Greek priests. The Orthodox church threatened excommunication and forced parents to remove their children from attending the school resulting in a drastic drop of student numbers. During the same time Muslims were discouraged from enrollment and forced by the local Ottoman administration to withdraw attending the school as they feared that an Albanian national renaissance might eventuate in revolutionary activity. Over time due to pressure coming from both sides school enrollment went down to eighty students.

During the school's existence, the organisation Drita (later renamed as Dituria) and the Albanian Society of Istanbul viewed as one of their aims being to support the elementary school in Korçë. Financial difficulties however plagued the school as Albanians could not raise the needed funds to support it. The pro-Patriarchate party in Korçë falsely accused Albanians involved with the school of raising funds for Komita guerilla bands against Ottoman rule. Support came from the people and school managed to survive for fifteen years. Nuçi Naçi, had become the new director of the school and had managed to get support from the Turkish governor general based in Monastir (modern Bitola). A translated version of Sami's play Besa yahut Ahde Vefa (Pledge of Honour or Loyalty to an Oath) in Albanian celebrating an Albanian identity also became part of the school curriculum in 1901. After a visit (1902) to Bucharest, Idhomene Kosturi told Albanians in Korçë that the main concern of Dituria was to improve the boys school through student attainment of higher grades, selecting better teachers and introducing new subjects. The mistrust of Christians by the sultan increased who thought that Albanian education could contribute to the concept of Albanian unity and nationality open to exploitation by foreign interests. Abdul Hamid II ordered the school closed down in 1902. Mehmed Ali Pasha Delvina, the new Ottoman governor of Korçë supported the empire, was against Albanian nationalism and in 1902 Nuçi Naçi was arrested and incarcerated in Salonica. The school had survived until 1902 under the teachers Leonidis and Naum Naça who were arrested and declared as traitors by Ottoman authorities at the request of Greek clergy with the school being closed down, vandalised and wrecked. By 1903 the school's trustees Vani Kosturi, Spiro Kosturi, Thimi Marko and Orhan Pojani were also arrested and imprisoned in Salonica, while Pojani was exiled to Anatolia.

Albanian efforts for an Albanian school are represented in Greek sources as a failure due to weak demand and limited funding, but Michael Palairet notes that Greek interference undermined the school.

== See also ==
- Education in Albania
- Albanian National Awakening
- Albanian nationalism
- Congress of Elbasan
- Congress of Manastir
- Second Congress of Manastir
