= Miss Stone Affair =

International kidnapping incident

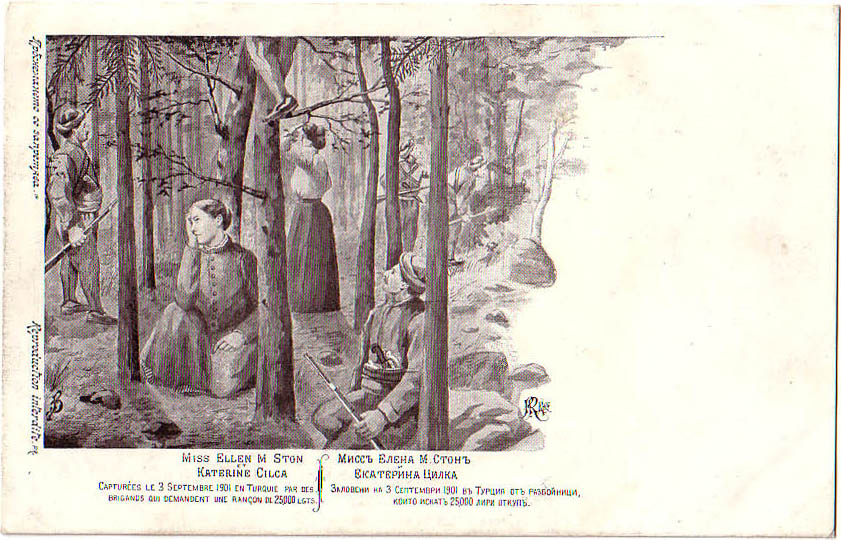
A postcard with the kidnapped Ellen Stone and Katerina Cilka

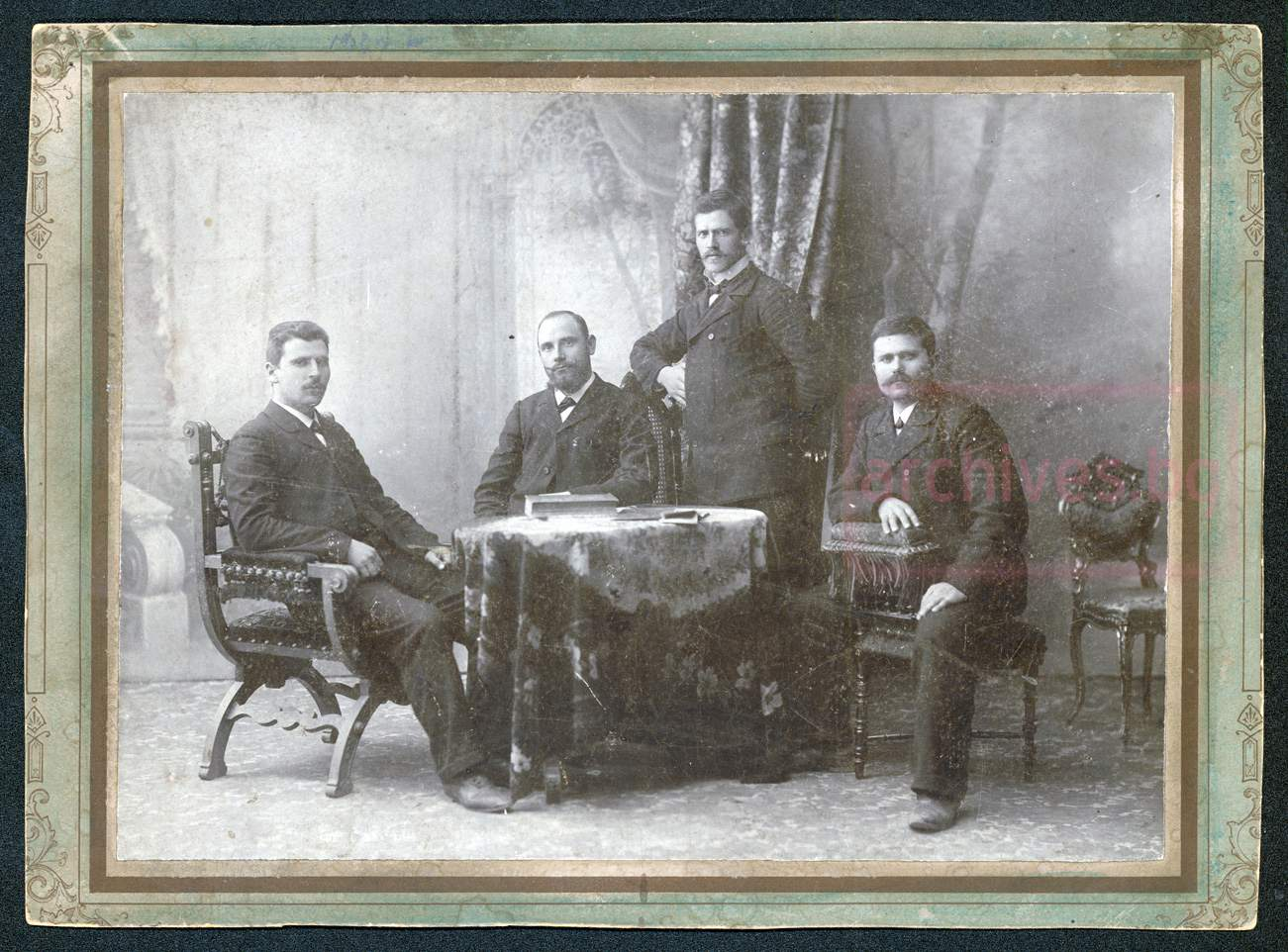
The participants in the Miss Stone Affair - Sava Mihaylov, Yane Sandanski, Krastyo Asenov and Hristo Chernopeev.

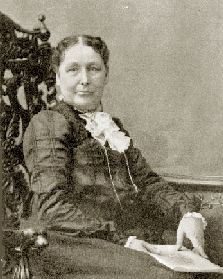
Ellen Maria Stone

The Miss Stone Affair (Bulgarian: Афера „Мис Стоун“, Macedonian: „Афера Мис Стон“) was the kidnapping of American Protestant missionary Ellen Maria Stone and her pregnant Bulgarian fellow missionary and friend Katerina Cilka by the pro-Bulgarian Internal Macedonian Revolutionary Organization.

== History ==
=== Background ===
In 1901, one of the main problems facing the Internal Macedonian Revolutionary Organization was its lack of resources for armaments. This financial crisis was discussed at the meeting of the leadership of IMRO in Kyustendil, Bulgaria, that summer. At the meeting, Gotse Delchev argued that small robberies only tarnished the reputation of the organization and were not helpful to solving the financial problem.

Delchev then authorized Mihail Gerdzhikov to carry out the kidnapping of a wealthy person or persons in Macedonia to obtain funds, but he failed. Delchev made two other unsuccessful attempts with wealthy Turks and Greeks. He later developed a plan to kidnap the son of Ivan Evstratiev Geshov, which also failed. Yane Sandanski then offered to kidnap Ferdinand of Bulgaria during his visit to the Rila Monastery, but the radical plan was opposed by Delchev, who believed that the abduction had to be done on Ottoman territory. Chernopeev and Sandanski discussed the kidnapping of a wealthy Turk near Simitli, but that plan was not realized. Sandanski, Hristo Chernopeev and Sava Mihaylov prepared a plan for the kidnapping of Süleyman Bey, but his illness caused that action to fail as well.

=== Kidnapping ===
Sandanski was then drawn to the idea of kidnapping a Protestant missionary of Bansko. A detachment led by the voivoda Yane Sandanski and the sub-voivodas Hristo Chernopeev and Krastyo Asenov carried this out on August 21, 1901. Two women (Ellen Maria Stone and her fellow missionary Katerina Stefanova-Cilka) were kidnapped near Gradevo, between Bansko and Gorna Dzhumaya, which were Ottoman towns. Miss Stone has been described as having experienced "Stockholm syndrome". Per academic Dmitar Tasić and historian İpek Yosmaoğlu, it was apparently an early case of the alleged condition.

The goal of the kidnapping was to receive a heavy ransom, which would aid the financially-struggling IMRO. The detachment was pursued by the Ottoman and the Bulgarian authorities and by a cheta of a contending organization, the Supreme Macedonian Committee. Ottoman authorities briefly arrested Grigor Cilka, Katerina's husband, on unfounded charges of being complicit in the kidnapping. The affair ended after intensive negotiations in early 1902, half a year after the kidnapping. IMRO was paid a ransom of 14,000 Ottoman gold liras on January 18, 1902, in Bansko, and the hostages were released on February 2 near Strumica.

Widely covered by the media at the time, the event has been often dubbed "America's first modern hostage crisis."

== See also ==
- List of kidnappings (1900–1939)
