= Fehim Zavalani =

Albanian journalist and activist (1859–1935)

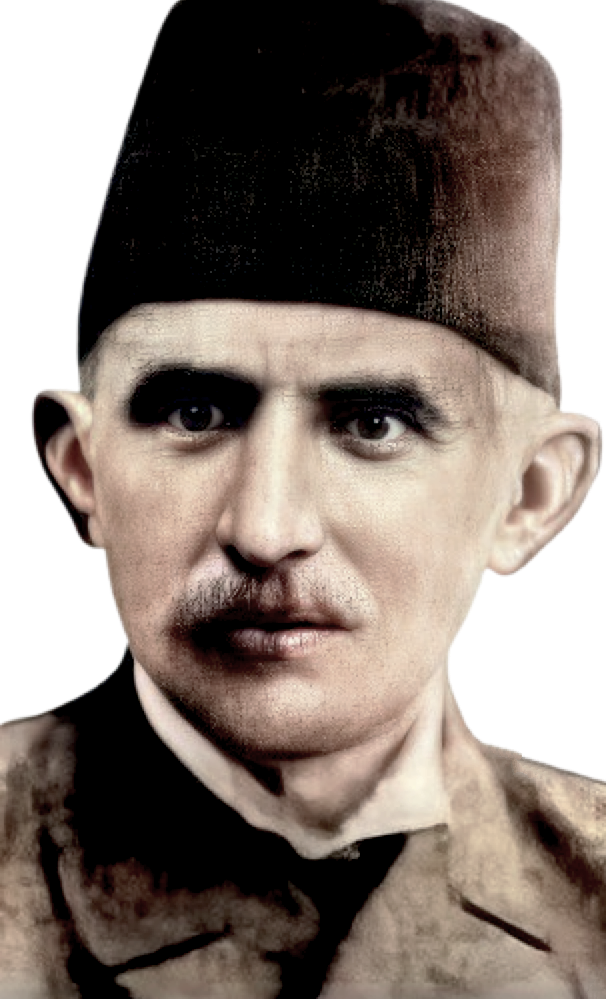
- Born: 1859; Zavalan, Janina Vilayet, Ottoman Empire (modern Albania)
- Died: 1935 (aged 75–76)
- Known for: Secret Committee for the Liberation of Albania, Congress of Monastir, Congress of Dibra
- Spouse: Qerime Frashëri
- Children: Adile (daughter), Asim, Hysen, Dalip, Tajar Zavalani (son)
- Relatives: Sabri, Shefqet Frashëri (brother-in-law)

Fehim bey Zavalani (1859-1935) was an Albanian landowner from the Kolonjë area, journalist and activist of the Albanian National Awakening. He was also the editor of Bashkimi i Kombit (Nation's Unity), one of the most important Albanian newspapers of the era. In 1908 he became one of the head organizers of the Congress of Monastir, in which the Albanian alphabet was standardized.

== Life ==
According to Gawrych, Fehim Zavalani came from a Muslim family of Kolonjë, southern part of Albania. According to Albanian official historiography, he was born in the village of Zavalan of Dangëlli region, today's Frashër, in the outskirts of the Kolonjë area. In 1879 he went in Istanbul to study, and after that settled in Korçë in 1881. Soon after, he settled in Monastir.

In 1896, along with Sabri Frashëri and Shefqet Frashëri, his brothers-in-law, he founded the patriotic Secret Association of the Albanians of Manastir (Albanian: Organizata e Fshehtë e Shqiptareve të Manastirit) In 1905/1906, along with Gjergj Qiriazi and Bajo Topulli he founded the Secret Committee for the Liberation of Albania, one of the first çetë (armed guerilla groups) in Monastir (modern Bitola). Reflecting on guerilla activity during 1906–08, Zavalani felt that "no useful and desirable results could be obtained through written and verbal propaganda" and that preparing the public "to accept the idea of an armed revolt" was the course of action to pursue.

Ottoman authorities crippled the committee for months after learning of its activities in 1906 by removing all its leaders from Monastir, except for Zavalani. In Monastir Zavalani also founded the organization Bashkimi, whose alphabet proposal would become the official alphabet of Albania, and became the editor of Bashkim i Kombit, the organization's newspaper. After the newspaper published an eye-witness account of a massacre perpetrated by the Ottoman army in northern Albania, the Ottoman authorities arrested Zavalani and the rest of the staff of Bashkimi i Kombit.

On October 8, 1908 Luigj Gurakuqi proposed him to organize a conference for the standardization of the Albanian alphabet.

The conference, known as the Congress of Monastir, was organized by Bashkimi club in Zavalani's house in Monastir and led by Zavalani from November 14 to November 22, 1908. Fehim Zavalani held the introductory speech at the congress and was one of its delegates. Other delegates of the congress from his family include Izet Zavalani, delegate of Florina and Gjergj Zavalani. By July 23–28, 1909 he was one of main participants and the leader of the Albanian faction of the Congress of Dibra, organized in Debar by the Young Turk association Union and Progress. The Young Turks aimed to impose an ottomanization of the Albanian society. Zavalani was one of the group of the Albanian nationalists who declined to sign off on the already prepared document, and instead forced the organizers to accept a series of articles in the final document, one of the most important of which was to allow the Albanian language to be taught in elementary schools freely.

Fehim Zavalani's son, Tajar Zavalani (1903–1966), was an important Albanian historian, journalist, and translator. He started in 1940 the BBC Radio service in the Albanian language where he was the speaker for 26 years until his death in 1966.

== Bibliography ==
- Skendi, Stavro (1967). The Albanian national awakening. Princeton: Princeton University Press. ISBN 9781400847761.
- Zavalani, Gjergj. "Jeta me dritë e një atdhetari : (Fehim Zavalani)" [Life with light of a patriot: (Fehim Zavalani)]. Drita (in Albanian). IV, 3, c (30 march 2003).
