= Orhan Pojani =

Albanian figure known for the Albanian independence movement

Orhan bey Pojani (1846–1913) was a prominent figure involved in the Albanian National Awakening.

Orhan and his family were Muslim Albanians, originally from Pojan (hence their surname). Founded in early 1880s, the magazine Drita by 1884 was led by Pojani along with Jovan Kosturi and Thimi Marko while it was distributed throughout Toskëria (southern Albania) and it advocated for Albanian language education in the Tosk dialect. He supported the Albanian educational movement and was also an executor of wealthy benefactor Anastas Avramidhi-Lakçe's will. Pojani was one of four trustees of the boys school in Korçë and in 1903 Ottoman authorities concerned with Albanian education and national sentiments arrested and exiled him to Anatolia. In 1906, Greek bishop Photios was assassinated by an Albanian guerilla band and as Ottoman authorities could not arrest the assassins, Pojani and other Albanian notables involved in the national movement from Korçë were imprisoned but released soon.
