= Battle of Mashkullorë =

Part of the armed resistance of Çerçiz Topulli

- Part of the Albanian Revolts
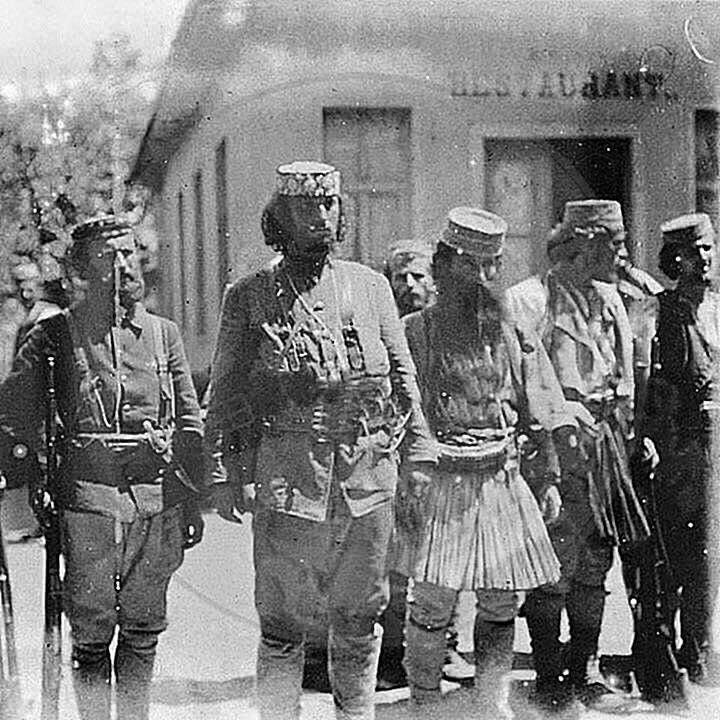
- Çerçiz Topulli with his Albanian rebels
Date	March 18, 1908
Location	Mashkullorë, Albania
Result	Albanian victory

Belligerents
Albanian rebels	Ottoman Empire

Commanders and leaders
Çerçiz Topulli (WIA)	Halil Musa Bey X

Strength
5	150–200

Casualties and losses
2 wounded, one of them Çerçiz Topulli	40 killed

The Battle of Mashkullorë (Albanian: Beteja e Mashkullorës) was fought on 18 March, 1908. (Note: Some sources say March 5) It took place between Albanian rebel forces, under the command of Çerçiz Topulli, and the Ottoman Empire.

== Background ==
On February 25, 1908, Çerçiz Topulli and his Albanian rebel group assassinated the Ottoman binbashi of Gjirokastër. After the assassination of the Ottoman binbashi, Çerçiz Topulli and his Albanian rebels fled to Mashkullorë, a village near Gjirokastër.

== Armed resistance in Mashkullorë ==
On March 18, the Albanian rebels were surrounded by Ottoman forces. The Ottoman forces had between 150 and over 200 soldiers and the Albanian rebels were outnumbered, nevertheless, Çerçiz Topulli was able to fight the soldiers, and emerge victorious.

The Albanian rebel group of the detachment resisted attacks of the Turkish forces for an entire day and were able to break the siege. The Turkish forces lost 40 soldiers The Albanian rebels did not lose any soldiers.

But Çerçiz Topulli and Myftar Axhemi were wounded.
