= Second Congress of Manastir =

1910 convention in Albania

The Second Congress of Manastir (Albanian: Kongresi i dytë i Manastirit) was an Albanian congress held on 2–3 April 1910 in Manastir, back then Ottoman Empire, today's Bitola in the Republic of North Macedonia. It dealt with the challenges that the Albanian language and schools faced at the time within the context of the empire, and the platform to overcome them.

== Background ==
The First Congress of Manastir of 14–22 November 1908, known as the congress of the Albanian alphabet, established a Latin script based alphabet to be used as a standard for Albanian writings, marking an important moment in the history of the Albanians. It was accepted with enthusiasm by the Albanian patriotic circles, but was not welcomed by the Ottoman authorities, the Greek Orthodox Church (there was no Albanian Orthodox church back then), and the pro-Turkish Muslim leaders. The Ottomans organized a joint Ottoman-Albanian congress in July 1909, known as the Congress of Dibra. It was seen as an attempt to convince the Muslim Albanian population to demand an alphabet based on the Arabic script, since the Latin script was "not conform the teaching of the Quran". Nevertheless, this attempt was not successful due a strong stance of a fraction of the Albanian delegates. Moreover, the Albanian schools continued to spread. During 2–9 September 1909, another congress was held in Elbasan. It dealt primary with the approach on spreading the Albanian education, considering the standard Alphabet a closed chapter. The Normal School of Elbasan was established, a milestone of the Albanian education marking the first high-education institution. The normal school prepared teachers who would be placed in newly established schools within the Albanian communities. The opposition from the pro-Turkish fractions would continue, encouraged by the authorities. An open meeting was organized in Monastir on 6 February 1910 by Rexhep Voka from Tetovo and Arif Hikmet of Kumanovo, where it was demanded the introduction of an Arabic-scripts based alphabet for the Muslim population. Similar meetings were organized in Elbasan and Ohrid (where around 3,000 people attended) soon after. As a countermeasure, the Albanian nationalists organized on 27 February another meeting at Shën Ilia near Korçë in support of the Latin-script alphabet, such meeting would be known later in the Albanian historiography as the "Albanian alphabet meeting". At the point, it was decided that another follow up congress should be held in order to bring a final end to the oppositions affirming the decisions of the first congress.

== Event ==
The congress was organized by the "Bashkimi" (The union) society branch of Monastir, which was itself represented by 5 members. The sessions were held in "Bashkimi"'s premises as well. A strong support came from the Albanian activist Salih Gjuka, recently appointed as Inspector of Education for the Vilayet of Monastir. Other "Bashkimi" branches which sent delegates were from Ohrid (2 delegates, one of each was Xheladin bey Ohri), Istanbul branch represented by Dervish Hima, Korçë branch represented by Shefki Efendi, Negovan branch by Petro Nini Luarasi, Elbasan by Gani Bey Gungu, Struga by Abdullah Rushiti, Starovë by Hajdar Blloshmi, and Kočani had 1 representative. A significant fact is that for the first time in an Albanian education congress, the representation from the Vilayet of Kosovo was substantial. Kosovar participants were Bedri Pejani, Rexhep Mitrovica, Qamil Bala, Bejtullah Bey Gjilani, Shyqyri Ramadan Begu of Pristina, Salih Gjuka, Hysni Curri, and Sabit Bey of Vushtrria. Supporting telegrams arrived from the branches which could not send delegates, from Smirna, Salonika, Kolonja, Lerini, Bilisht, Durrës, Shkodër, Vlora, Berat, Tepelena, Delvina, Leskovik, Preveza, and Tirana. Other sources mention Ibrahim Jegeni as representative of the "Bashkimi" branch of Upper Dibra region, Fehim Zavalani, Rifat Zavalani, Qazim Iljaz Pasha Dibra for Monastir, Tefik Efendi Panariti representing the "Dituria" (Knowledge) society of Korçë, Xhafer Ypi representing Konitsa, and Ali Efendi Zaimi representing Yenice.
According to the local correspondent of the Serbian language Vardar newspaper, "out of 24 in total, beside two Protestant Christians, the rest were Muslims, affirming the level of the national-political conscience between the Muslim population".
The congress operated with open sessions. On 4 April, the participants had tête-à-tête discussions in privacy. Bedri Pejani, former professor of the Albanian language in the high school of Uskub was elected chairman, and Petro Nini Luarasi with Ferid Ypi (a lawyer from Monastir) as secretaries. The congress decisions were mostly accepted unanimously.

Some of the important decisions as published by Vardar, no. 20, of 10 April 1910 in Skopje:

- A pan-Albanian congress would follow up in Yanina on 3 July 1910, which would establish a political platform and close once and for all the topics of the Albanian alphabet and schools.
- The Latin-script alphabet was accepted for the Albanian language.
- A request would be sent to the Wali and the Ottoman Albania representatives in the Ottoman parliament, demanding protection for the Albanian Orthodox Church, and halting the Greek propaganda. (This request was initiated by Petro Luarasi).
- An Albanian language newspaper to be opened in Uskub (Skopje), and the Albanians schools should continue to spread.
- An interpretation would be required by the Shaykh al-Islām, explaining if the Latin script created any contradiction with what was written in the Quran.
- An Albanian delegation would meet with the Sultan during his pronounced visit in the Monastir and Kosovo Vilayets. The delegation would require a general amnesty for all Albanian rebels, accepting on the other side that they fulfilled their military service duty in the Ottoman army.

Other less important decisions dealt with the organization and operation of the Albanian language societies and clubs.

The final declaration stated that:

The pure linguistic question of the Albanian alphabet, which had definitely been solved in the Congress of Diber, has come up again and as caused crisis and contradictory currents of opinion. This question, which interests solely the Albanian element, has even acquired an internal political significance since it regards education in the whole Ottoman Empire and the interest of the authorities. The government...has encouraged the adherents of the Turkish language to carry out regrettable acts incompatible with the constitutional regime which we enjoy...
The congress unanimously states that the question of the Albanian language, however much it has deviated from its basis, belongs exclusively to the Albanians; and it is desirable, in the true Ottoman interest, that it should not be taken out of its natural sphere.

== Aftermath ==
The congress was successful in the prism of its goals. A clear respond was sent to the Ottomans that the Latin-script would be the only one, "the alphabet of the Albanian people", and confirmed continuity of the decision that came out of the first congress of 1909. Despite the difficulties, the Albanian language education continued to spread. The Young Turk government suppressed all schools, patriotic societies and clubs (even the "Bashkimi" one) after the Albanian Revolt of 1910. With the revolt of 1911 and 1912, the status will be regained. The First Balkan War would start the series of events which reshaped the configuration within the Balkans and brought an end to the Ottoman rule, ending as well the endeavors of the Albanian language status within the Ottoman Empire.

== See also ==
- Category:Second Congress of Manastir delegates
- Congress of Elbasan
