= Spiro Kosturi =

Albanian activist

Spiro Jovan Kosturi (? – 11 November 1906), also known as Spiro Kosturi, was a prominent figure involved in the Albanian National Awakening.

Spiro Kosturi was the son of Jovan Kosturi, a figure in the Albanian national movement. Kosturi was one of four trustees of the boys school in Korçë and in 1903 Ottoman authorities concerned with Albanian education and national sentiments arrested and exiled him to Salonica. In 1906, Greek bishop Photios was assassinated by an Albanian guerilla band and some months after the event Greeks retaliated by assassinating Kosturi in Salonica. The death of Kosturi impacted the Albanian national movement that resulted in meetings being held, resolutions passed and the diaspora press like Kombi in Boston and Drita in Sofia attempted to arouse national sentiments. Kosturi was considered a martyr for the national movement in Albanian circles and toward the fight against Greeks.

Kosturi was also the brother of Idhomene Kosturi, an Albanian politician, regent and once acting Prime Minister of Albania.
