= Thimi Marko =

Albanian activist

Thimi Marko was a figure from Korçë involved in the Albanian National Awakening during the late Ottoman period.

Founded in early 1880s, the magazine Drita by 1884 was led by Marko along with Orhan Pojani and Jovan Kosturi while it was distributed throughout Toskeria (southern Albania) and it advocated for Albanian language education in the Tosk dialect. Marko in 1885 was given the task by Drita to discuss with the Greek Metropolitan and his council ("Demogerontia") the matter of introducing Albanian into Orthodox schools in Korçë, however the Ecumenical Patriarchate of Constantinople refused. Marko was one of four trustees of the boys school in Korçë and in 1903 Ottoman authorities concerned with Albanian education and national sentiments arrested and exiled him to Salonica.

A school in Korçë is named after Thimi Marko.
