= Naum Dhimitër Naçi =

Albanian teacher and patriot

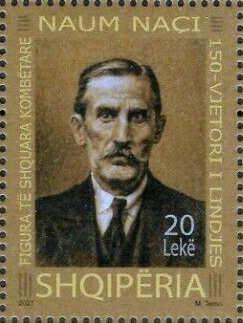
Naçi on a 2022 stamp of Albania

Naum Dhimitër Naçi (1871–1927), also known as Nuçi Naçi, was an Albanian teacher and patriot. He was the brother of Leonidha Naçi. With his intellectual and political activities, he played an important role during the late period of the Albanian National Awakening that sought independence from the Ottoman Empire and the creation of an Albanian national state. He wrote some books that discussed contemporary issues of education among Albanian communities in the Ottoman Empire, headed a Yanina-based patriotic newspaper named Zgjimi i Shqiperise, and participated in several nationalist groups. His 1901 Korça dhe fshatrat perreth saje was published in Sofia, where other major works in the development of Albanian nationalism and Albanian literature were concurrently published, including Naim Frasheri's Historia e Shqiperise and Deshira e vertete e Shqiptareve, Gjerasim Qiriazi's Hristomathi, and Sami Frasheri's Besa and Tosk primer. Naçi served for some time as the director and teacher of Mësonjëtorja, the first secular school in the Albanian language within Ottoman Albania that was opened in Korçë. At first he managed to get support from the local Ottoman governor general based in Monastir (modern Bitola). However, in 1902 Naçi was arrested and incarcerated in Salonica by Mehmed Ali Pasha Delvina, the new Ottoman governor of Korçë.

== See also ==
- Education in Albania
