= Congress of Manastir =

1908 national conference held to standardize the Albanian alphabet

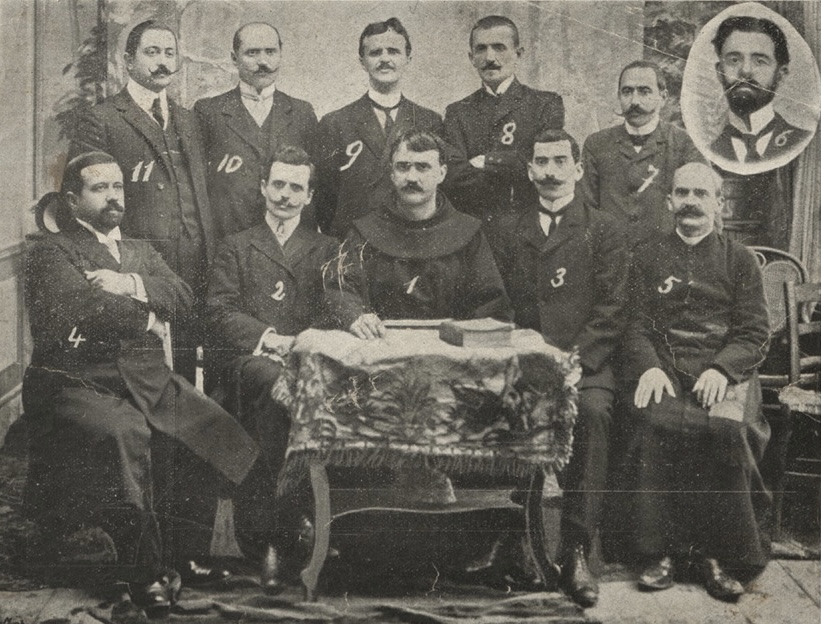
The core commission of the Congress: 1. Gjergj Fishta 2. Mid'hat Frashëri 3. Luigj Gurakuqi 4. Gjergj Qiriazi 5. Dom Ndre Mjeda 6. Grigor Cilka 7. Dhimitër Buda 8. Shahin Kolonja 9. Sotir Peci 10. Bajo Topulli 11. Nyz'het Vrioni; Photo by Kel Marubi

The Congress of Manastir (Albanian: Kongresi i Manastirit) was a national conference held in the city of Manastir (now Bitola) from November 14 to 22, 1908, with the goal of standardizing the Albanian alphabet. November 22 is now a commemorative day in Albania, Kosovo, and North Macedonia as well as among the Albanian diaspora known as Alphabet Day (Albanian: Dita e Alfabetit). Prior to the Congress, the Albanian language was represented by a combination of six or more distinct alphabets, plus a number of sub-variants.

== Participants ==
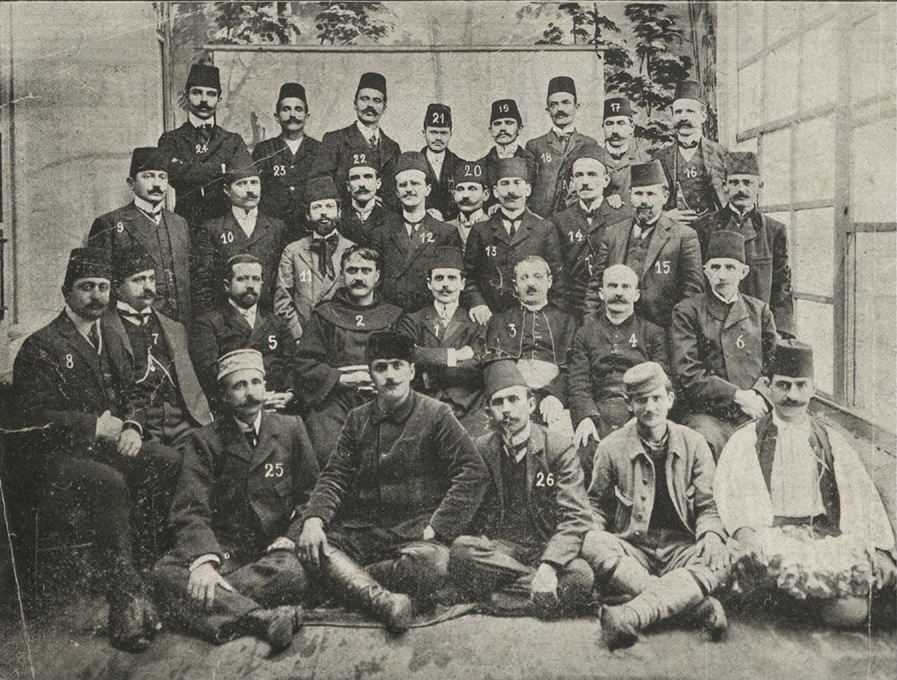
Main delegates of the Congress, from top to bottom: Row 1: Sami Pojani, Zenel Glina, Selman Elbasani, Simon Shuteriqi, Azis Starova, Mati Logoreci, Dhimitër Buda, Adham Shkaba Stratobërdha. Row 2: Rrok Berisha, Bajo Topulli, Thoma Avrami, Leonidha Naçi, Sotir Peci, Shefqet Frashëri, Luigj Gurakuqi, Shahin Kolonja, Akil Efthim Korça, Zenel Poda. Row 3: Nyz'het Vrioni, Dhimitër Mole, Gjergj Qiriazi, Gjergj Fishta, Mid'hat Frashëri, Dom Nikoll Kaçorri, Dom Ndre Mjeda, Fehim Zavalani. Row 4: Refik Toptani, Çerçiz Topulli, Mihal Grameno, Friend of Çerçiz Topulli, Member of Manastir Club. Notes: Missing in the photo are the following delegates: Hil Mosi, Grigor Cilka, Hafëz Ibrahimi, Emin Beu, Rauf Beu, Selaudin Prizreni. Names in italic are non-delegates.

The congress was sponsored by the Klubi Bashkimi (Union Club), a literary society formed in 1908. The congress was held in the rented premises of the Union Club which served as the headquarters of the union. The participants of the congress were prominent figures of the cultural and political life from Albanian-inhabited territories in the Balkans as well as throughout the Albanian diaspora. There were fifty delegates, representing twenty-three Albanian-inhabited cities, towns, and cultural and patriotic associations, of whom thirty-two had voting rights in the congress and eighteen were observers. Below is the list of the participants with the right to vote:

1. Sami Pojani
2. Zenel Glina
3. Leonidha Naçi
4. Simon Shuteriqi
5. Dhimitër Buda
6. Azis Starova
7. Adham Shkaba
8. Mati Logoreci
9. Rrok Berisha Gjakova
10. Bajo Topulli
11. Grigor Cilka
12. Sotir Peci
13. Shefqet Frashëri
14. Luigj Gurakuqi
15. Shahin Kolonja
16. Ahil Eftim Korça
17. Hilë Mosi
18. Nyz'het Vrioni
19. Dhimitër Mole
20. Gjergj Qiriazi
21. At Gjergj Fishta
22. Midhat Frashëri
23. Nikoll Kaçorri
24. Ndre Mjeda
25. Fehim Zavalani
26. Refik Toptani
27. Çerçiz Topulli
28. Mihal Grameno
29. Parashqevi Qiriazi
30. Havez Ibrahimi
31. Rauf Beu
32. Selahedin Beu

== Proceedings ==
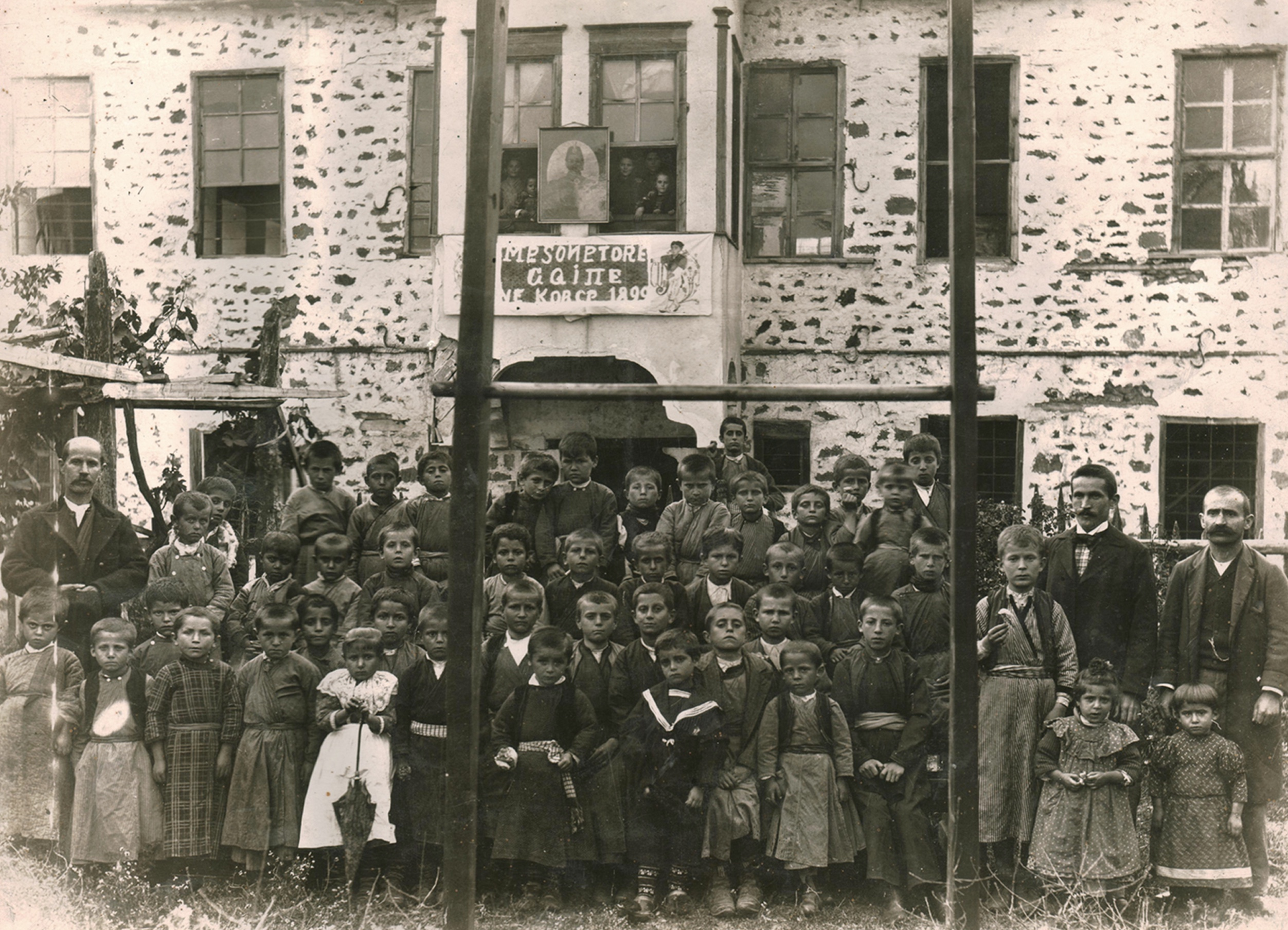
The first secular school in the Albanian language, founded in 1887 in Korçë. The picture is from 1899.

The speeches of the first two days with regard to the alphabet were general in character and helped to create the atmosphere in which to carry out the serious work. The representatives understood the importance of unity, regardless of which alphabet was chosen. Gjergj Fishta, who praised the development of the Bashkimi alphabet, declared: “I have not come here to defend any one of the alphabets, but I have come here to unite with you and adopt that alphabet which the Congress decides upon as most useful for uplifting the people”. The audience was deeply moved by Fishta. Hodja Ibrahim Effendi, a Muslim clergyman, rushed to Fishta and embraced him with tears in his eyes.

At the beginning of the Congress, the delegates elected a commission consisting of eleven members to choose the alphabet. Three were Catholic (Gjergj Fishta, Luig j Gurakuqi, Ndre Mjeda), two were Orthodox (Sotir Peci, Taqi Buda), two were Protestant (Gjergj Qiriazi, Grigor Cilka), and four were either Muslim or Bektashi (Bajo Topulli, Shahin Kolonja, Mit’hat Frashëri, Nyzhet bej Vrioni).

Gjergj Fishta was elected chairman of the commission, Parashqevi Qiriazi chairwoman and Mit'hat Frashëri its vice-chairman. Luigj Gurakuqi became the secretary of the commission while the other five members of the commission were Bajo Topulli, Ndre Mjeda, Shahin Kolonja, Gjergj Qiriazi and Sotir Peçi. Mit'hat Frashëri was also elected chairman of the congress. The delegates took a besa to accept the decision of the committee. The committee deliberated on the question of a common alphabet for three successive days. They promised, through said besa, that nothing would be known before the ultimate decision.

However, the Congress was unable to choose one single alphabet and instead opted for a compromise solution, using both the Istanbul and Bashkimi alphabets, but with some changes to reduce the differences between them. Usage of the alphabet of Istanbul declined rapidly and it became obsolete over the following years as Albania declared its independence. The Bashkimi alphabet is the predecessor of the official alphabet for the Albanian language in use today. To those who were disappointed that the Congress had chosen two written scripts rather than one, Gjergj Fishta noted that German also had two written scripts. After some discussion, the decision for the use of both the Bashkimi and Istanbul alphabets was accepted by all the delegates. It was also agreed to have every local Albanian authority report to the Union Association, monthly, about developments in their areas. Another agreement resulted in another congress in Ioannina on July 10, 1910.

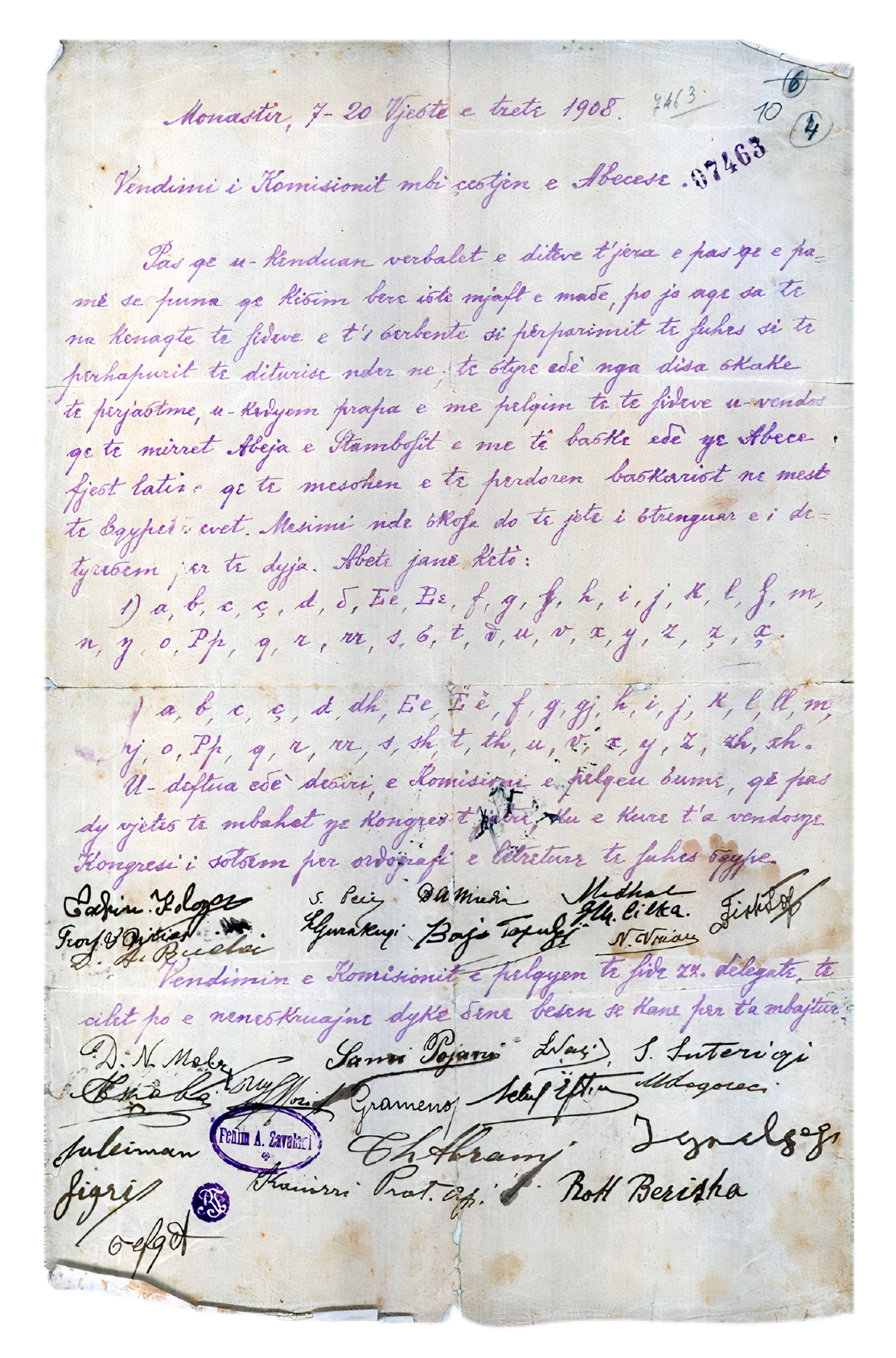
Original letter of the final decision of the Congress with signatures from all the delegates.

On November 20, when the congress was coming to an end, Hodja Vildan, Fazil Pasha and Colonel Riza, three members of the Albanian community of Istanbul, arrived. They were to attend the congress and later advise smaller, similar Albanian societies that operated throughout Albania. At first, the three members sought to protect the writing of Albanian with the use of an Ottoman Turkish alphabet. However, Hodja Vildan nullified his concerns. He denounced Sultan Abdul Hamid and defended the importance of unity among Albanians for self-determination and national spirit. Vildan argued that they had a right to use a Latin script, and that this would be a ‘tool’ for progress. He did not take the same position on the direction of writing and matters of religion, however. Said ideas continued to be defended by him in the other places the three members visited.

== Legacy ==
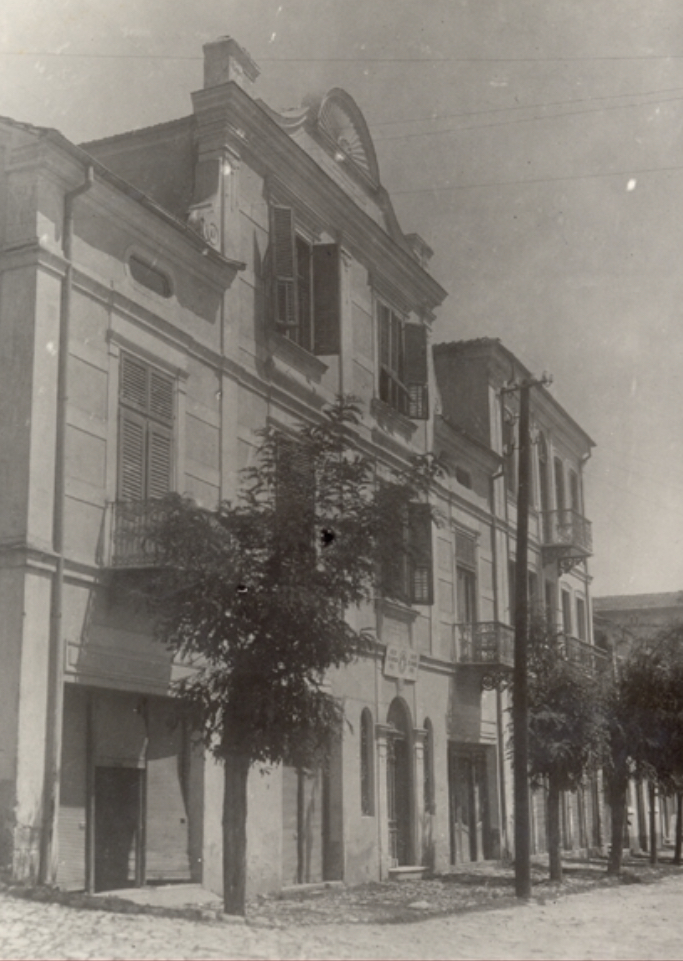
The hotel owned by Fehim Zavalani, where the congress was held in Manastir. Today, the site of the Museum of the Albanian Alphabet.

The adoption of a Latin character-based Albanian alphabet was considered an important step for Albanian unification. Some Albanian Muslims and clerics, preferring an Arabic-based alphabet, expressed their opposition towards the Latin script due to concerns that it would undermine ties with the Muslim world. The situation was also alarming for the Ottoman government, as the Albanians were the largest Muslim community in the European part of the empire, apart from the population of Istanbul. The Albanian national movement was regarded as proof that others also felt a relationship to the nation, not just Christians, and that Islam alone could not keep Ottoman Muslims united.

As a result, the Ottoman Empire organised a congress in Debar in 1909, with the intention that Albanians formally declare themselves as Ottomans, promising to defend their territorial sovereignty and adopting an Arabic-based alphabet. They faced strong opposition from nationally minded Albanians, and the Albanian element took total control of the proceedings. While the congress was progressing, members of the CUP in Tirana orchestrated a demonstration, criticising the adoption of a Latin-based alphabet to the local branch of the Union Association. Talat Bey, the interior minister, claimed that the Albanian population supported the use of the Ottoman Turkish alphabet, and not a Latin-based one. The Union Association did not stop the demonstration, instead organizing a congress with 120 attendees in Elbasan.

Due to the alphabet matter and other Young Turk policies, relations among Albanian elites, nationalists, and Ottoman authorities broke down. Though at first Albanian nationalist clubs were not curtailed, the demands for political, cultural, and linguistic rights eventually made the Ottomans adopt measures to repress Albanian nationalism, which resulted in two Albanian revolts (1910 and 1912) towards the end of Ottoman rule.

The Congress of Manastir represents one of the most important events for Albanians, and the most important after the establishment the League of Prizren, not only because of the decisions made, but also because those decisions were to be legally implemented by the Ottoman authorities. In 2008, festivities were organized in Bitola, Tirana and Pristina to celebrate the centenary of the congress. In all schools in Albania, Kosovo and Albanian-majority areas in North Macedonia, the first school hour was dedicated to honouring the Congress and teaching students about it.

== See also ==
- Congress of Elbasan
- Congress of Dibra
- Second Congress of Manastir
