= Congress of Elbasan =

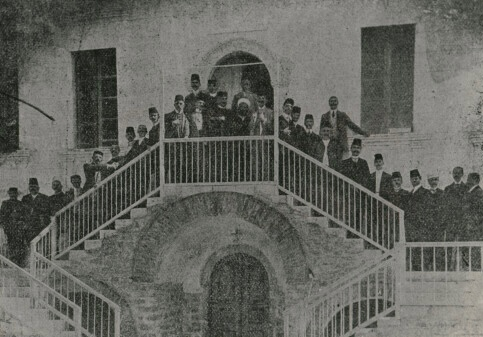
- Group photo of the participant at the congress
- Native name: Kongresi i Elbasanit
- Date: September 2–8, 1909
- Venue: Godina historike e Shkollës së Kalasë
- Location: Elbasan, Ottoman Albania
- Also known as: Congress of the Albanian schools
- Cause: To address issues linked to culture and education
- Organised by: Lef Nosi
- Outcome: The congress paved the way for secular education in the Albanian inhabited territories, it set the task of preparing educational staff, organized schools and provided funds for their maintenance, set the rules of school management with principals and elders and united all Albanians regardless of religion and province.

The Congress of Elbasan (Albanian: Kongresi i Elbasanit), also known among Albanians as the Congress of the Albanian schools (Kongresi i shkollave shqipe), was held from 2 to 8 September 1909 in Elbasan, today's Albania, back then part of the Vilayet of Monastir of the Ottoman Empire. The congress, sponsored by the local Bashkimi literary club, was attended by 35 delegates from central and southern Albania.

The congress aimed to address issues linked to culture and education. The delegates came to a decision that the Manastir club had to introduce the Albanian language in all schools in Albania. The Congress of Manastir had chosen the Latin script as the one to be used to write the language. In addition, the delegates decided to request all the Albanian journalists and publicists to use only the dialect of Elbasan. A very important result of the congress was the establishment of a school for teachers, known as Shkolla Normale e Elbasanit. The school was decided to be in Elbasan as well, and started with six classes on 1 December 1909.

== Background ==
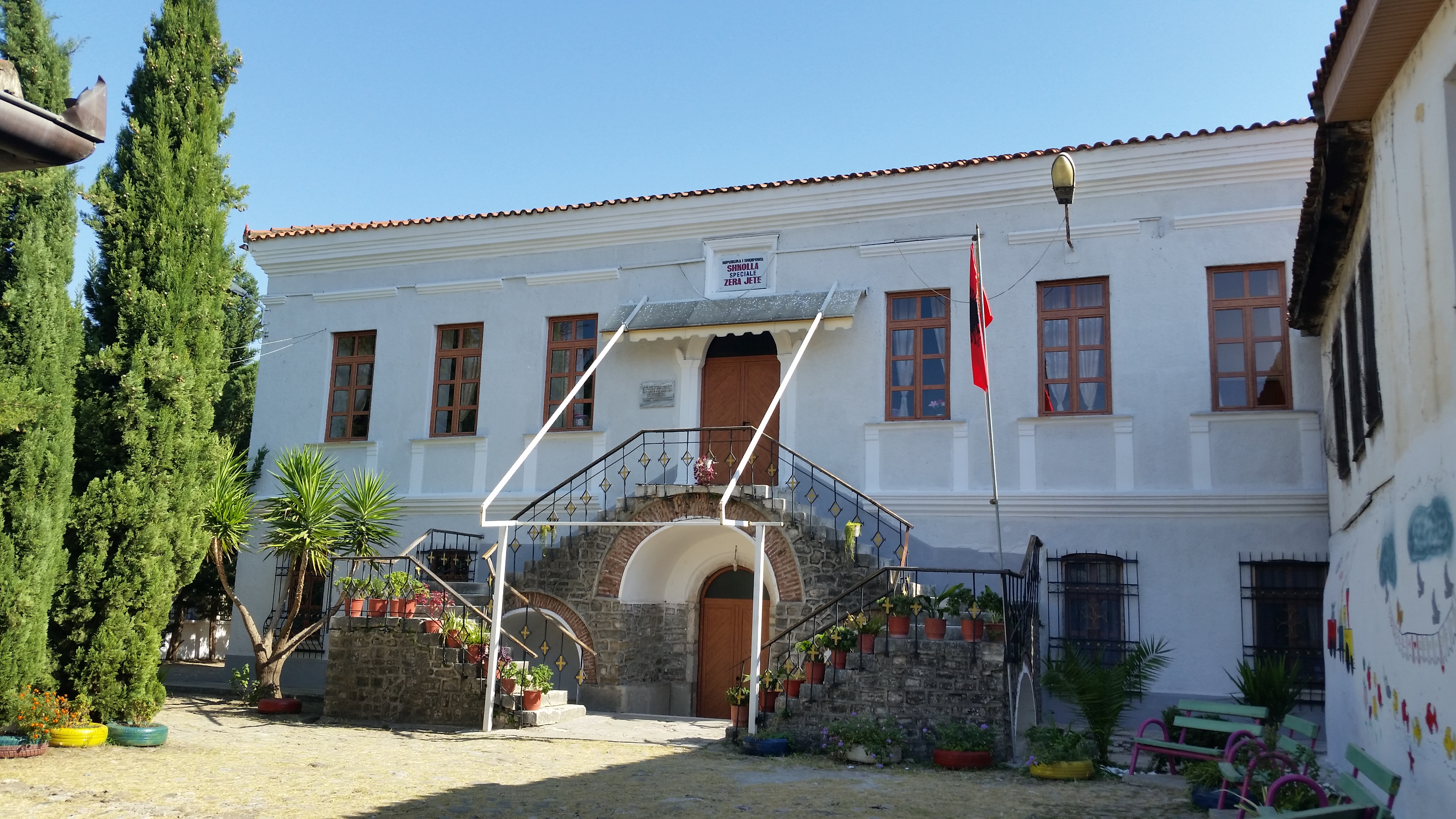
The building where Congress of Elbasan was held

In 1908, an alphabet congress in Manastir agreed to adopt a Latin character-based Albanian alphabet and the move was considered an important step for Albanian unification. Some conservative Albanian Muslims and clerics opposed the Latin alphabet and preferred an Arabic-based Albanian one because they were concerned that the former undermined ties with the Muslim world. For the Ottoman government the situation was alarming because the Albanians were the largest Muslim community in the European part of the empire (Istanbul excluded). The Albanian national movement was proof that not only Christians had national feelings and Islam could not keep Ottoman Muslims united. In these circumstances the Ottoman state led by the Committee of Union and Progress (CUP) organised a congress in Debar in 1909 with the intention that Albanians there declare themselves as Ottomans, promise to defend its territorial sovereignty and adopt an Albanian Arabic character script. However they faced a strong opposition from nationally minded Albanians and the Albanian element took total control of the proceedings. While the congress was on progress people of the CUP in Tirana orchestrated a demonstration aimed at Latin alphabet and the local branch of Bashkimi club, the organizer of the Manastir congress. Talat Bey, the interior minister, claimed that the Albanian population supported the use of the Turkish alphabet and stayed against the Latin one. However, the Bashkimi club did not stop the activity and organized a congress with 120 attendees in Elbasan.

== Delegates ==
The main organizer of Congress was the prominent patriot Lef Nosi. Different patriotic clubs authorized delegates to represent them. There were altogether 35 delegates from all over settlements with Albanian population who represented 8 clubs. The Bashkimi club had branches in sixteen settlements, the Vllazënia club in three, and the other six clubs in one each. Some delegates represented more than one club or branch. Midhat Frashëri represented five branches of Bashkimi and one of Vllazënia, while Osman Joraja represented three branches of Bashkimi and one of Vllazënia . The delegates were Abdullah Bej Koprencka (Pellazg branch in Skrapar), Abdullah Reshidi (Bashkimi branch in Struga), Abdurrahim Kavaja (Vllazenia branch in Kocanë), Ahmet Dakli (Bashkimi branch in Struga), Andrea Ikonomi (Drita branch in Gjirokastër), Dervish Beu (Vllazenia branch in Elbasan), Nikolle Kacorri (Durrës), Emin Haxhi (Bashkimi branch in Elbasan), Grigor M. Cilka (American Mission branch in Korçë), Gjergj Qiriazi (Bashkimi branch in Manastir), Hafiz Ibrahimi (Bashkimi branch in Tirana), Hamdi Beu (Bashkimi branch in Ohrid), Haxhi Bajram Beu (Bashkimi branch in Permet and Bashkimi branch in Leskovik), Idhomene Kosturi (Dituria branch in Korçë), Irfan Beu (Bashkimi branch in Ohrid), Jahja Efendiu (Durrës), Josif Haxhi Mima (Aferdita branch in Elbasan), Kahreman Beu (Bashkimi branch in Berat), Kristaq Dako (American Mission branch in Tirana), Mihal Gjuraskovici (Durrës), Midhat Frashëri (Vllazenia branch in Filiates and Bashkimi branches in Thessaloniki, Skopje, Ioannina, Jenije-Vardar, Karaferia), Orhan Beu (Dituria branch in Korçë and Bashkimi branch in Frasher), Osman Joraja (Vllazenia branch in Filiates, Bashkimi branches in Thessaloniki, Jenije Vardar, Karaferia), Qemal Beu (Bashkimi branch in Berat), Refik Beu (Bashkimi branch in Tirana), Sabri Beu (Bashkimi branch in Peqin), Selman Blloshmi (Bashkimi branch in Starove), Sevasti Qiriazi (American Mission branch in Korçë), Simon Shuteriqi (Aferdita branch in Elbasan), Sulejman Leka (Bashkimi branch in Starove), Taqi Buda (Bashkimi branch in Elbasan), Teki Bej Reshiti (Bashkimi branches in Permet and Leskovik), Telha Beu (Bashkimi branch in Gramsh), Thoma Papapano (Drita branch in Gjirokastër), Xhemil Feza (Vllazenia branch in Elbasan).

== Afterwards ==
The opposition from the pro-Turkish fractions would continue, encouraged by the authorities. In a 6 February 1910 open meeting in Monastir, organized by Rexhep Voka and Arif Hikmet, it was demanded the introduction of an Arabic-scripts based alphabet for the Muslim population. Similar meetings were organized in the cities of Elbasan and Ohrid soon after. The Albanian nationalists responded with the organization of another meeting on 27 February at Shën Ilia near Korçë in support of the Latin-script alphabet. The meeting would be known later in Albanian historiography as the "Albanian alphabet meeting". At this point, it was decided that another follow up congress should be held in order to bring a final end to the oppositions affirming the decisions of the first congress.

== See also ==
- Albanian National Awakening
- Albanian nationalism
- Congress of Dibër
- Second Congress of Manastir
