= Çerçiz Topulli =

Albanian revolutionary (1880–1915)

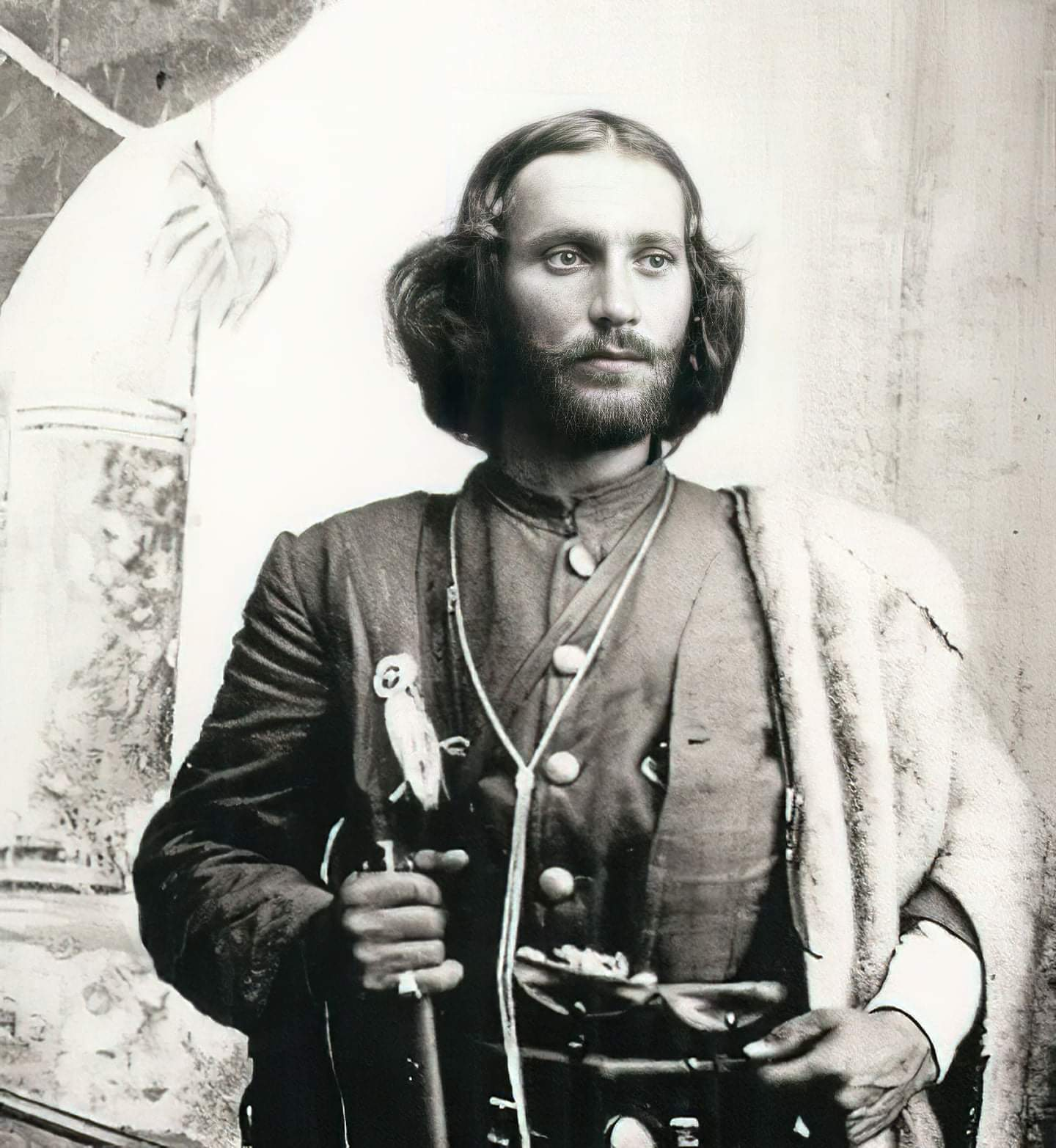
- Born: 20 September 1880; Gjirokastër, Janina Vilayet, Ottoman Empire (modern Albania)
- Died: 17 July 1915 (aged 34); Shkodër, Principality of Albania
- Relatives: Ago Topulli (father) Hasije Mullai (mother) Bajo Topulli (brother)
- Military career
- Allegiance: Albania
- Service years: 1906–1915
- Known for: serving as a Freedom Fighter and being part of the Rilindas (Revivalists)
- Conflicts: Battle of Mashkullorë; Albanian Revolt of 1912; WWI †
- Awards: Hero of the People

Çerçiz Topulli (20 September 1880 – 17 July 1915) was an Albanian revolutionary and guerrilla fighter involved in the Albanian national movement operating in the mountainous areas of southern Albania. He was the younger brother of Bajo Topulli. He was known for fighting the Ottomans before Albania declared its independence from the Ottoman Empire in 1912, as well as the Greeks and Slavs during the Balkan Wars.

== Biography ==
Çerçiz Topulli was the scion of a notable Tosk Albanian family of Gjirokastra who were Bektashi Muslims in faith. He was born to Ago Topulli and Hasije, daughter of Laze Mullai from Kardhiq.

=== Armed resistance ===
In early 1906, he and his brother Bajo Topulli founded the first Albanian armed guerrilla band. The group was active for three years, with both brothers taking a winter break during 1906-1907 and spending it in Sofia and Bucharest. Both brothers had been professionals who decided to engage in guerrilla warfare after leaving the comforts of town life. The guerrilla band viewed the Ottoman regime of Abdul Hamid II along with Greeks and Slavs as the enemy.

The purpose was to spread Albanian national consciousness among the people, including the immediate need for administrative autonomy for Albanians within the Ottoman Empire. They also brought books in Albanian for the people. He wrote an article "From the Mountains of Albania" in the journal "The Hope of Albania" in its issue. In that article, he condemned the many thefts that the Turkish administration would commit toward the Albanians and asked for the full independence of Albania. In the article, he made calls for an armed insurgency. Soon, campaigns of agitation were prepared so as to lead an armed uprising in 1908.

The armed bands of Çerçiz Topulli cooperated and were on good terms with armed groups of Bulgarian-Macedonian revolutionaries operating in the Lake Prespa region and Kastoria area, a bond formed due to their hostility toward Greeks.

On 25 February 1908, Çerçiz and his followers had assassinated the Ottoman binbashi Binbaşı (Lieutenant Colonel) of Gjirokastër, who had brutally suppressed those Albanians working for Albanian political ends. Five of them, including Çerçiz Topulli, then fled to Mashkullorë, a village near the town of Gjirokastër. On 18 March they were surrounded in Mashkullorë by Ottoman forces from Yanya (modern Ioannina).

==== Young Turk Revolution (1908) and post revolution ====
During the Young Turk Revolution (1908), Adjutant Major Ahmed Niyazi Bey devoted his energies toward recruiting Çerçiz whom he regarded as "the Chief of the Tosk Committee of Albanians". Niyazi sent a letter to Topulli inviting him for a meeting to talk about conditions for a union with the Young Turks (CUP).

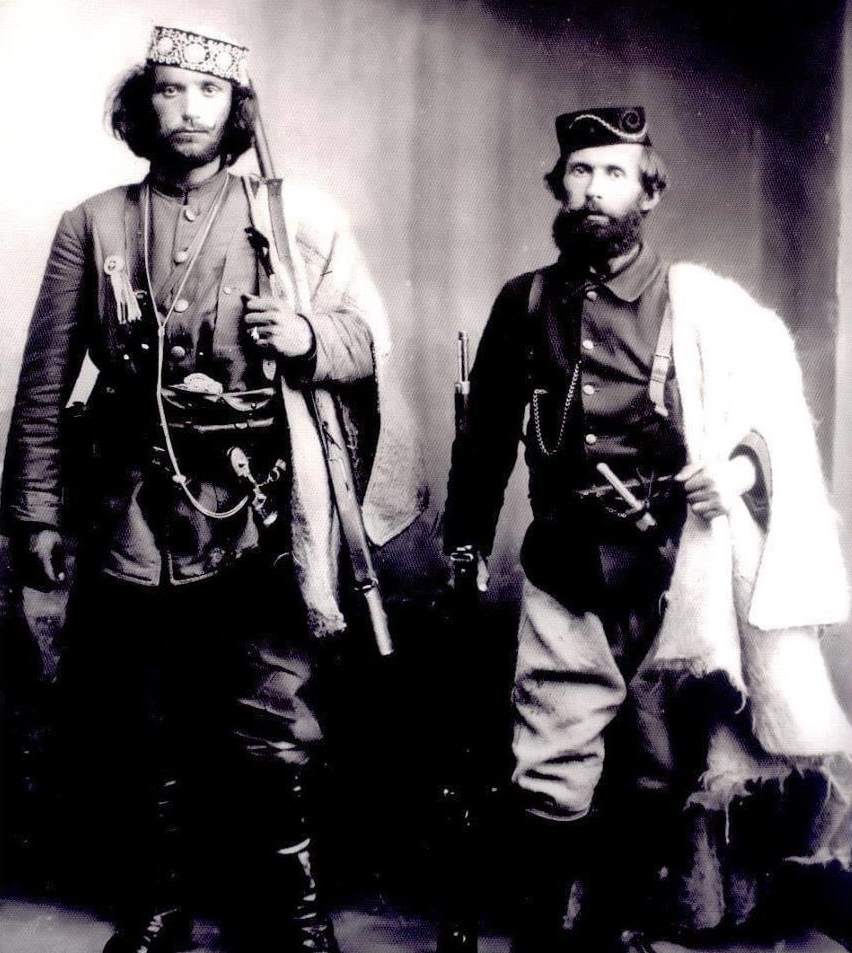
Cerciz Topulli And Mihal Grameno in 1908 or 1909

Albanian representatives met with Niyazi in Korçë. After the discussion Albanian delegates accepted the CUP invitation. All joined through an oath ceremony and were enrolled with promises to bring Topulli and other prominent Albanian committee members for a final meeting to talk about details of the agreement.

Hyrsev Starova Bey, a local Albanian notable and friend of Niyazi's father was tasked with arranging the meeting that was scheduled to occur in Pogradec. Hyrsev also contacted Hysen Baba, an Albanian Bektashi sheikh from the Melçan tekke who acted as mediator between Topulli and Niyazi that influenced the latter along with other brigand leaders to support the CUP cause. Niyazi viewed the meeting as mainly unimportant due to local Albanians already pledging allegiance to the CUP. During negotiations with Albanian committee members the significance of Albanian participation made Niyazi remark that "most of the leaders and partisans of [the movement for] constitutional administration were not Turkish". The Korçë Albanian committee lent support to Niyazi and at the request of the CUP called upon guerrillas based in the mountains around Korçë to join Ottoman insurgent bands with the Ohri Albanian committee heeding the directive. Topulli was hard pressed by fellow Albanians to meet with Niyazi to talk about joint action and he arrived in Pogradec with his band on 21 July 1908. An oath of alliance was made by Topulli for the CUP cause.

Ottoman documents depicted as the most important Albanian band being the group under Topulli's command consisting of 50 individuals, "Muslims and Bulgarians" while there is no clarity about if these Bulgarians belonged to the Internal Macedonian Revolutionary Organization (IMRO) or they just joined to fight Greek bands. Niyazi described that Albanian Tosk bands and Bulgarian bands had been united under Topulli in Ohri. Topulli's guerrilla band gave important support to Niyazi and his forces during their capture of the Resne garrison and the event was a small military victory in the campaign to oust the Hamidian regime. During July 1908, Topulli attempted to take the town of Korçë, but his forces were pushed back by Ottoman troops. On 23 July Niyazi met with guerrilla leaders Topulli and Mihal Grameno in Resne where he expressed his gratitude and viewed the declaration of the CUP constitution as advantageous for the Albanian nation. Topulli alongside Niyazi and Grameno appeared in photographs taken by the Manakis brothers during the revolution.

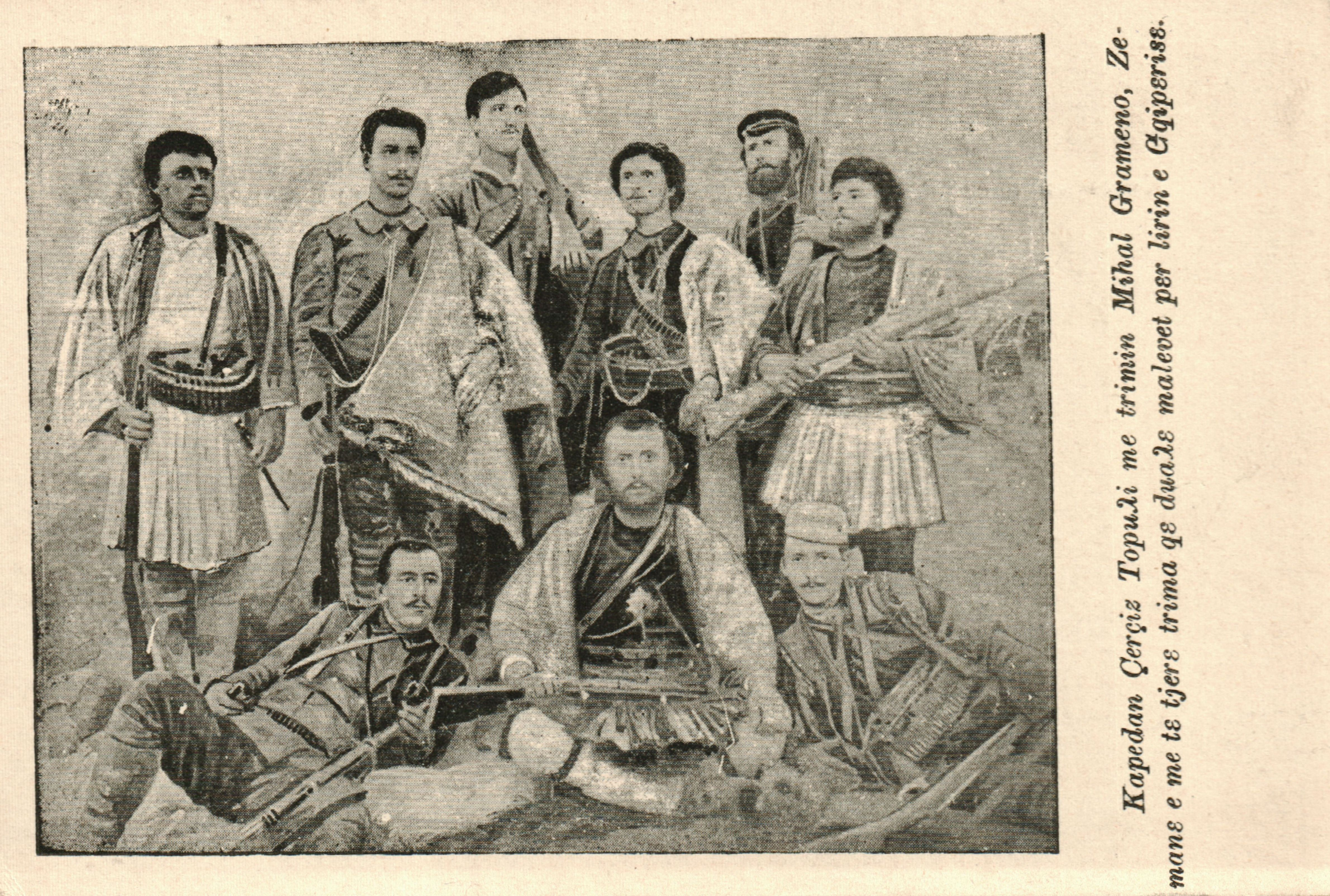
Guerrilla band (çetë) of Çerçiz Topulli and Mihal Grameno in the late Ottoman period

Individuals that were less prominent "heroes" of the revolution like Topulli had their image distributed through media tools of the time. For example on postcards Topulli appears in an image alongside Atıf Bey and Adem Bey symbolising the cooperation of different communal groups of people involved in the revolution.

During the 31 March Incident, among the 15,000 volunteers assisting the larger Ottoman army Topulli along with Bajram Curri mobilized 8,000 Albanians that put down the revolt in Istanbul.

Topulli, a former ally of the CUP commented that there was no further need "to shed a single drop of blood for the Turks anymore". He was of the view that Albanians were "one of the most perfect branches of the European races" and had no commonalities with an empire whose roots were from peoples originating from the Asian steppe.

=== After independence ===
After the proclamation of the independence of Albania on 28 November 1912 Topulli was also active in the defense of national interests after independence.

Topulli went to the north to help with the efforts against Montenegrin forces. He was killed in the Fusha e Shtoit (Shkodër) by the Montenegrin forces.

In 1937 his bones were brought back to Gjirokastër.
