= Katerina Cilka =

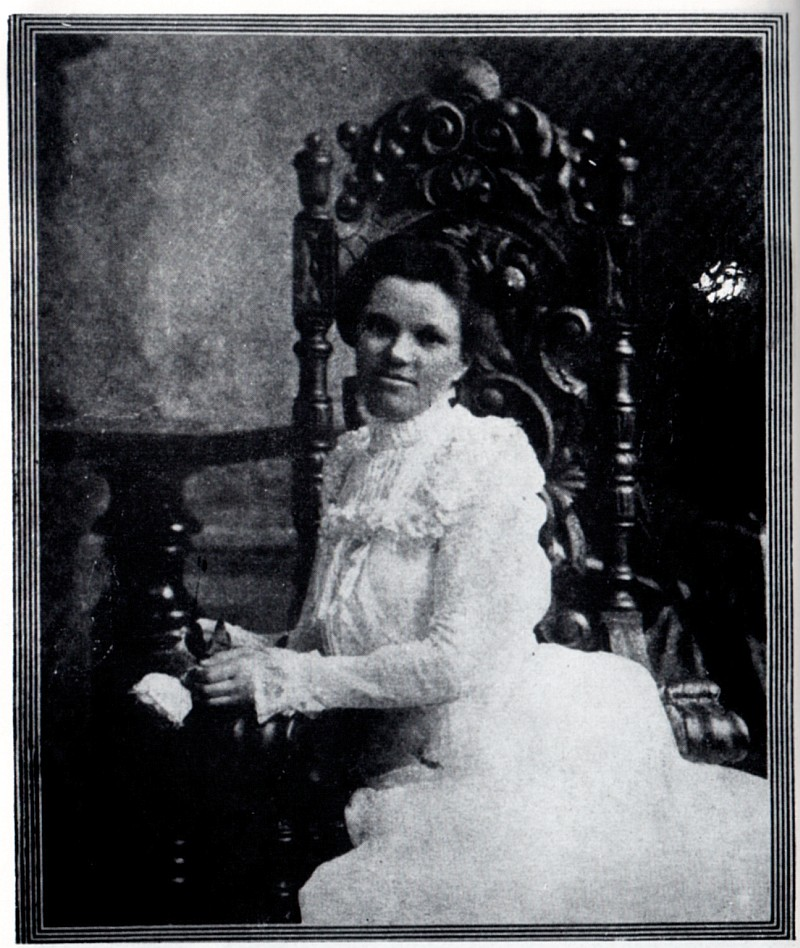
- Katerina Cilka
- Born: Katerina Dimitrova Stefanova; 1868; Bansko, Ottoman Empire (present-day Bulgaria)
- Died: 22 June 1952 (aged 83–84); Tirana, Albania
- Occupations: Nurse, teacher, missionary

Katerina Cilka (Bulgarian: Катерина Цилка; 1868 – 22 June 1952) was a Bulgarian Protestant missionary from Bansko, abducted for ransom by a detachment of the pro-Bulgarian Inner Macedonian Revolutionary Organization (IMRO) in 1901 and released in 1902.

== Early life and education ==
She was born as Katerina Dimitrova Stefanova (Bulgarian: Катерина Димитрова Стефанова) in Bulgarian Protestant family in the Ottoman Empire's town of Bansko in 1868. Later she graduated from the American Board School at Samokov, Bulgaria. Cilka was a sister of the Sofia University Professor Constantine Stephanove. She moved to the United States to study at the Northfield Seminary and the Charity Nursing School of the Presbyterian Hospital (New York City). Cilka met in New York and married Grigor Cilka, an Albanian Protestant who studied at the United Theological Seminary. They returned to the Balkans and settled in Korçë.

== Kidnapping ==
In the summer of 1901, Cilka helped Ellen Stone, who had to take a short training course for Bulgarian teachers in primary Protestant schools in her native Bansko. On 3 September 1901, Yane Sandanski and Hristo Chernopeev's chetas abducted both Stone and Cilka. Their captivity lasted 4 months and became known as the Miss Stone Affair. They were set free on 2 February 1902 near the town of Strumica.

== Later life ==
After the Balkan Wars, she and her husband moved to Sofia. There Grigor died after the First World War from the Spanish flu. After his death, she went to live in Albania. She died in Tirana on 22 June 1952.
