= Congress of Dibër =

1909 congress

Ottoman-Albanian Joint Constitutional Congress
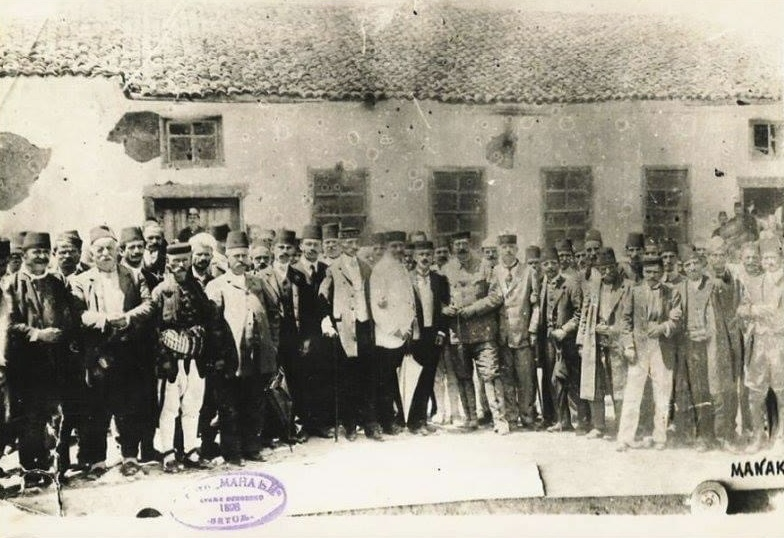
- Native name: Kongresi i Dibrës
- English name: Congress of Dibër
- Date: 23–29 July 1909
- Location: Debre, Manastir Vilayet, Ottoman Empire
- Organised by: Committee of Union and Progress (İttihat ve Terakki Cemiyeti)

The Congress of Dibër (original name promoted by the Ottoman authorities: Ottoman-Albanian Joint Constitutional Congress) was a congress held by members of Albanian committee in Debar (then part of the Ottoman Empire, now part of North Macedonia) from July 23 to July 29, 1909. The congress was chaired by Vehbi Dibra, Grand Mufti of the Sanjak of Dibra and was sponsored by the government of the Young Turks. It was held on the first anniversary of the Young Turk Revolution and was a countermeasure on the Latin script based Albanian alphabet which came out of the Congress of Manastir.

== Background ==
In 1908, an alphabet congress in Manastir agreed to adopt a Latin character-based Albanian alphabet and the move was considered an important step for Albanian unification. Some conservative Albanian Muslims and clerics opposed the Latin alphabet and preferred an Arabic-based Albanian one because they were concerned that a Latin script undermined ties with the Muslim world. For the Ottoman government the situation was alarming because the Albanians were the largest Muslim community in the European part of the empire (Istanbul excluded). The Albanian national movement was a proof that not only Christians had national feelings and Islam could not keep Ottoman Muslims united. In these circumstances the Ottoman state organised a congress in Debar in 1909 with the intention that Albanians there declare themselves as Ottomans, promise to defend its territorial sovereignty and adopt an Albanian Arabic character script.

The initiative for the congress was superficially taken by an Ottoman Albanian Constitutional Committee (Osmanli arnaut meşrutiyet komisioni) in Debar. However the entire organization was formed by the Young Turks. Invitations were first sent to Albanians so as to give the impression that the congress was an Albanian assembly. Gradually all other nationalities of the Albanian and Macedonian vilayets, excluding the Greeks, were welcomed to send delegates. The reason of the congress was not unveiled producing suppositions. Two days before beginning of proceedings, Fahri Pasha, Wali of Manastir told consuls in Manastir that with the organization of congress was aimed at persuading Albanians to abandon independence ideals.

== Proceedings ==
Most of the delegates were Muslim Albanians, others included 95 Christians. Some of the Young Turks present were officers dressed in civilian clothes. The Young Turks wanted, through Vehbi Dibra to force the attendees to agree with the program. Among other issues the Young Turks had prepared for discussion was the geopolitical question of Crete and military service for all subjects of the Ottoman Empire while they tried to neglect those related to Albanianism. Strong opposition toward the Young Turks came from nationally minded Albanians including Abdul Ypi who delivered a fiery speech. The differences produced clashes and the meeting was temporarily suspended. Later a committee was formed to decide on the program. The main goal of the Young Turks was to show the European and Ottoman public that Albanians were ready to protect the Constitution and did not have separatist aims. Additionally the Young Turks wanted to force acceptance of the Arabic alphabet by the Albanians. Support for the positions of the Young Turks came from many delegates. The Albanian element however took total control of the proceedings and rejected the request of the Young Turks to declare themselves Ottomans, promise to fight for the empire and write with Arabic letters. The final compromise decision of the congress was that the Albanian language should taught freely, the Albanians could write with any alphabet they wanted and elementary, secondary and commercial schools and lyćees should be opened in every part of Albania. Additional demands adopted were for justice in the courts, tax reforms, infrastructure, permission to keep their weapons, the delineations of frontiers and military service only within Albanian territory. In the end of proceedings, it was decided that other similar congresses would be held each coming year in other settlements across the European part of the Empire.

== Aftermath ==
While the congress was on progress people of CUP in Tirane orchestrated a demonstration aimed at Latin alphabet and the local branch of Bashkimi club, the organizer of the Manastir congress. Talat Bey, the interior minister, claimed that the Albanian population supported use of the Turkish alphabet and stayed against the Latin one. However the Bashkimi club organized a congress with 120 attendees in Elbasan. Its decisions included the establishment of a school for teachers, foundation of Society of Albanian Schools, propagation of Albanian written with Latin letters in every school throughout Albania and selection of the Elbasan dialect as the standard literary language for all Albanians. An open meeting was organized in Monastir on 6 February 1910 by Rexhep Voka from Tetovo and Arif Hikmet of Kumanovo, where it was demanded the introduction of an Arabic-scripts based alphabet for the Muslim population. Similar meetings were organized in Elbasan and Ohrid soon after. As a countermeasure, the Albanian nationalists organized on 27 February another meeting at Shën Ilia near Korçë in support of the Latin-script alphabet, such meeting would be known later in the Albanian historiography as the "Albanian alphabet meeting". At the point, it was decided that another follow up congress should be held in order to bring a final end to the oppositions affirming the decisions of the first Manastir Congress.

== Importance ==
Even with Albanian patriots' efforts, the congress, as an event organized by the Young Turks, failed to become a manifestation of all Albanian ideals for independence and cultural expression. The decision to allow every school to choose its alphabet was intended to open conflicts among Albanians, and derail the achievements towards a single alphabet. However, Albanian patriots were successful in the context of forcing some of their requests on the delegates of the Young Turks. The approval of those requests confronted the policies of cultural repression and assimilation. Moreover, it did not prevent Albanian patriots from the organization of the Congress of Elbasan, that was a strong expression of the national aspirations of the Albanians.

== See also ==
- Second Congress of Manastir
