= Photios of Korytsa =

Greek Orthodox bishop (1862–1906)

Photios Kalpidis Φώτιος Καλπίδης
- Metropolitan bishop of Korytsa
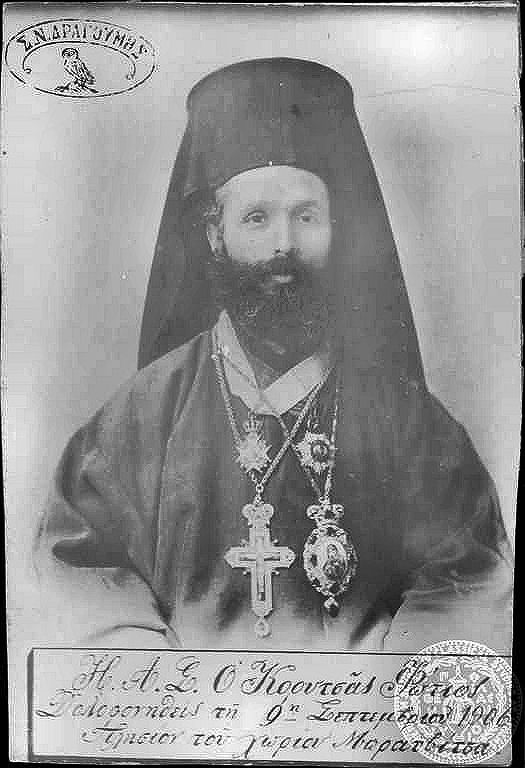
- Church: Greek Orthodox Church
- In office: 1902–1906

Personal details
- Born: 1862 Cakrak, Trabzon Vilayet, Ottoman Empire
- Died: 1906 (aged 43–44) Korçë, Monastir Vilayet, Ottoman Empire

Photios Kalpidis (Greek: Φώτιος Καλπίδης, 1862–1906) or Photios of Korytsa was the Greek Orthodox metropolitan bishop of Korçë, Ottoman Empire, from 1902 to 1906. He was assassinated in 1906 by irregular bands due to his pro-Greek activity. Photios was proclaimed a national martyr ("ethnomartyr") by the Church of Greece.

== Life ==
Photios was born in 1862 in the village of Çakrak, in Pontus region, Ottoman Empire. After finishing school he moved to Constantinople and attended the Halki seminary. He graduated in 1889 with honors. The following year he was ordained hierodeacon, while he also became director of the Greek school of Giresun. In 1897 Photios was appointed secretary of the Holy Synod of the Ecumenical Patriarchate.

In 1902 Photios was appointed metropolitan bishop of Korçë and Përmet, centered in Korçë, modern southeast Albania (then part of the Ottoman Empire). In general, Photios showed great interest in the promotion of the thriving Greek educational system among the local youth and often made various proposals. He also became the president of the city's schools committee. In 1903 he was actively involved in all major educational issues that concerned the schools in Korçë, as well as in nearby Përmet. During the 1903–1904 school year he proposed that sports activities should be part of the curriculum in the local schools. As a result, the first sports events by the pupils of Korçë took place on May 30, 1904, in the local Bangas Gymnasium. In the following school year these events attracted a major part of the local population and officials who attended them.

On June 7, 1904, Photios took the initiative for the creation of the Appollo music association and the charitable society Love thy Neighbour as part of his educational, cultural and social initiatives in Korça. Moreover, Appollo for a short term period was also undertaking concerts and theatrical performances.

== Assassination ==
Photios was assassinated on September 9, 1906 in Bradvicë, allegedly by Albanian Spiro Kosturi (or by Aromanians Apostol Kushkona and Athanas Nasto, according to another version), member of a band of Albanian kachak nationalists, led by Bajo Topulli. The original intention was to assassinate the Metropolitan of Kastoria, Philaretos. The assassination was perpetrated because Photios was against the development of Albanian and Aromanian cultural activities, as well to avenge the murder of the Albanian priest Papa Kristo Negovani in 1905. Photios had already escaped an assassination attempt in Plasë, in 1905. Although the arrests included many Albanian nationalists of the time, they were subsequently released by the Ottoman authorities.

Kalpidis was proclaimed a national martyr ("ethnomartyr") by the Church of Greece. A number of streets are named after him as Fotiou Koritsas (Φωτίου Κορυτσάς) in suburbs around the port city of Piraeus, within the Athens urban area. (Note: These include: 1. "Φωτίου Κορυτσάς." Κερατσίνι (Keratsini) 18757.; 2. "Φωτίου Κορυτσάς." Πειραιάς (Piraeus).; 3. "Φωτίου Κορυτσάς." Πλατεία Υμηττού 17237.; 4. "Φωτίου Κορυτσάς." Υμηττός (Ymittos) 17237.)

== Sources ==
- Koltsida, Athina (2008). Η Εκπαίδευση στη Βόρειο Ήπειρο κατά την Ύστερη Περίοδο της Οθωμανικής Αυτοκρατορίας [Education in Northern Epirus during the Latter Ottoman Period] (pdf) (in Greek). Aristotle University of Thessaloniki. (PhD Thesis)

Eastern Orthodox Church titles
Preceded by Gervasios (Orologas); 1895–1902	Bishop of Korytsa and Premeti; 1902–1906	Succeeded by Gervasios (Sarasitis); 1906–1910
