= Bajo Topulli =

Albanian nationalist

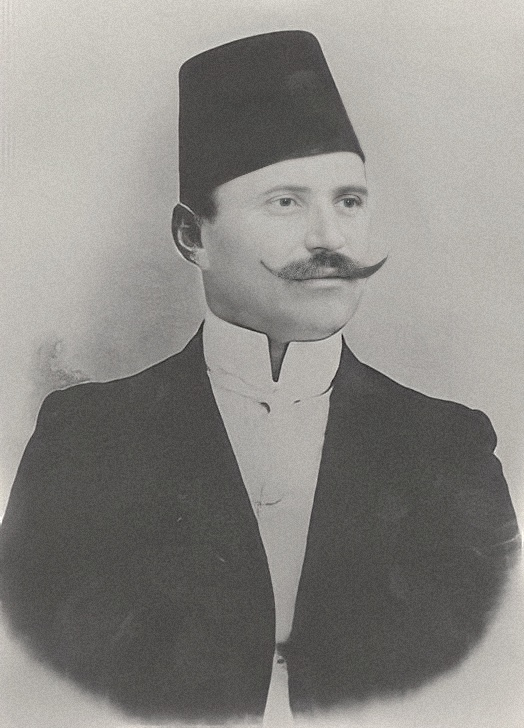
- Bajo Topulli in a rare photo
- Born: Bajram Fehmi Topulli; 1868; Gjirokastër, Janina Vilayet, Ottoman Empire (modern Albania)
- Died: 24 July 1930 (aged 61–62); Sarandë, Kingdom of Albania
- Occupations: Teacher, Politician
- Movement: Albanian National Revival
- Spouse: Merushe Topulli
- Parents: Ago Topulli (father); Hasije Mullai (mother)
- Family: Çerçiz Topulli (brother)
- Awards: Hero of the People

Bajo Topulli (1868 – 24 July 1930), born Bajram Fehmi Topulli, was an Albanian nationalist figure of the Albanian National Awakening. Bajo was the older brother of Çerçiz Topulli.

== Biography ==
Bajo Topulli was a Muslim Tosk Albanian, scion of a notable family of Gjirokastra, born to Ago Topulli and Hasije, daughter of Laze Mullai from Kardhiq.

In Monastir while he was a director in the Ottoman Secondary school (idadiye) Topulli founded in November 1905 the Secret Committee for the Liberation of Albania. Members of the committee were tasked with preparation for armed activities against the Ottoman Empire and Topulli was sent for agitation to the Prespa and Korçë regions. In March 1906 at the Bektashi tekke of Melçan he and his brother Çerçiz founded the first Albanian nationalist armed guerrilla band. It was based in the Kolonjë region and consisted of several of his students from Monastir who had left their studies and some local peasants to fight against Ottoman rule. The group was active for three years, with both brothers taking a winter break during 1906-1907 and spending it in Sofia and Bucharest. Both brothers had been professionals who decided to engage in guerilla warfare after leaving the comforts of town life. The guerilla band viewed the Ottoman regime of Abdul Hamid II along with Greeks and Slavs as the enemy. On September 22, 1906, Bajo Topulli's band killed the Greek Orthodox bishop of Görice (now Korçë), Photios, who was said to be responsible for the death of Papa Kristo Negovani and to avenge the Albanian priest.

During 1907 the Bashkimi (Union) Society in Bucharest sent Topulli to Boston on a mission to the Albanian diaspora in United States to collect funds and recruit young men to join guerilla bands back in Ottoman Albania and prepare to fight in a planned uprising for 1908. In 1908, Topulli along with Shahin Kolonja went to Üsküb (modern Skopje) to establish an Albanian club for local Albanians.
