= Sabiha Kasimati =

Albanian ichthyologist

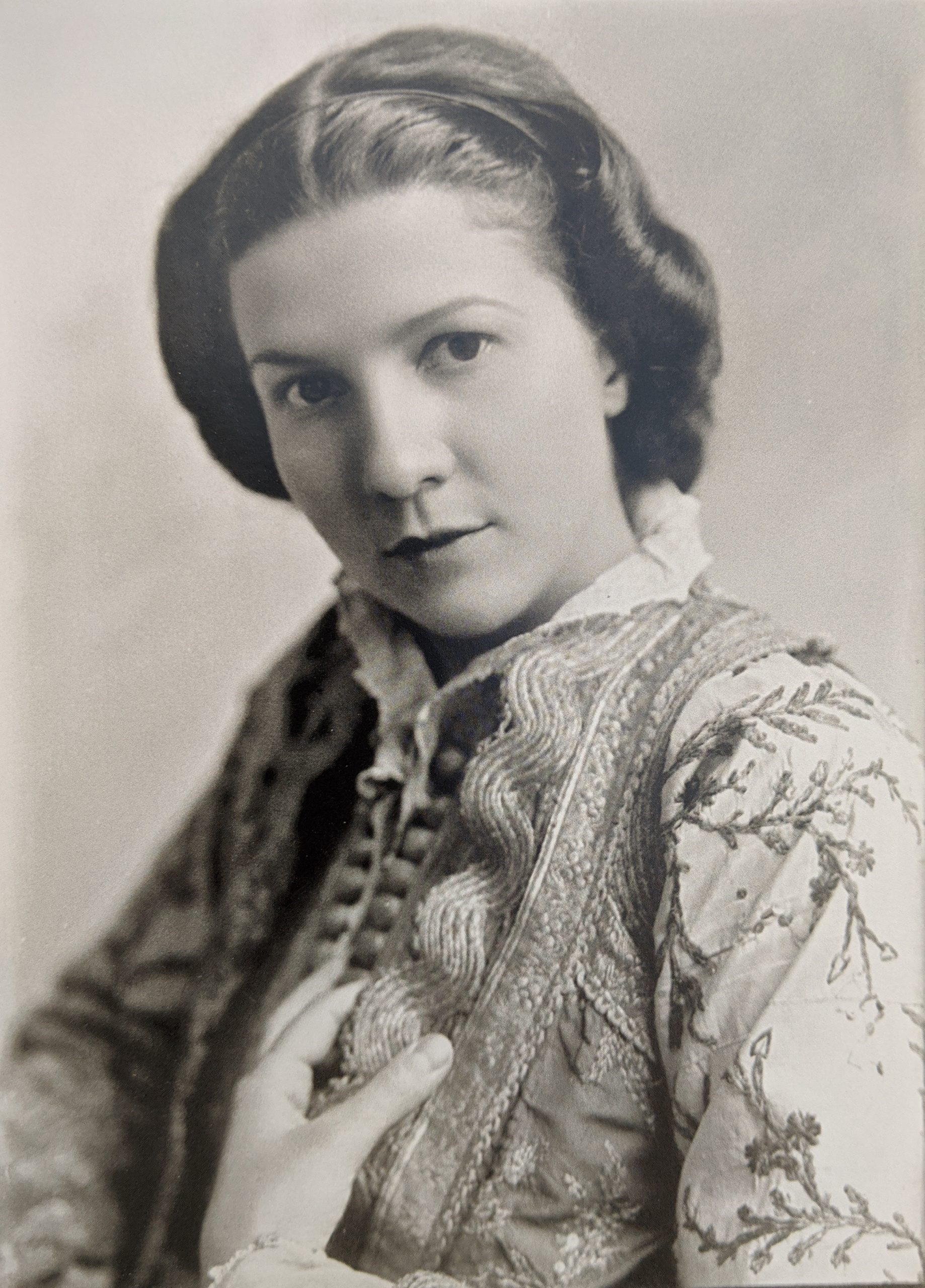
- Sabiha Kasimati posing for the photographer Kristaq Sotiri in 1942
- Born: 15 September 1912; Edirne, Ottoman Empire (modern Turkey)
- Died: 26 February 1951 (aged 38); Mënik, Tirana, Albania
- Cause of death: Execution by firing squad
- Resting place: National Martyrs' Cemetery
- Education: University of Torino (Ph.D.)
- Known for: Ichthyologist
- Scientific career
- Thesis: Fauna ittica di acqua dolce d'Albania (1941)

Sabiha Kasimati (15 September 1912 – 26 February 1951) was an Albanian professor of biology and ichthyologist, cited as one of the first women scientists in Albania. She was arrested by the communist regime on 20 February 1951, after the bombing of the Soviet embassy, and a few days later was executed without trial along with 21 other intellectuals.

== Life ==
=== Early life ===
Kasimati came from a well-known intellectual family originated from Libohova. She was born on 15 September 1912 in Edirne in the Ottoman Empire (today Turkey) to Abdurrahman Kasimati and Zehra Mbreshtani. Sabiha was the youngest of her five siblings. Her father, Abdurrahman, had completed his university studies in medicine in Turkey, where he lived and worked as a doctor until 1927. The year in which he returned to Albania and where he first settled in Korçë, then in Elbasan were served as a physician.

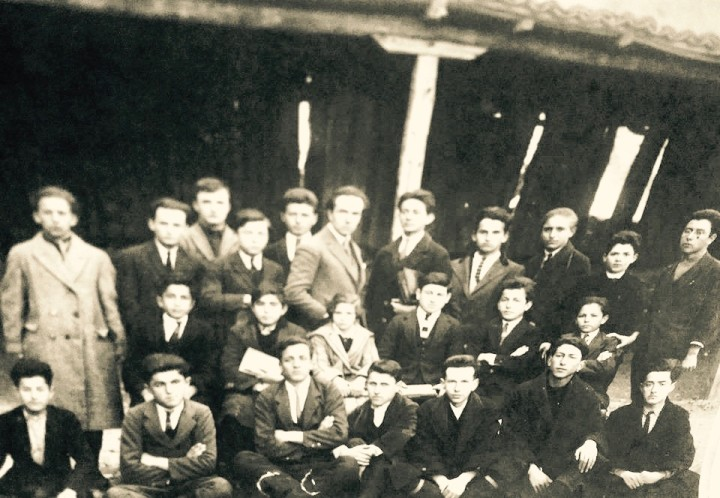
Sabiha Kasimati, in the center and the only woman in the photo

After settling in Korçë, she began her studies at the National Lyceum, also known as the French Lyceum, a name which had left from the time of the First World War where the French presence. language and its culture in the city were quite significant. One of her classmates was the future dictator Enver Hoxha. In 1930 she became the first woman to graduate from this school. She was fluent in several languages but especially French. Right after graduating from the Lyceum, she worked for some time as a teacher in the normal girls' school in the city, teaching the subjects of Moral Education and French Language. Later she transferred as a lecturer at the Albanian-American school in Kavajë, where she taught one of the passions of her life, Biology.

In 1936 she was able to fulfill her desire for higher studies. The Albanian state awarded her a scholarship to the University of Turin, at the Faculty of Biological Sciences, which she successfully completed with full and excellent grades. In the summer of 1941, she defended her doctorate, with the topic: "Fauna ittica di acqua dolce d'Albania" (English: Fish fauna of fresh water of Albania) and sometime after returned to Albania.

=== Career and scientific studies ===
Upon returning to her homeland, Kasimati was appointed a teacher at the Women's Institute "Nana Mbretëreshë", which after the Italian occupation was named "Donika Kastrioti". In parallel with her pedagogical work, she gave an important place in her life and in her scientific activity to the study of the biology of sea fish that live in lagoons, swamps, collecting materials for the preparation of the major work of the future, the monograph: "Fishes of Albania". For health reasons she was forced to leave her pedagogical work and be treated at the anti-tuberculosis sanatorium in northern Italy in Bolzano, where she remained until 1945.

After the end of the Second World War, Kasimati decided to return to her homeland in 1947, while the communists had just come to power in the country. With the establishment of the Institute of Studies, she is immediately appointed as a scientific specialist. A year later, when the institute is renamed the Institute of Scientific Studies, she is appointed zoologist specialist, profiled for ichthyology, in the section of biological sciences, with the head of the sector Dr. Sotir Angjeli. During this time Kasimati did the voluminous job of defining the scientific bibliography found in Albania at the time, especially with the confiscated library fund.

Kasimati managed to write a long programmatic article entitled "Problems of fish and fisheries in our country", published in the Bulletin of the Institute in No. 2-3 of 1948. In that long technical-scientific article, she treated analytically the ichthyological wealth of the country, according to the areas, the problems of breeding and necessary cultivation of some species, especially carp, koran, European bass, etc. Initially, in the article she presents the very suitable natural conditions that Albania has, both in rich river and marine ichthyofauna. She cites Italian authors and studies, who have mentioned ichthyological wealth and the economic possibilities of its exploitation. Further, she analyzed the natural factors suitable for this faunal wealth, ranging from configuration, large and protected bays, large swamps, water not too salty and that did not freeze even during the winter. Of particular importance she attributed to the currents of water, with were rich of planktons, rising from the Ionian Sea to the north of the Adriatic Sea. Another important condition Kasimati dealt with was the configuration of the submarine bed, the submarine platform, which is wide paved with fine sand or mud, where all kinds of aquatic plants, crustaceans and small mollusks, with which the fish feed, are found. According to the data of her study, in these areas are found mostly high-quality fish, such as Sturgeon, European bass, Twait shad, Orata, and Eel. The latter, according to Kasimati, travel over 300 km to the Maliqi swamp. She points out the experiments for successfully growing and cultivating carp in rice fields. In order to convince the public and economists it analyzes and offers some suggestions where the state can benefit from fisheries, including newly formed cooperatives. According to those data, the amount of fish reached 3238-4881 quintal, mostly in the Narta area, while in other areas with even greater potential, such as the Butrint area, due to the lack of modern fishing boats or other equipment, this figures did not exceed 7–8% of the Narta area, thus maintaining a very important economic reserve. A negative phenomenon that Kasimati had ascertained, was the indiscriminate, very intensive exploitation of fish with high commercial values and consequently, the impoverishment of ichthyofauna with these species. For modern fishing that allowed a sustainable economic perspective, according to her, more important are the equipment for the conservation of live fish, special facilities, as well as premises for the storage and processing of fish products.

In 1949, the Department of Natural Sciences carried out a long study expedition in the areas of Kukës, Bicaj, Pukë, Burrel, Qafë-Shtamë; Bogë, and Theth, thus realizing a verification of previous findings regarding the ichthyofauna of Albanian waters. At the end of this expedition, Kasimati managed to describe the representatives of families, orders, genera and species of all fish in Albania. After a scientific work in the middle of 1950, she submitted to the institute for publication the volume of about 200 pages, entitled "Fishes of Albania". This work summarized 257 species of fish, grouped in 211 families, of 99 orders, leaving without identifying ten species of fish, which usually come very rarely in the waters of the country, or which had not yet been encountered in the Adriatic Sea. But just when the book was in print, even in the final stages of release, Kasimati is arrested.

=== Criticism of the government, charges and execution ===
Kasimati had long opposed many of the policies of the post-war communist regime, especially after the elimination and internment of some Albanian intellectuals, who often had nothing to do with the political opponents of the PPSH. One such case that shocked her was the shooting of the scientist and professor Selaudin Toto, at the same time the director of the Institute of Scientific Studies where both of them had helped establish the institution. Or as it was the case of the opposition intellectual, and the first female Albanian writer, Musine Kokalari, who was convicted and imprisoned. All those sentences had pushed Kasimati to meet in person with Enver Hoxha, whom she had known since the time of the French Lyceum. For this meeting, some scholars quote Kasimat as saying: "I have come to tell you that you are killing all intellectuals. I want to ask you with whom you intend to build Albania, with the tinsmiths or the shoemakers?"; to which Hoxha replied: "Stop reading the French Enlightenment, I advise you to read Marx and Lenin."

On 19 February 1951, a small amount of dynamite (which was considered a bomb) was thrown in the yard of the Soviet Embassy in Tirana. Several dozen Albanians were arrested and after investigations, tortures of all kinds during 2–3 days, only 22 people were separated. Among them was Sabiha Kasimati, for whom the authorities never gave any explanation as to what connected her to this event. In fact, as was learned after the fall of communism, all the accused and executed were not given any kind of trial, no opportunity to defend themselves, and no appeal. On February 26, just one week after the incident, they were taken near the village of Mënik, on the banks of the Erzeni River and were shot.

Mehmet Shehu, then Minister of Internal Affairs, was personally involved in the brief investigation of Kasimati. On March 5, the then Minister of Justice, Manol Konomi, was fired for disagreeing with the violation of legality and the fabrication of a trial that had not previously taken place for those 22 people already killed.

== Legacy ==
Her work was published but not under her name. "Fishes of Albania" documented the fish of Albanian lakes, rivers and the seas and it was publicised under the name of the Russian scientist Anatoly Poliakov and two Albanian researchers in 1955.

Kasimati is credited with creating the idea of an Albania's National Museum of Science. In October 2018, it was announced that the Albanian National Museum of Science would be named for and that an area of the museum would be set aside for her life story and sacrifice.

== See also ==
- Sevasti Qiriazi
- Parashqevi Qiriazi
- Fatbardha Gega
- Urani Rumbo
- Ollga Plumbi
