= Women in Albania =

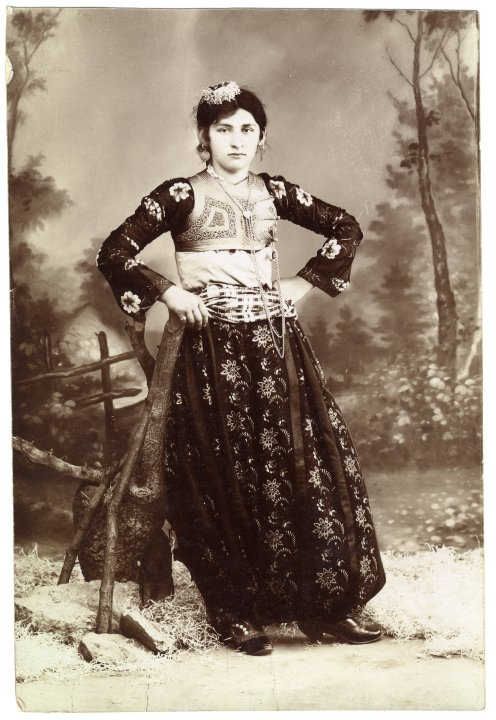
- Albanian woman (late 19th century/early 20th century)

General statistics
- Maternal mortality (per 100,000): 27 (2010)
- Women in parliament: 35.4% (2021)
- Women over 25 with secondary education: 81.8% (2012)
- Women in labour force: 52.0% (2014)

Gender Inequality Index
- Value: 0.144 (2021)
- Rank: 39th out of 191

Global Gender Gap Index
- Value: 0.763 (2025)
- Rank: 36th out of 148

The first women's association in Albania was founded in 1909. Albanian women from the northern Gheg region resided within a conservative and patriarchal society. In such a traditional society, the women had subordinate roles in Gheg communities that believe in "male predominance". This is despite the arrival of democracy and the adoption of a free market economy in Albania, after the period under the communist Party of Labour. Traditional Gheg Albanian culture was based on the 500-year-old Kanun of Lekë Dukagjini, a traditional Gheg code of conduct, where the main role of women was to take care of the children and to take care of the home.

== History ==
=== Rights to bear weapons ===
According to a column in The Literary World in 1878, Albanian women were allowed to carry weapons.

=== Traditional Gheg social status ===
Edith Durham noted in 1928 that Albanian village women were more conservative in maintaining traditions, such as revenge calling, similar to women in ancient Greece.

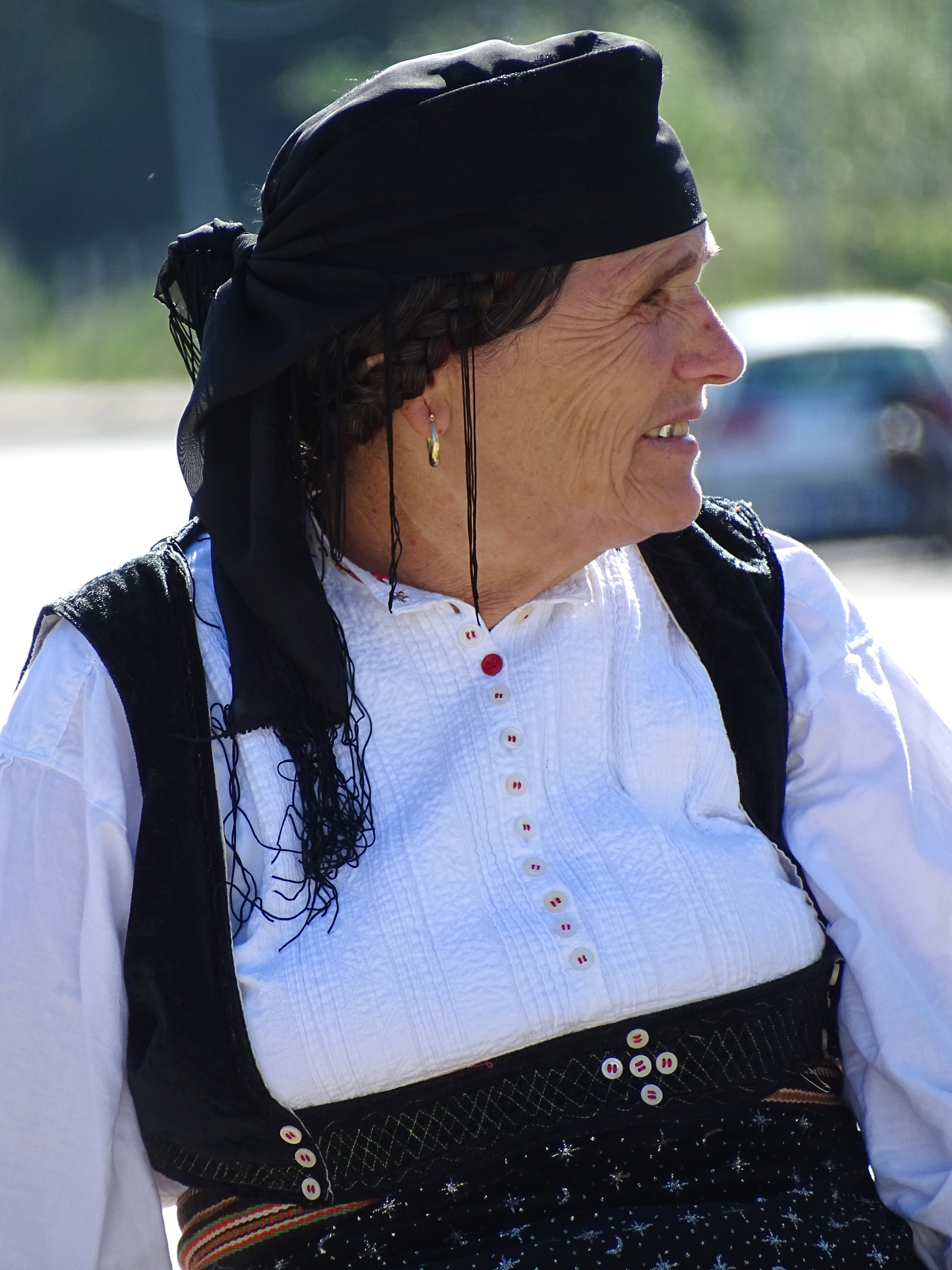
Elderly woman in traditional dress from Northern Albania

Prior to World War II, it was common for some Gheg Albanian women to become "live-in concubines" of men living in mountain areas.

Having daughters is less favoured within the patriarchal society of Gheg Albanians. Due to the giving of greater importance to the desire of having sons than bearing daughters, it is customary that for pregnant Albanian women to be greeted with the phrase "të lindtë një djalë", meaning "May it be a son".

=== Traditional Lab social status ===
The Labs of Labëria were a patriarchal society. As among the Montenegrins, women in Labëria were forced to do all the drudge work.

=== Gheg sworn virgins ===
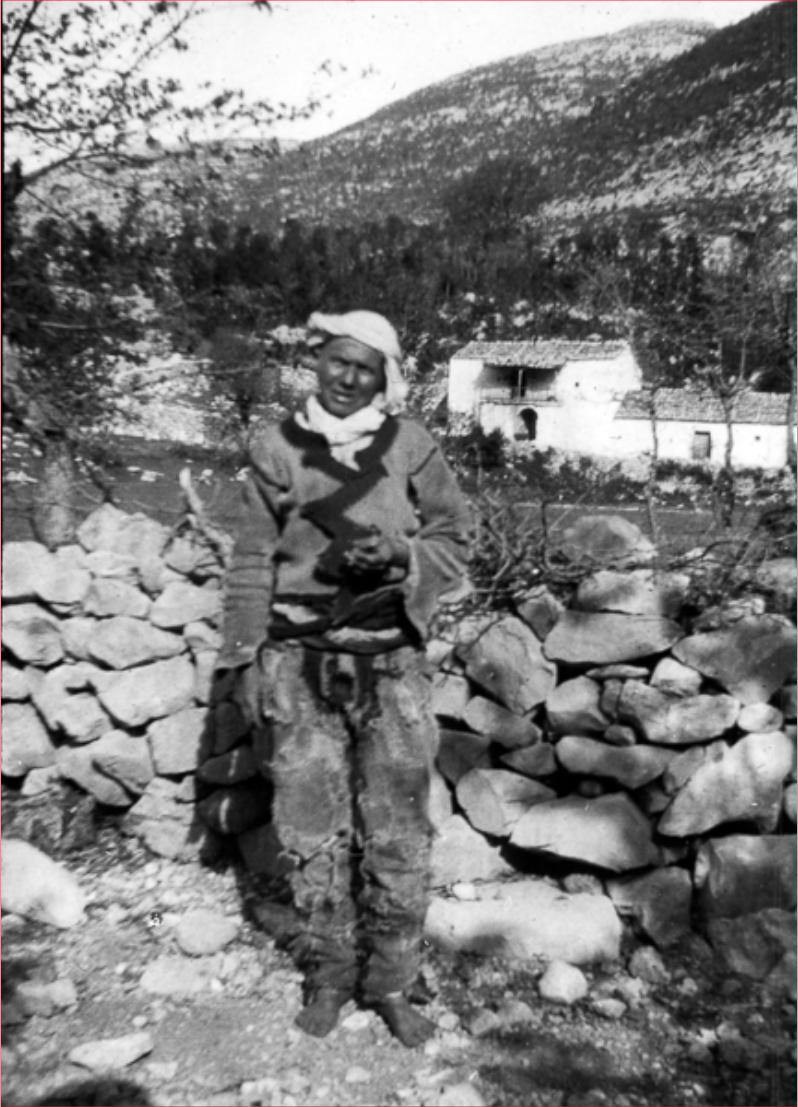
Sworn virgin in Rapsha, Hoti, Ottoman Albania at the beginning of the 20th century

In the past, in family units that did not have patriarchs, unmarried Albanian women could take on the role of the male head of the family by "taking an oath of virginity", a role that would include the right to live like a man, to carry weapons, own property, be able to move freely, dress like men, acquire male names if they wish to do so, assert autonomy, avoid arranged marriages, and be in the company of men while being treated like a man.

=== Meal preparation ===
The women in central Albania, particularly the women in Elbasan and the nearby regions, are known to cook the sweet tasting ballakume during the Dita e Verës, an annual spring festival celebrated on 14 March. On the other hand, Muslim Albanian women, particularly women from the Islamic Bektashi sect cook pudding known as the ashura from ingredients such as cracked wheat, sugar, dried fruit, crushed nuts, and cinnamon, after the 10th day of matem, a period of fasting.

== Women's rights in Albanian politics ==
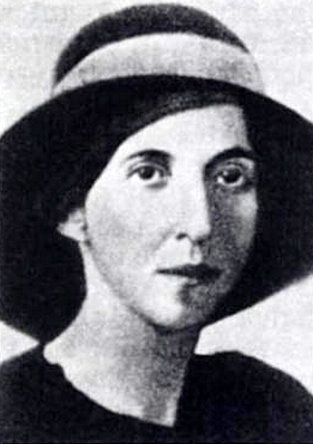
Urani Rumbo (1895-1936) was an Albanian feminist, teacher, and playwright, who promoted female education

In the 19th century, Sami Frashëri first voiced the idea of education for women with the argument that if would strengthen society by having educated women to teach their children. In the late 19th century, some urban elite women who had been educated in Western Europe saw a need for more education for women in Albania. In 1891, the first girls' high school was founded in Korçë by Sevasti Qiriazi and Parashqevi Qiriazi and in 1909 they founded the first women's organization in Albania, the Morning Star (Yll’i Mëngesit) with the purpose of raising the rights of women by raising their education level.

The women's movement in Albania was interrupted by the First World War, but resumed when Albania became an independent nation after the war. The Qiriazi sisters founded the organization Perlindja in Korçë, which published the newspaper Mbleta. In 1920, Marie Çoba founded the local women's organization Gruaja Shqiptare in Shkodër, which was followed by several other local organizations with the same name in Korçë, Vlorë and Tirana.

In 1920 Urani Rumbo and others founded Lidhja e Gruas (the Women's Union) in Gjirokastër, one of the most important feminist organisations promoting Albanian women's emancipation and right to study. They published a declaration in the newspaper Drita, protesting discrimination against women and social conditions. In 1923 Rumbo was also part of a campaign to allow girls to attend the "boy's" lyceum of Gjirokastër. The Albanian women's movement were supported by educated urban elite women who were inspired by the state feminism of Turkey under Kemal Ataturk.

During the reign of Zog I of Albania (r. 1928-1939), women's rights was protected by the state under the national state organization Gruaja Shiqiptare, which promoted a progressive policy and secured women the right to education and professional life and a ban against the seclusion of women in harems and behind veils; equal inheritance rights, divorce, and a ban against arranged and forced marriages as well as polygamy. However, in practice this progressive policy only concerned the cosmopolitan city elite, and had little effect in the lives of the majority of women in Albania.

Limited women's suffrage was granted in 1920, and women obtained full voting rights in 1945. Under the communist government of Albania, an official ideology of gender equality was promoted and promoted by Union of Albanian Women. In the first democratic election after the fall of communism, the number of women deputies in parliament fell from 75 in the last parliament of communist Albania to 9. In a turbulent period after 1991 the position of women worsened. There is a religious revival among Albanians which in the case of Muslims sometimes means that women are pushed back to the traditional role of mother and housekeeper. As of 2013 women represented 22.9% of the parliament.

== Marriage, fertility, and family life ==
The total fertility rate is 1.5 children born per woman (2015 est.), which is below the replacement rate of 2.1. The contraceptive prevalence rate is quite high: 69.3% (2008/09). Most Albanian women start their families in the early and mid-twenties: as of 2011, the average age at first marriage was 23.6 for women and 29.3 for men.

In some rural areas of Albania, marriages are still arranged, and society is strongly patriarchal and traditional, influenced by the traditional set of values of the kanun. The urbanization of Albania is low compared to other European countries: 57.4% of the total population (2015). Although forced marriage is generally disapproved by society, it is a "well known phenomenon in the country, especially in rural and remote areas," and girls and women in these areas are "very often forced into marriages because of [a] patriarchal mentality and poverty".

Abortion in Albania was fully legalized on December 7, 1995. Abortion can be performed on demand until the 12th week of pregnancy. Women must undergo counseling for a week prior to the procedure, and hospitals that perform abortions are not allowed to release information to the public regarding which women they have treated.

During the government of Enver Hoxha, communist Albania had a natalist policy, leading women to have illegal abortions or to induce them on their own. Eventually the country had the second-highest maternal mortality rate in all of Europe, and it was estimated that 50% of all pregnancies ended in an abortion.

== Employment ==
During the communist era women entered in paid employment in large numbers. The transition period in Albania has been marked by rapid economic changes and instability. The labour market faces many of the problems that are common to most transition economies, such as loss of jobs in many sectors, that were not sufficiently compensated by emerging new sectors. As of 2011, the employment rate was 51.8% for young women, compared to 65.6% for young men.

== Education ==
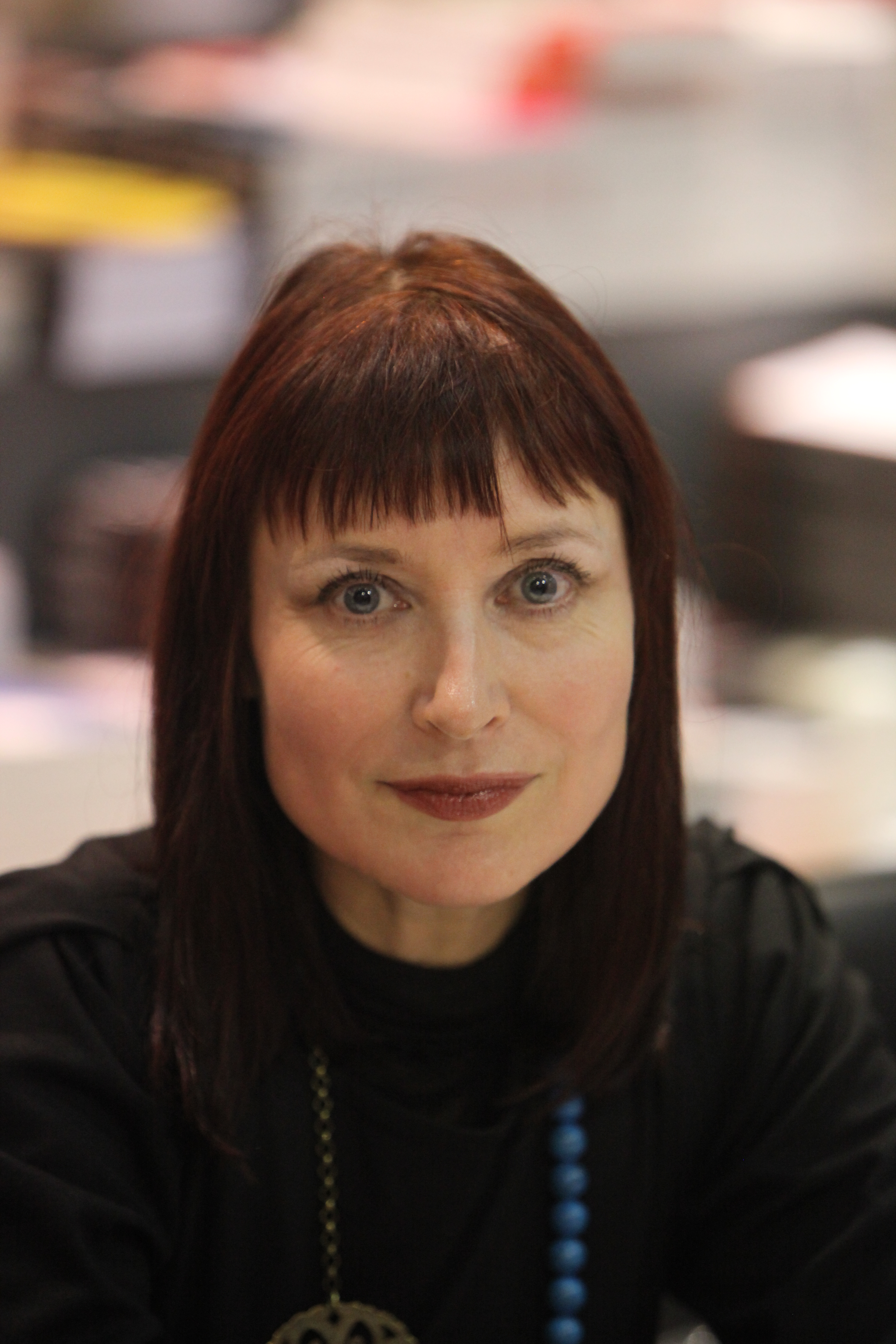
Bessa Myftiu, Albanian professor, novelist and journalist

As late as 1946, about 85% of the people were illiterate, principally because schools using the Albanian language had been practically non-existent in the country before it became independent in 1912. Until the mid-nineteenth century, the Ottoman rulers had prohibited the use of the Albanian language in schools. The communist regime gave high priority to education, which included the alphabetization of the population, but also the promotion of socialist ideology in schools. As of 2015, the literacy rate of women was only slightly below that of men: 96.9% female compared to 98.4% male.

== Violence against women ==
In recent years, Albania has taken steps to address the issue of violence against women. This included enacting the Law No. 9669/2006 (Law on Measures against Violence in Family Relations) and ratifying the Istanbul Convention.

== See also ==
- Union of Albanian Women
- Gender roles in post-communist Central and Eastern Europe
- Women in Europe
