= Menik =

Menik may refer to:

- Měník, Czechia
- Mënik, Albanian
- Ménik language
- Menik Kurukulasuriya (born 1957), Sri Lankan actress
