= The Walls Came Tumbling Down =

The Walls Came Tumbling Down may refer to:

- The Walls Came Tumbling Down (film), a 1946 American film directed by Lothar Mendes
- The Walls Came Tumbling Down (Wilson book), a 1997 film script by Robert Anton Wilson
- The Walls Came Tumbling Down: The Collapse of Communism in Eastern Europe, a book by Gale Stokes
- The Walls Came Tumbling Down (memoir), a 1957 memoir by Henriette Roosenburg
- The Walls Came Tumbling Down, a 1943 novel by Jo Eisinger

== See also ==
- And the Walls Came Tumbling Down, 1989 autobiography by American civil rights leader Ralph David Abernathy
- "Joshua Fit the Battle of Jericho", an African-American spiritual featuring the lyrics "the walls came tumbling down"
- Tumbling Down (disambiguation)
