= Natural Sciences Museum Sabiha Kasimati =

Museum in Tirana, Albania

Natural Sciences Museum "Sabiha Kasimati"
- Muzeu i Shkencave të Natyrës "Sabiha Kasimati"
- Established: 1948; 78 years ago
- Location: Rr. Petro Nini Luarasi 76, 1010 Tirana, Albania
- Coordinates: 41°19′32.0″N 19°50′04.5″E
- Website: Official website

Natural Sciences Museum "Sabiha Kasimati" (Albanian: Muzeu i Shkencave të Natyrës "Sabiha Kasimati") is a natural science museum in Tirana, Albania.

== History ==
Established in 1948, the museum is affiliated with the University of Tirana and has branches in zoology, botany and geology.

On 8 March 2018, the museum was named after Sabiha Kasimati, first Albanian scientist to make major contributions to the study of freshwater fish. Kasimati was killed in February 1951 by the Communist regime, accused of being part of a group of 22 Albanian intellectuals who had detonated a bomb in the Russian embassy in Tirana. In 1991, all victims were rehabilitated by the new government and awarded posthumously by the Order of Honour of the State.

== Collections ==
The museum is composed of seven pavilions that collect 3,000 items related to the rich Albanian biodiversity, including animals (mammals, birds, reptiles, amphibians, fish, insects and aquatic invertebrates) and plants. Invertebrates represent the largest number of faunal specimens exhibited in the museum and kept in the scientific storage area. The rich collection of the Museumis due to its talented researchers such as Sabiha Kasimati, Ilia Mitrushi, Vasil Puzanov, Fotaq Lamani, Kastriot Misja, Idriz Haxhiu, Vangjel Andoni, Lekë Gjiknu ri, Islam Zeko, Andrian Vaso, Ferdinand Bego, Taulant Bino, Sajmir Beqiraj, etc. In addition, museum curators and taxidermists such as Muhamet Shpati and Grigor Jorgo contributed to collection preservation.

== See also ==
- Sabiha Kasimati
- Science and technology in Albania
- University of Tirana
- Tourism in Albania
