= Fairs in Pristina =

Fairs in the capital city of Kosovo

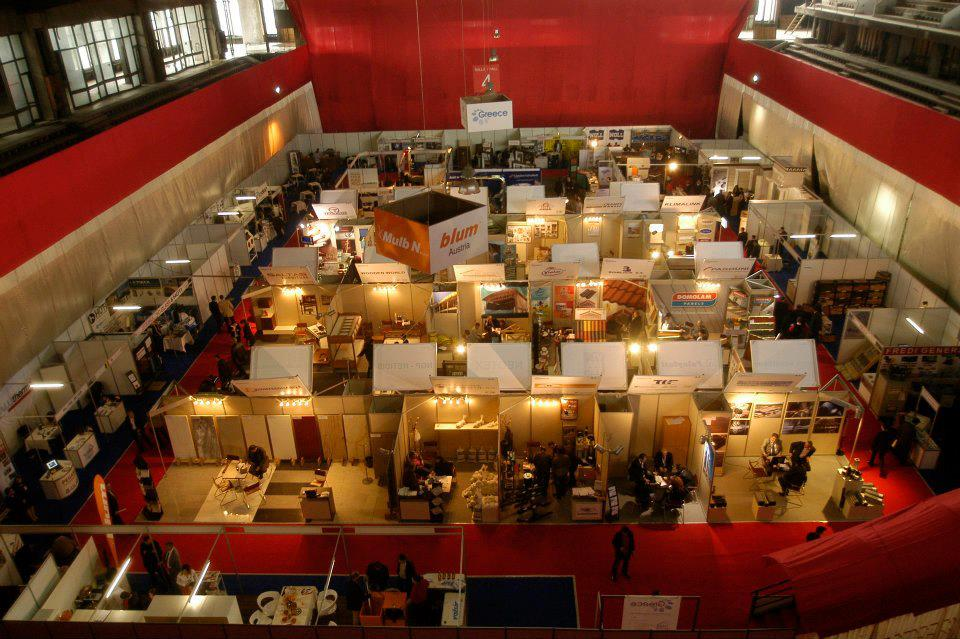
Expokos Fair being held in Pristina

Fairs in Pristina started since the medieval period, at the time when it was famous for its annual trade fairs and its goat hide and goat hair articles. Pristina always had a development in trading due to its position in the Balkan trade routes. Despite that fact, Pristina, or Kosovo in general, is not known for occurrence of fairs. With the development of culture and especially after the last war in 1999, Pristina has had progress on holding these kinds of events.

Every year, various types of trade fairs take place in the capital city. The essence of these fairs is usually temporary; some last only an afternoon while others may last around 3 days, a week or even longer. They have grown in size and importance over the years. These fairs are organized annually and are open to trade visitors and public. The number of exhibitors and visitors is usually very high.

== Fairs ==
Nr	Fair	Date	Venue
1	EXPOKOS-Construction, Technology, Energetic and Furniture Fair	14May – 17May	Pallati i Rinise
2	Education Fair, Career and Competence	28May – 30May	Pallati i Rinise
3	Travel and Tourism Fair	28May – 30May	Pallati i Rinise
4	AGROKOS (Agrobusiness, Food and Drink Fair)	08Oct – 11Oct	Pallati i Rinise
5	Home & Gift Exhibition	08Oct – 11Oct	Pallati i Rinise
6	MEDIKOS (Medical, Dental and Pharmaceutical Fair)	22Oct – 24Oct	Pallati i Rinise
7	ITTF (Information Technology Trade Fair)	22Oct – 24Oct	Pallati i Rinise
8	Citizen Information Fair	28May – 30May	Pallati i Rinise
9	Ditet e Diaspores/Days of Diaspora	27Jul – 29Jul	Mother Teresa Square
10	Book Fair	03Jun – 08Jun	Pallati i Rinise
11	The International General Fair	30Apr – 03May	Pristina–Mitrovica highway

=== EXPOKOS-Construction, Technology, Energetic and Furniture Fair ===
The Construction, Technology, Energetic and Furniture Fair was first held in 2001. The annual trade show is open on 14–17 May at "Pallati i Rinisë". It is attended by visitors from 13 countries and overall specialists in the field of construction, energetics, technology, furniture and real estate, employers, distributors, managers of public and private companies, institution leaders, students.

This fair is divided into four sectors:

1. Construction
2. Timber industry
3. Measure technology
4. Energy

In 2013, over 338 exhibitors and 25150 visitors took part to inform themselves on innovations and trends in their business. There were also participants from 14 countries, national pavilions from Greece, Italy, Croatia, Czech Republic and exhibitors from the field of construction, technology, energetic, furniture, real estate. The event is in charge of EXPOKOS and is organized by CEO (Congress & Event Organization).

=== Education Fair, Career and Competence ===
The Education Fair is held annually since 2004, at the venue "Pallati i Rinise" during 28-30 of May. Included are public and non public universities, vocational and professional education institutes, e-learning and distance learning specialists, education publishers and media education, NGOs, international education councils, career training courses providers, IT training providers, local and international schools, insurance companies, and banks.

The Education Fair is the only event of its kind, where all educational institutions participate, starting from the pre-school education up to the post-university. It is supported by CEO (Congress & Event Organization). The fair is open to public.

==== Kosovo Education Fair in Pristina ====
Another educational fair is Kosovo Education Fair in Pristina. It starts from 17 to 19 April at "Pallati i Rinise". The Education Fair has been organized seven times until now. It was attended by a considerable number of educational institutions; universities, colleges and schools from Kosovo, Albania and Macedonia. All educational institutions are participants, starting from the pre-school education up to the post-university. The 2012 Kosovo Education Fair received more than 23,800 visitors and 61 exhibitors from nine countries.

=== Travel Fair, Travel and Tourism Fair ===
The year of the trade show's foundation is 2004. It is held year after year at "Pallati i Rinise" from 28 to 30 May and is open to trade visitors and public. The Travel and Tourism Fair is organized by CEO - Congress & Event Organization.

There is participation from tourism information offices, tourism agencies, tourism associations, ministries, municipalities, travel organizers, hotels and gastronomy, equipment for hotels and restaurants, tourism resources, skiing equipment, ski lifts, sport equipment and outfits, outdoor sports, IT and software services for travel arrangements, fitness, fashion, cosmetics etc.

=== AGROKOS (Agrobusiness, Food and Drink Fair) ===
Pallati i Rinisë is the venue where AGROKOS is annually held, from 08 to 11 October, open to the public. AGROKOS was found in 2000. The trade show organizer responsible for organisation and management of AGROKOS is CEO (Congress & Event Organization). The fair lies on the following business sectors: Agriculture, Food, Beverages. It contains food, production of milk, meat, seafood, fruits and vegetables, confectionery products, spices, products of agriculture and farming, light and heavy machinery for agriculture equipment and technology.

=== Home & Gift Exhibition ===
The most recent fair is Home & Gift Exhibition, which was found in 2013. It was held at "Pallati i Rinise" on 08–11 October. Its aim is to become an annual fair. The emphasis of Home & Gift lies on the following business sectors: Gifts, Souvenirs, Ideal Home. The responsible organizer of Home & Gift Exhibition is CEO - Congress & Event Organization.

=== MEDIKOS (Medical, Dental and Pharmaceutical Trade Fair) ===
Medikos was first shown in 2000, and now it is an every year tradition held from 22 to 24 October. The main exhibit sectors of MEDIKOS are: Physiotherapy technology and orthopedics, electro medical equipment and technology, diagnostic equipment, dental orthodontics and prosthetics, medical associations, facility management, medical furniture, medical clothes, mobile equipment for surgeries, commodities and consumer goods for surgeries and hospital, laboratory technology and equipment, pharmaceutics and drugs, dental medicine. Medikos is open to traders and public. In 2012 61 exhibitors presented their company and products on MEDIKOS and over 12150 visitors, who came to discover the latest trends and innovations of their industry. It is supported by CEO - Congress & Event Organization.

=== ITTF (Information Technology Trade Fair) ===
First held in 2004, the Information Technology Trade Fair became an annual event which started from 22 to 24 October at "Pallati i Rinise". The main exhibit sectors of the trade show ITTF are: Personal computing and software, Internet services, IT services, security systems, telecommunication, SNC satellite, networks and cable, sound and car media, digital photography, photo and music training, printing house, design studios, film production. In 2012, 56 exhibitors presented innovations and trends at the trade show and over 12150 visitors seized ITTF as an information platform. CEO - Congress & Event Organization is responsible for this fair.

=== Citizen Information Fair ===
The fair took place for the first time in Pallati i Rinise on April 17–19, 2013. The second edition is going to take place from 28 to 30 May. The purpose of this fair is to contribute on raising the awareness of the existence of various organization within the country, promote and expand their work, increase directly the communication between citizens and organizations, presentations from government institutions and civil society and promotional activities. It aims to be an annual fair and is organized by CEO - Congress & Event Organization.

=== Ditet e diaspores ===
During the traditional festival called "Ditet e Diaspores" took place one of the most important fairs which included domestic products. Most of all there were women who participated in addition to promote their homemade products. There were displayed craft products, dairy products, honey etc., to show their ability in making business and leadership. This is one of many work of the tireless Albanian women. Ministry of Diaspora estimated that these days through these fairs there has been an increase of the cooperation between local business and Diaspora. It is also helpful of raising the awareness about the consumption of domestic production and promote as much economic development.

==== Vullneti i Grave ====
"Vullneti i Grave" participated in a fair organized by the Ministry of Diaspora in June and in the five-day 'Handicrafts and Cultural Heritage Fair 2013' organized by the NGO 'Open Door' which is held every year in September in Pristina. With every fair, the women honed their skills in talking to customers and in displaying their products. Using that knowledge, Vullneti i Grave even organized their own fair with the support of DRC's implementing partner, NGO Lulebora.

The Vullneti i Grave fair brought together five NGO's and women's groups from Mitrovicë and Fushë Kosova, giving them the opportunity to exhibit and sell their products on Mother Teresa Square in Pristina. During July 27, 28 and 29, Ministry of Diaspora has organized a fair of the local products including food, crafts, souvenirs, jewellery and flowers. Twelve members of the Gratë në Biznes have successfully attended this fair. Sale of the products started early in the morning and lasted until the late night hours. Customers were very satisfied with the offered products. Some of them have required that Pristina should organize weekly market / fair where women can sell their unique and special products.

=== Book Fair ===
One of the most successful ways for books to be closer with the readers is the traditional organization of Pristina's book fair and the participation of Kosovo's publishers with common stand at the fair on the world renowned - Frankfurt. So far there have been organized 15 fairs, every year. The next 16th traditional fair will be held on 03–8 June. The first book fair took place on 17 to 22 November 1999 but others were organized during May and June. The number of participants is about 100 publishers, mostly from Kosovo, Albania, Macedonia, Diaspora.

=== The International General Fair ===
The International General Fair "Pristina" is held annually in Pristina, and is now a traditional event. It is supported by Kosova Chamber of Commerce, in cooperation with the Government of Kosovo. It occurs every year in different dates and locations. At this event not only Kosovar companies attend, but also companies from the region and other countries.

The fair in 2012 was held between 6–9 June. The fair was held on the premises of Ministry of Agriculture, Forestry and Rural Development- Industrial Zone in Pristina. The 2013 Feneral fair started on 08–11 May. About 120 companies from Kosovo region and Europe participated there. The International General Fair "Pristina 2014" will be taking place between 30 of April – 03 of May 2014. The fair will be organized on the premises located in village of Bernice, Prishtina–Mitrovica highway.
