= Arba Kokalari =

Swedish politician

Arba Kokalari MEP
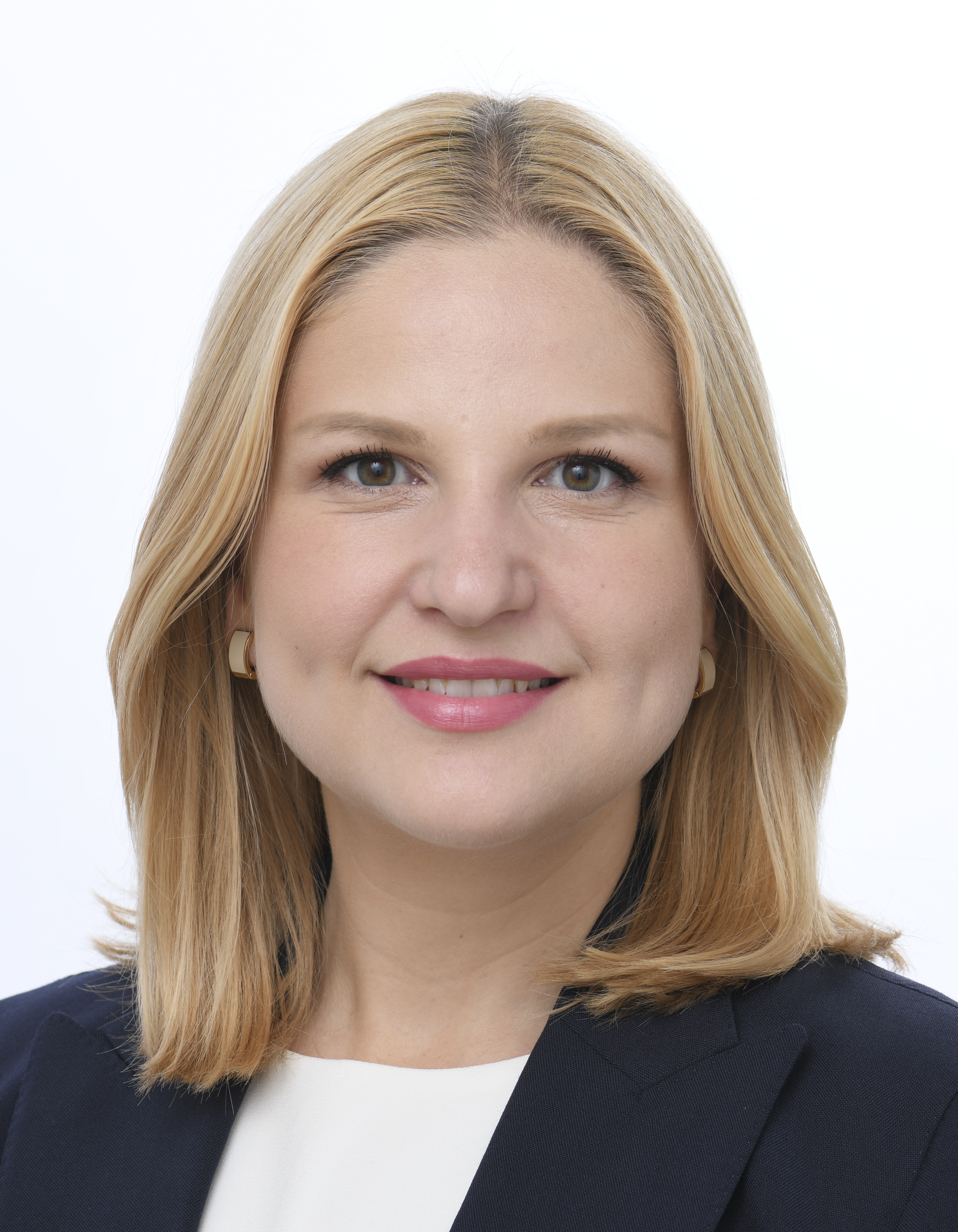

Member of the European Parliament
- Incumbent
- Assumed office 2 July 2019
- Constituency: Sweden

Personal details
- Born: Arba Kokalari; 27 November 1986 (age 39) Tirana, Albania
- Party: Moderate Party; European People's Party
- Relatives: Musine Kokalari (great-aunt)
- Education: Stockholm University

Arba Kokalari (born 27 November 1986) is an Albanian-born Swedish politician of the Moderate Party who has been serving as a Member of the European Parliament since the 2019 European Parliament election in Sweden.

In parliament Kokalari serves on the Committee on the Internal Market and Consumer Protection and the Committee on Women's Rights and Gender Equality. Since 2021 she has been her parliamentary group's shadow rapporteur on the Digital Services Act (DSA).

In addition to her committee assignments, Kokalari is a member of the delegation for relations with the United States and the European Parliament Intergroup on LGBT Rights.
