= Gender roles in post-communist Central and Eastern Europe =

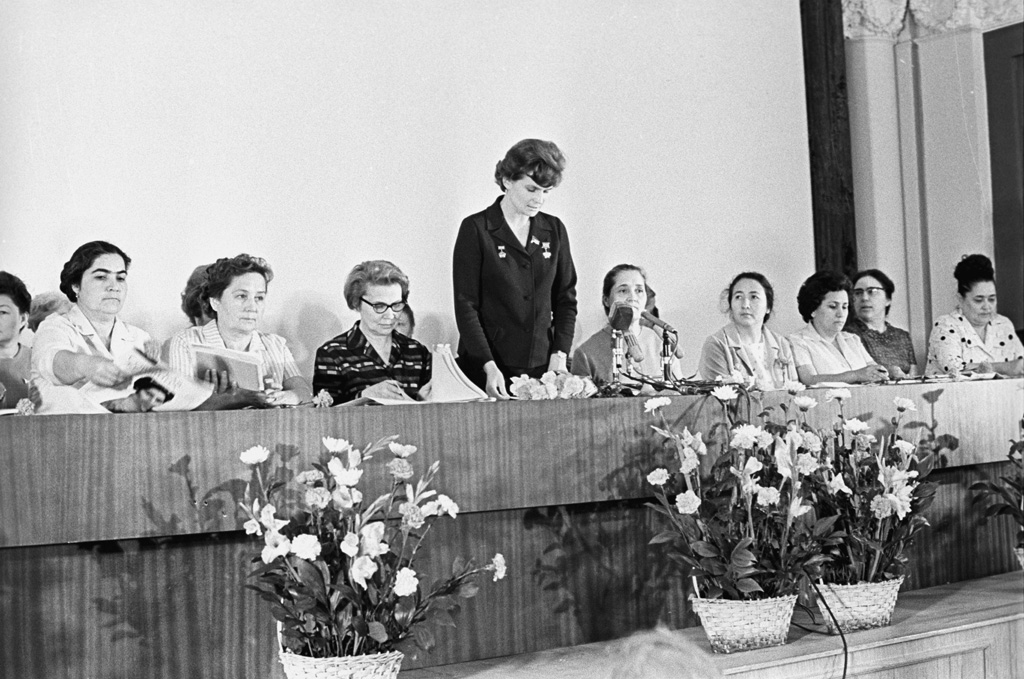
A plenary meeting of the Soviet Women's Committee in 1968

Changes in gender roles in Central and Eastern Europe after the fall of Communism have been an object of historical and sociological study.

== Historical context ==
The Eastern European state socialist regimes proclaimed women's emancipation in the late 1940s. Legislation was passed that radically altered women's position in societies of Eastern Europe. New laws guaranteed women's equality in society and marriage, and women as well as men were required to become productive members of society by working for wages and engaging in political activism. Women's participation in the workforce continued to increase through the period, with some countries seeing 50% of the workforce being made up of women by the end of the communist period. In most countries the right to abortion was codified into law by the end of the 1950s.

Political leaders viewed women's presence in the workforce as providing an opportunity to instill communist ideology in new generations of women.

Though such advancements were made, Soviet and Warsaw-pact governments generally framed feminism a "bourgeois ideology".

== Changes in post-communist states ==
The dissolution of the Soviet system was followed by a rapid increase in poverty, crime, corruption, unemployment, homelessness, rates of disease, infant mortality, domestic violence and income inequality, along with decreases in calorie intake, life expectancy, adult literacy and income. Many people in post-Soviet states felt that their lives were worse off after 1989, when capitalist markets were made dominant.

=== Government ===
With the transition from socialism to neo-liberal market economies and democracies, many states saw a dramatic drop in the number of women represented in state legislatures. Such an example can be seen in the parliament of Albania where the number of women representatives fell from 73 to 9 in the first post-collapse elections. The transition also saw a reduction in women's participation in the new political systems. These factors have made it difficult for women to advocate for women's rights in central and eastern Europe after the transition.

=== Employment ===
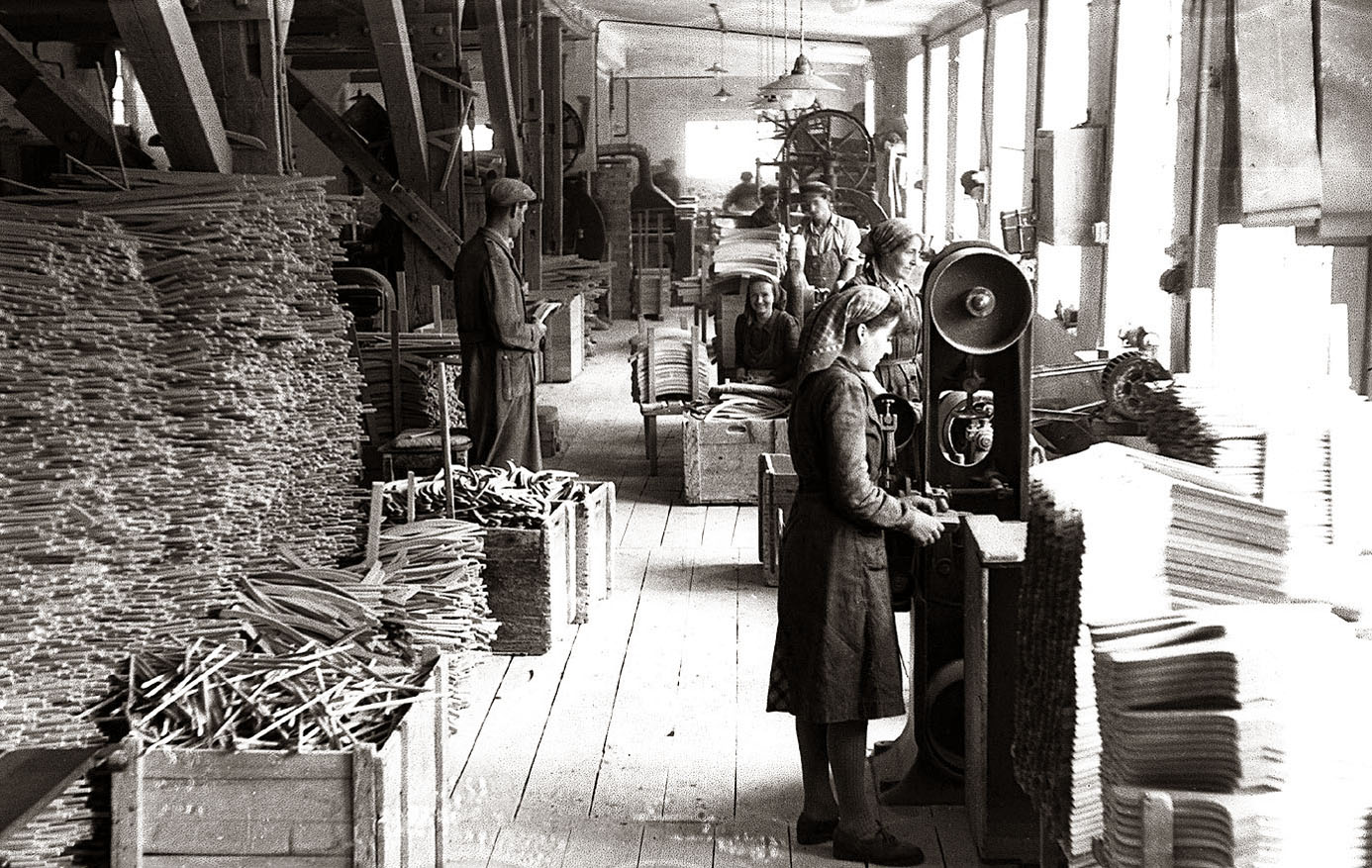
Women working in a furniture factory in Rimske Toplice, People's Republic of Slovenia, 1955

The transition from socialism to neo-liberal market economies saw an over-representation of women in unemployment that had not existed before in the central and eastern European countries. Though there was variation in this change depending on the country. In the former Soviet Union this transition led to significant changes in all spheres including the labor market. Whilst there was a gender pay gap in places such as the Soviet Union, due to protective legislation that restricted women's employment in jobs that were considered dangerous or physically demanding which meant that due to the fact that in the centralised wage system, where market forces did not interfere, earnings within sectors were determined by the perception of a certain sector's productivity, laboriousness and social usefulness, women in Russia were highly concentrated in white-collar sectors such as education, healthcare, trade, food and light industry, their earnings were on average lower than those of men throughout the whole of the Soviet Union's history, a similar concentration of women in the workforce and a similar trend were also seen in the German Democratic Republic. After the collapse, due to laws such as the Law on the State Enterprise (adopted prior to transition in 1987), meant that goods-producing enterprises had to meet their wage payment obligations from their own revenue. While this change scarcely affected women, as women were still concentrated in the "nonproductive" sector, it did affect the pay gap between women and men. The nonproductive sector, encompassing such sectors as education and healthcare, was still financed from the state budget and was therefore at greater risk of budgetary cuts, which occurred in the transitory period. Women continued to have lower wages than men after the collapse, with increases in the wage gap in most countries, this occurred alongside an increase in the overall income inequality. In this transitory period for many states there was economic disaster, and Gale Stokes comments on how "many of the customary practices of ordinary life, such as the value of time, gender relations, the nature of public discourse, and the job environment, changed." Due to women being concentrated in the lower tier of the income distribution, they were more vulnerable to such changes, and the rising social inequality had an adverse effect on the gender pay differentials during the transition years. Rita Hansberry, Christopher Gerry, Byung-Yeon Kim and Carmen Li provide evidence that the increase in dispersion of incomes brought about by liberalisation had a negative impact on the gender wage gap in Russia.

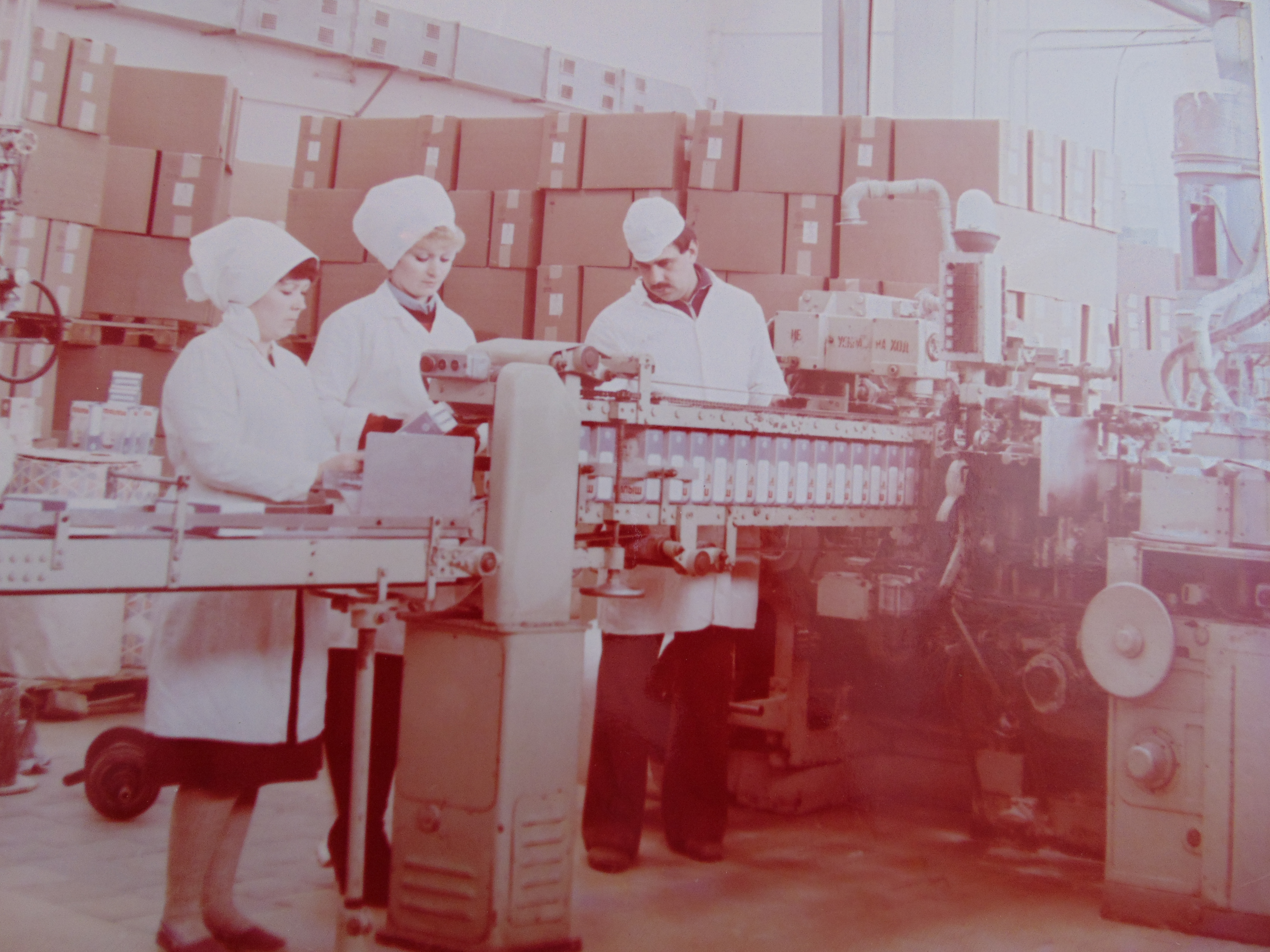
Women working in a milk production plant in Ukraine, 1976

Beyond income equality, the transition increased the gender discrimination in workplaces. Many women left professional and managerial positions that women had occupied previously due to the ongoing removal of state childcare services in central and eastern European countries. Due to family considerations, it was predicted in 1993 that many women would leave the work force and consolidate in occasional, short-term, seasonal, undeclared, and other kinds of precarious work, and this has been shown to have been the case in later research.

Éva Fodor and Anikó Balogh, contrary to other researchers, based on pre-collapse and post-collapse survey data, have said that opinions on women as homemakers and their contribution to the workforce, have changed little in central and eastern European states, and in contrast western European states have greatly liberalised their views on women within the home and workforce.

The transition also saw a shift in most economies from heavy industry to light industry, this saw many men made redundant from jobs within heavy industry moving into light industry which had been a highly feminised sector of the economy during the communist period.

=== Reproductive rights and sexual violence ===
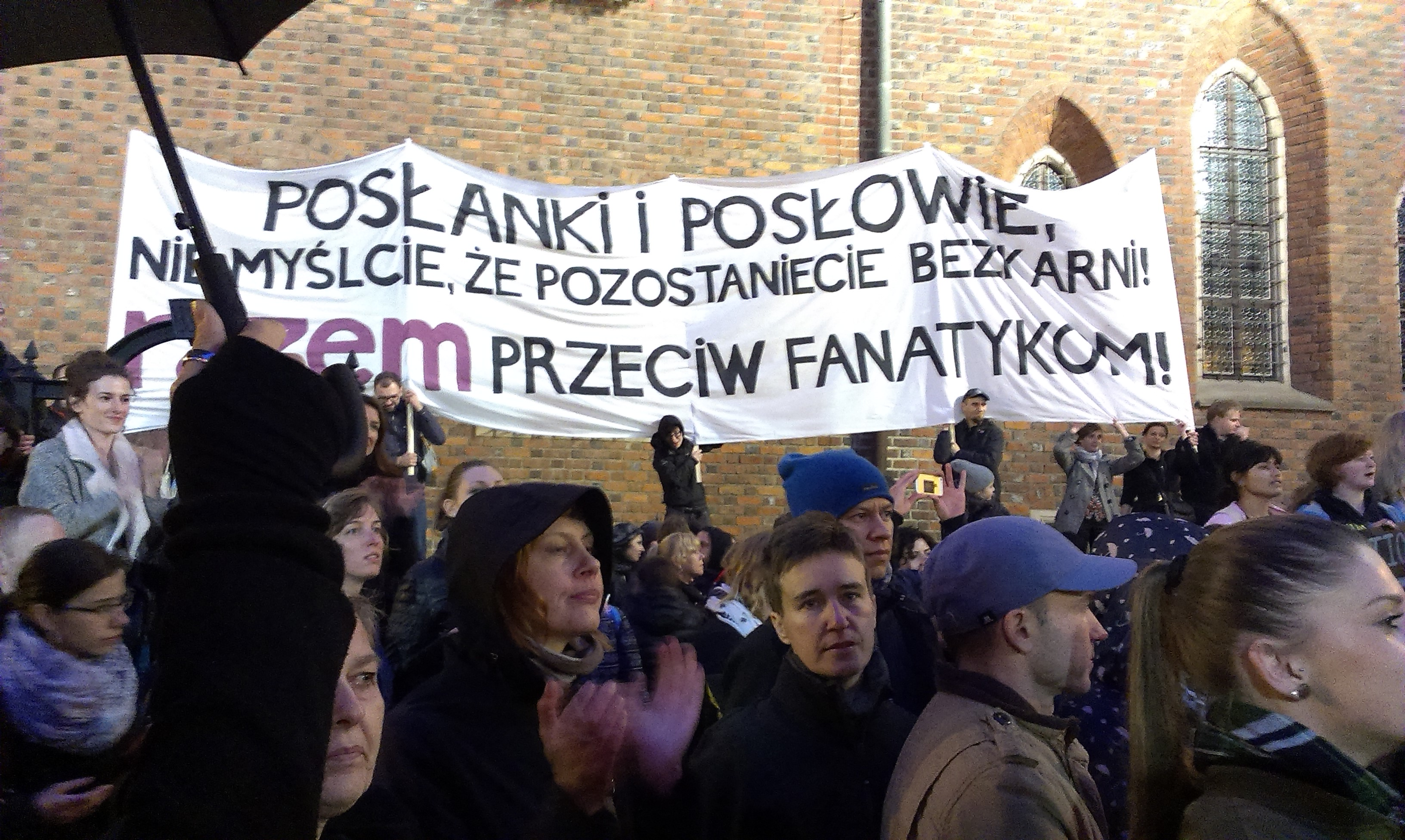
Black Monday protest for reproductive rights in Wrocław, 3 October 2016 as part of the Ogólnopolski Strajk Kobiet

Some rights, such as reproductive rights which had been achieved under the previous socialist regimes were subsequently challenged in countries after the fall of those regimes. The restriction of access to abortion in the years immediately after the collapse saw mass protests from women in Czechoslovakia and Poland, with the number of legal abortions conducted per year in Poland dropping by over 30,000 from 1991 to 1993.

In Russia, pornography proliferated after the collapse, whilst in the former Yugoslavia an epidemic of mass rape occurred. Slavenka Drakulić described the liberalisation of the economy and society in Yugoslavia as:

We live surrounded by newly opened porno shops, porno magazines, peepshows, stripteases, unemployment and galloping poverty [...] Romanian women are prostituting themselves for a single dollar in towns on the Romanian-Yugoslav border. In the midst of all this, our anti-choice nationalist governments are threatening our right to abortion and telling us to multiply, to give birth to more Poles, Hungarians, Czechs, Croats, Slovaks.

— How We Survived Communism and Even Laughed (1993)

With the negative economic situations many women found themselves in during the market liberalisation of the economies, human traffickers became prominent in trafficking women around central and eastern Europe, and to western Europe from central and eastern Europe for prostitution.

=== Health ===
The transition led to a reduction in the life expectancy of people across society in many countries, though to a lesser extent for women.

== The example of Bulgaria ==
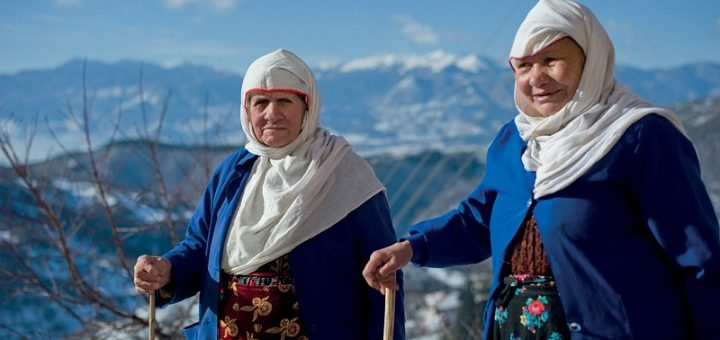
Elderly Pomak women in Bulgaria

=== Economic participation ===
Kristen Ghodsee comments how whilst many suggest that all women in Bulgaria were negatively affected by the collapse, some groups of women did relatively well after the collapse, specifically those in the tourism industry, who had higher levels of general education, work experience with Westerners and knew Western foreign-languages. Vesna Nikolić-Ristanović points out how at the same time women made up two thirds of the unpaid workers present in Bulgaria during the transition. Mariya Stoilova found that women's economic activity in post-socialist Bulgaria was most affected by the age of the women, with older women who were in employment during the socialist system having the lowest rate of economic activity in post-socialist Bulgaria, and while younger women still faced sexist discrimination in employment opportunities, they were more economically active than older age groups of women.

=== Religious reaction ===
Following the collapse, the Pomaks of Bulgaria saw a resurgence in orthodox forms of Islam and Christianity, as many believed their "traditions were corrupted by communism", with similar sentiments seen in other groups. This encouraged a return to traditional gender roles for men and women. Ghodsee comments on how for some men this included more strictly policing their wives' bodies than they had previously under the communist regime, and how also many women "seemed eager" to adopt such traditional gender roles. With the lack of autonomous feminist movements during the socialist period of Bulgaria, women's rights in the post-communist country has not had a great grassroots base, and is instead conducted mainly through professional NGOs.

=== Violence against women ===
Psychotherapists reported that reports of domestic violence increased in Bulgaria during the transitionary period, attributing this increase to the serious economic problems many families and households faced.

== Controversies ==
There is controversy with regard to the view, which is often promoted in western Europe, according to which the fall of communism had a disproportionate negative effect on women in those countries, and there is criticism of stereotypical views presented in the media about the status of women from this region both during and after the fall of the communism. Such views are often accused of being rooted in the common idea that western cultures are better and must save "less developed" societies. This is linked to objections in painting feminism in eastern Europe as "a matter of catching up with the West."

With regard to central and eastern European countries, the fall of communism had severely affected the whole society (including through violent wars such as Yugoslav Wars and post-Soviet conflicts), and in some cases, such as the fall of the heavy industry, men were worse affected. With regard to social policies, these have varied greatly by country, both during and after the fall of communism, given that former communist countries are not a monolith and there were and are differences between them (half of European countries are former communist countries). For example, while in Poland abortion was restricted in the 1990s, in other countries the fall of communism actually led to the liberalisation of reproductive rights, such as in Albania, especially during the later stages of the communist period, which saw aggressive natalist policies.

Critics argue that the claims made by the former communist regimes regarding the official data about the situation of women under those communist governments should not be taken for granted, as while there were laws that supported gender equality in the Soviet Union, like many other laws in the Soviet Union, they were not well enforced and sometimes neglected.

== See also ==
- Women in Albania
- Marxist feminism
- Feminism in Russia
- Women in the Russian Revolution
- The Walls Came Tumbling Down: The Collapse of Communism in Eastern Europe
