= Drita (magazine) =

Albanian magazine

Gazeta Drita
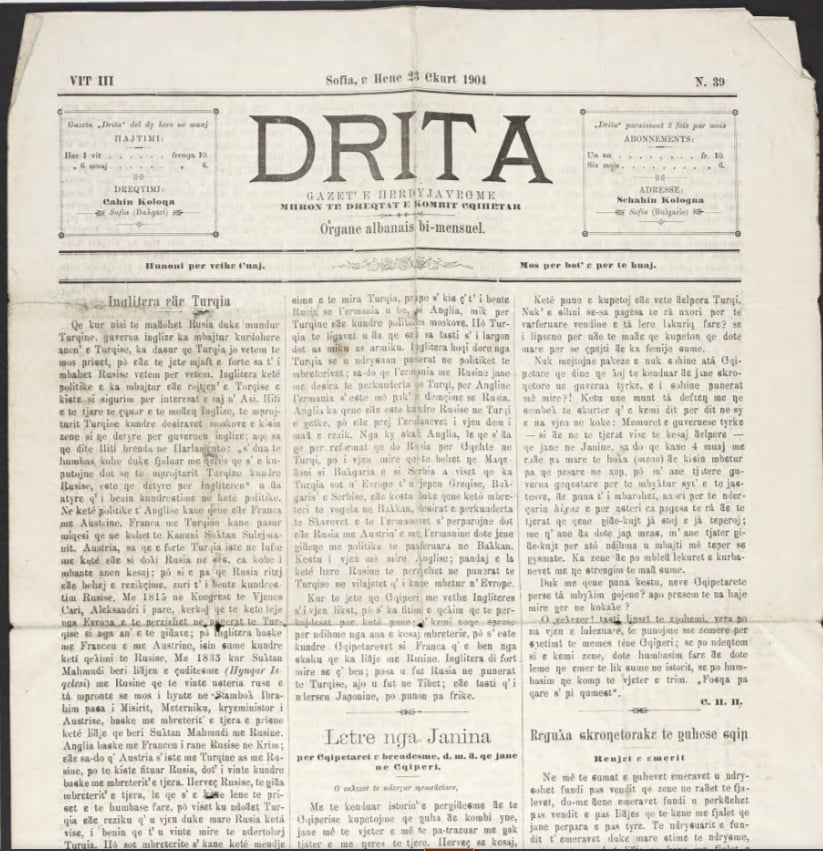
- Editor: Granit Zela
- Categories: Literature
- Frequency: Weekly (Sunday)
- Publisher: The current publisher is the Association of the Young Modern Artists of Albania; prior publishers included Petro Poga, Shahin Kolonja, and the Albanian League of Writers and Artists
- First issue: 14 January 1883
- Country: Albania
- Language: Albanian
- Website: www.artistet.org/drita

Drita (Drita meaning "the light" in English) is an Albanian literary magazine published by the Association of the Young Modern Artists of Albania (Albanian: Shoqëria e Artistëve të Rinj Modernë). Drita was one of the first magazines in the Albanian language. It has been published for 127 years with some interruptions.

== History: 1883–1922 ==
Drita was one of the first newspapers published in Albanian. It was initially printed in Istanbul, Turkey (then Ottoman Empire) in 1883 for the first time. The Central Committee for Defending Albanian Rights, the Society for the Publication of Albanian Writings and their president, Sami Frashëri, were the main contributors of the magazine, however their identity was secret at that time. The magazine's publisher was Petro Poga. Drita changed its name to Dituria (meaning in English "Knowledge") after the third issue and moved the magazine's base to Bucharest. The magazine was placed under the direction of Pandeli Sotiri.

The publication was known to be against the wishes of the authorities and one of the writers, Naim Frashëri signed his name as just "D" to try to avoid being identified. The committee that supported the magazine also published books of the bible in Albanian. They managed to publish both the Gospel of Matthew and the book of Genesis in Albanian Tosk, and the Gospel of Matthew in Macedo-Roman (now called Aromanian).

This magazine was not just the first scholarly magazine in Albanian, it was part of the first modern use of written Albanian. The magazine was only possible because of the work of Koto Hoxhi, Sami Frashëri, Pashko Vasa and Jani Vreto who had devised an alphabet for expressing the Albanian language in 1879. Based on this it was possible to create the first alphabet book in Albanian, translate the Bible and publish Drita.

To avoid censureship, the magazine focused mainly on cultural issues. Publications continued through 1885 until the Ottoman Government halted its publication completely. At the same time the Ottoman government halted the existence of the Society for the Printing of the Albanian writings, that had been established in Istanbul by Sami Frashëri.

Publications restarted later in the 19th century first in Bucharest, Romania, and later in Sofia, Bulgaria, by Shahin Kolonja and the magazine retook its original name, Drita. Several articles published by Petro Nini Luarasi, who was editor-in-chief at that time, appeared on the magazine in the 1906-1908 period.

== History: 1922–1945 ==
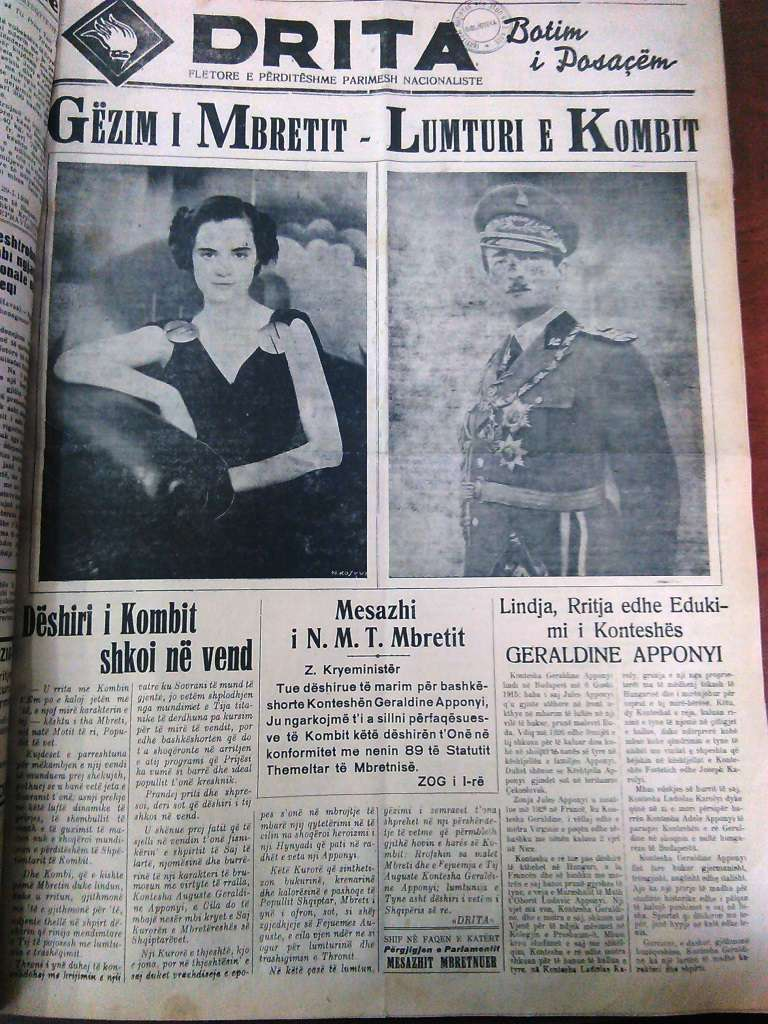
Cover page of Drita published in Tirana in 1935.

In 1922 the magazine restarted its publications again under Petro Poga. This time it was published in Gjirokaster, and now in an independent Albania. Urani Rumbo published several articles in Drita, which discussed the need to improve the rights and education of girls and women in Albania. In 1920 Urani Rumbo and others had published a declaration which signified the birth of the Women's Union in Albania (Albanian: Lidhja e Gruas, the first prominent feminist organization in Albania. The magazine closed again in 1924 due to clashes with the Fan Noli government. and reopened later and published by Zoi Xoxa. During the Fascist Italian presence in Albania in 1939-43 and the Nazi Germany presence in Albania in 1943-44 the magazine had to close for the third time.

== History: 1945–present ==
The magazine reopened in 1945 right after World War II and became the official magazine of the Albanian League of Writers and Artists. Editor in chief of the magazine for some time was Teodor Keko, a well known Albanian writer. The disbandment of the League in 2007, had the Association of the Young Modern Artists of Albania take over the magazine, which is still currently published.

In 1995 the magazine had 4,000 readers in the country.

== Notable contributors ==
- Ismail Kadare (1936–2024)

== See also ==
- List of magazines in Albania
