= Tumbling Down =

Tumbling Down may refer to:

- "Tumbling Down" (Cockney Rebel song), 1974
- "Tumbling Down" (Tessanne Chin song), 2013
- "Tumblin' Down" (Blind Melon song), 2008
- "Tumblin' Down" (Ziggy Marley song), 1988
- "Komm, süsser Tod", a song from the soundtrack of the film The End of Evangelion
- "Tumbling Down", a storyline in the science fiction comedy webtoon series Live with Yourself!

== See also ==
- The Walls Came Tumbling Down (disambiguation)
