= Ollga Plumbi =

Albanian politician

- Born: Ollga Plumbi; 1898; Lupckë, Përmet District, Ottoman Empire
- Died: 1984 (aged 85–86)
- Citizenship: Ottoman, Albanian
- Occupations: Writer, politician, feminist, activist, teacher
- Writing career
- Pen name: Shpresa
- Language: Albanian

Ollga Plumbi (1898 – 1984), also known with her pen name Shpresa, was an Albanian feminist, activist and politician. She also was elected as deputy of the Albanian parliament in 1945 but became known as one of the first feminists in Albania.

== Biography ==
Ollga Plumbi was born in the village of Lupckë of Përmet in 1898. After her husband died when she was young, she went to immigrate in the West to work in order to take care of her family and worked. She later returned to Albania and during 1936-1937 wrote in the publication "Bota e Re" along other progressive writers like Migjeni and Selim Shpuza.

During the Second World War she became part of the anti-fascist movement and later was elected as the head of Women's Antifascist Council of Albania. In the elections of 1945 she became a deputy of the People's Parliament and was second most voted deputy, behind only Enver Hoxha.

However soon she was removed from the post and sidelined from politics, but she still would write extensively on the feminism and gender equality.

== See also ==
- Sevasti Qiriazi
- Parashqevi Qiriazi
- Fatbardha Gega
- Urani Rumbo
- Musine Kokalari
