= Pristina Book Fair =

Annual book fair in Pristina, Kosova

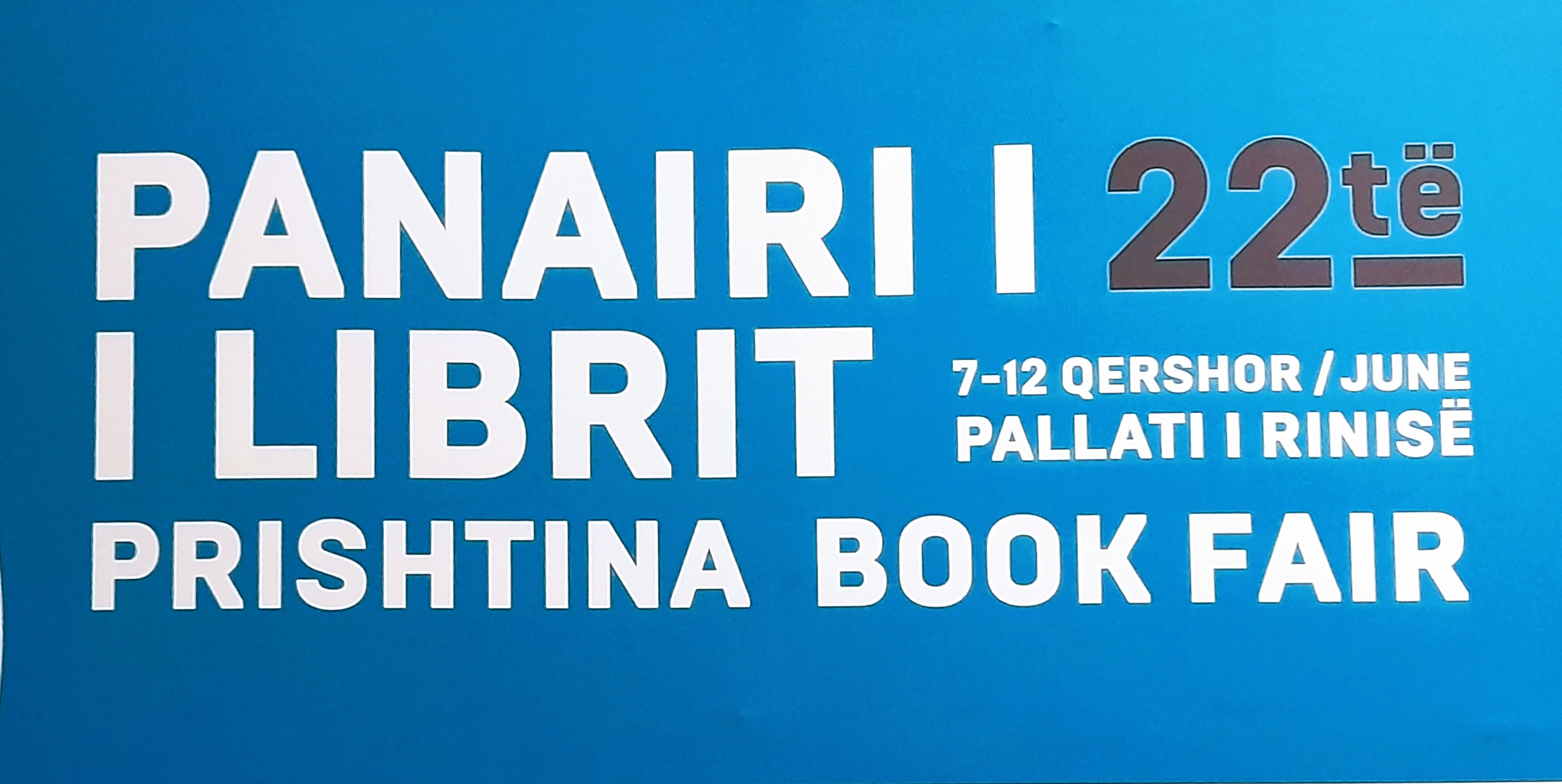
Pristina Book Fair

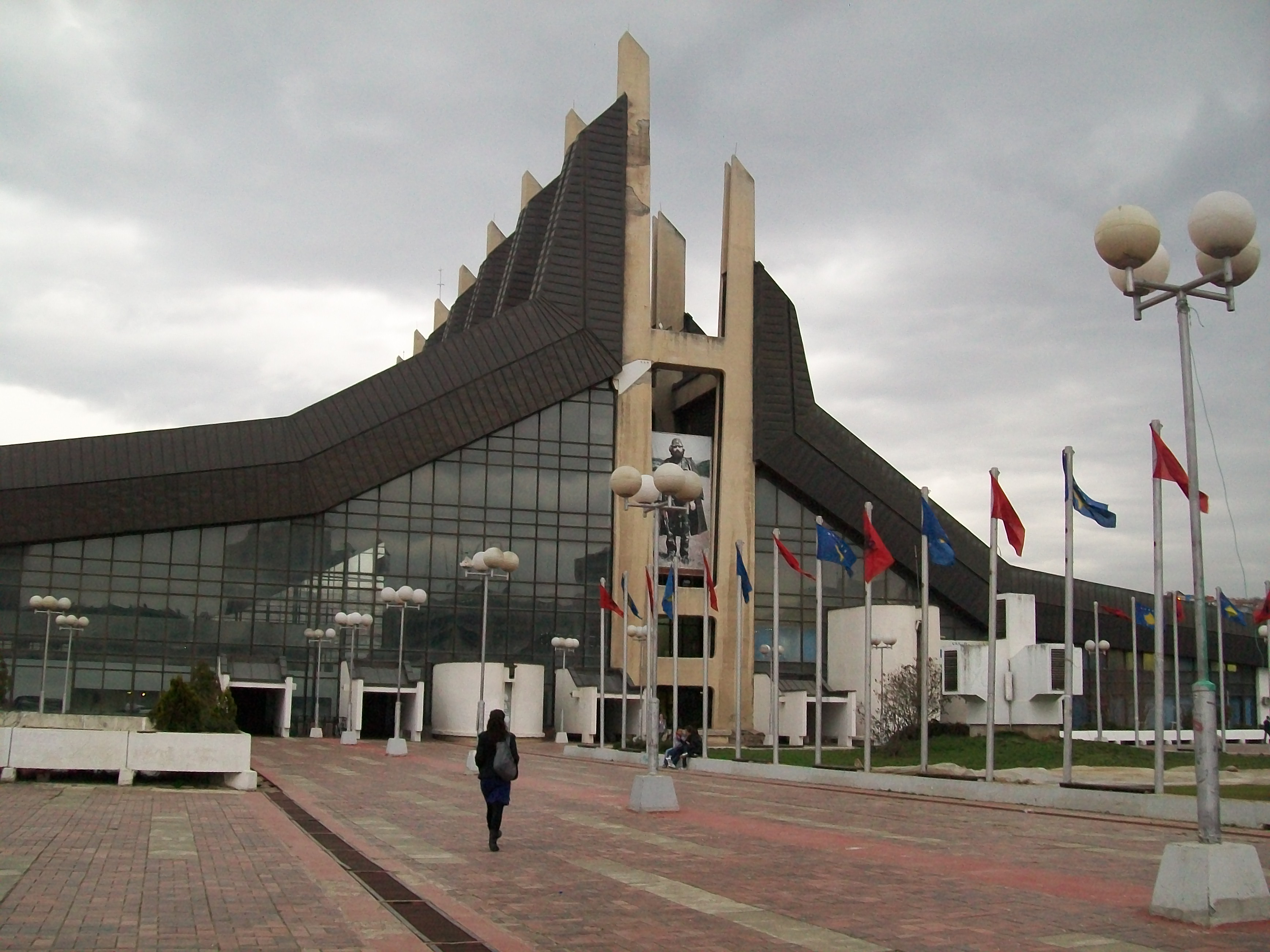
Palace of Youth and Sports - Pristina

The Pristina Book Fair is an annual book fair held in the Pristina, capital of Kosovo. The event is traditional organization and the participation of Kosovo's publishers with common stand at the fair on the world renowned - Frankfurt Book Fair. So far, there, at the Palace of Youth and Sports have been organized book fairs, every year. The first book fair took place on 17 to 22 November 1999 but others were organized during May and/or June. The number of participants is about 100 publishers, mostly from Kosovo, Albania, North Macedonia, Montenegro, Diaspora, etc.

There is a high number of books that are published mainly from Kosovan, Albanian, Macedonian and Montenegrins publishers and some foreign publishers (German, French, English etc.). The Book Fair in Prishtina is a significant event in Kosovo, and is a place where intellectuals and all other people promote the idea and the need on developing and affirming genuine values, as well as sound debates regarding books and writings.

== See also ==
- Pristina
- Fairs in Pristina
- Culture in Pristina
