= Social Democratic Party of Albania (1943) =

Albanian political organization, 1943–1946

- Partia Socialdemokrate e Shqipërisë
- Leader: Musine Kokalari
- Dates active: 1943–1946
- Dissolved: 1946
- Active regions: Albania
- Ideology: Social democracy
- Political position: Centre-left to left-wing
- Status: Banned in 1946
- Wars: World War II

The Social Democratic Party (Albanian: Partia Socialdemokrate e Shqipërisë) was an Albanian political organization that existed from 1943 to 1946. Created on the initiative of the writer and Social democratic activist Musine Kokalari. She had originally been allied with the Communists up until 1946, when she began to openly speak out from a general democratic position, and against the established dictatorship of the Communist Party and Enver Hoxha. It was banned by the Sigurimi during a repressive campaign. In Post-communist Albania it has been considered as an organization that had fought for democracy.

== Formation ==
The political movement for Social Democracy was considered absent in Albania in the 1940s. There was practically no developed industry in the country and, accordingly, no organized labor movements. However, the ideas of Democratic Socialism were shared by some representatives of the Albanian Intelligentsia. The first social democratic party in Albania was founded by the young but by that time well-known writer Musine Kokalari, the first Albanian woman writer. Social democracy in its understanding meant ideological and political unity based on freedom and social equality. In 1943, Kokalari joined the National Liberation Movement of Albania, which fought against the Italian and German occupiers. However, the LANC acted under the authority of the Communist Party, while the Social Democratically oriented Kokalari was not only anti-fascist but also anti-communist. In addition, she had a sharp conflict with Nexhmije Hoxha the wife of the leader of the Communist Party of Albania and the People's Liberation Front, Enver Hoxha.

Kokalari attempted to mediate a coalition between the pro-Communists and the nationalist movement Balli Kombëtar. According to her plan, this would shift both movements to a consistently democratic platform and would strengthen them in opposition to the occupiers. To strengthen her position, Kokalari decided to join not individually, but as the leader of her own political group.

Adhering to the center-left ideology of social democracy, Kokalari established the Social Democratic Party. She was supported by lawyer, playwright and publicist Mit'hat Araniti, lawyer Skënder Muço, literary critic Isuf Luzaj, and linguist Selman Riza.

== Program ==
The program of the Social Democratic Party was published in February 1944. In general, it was based on the Decalogue of Balli Kombetar However, the Social Democrats placed less emphasis on nationalist and social-populist attitudes and more on the priorities of democracy, human rights, civic nationalism and the rule of law. At the same time, Kokalari had a negative attitude towards right-wing radical anti-communists, such as Beqir Valteri or Gjon Markagioni. She accused them of collaborating with the occupiers, especially the Germans, of criminal banditry and causing chaos in the country.

Political freedom and social justice were declared inseparable concepts - this was the ideological feature of the new party. The intrinsic value of free thinking was emphasized. It was proposed to base the social system on the principles of unconditional equality of all Albanians and universal participation in civil life and incorporate into the state system the principle of alternation of power through democratic elections. Social Democrats, especially Kokalari personally, supported the idea of a Balkan Confederation.

The principles of the Social Democratic Party were legality, publicity, and openness - even in conditions of war and dictatorship. Party activity was reduced mainly to agitation and popularization of views. The mouthpiece of the party was the newspaper Zëri i lirisë (Voice of Freedom). During the existence of the party, six issues of the newspaper were published. Together with general democratic and constitutional-monarchist groups, the Social Democrats tried to create a legal opposition association, the Democratic Union.

The Social Democratic Party aroused severe hostility from both the German occupiers and the NOAA communists. In 1944, Skënder Muço was shot by the Nazis, Mit'hat Araniti was arrested by the communists and imprisoned, and killed by Communists. Kokalari herself was forced to distance herself from politics by running her bookstore in Tirana. She called the coming to power of the Communists led by Enver Hoxha at the end of November 1944 “the end of the Renaissance”

== Fate ==
Elections were scheduled for December 2, 1945. It was obvious that the voting would take place under the strict power control of the communists. In November 1945, leaders of the unarmed opposition, including Kokalari, issued a joint appeal. They demanded the postponement of the elections, ensuring freedom of election campaigning and inviting international observers. The appeal was transmitted to the diplomatic missions of the US and Great Britain - recent allies of the Communists.

In January 1946, state security arrested 37 legal opposition activists of various directions, including Kokalari. The progress of the investigation was supervised by Nesti Kerenxhi and Kadri Hazbiu. Kokalari and her associates were accused of creating an “anti-state social democratic group.” Kokalari held firm during the trial and insisted that she was right. On July 2, 1946, the military court handed down the sentences. 9 people were sentenced to death. Social Democrats were not executed but were sent to long prison sentences. Kokalari received 30 years, which was later reduced to 20 years. The Social Democratic Party ceased to exist and was banned.

After the fall of the communist regime, Kokalari (died 1983) was recognized as a Martyr of Democracy. Her image was popular in Albania, surrounded by honor and respect. The Social Democratic Party of the mid-1940s is considered an organization of peaceful anti-totalitarian struggle.

However, a strong social democratic movement did not emerge in post-communist Albania either. The corresponding rhetoric was used by the Socialist Party (the successors of the Communist Party of Albania) and the breakaway Socialist Movement for Integration. Two small left-of-center parties - the Social Democratic Party of Albania and the Social Democracy Party - do not enjoy serious influence. This situation is explained by the Albanian social structure and political culture, the sharp polarization of the political spectrum, and the importance of regional factors.

At the same time, some researchers predict the strengthening of social democratic tendencies as Albania integrates into Europe. Important importance is attached to the legacy of Kokalari and the dramatic experience of her party.
