= Musine Kokalari =

Albanian writer & politician (1917–1983)

Musine Kokelari
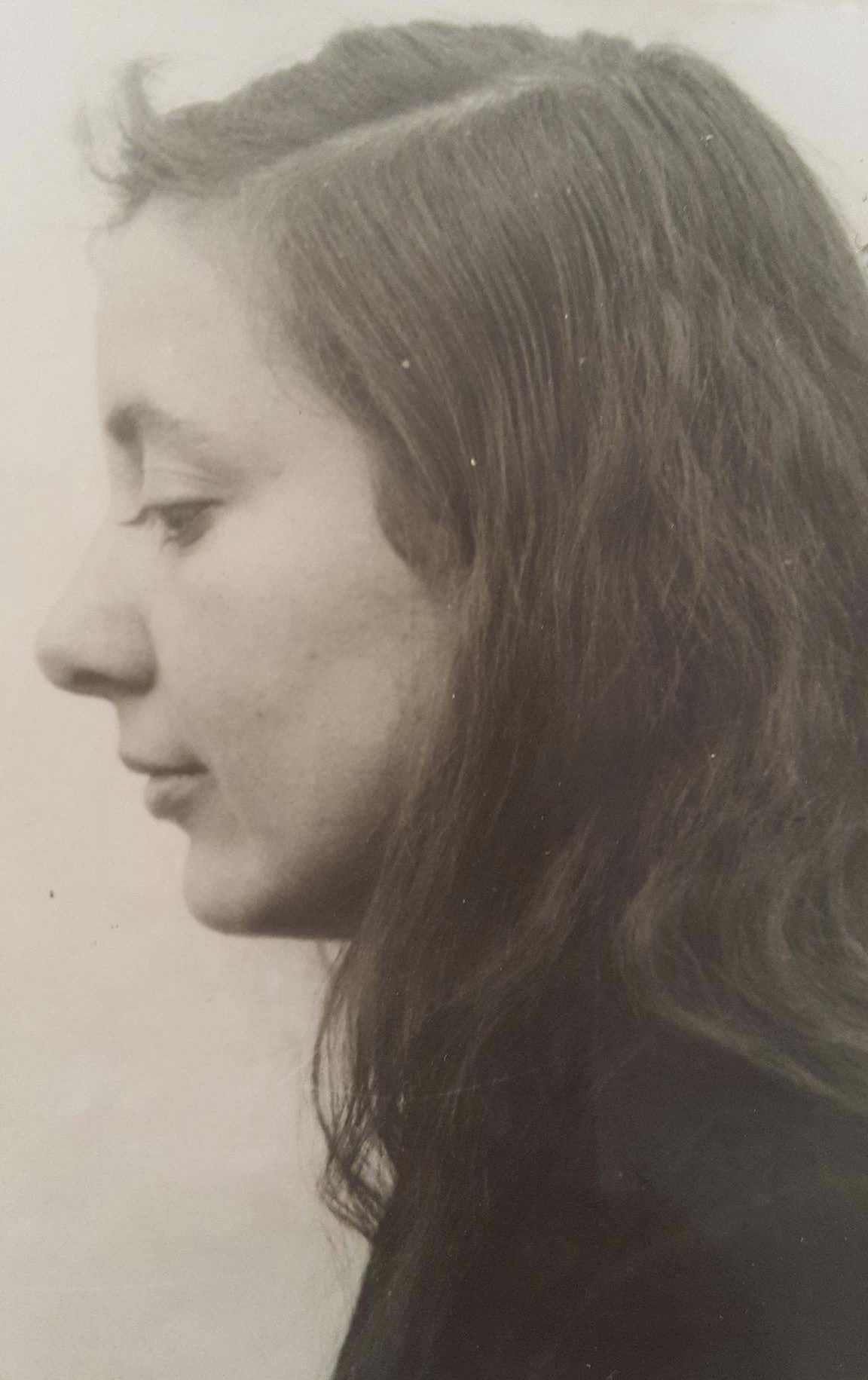
- Kokalari in 1945
- Born: Musine Kokalari; 10 February 1917; Adana, Ottoman Empire (modern Turkey)
- Died: 13 August 1983 (aged 66); Rrëshen, Albania
- Education: Literature
- Alma mater: La Sapienza University
- Occupation: Writer
- Relatives: Arba Kokalari (granddaughter)
- Writing career
- Language: Albanian
- Notable works: "As my old mother tells me" (1941, Albanian: 'Siç me thotë nënua plakë); "Around the Hearth (1944, (Albanian: Rreth vatrës); "How life swayed" (1944, (Albanian: Sa u tund jeta...).

Musine Kokalari (10 February 1917 – 13 August 1983) was an Albanian prose writer and politician in Albania's pre-communist period. She was the founder of the Social-Democratic Party of Albania in 1943. Kokalari was one of the first published female writers of Albania. After a short involvement in politics during World War II, she was persecuted by the communist regime in Albania, and not allowed to write anymore. She died in poverty and complete isolation.

== Life ==
=== Early life ===
Musine was born on February 10, 1917, in Adana, southern Turkey. Her grandfather, Hamit Kokalari, had completed his higher studies in theology and philosophy in Turkey and was considered part of the intellectuals of the time in the Gjirokastër area, the region from which he originated. Her father, Reshati, had studied law in Istanbul, where he settled with his family. Musine was the youngest in the family, while she had three other brothers Mumtazi, Vesimi and Hamiti, whom also had a good education, both in the linguistic-literary and legal fields. Three years after her birth, Musine's family returned to Albania and settled in their hometown, Gjirokastër. She grew up among books, music heard on the gramophone and especially fairy tales, stories and traditional Albanian songs, while she also completed a part of primary school in the city. Then she moved to Tirana, near the institute "Motrat Qiriazi" and the high school "Nana Mbretneshë" where she studied until 1937. She achieved excellent results through writings that immediately attracted the attention of personalities of literature, linguistics, philology, ethnography, studies of the folklore of the Albanian intellectual circles with which the young Musine had the opportunity to come in contact. The "Venus" bookstore, owned by her brother Vesimi, became an important point of reference and cultural deepening in the Albanian capital, also played a role in such relations; as well as the publishing house "Mesagjeritë shqiptare" led by her other brother, Mumtazi, through which basic works such as those by Edgar Allan Poe, Walter Scott, Shakespeare, Omar Khajami, Vicente Blasco Ibáñez were translated and published.

In 1937, she started publishing a number of articles on social issues in the Shtypi newspaper writing under the moniker Muza (the Muse) which itself is a pun of its real name.

In 1938, Musine would leave for Rome to begin her university studies at Università degli Studi di Roma "La Sapienza". A year later she wrote her first professional work called Sic me thote nenua plakë (As the old woman told me), a book which would be published only in 1941 in Tirana. With her publications Musine had managed to arouse the interest of important writers such as Lasgush Poradeci, Ali Asllani and above all, Ernest Koliqi, whom at La Sapienza was the founder of the Institute of Albanian Studies. Koliqi quickly became a fundamental point of reference for the young writer and researcher, a model to be followed both in the scientific and poetic-literary field. Under the supervision of Namik Resuli, Musine worked on her doctoral thesis on Naim Frashëri (1846–1900). Through long archival research for which she was assisted by the nephew of the great poet, Mit'hat Frashëri, she illustrates in detail the multifaceted aspects that in Albania have made Naim Frashëri a symbol of national literature.

=== Political career and imprisonment ===
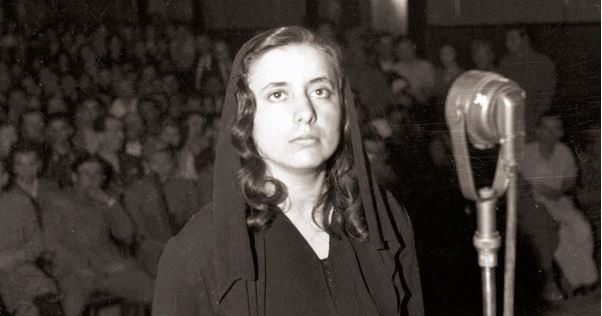
Photo taken during her trial in 1946

As World War II came to an end, Kokalari herself opened a bookstore and was invited to become a member of the Albanian League of Writers and Artists, created on October 7, 1945, under the chairmanship of Sejfulla Malëshova. All the time she was haunted by the execution without trial of her two brothers, Mumtaz and Vejsim, on November 12, 1944, by the communists and candidly demanded justice and retribution. Having herself been closely associated in 1944 with the fledgling Albanian Social-Democratic party and its press organ Zëri i lirisë ("The voice of freedom"), she was arrested on January 17, 1946, in an age of terror concomitant with the arrest of Malëshova, and on July 2, 1946, was sentenced to twenty years in prison by the military court of Tirana as a saboteur and enemy of the people.

Right before her arrest Kokalari had sent a letter to the Allied Forces, which were still based in the Albanian capital, Tirana. In her letter she called for free elections and freedom of expression. At the trial, Kokalari stated the following:

I don't need to be a communist to love my country. I love my country even though I am not a communist. I love its progress. You boast that you have won the war, and now you are the winner you want to extinguish those who you call political opponents. I think differently from you but I love my country. You are punishing me for my ideals!

=== Life in internment and death ===
In 1964, after 18 years in the Prison of Burrel in the District of Mat region, isolated and under constant surveillance, she spent the following next 19 years of her life in internment in the town of Rrëshen, Northern Albania, where she had to work as a street sweeper. She was never allowed to resume her writing.

She died in August 1983, in extreme poverty, after a swift battle with cancer.

Her granddaughter is Arba Kokalari, an Albanian-born Swedish Member of the European Parliament.

== Publications ==
She had, at the age of twenty-four, indeed already published an initial 80-page collection of ten youthful prose tales in her native Gjirokastrian dialect: As my old mother tells me (Albanian: Siç me thotë nënua plakë), Tirana, 1941. This historic collection, strongly inspired by Tosk folklore and by the day-by-day struggles of women of Gjirokastër, is thought to be the first work of literature ever written and published by a woman in Albania. Their value consists of the very lively dialect of Gjirokastër and the prevailing mores of the region. Kokalari called the book, "the mirror of a world gone by, the path of transition from girlhood with its melodies and the first years of marriage to the world of the grown woman, once again bound by the heavy chains of slavery to patriarchal fanaticism."

In mid-1943 Musine together with Nexhmije Xhuglini Hoxha founded the magazine for women "Shqiptarja e Re". This magazine continued throughout the dictatorship and was the first avenue for women's stories after Albanian's liberation and it was published by Albanian United Women organisation chaired by Nexhimije Hoxha from 1946–1952. With Musine's craft and talent as a writer enabled its publishing whilst she was arrested and during her trial in June 1946, this very magazine called her a terrorist and appealed to "People's Justice" to pass on Musine Kokalari the heaviest punishment. Three years later, despite the vicissitudes of World War II, Kokalari now twenty-seven, was able to publish a longer collection of short stories and sketches entitled How life swayed (Albanian: Sa u-tunt jeta), Tirana, 1944, a total of 348-pages which established her—ever so briefly—as a writer of substance. A third volume of her folksy tales was entitled Around the Hearth (Albanian: Rreth vatrës), Tirana, 1944.

== Recognition ==
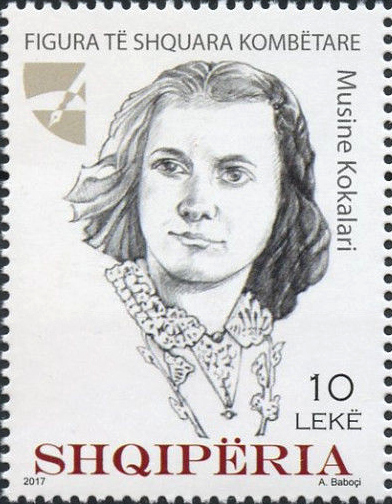
Kokalari on a 2017 stamp of Albania

Kokalari was one of the first 30 imprisoned writers to be listed in 1960 by the Committee of the Three (precursor of International PEN). In 1993 Kokalari was posthumously declared a Martyr of Democracy by the President of Albania and a school in Tirana now bears her name.

She is one of the principal subjects of the essay collection No Man's Lands: eight extraordinary women in Balkan history, by the Anglo-Kosovan writers Elizabeth Gowing and Robert Wilton.

== See also ==
- Sevasti Qiriazi
- Parashqevi Qiriazi
- Fatbardha Gega
- Urani Rumbo
- Ollga Plumbi
