= Měník =

- Municipality
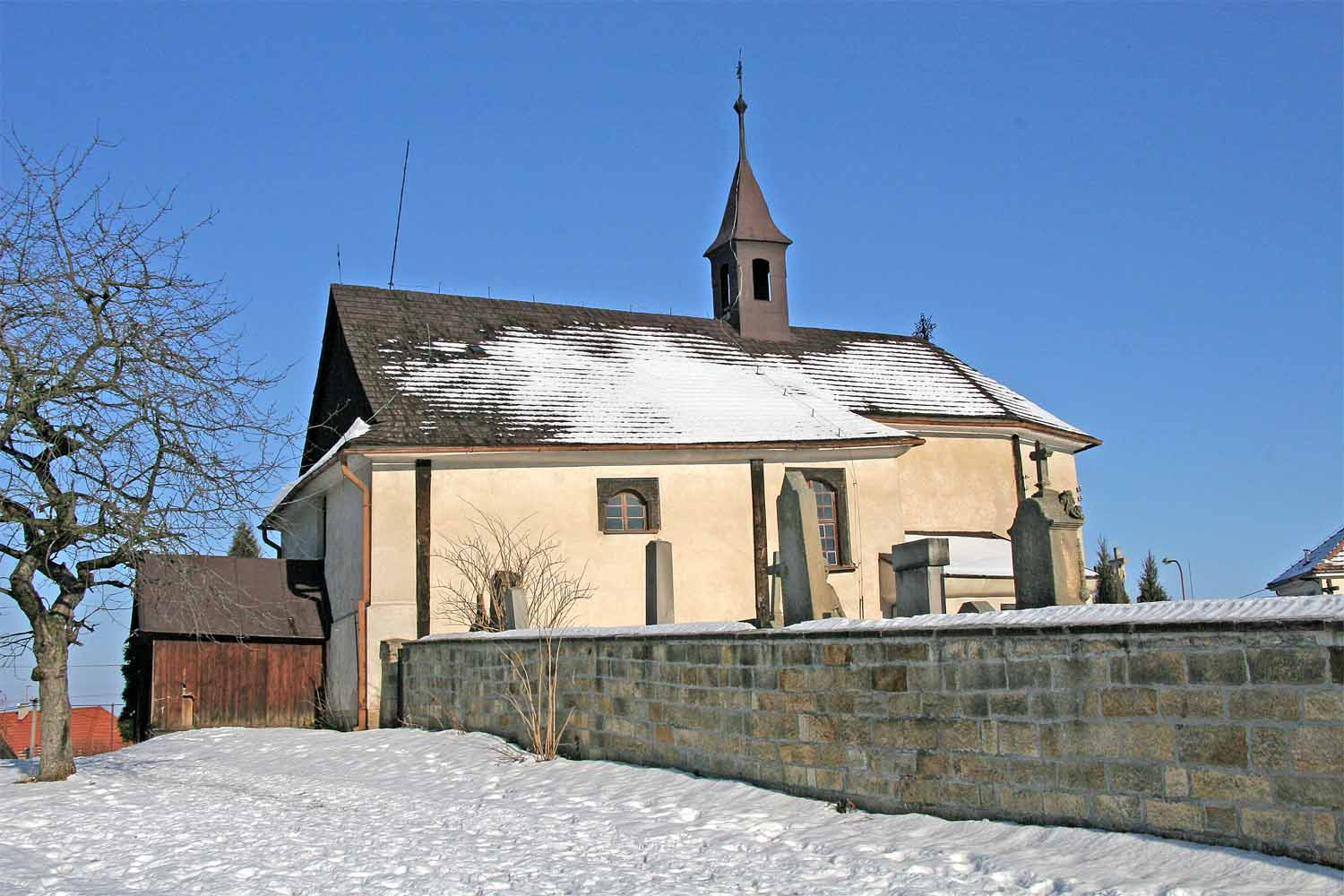
- Church of Saint Wenceslaus

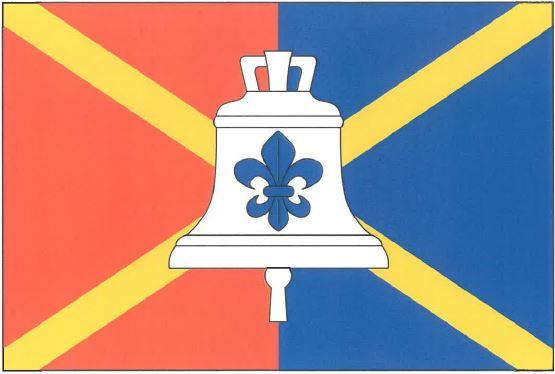
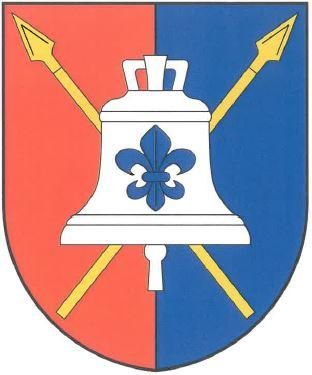
- Flag Coat of arms

- Location in the Czech Republic
- Coordinates: 50°12′56″N 15°31′42″E
- Country: Czech Republic
- Region: Hradec Králové
- District: Hradec Králové
- First mentioned: 1323

Area
  - Total: 9.60 km^{2} (3.71 sq mi)
- Elevation: 265 m (869 ft)

Population (2026-01-01)
  - Total: 655
  - Density: 68.2/km^{2} (177/sq mi)
- Time zone: UTC+1 (CET)
  - Summer (DST): UTC+2 (CEST)
- Postal code: 503 64
- Website: www.menik.cz

Měník is a municipality and village in Hradec Králové District in the Hradec Králové Region of the Czech Republic. It has about 700 inhabitants.

== Administrative division ==
Měník consists of four municipal parts (in brackets population according to the 2021 census):

- Měník (351)
- Barchůvek (77)
- Bydžovská Lhotka (145)
- Libeň (18)

== Demographics ==
Historical population
Year	Pop.	±%
1869	1,109	—
1880	1,112	+0.3%
1890	1,109	−0.3%
1900	1,077	−2.9%
1910	1,026	−4.7%
1921	977	−4.8%
1930	909	−7.0%
1950	634	−30.3%
1961	618	−2.5%
1970	600	−2.9%
1980	562	−6.3%
1991	510	−9.3%
2001	530	+3.9%
2011	582	+9.8%
2021	591	+1.5%
Source: Censuses
