= Gruaja Shqiptare =

Historic women's organization in Albania

Gruaja Shqiptare was a women's organization in Albania, active between 1928 and 1939. It was a state supported women's rights organization with the task of promoting government policy in women's rights.

== History ==
Prior to the national organization Gruaja Shqiptare, a number of local women's rights organization had existed with the same name. The Albanian women's rights movement had started among a couple of urban women intellectuals under the leadership of Sevasti Qiriazi and Parashqevi Qiriazi, but it had been interrupted by World War I. When Albania won its independence after the war, the women's movement were resumed. Marie Çoba of Shkodër founded a local women's organization called Gruaja Shqiptare in 1920, and several independent local organizations with the same name were founded in Korçë, Vlorë and Tirana. While these organizations had the same name, they were separate from each other and functioned independently.

When King Zog I of Albania took control on Albania, all political organization was dissolved, including the local Gruaja Shqiptare women's organizations. In October 1928 a national women's organization was founded to incorporate all local organizations, and was given the name Gruaja Shqiptare, a name which had already been popular among the previous organizations. It was a national organization, which incorporated all the formerly dissolved organizations as wll as founding new branches. While the organization had the task to simply enforce the policy of King Zog I of Albania, this policy was in fact, a radical and progressive state feminism, as the Civil Code of 1928 secured women the right to equal inheritance, divorce, education and the right to work, as well as banning of arranged marriages, harems and the veil. It was under the protection of the queen mother Sadije Toptani, and its chairperson was Princess Senije Zogu.

The task of this state woman's organisation was to support the official policy within women's rights rather than to act independently, and to campaign and enforce the new reforms in women's rights through its local branches. The government policy was however radical, as the Civil Code of 1928 stated that women had equal right to inheritance and divorce, abolished arranged and forced marriage and polygamy and gave women the right to education and a professional life. The Albanian women's movement were supported by educated urban elite women who were inspired by the state feminism of Turkey under Kemal Ataturk; the Zog regime were willing to grant women all rights except political rights such as women's suffrage, which it regarded as unnecessary and inspired by Western Europe. Among the many reforms which was enforced by the women's association through its local branches were the abolition of the veil, which was to be enforced by persuasion and campaigning rather than aggressively, and the king's sisters were given the task to act as role models by appearing unveiled in public.

Under Princess Senijé, the Gruaja Shqiptare founded local branches in 20 cities, published its own paper and supported numerous projects in support of the regime's women's policy, especially regarding education. In reality, however, the work did not manage to achieve much success outside of the cosmopolitan elite of the cities and was in practice mostly of benefit to the upper class. In Post war Communist Albania, it was replaced by Union of Albanian Women.
