= Shaqe Çoba =

Albanian Feminist

- Born: 1875; Shkodër, Sanjak of Scutari, Ottoman Empire
- Died: 1954
- Other names: Marie Çoba
- Occupation(s): Feminist and suffragette
- Spouse: Ndoc Çoba
- Awards: Naim Frashëri Order

Shaqe Çoba, née Shiroka, (1875–1954) was an Albanian feminist and suffragist. She founded The Albanian Woman (Albanian: Gruaja Shqiptare), an organization for upper-class women which briefly published a magazine of the same name that covered women's issues.

== Life ==
Shaqe Çoba was born in Shkodër, which was then part of the Sanjak of Scutari of the Ottoman Empire, in 1875. She attended middle school in a convent school in Zagreb, Croatia, then part of the Austro-Hungarian Empire. On the way to attend school in Venice, Italy, in 1904, she met her future husband Ndoc Çoba, with whom she had one son. She died in 1954.

== Work ==
On 3 August 1920, Shaqe Çoba founded and led The Albanian Woman for upper-class women of Shkodër to help support the Albanian National Army defending against Yugoslav incursions into northern Albania. The organization was also concerned with the emancipation of women and published a magazine of the same name that publicized the name of donors and the amounts donated to encourage donations for distribution to the soldiers and their families. The magazine published many articles on Albanian women's "rights and duties" before it closed after publishing its July 1921 issue.

== Legacy ==
On the ninetieth anniversary of Albanian independence in November 2002, the President of the Republic of Albania, Alfred Moisiu, posthumously awarded Çoba the Naim Frashëri Order (Albanian: Urdhri "Naim Frashëri") for her participation in the 1920s independence movement as a fighter "against the division of Albania and for the emancipation of the Albanian woman."
