= Union of Albanian Women =

Mass organization for women in socialist Albania

Union of Albanian Women (Unioni i Grave Shqiptare) was an important mass organization in socialist Albania, founded in 1943 and dissolved in 1992. As with other mass organizations and associations during the time period, it was affiliated with the Democratic Front.

== History ==
The Union of Albanian Women was founded as a branch of the Communist Party in 1943, and named the name Anti-Fascist Women of Albania (or Antifascist Women's Union). It changed name to Union of Albanian Women during its 1946 congress.

Its task was mobilizing the political and social activities of the country's women, handling their ideological training, and leading the campaign for the emancipation of women. This campaign, initiated in 1966 by Hoxha, had considerable success in securing equal social and political rights for women. As part of the campaign, women from the cities were dispatched to rural regions to explain to the party's line on the role of women. By the late-1980s, women accounted for 47 percent of the labor force and about 30 percent of deputies to the People's Assembly. Women held responsible jobs at all levels of government and received equal pay in most jobs.

The union was headed until 1946 by Ollga Plumbi, in 1946-1952 by Nexhmije Hoxha, in 1952-1982 by Vito Kapo, and in 1990 by Lumturie Rexha, a member of the Central Committee of the Party of Labour of Albania.

The Union of Albanian Women was dissolved in 1992.

== See also ==
- Urani Rumbo, Albanian feminist of the early 20th century.
- Gruaja Shqiptare
