= The Walls Came Tumbling Down: The Collapse of Communism in Eastern Europe =

Book by Gale Stokes

- Author: Gale Stokes
- Language: English
- Genre: Non-fiction
- Publisher: Oxford University Press
- Publication date: 1993

The Walls Came Tumbling Down: The Collapse of Communism in Eastern Europe was published by Oxford University Press, New York in 1993 and is a work of non-fiction based on events in Eastern Europe from 1968 to 1991. It was written by Gale Stokes, then a professor emeritus of history at Rice University. The book received the 1993 Wayne S. Vucinich Prize of the American Association for the Advancement of Slavic Studies for the Best Book Published in Russian and East European Studies.

== Summary ==
Beginning with the 1968 Soviet-led invasion of Czechoslovakia and culminating in the 1989-1991 revolutions, The Walls Came Tumbling Down is a narrative of the gradual collapse of Eastern European communism. Focusing on the decades of unrest that precipitated 1989's tumultuous events, Stokes provides a history of the various communist regimes and the opposition movements that brought them down, including the "March Days" and Solidarity, the 1975 Helsinki Accords, Czechoslovakia's Charter 77 opposition movement, and the autocratic policies of Romania's Nicolae Ceauşescu that precipitated the 1989 Revolution. Stokes examines the first tottering steps in 1990-1991 toward pluralist government, from the resignation of Mikhail Gorbachev to the bloody partitioning of war-torn Yugoslavia.

== See also ==
- Gender roles in post-communist Central and Eastern Europe
