= Urani Rumbo =

Albanian writer (1895–1936)

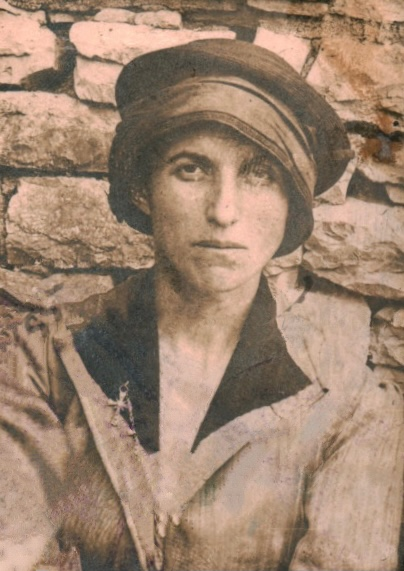
- Urani Rumbo
- Born: 20 January 1885; Stegopul, Libohovë, Ottoman Empire
- Died: 26 March 1936 (aged 51); Vlorë, Albania
- Occupation: Teacher
- Known for: Women's leader
- Parent(s): Spiro and Athina Rumbo

Urani Rumbo (20 January 1895 – 26 March 1936) was an Albanian feminist, teacher, and playwright. She founded various associations promoting Albanian women's rights, the most important of which was the Lidhja e Gruas (Woman's Union), one of the first prominent feminist organizations of Albania.

== Biography ==
Urani Rumbo was born in December 1895 in Stegopul, a village near Gjirokastër in what is today southern Albania. Her father, Spiro Rumbo, was a teacher in the nearby villages and her mother, Athana, was a housewife. She had three brothers, Kornil, Thanas, and Dhimitër Rumbo, and a sister Emily as well a teacher at the elementary school.

She received elementary education and completed six grades at the school of Filiates, where her father worked as a teacher. At the same time she became familiar with the works of notable Albanian folklorists and writers. She knew how to write in Albanian and Greek fluently and from the age of fifteen she began teaching Albanian literature. From 1910 Rumbo attended a high school in Ioannina, but her education was interrupted by the Balkan Wars. During the war she taught herself Italian and French.

From 1916 to 1917 she worked in Dhoksat, a town in southern Albania, as a teacher of Albanian literature, where she promoted the use of the Albanian language. From 1917 to 1918 she taught in Mingul and Nokovë, while in 1919 she taught in the De Rada school of Gjirokastër. In 1919 she began an initiative against female illiteracy and a tradition of restricting women to specific parts of the household. In 1920 she opened the Koto Hoxhi school, named after Koto Hoxhi, one of the Rilindas of Albania. The Koto Hoxhi school was a five-year primary school for girls, from all parts of Gjirokastër and of all religions. A few years later she became the director of the school.

In the period of the democratic movement in Albania from 1921 to 1924, Rumbo published in local newspapers Demokratia and Drita articles on problems faced by Albanian women, especially the issue of education. At the same period she developed training courses for women in tailoring, embroidering, agriculture, music and gardening. She also wrote and directed theater plays and organized school theater performances to encourage girls to participate in public life.

On November 23, 1920, with Hashibe Harshova, Naxhije Hoxha, and Xhemile Balili she founded in Gjirokastër Lidhja e Gruas, one of the most important feminist organizations of Albania promoting women's emancipation. They published a declaration in the newspaper Drita, protesting social conditions and discrimination against women. In 1923 Urani Rumbo began a campaign along with other women for the right of girls to attend the lyceum of Gjirokastër as boys did.

On July 25, 1924, Rumbo founded the feminist organization Përmirësimi "Improvement". Përmirësimi organized educational courses for women of different social statuses. On July 4, 1930, she was accused by the authorities of encouraging girl students of the Koto Hoxhi school to perform in theater plays. She responded with an article in the newspaper Demokratia denouncing the accusations as absurd. Although she was supported by public opinion across Albania, the ministry of education transferred her to Vlorë, where she worked until her death on March 26, 1936.

== Legacy ==
There have been written two biographies of Urani Rumbo. The first, Urani Rumbo: Mësuese e Popullit (Urani Rumbo: Teacher of the People) was published in 1977, while the second Urani Rumbo punëtore e shquar e shkollës shqiptare (Urani Rumbo, distinguished worker of the Albanian school) was published in 2008.

On March 1, 1961, Urani Rumbo was posthumously awarded the Mësuese e Popullit (Teacher of the People) medal. A school in the city of Gjirokastër was named after her.

== See also ==
- Sevasti Qiriazi – Albanian activist and educator (ca. 1870–1949)
- Parashqevi Qiriazi – Albanian educational theorist
- Fatbardha Gega – Albanian psychologist and educational theorist
- Musine Kokalari – Albanian writer & politician (1917–1983)
- Ollga Plumbi – Albanian politician
