= Fatbardha Gega =

Albanian psychologist and educational theorist

Fatbardha Gega (1919–1999) was an Albanian pedagogist, and one of the best-known academics of Albanian pedagogical and psychological thought in the second half of the twentieth century in Albania.

== Biography ==
Gega was born in Fier, Albania. After finishing the Woman's Institute Nana Mbretneshë in Tirana, she studied in the Faculty of Medicine of the University of Florence in Italy.

She started working as a teacher of history in 1942 at the school "Donika Kastrioti" in Shkodër. She was the director of this school and deputy director of history, pedagogy and psychology in the Tirana secondary pedagogical school "17 Nëntori". In 1965, she worked as a scientific collaborator in the Institute of Studies and School Publications, while from 1966 she was in the Directorate of Pedagogical Studies in the Ministry of Education.

== Works ==
Gega left many creative works as a legacy for the fund of Albanian pedagogy. She compiled the text "Psychology" (for secondary pedagogical schools) and was co-author of the text "Methods of teaching – educational work in school" (1972). In the book "To forge strong characters" (1968), she raised her voice against pedagogical bureaucracy and offers an original treatment of modern Albanian pedagogy. She did the same in her works. "The school and the family, (Important factors in the civic education of children)", "Teacher – pupil relations" and others. New pages in didactic and historical pedagogical thought were written in her articles. Her principal work were collected and published in Tirana with title "For you teachers and parents" (2002).

== See also ==
- Urani Rumbo
- Sevasti Qiriazi
- Parashqevi Qiriazi
