= Ksanthipi Bufi =

Albanian academician and veteran (born 1927)

- Born: Ksanthipi Xhoxhi; 6 December 1927 (age 98); Lushnje, Albania
- Education: Queen Mother Pedagogical Institute
- Known for: LANÇ veteran
- Spouse: Sokrat Bufi (deceased)
- Children: 3, Ylli Bufi

Ksanthipi Bufi (née: Xhoxhi; born 6 December 1927) is an Albanian partisan, academician and veteran of LANÇ.

== Life ==
Ksanthipi was born in Lushnje on 6 December 1927 where she spend a difficult childhood. At the age of 4 she was orphaned. She completed her studies at the Donika Kastrioti School in Shkodër, when later she completed her high studies in pedagogy and teaching. She was also part of Queen Mother Pedagogical Institute with Nexhmije Hoxha, Liri Belishova, Mynever Shuteriqi and Didi Biçaku. Bufi was married to Sokrat Bufi until his death in 1956. He was 36 years old and was poisened under circumstances that are still unclear. In 1940s when she was still a student, she became a partisan and Member of National Liberation Movement participant.

Ksanthipi retired in 1980s as a principal of Janaq Kilica High School, she had four children, one of them is Former Prime Minister of Albania Ylli Bufi. She now resides in Tirana.
