= "28 Nëntori" Gymnasium =

First state gymnasium in Albania

Coordinates: 42.0656°N 19.5113°E

- Gjimnazi "28 Nëntori"
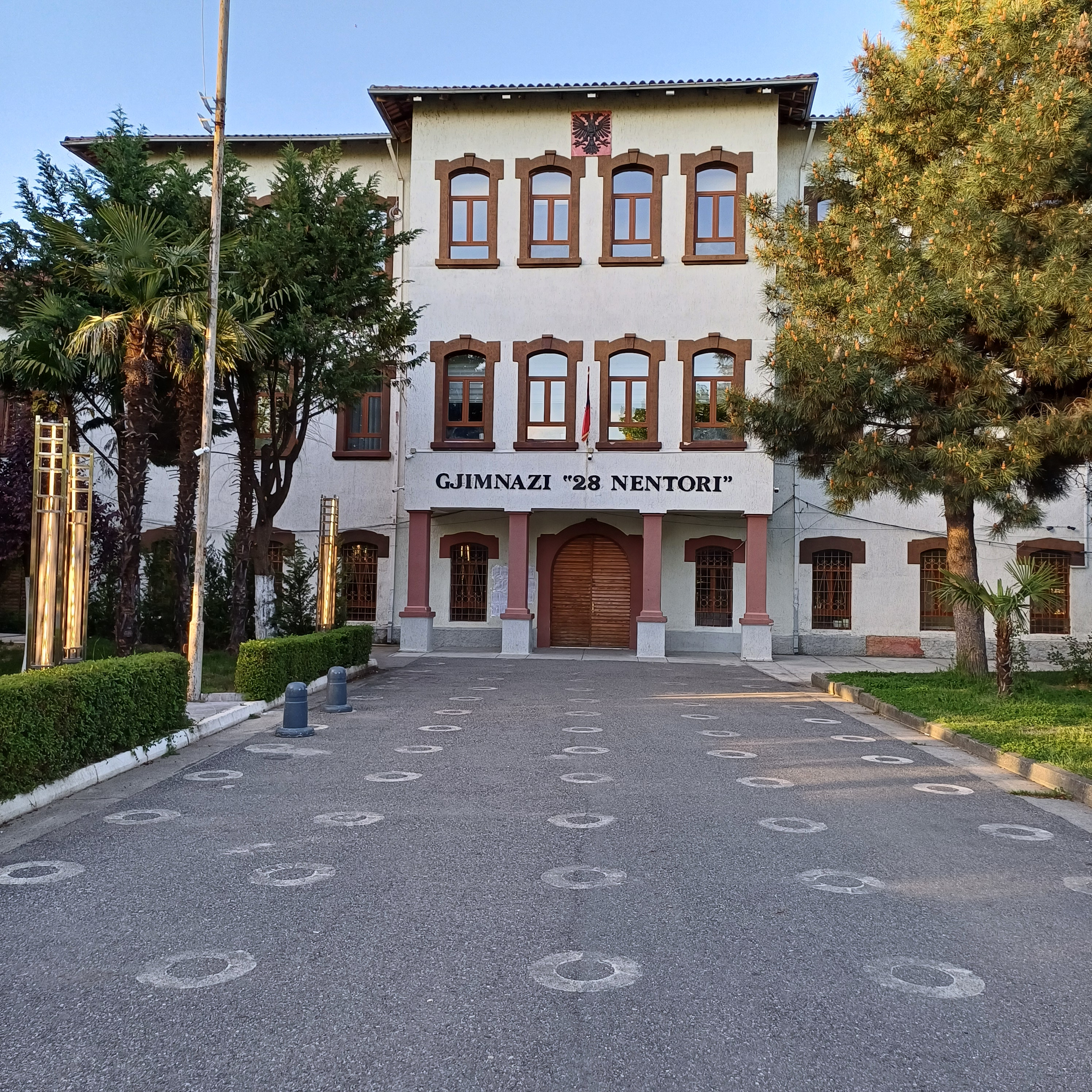
- Shkodër; Albania

Information
- Type: Public
- Established: 5 October 1922; 103 years ago
- Principal: Albana Bushati
- Staff: 41
- Colors: Red and Blue
- Website: 28-nentori.com

The "28 Nëntori" Gymnasium (Albanian: Gjimnazi "28 Nëntori") is a public upper secondary school (gymnasium) in Shkodër, Albania. It was established as the State Gymnasium (Albanian: Gjimnazi i Shtetit) on 5 October 1922, by the request of city's intellectuals. It is the first secular high school in Albania. It was decorated Honor of the Nation by the President of Albania Bajram Begaj on 5 October 2022, in a ceremony celebrating its 100th anniversary.

== History ==
The public, secular gymnasium in Shkodër was opened by a decision of the Council of Ministers, August 11, 1922, as the answer for a petition of 58 signatures, which stated the request as a necessity for a public, secular school in Shkodër. Although before that, there was a state school in the city, such as Parruca School, which was administered by the Education Commission established in 1913, near the City Hall, directed by high personalities such as Xhemal Naipi, Hafiz Ibrahim Repishti, Mustafa Kruja, Gjergj Fishta, Hafiz Abaz Golemi, Anton Harapi etc., who encouraged and became the main promoters of the opening of the State Gymnasium, even though some of them were lecturers in non-state schools.

The school was opened on October 5, 1922. The students came from religious city schools, the Franciscan gymnasium, from madrassas and later from Kosovo and Ulcinj. At that time, a principal with scientific authority was required, for this Maximilian Lambertz was proposed (Lambertz, 1882–1963).

Its first principal was Xhevat Korça (January 10, 1893 – July 27, 1959), former Education Minister in the Government of Mustafa Kruja. Korça studied at University of Vienna for Philosophy. He died in the notorious Burrel prison, a victim of the communist dictatorship. In the second school year of the high school, the principal was Prof. Mirash Ivanaj (March 12, 1891 – September 22, 1953) He was a publicist, lawyer, educator and Minister of Education with a significant contribution to education policy, with the so-called "Ivanaj Reform". He died in prison, right before completing his sentence.

In this State Gymnasium, a group of patriotic teachers practiced their profession, who implemented the most efficient programs of a more advanced school system. The first were Prof. Kolë Kamsi, Simon Rrota, Ndue Paluca, Ruhi Zeka, Luigj Shala, and later over the years, many prominent personalities were appointed to this gymnasium, such as Aleksandër Xhuvani, Skender Luarasi, Eqrem Çabej, Mustafa Demiri. Teachers worked with the curriculum of the French gymnasiums adopted by the 1922 Educational Congress.

== Notable people ==
Teachers and principals:

- Eqrem Çabej, (1908–1980) Linguist, albanologist and academic
- Mirash Ivanaj (1831–1951) Politician, minister and school director
- Aleksandër Xhuvani (1880–1961) Philologist and educator
- Skender Luarasi (1900–1982) scholar, writer

== See also ==
- Education in Albania
- History of education in Albania
