= Shefik Osmani =

Albanian educational theorist

Shefik Osmani (20 May 1923 – 22 July 2012) was an Albanian pedagogist, scholar, researcher and educational theorist.

== Biography ==
Shefik Osmani was born on 20 May 1923 in Shkodër, where he attended primary and secondary school. He graduated from the Higher Pedagogical Institute of Tirana as well as the literature studies program at the University of Tirana. For study purposes, he stayed at several institutions in European countries. He devoted his whole life to education, educational organizations, and educational studies. He was a teacher and the director of pedagogical schools in Peshkopi, Shkodër and Tirana. After that, he was an education inspector at the Ministry of Education and Culture in Tirana before becoming the sector manager, namely the head of the drafting of texts for the lower cycle of primary schools. In the years 1970–1990, he was a scientific associate at the Institute of Pedagogical Studies in Tirana. In the meantime, he engaged in scientific activities, especially in the fields of didactics, the history of education, and Albanian and world pedagogical thought. In addition to hundreds of professional-scientific studies articles, he also published a series of works.

The Albanian diaspora has been greatly aided in the development of education by Osmani, who has given considerable help. He has received multiple awards and recognitions, among which are numerous titles and recognitions.

Shefik Osmani died on 22 July 2012 in Tirana.

== Publications ==
- "Probleme të mësimdhënies" (1982)
- "Fjalor i pedagogjisë" (1983)
- "Një misionar në shërbim të kombit" (1996)
- "Pjetër Bogdani" (1996)
- "J. H. Pestaloci dhe arsimi fillor" (1997)
- "Panteoni iranian dhe iranologët shqiptare" (1998)
- "Reflekse etno- pedagogjike (1998)
- "Naim Frashëri-Vepra letrare pedagogjike" (2001)
- "Shpalime etnopedagogjike II" (2008)

== See also ==
- Education in Albania
- History of education in Albania
