= Mynever Shuteriqi =

Albanian writer and academician (1924–2024)

- Born: Mynever Fico; 21 June 1924; Gjirokastër, Albania
- Died: 20 November 2024 (aged 100); Tirana, Albania
- Education: Queen Mother Pedagogical Institute
- Occupation(s): Writer, academician
- Spouse: Dhimitër Shuteriqi (m. 1942; died 2003)
- Children: 3
- Relatives: Ben Blushi (grandson)

Mynever Shuteriqi (née Fico; 21 June 1924 – 20 November 2024) was an Albanian writer and academician. She was the wife of Albanian historian and author Dhimitër Shuteriqi.

== Early life ==
Mynever Fico was born in Gjirokastër on 21 June 1924. Her father worked as a forester. At the age of 2 she moved from Gjirokastër and lived in different cities in Albania, such as Lushnjë, Elbasan and Delvinë where she also learned the Greek language.

At the age of 17 she decided to join the partisans but was not accepted by the battalion because she was not yet 18, so she was arrested and imprisoned twice.

== Education ==
During the period of the 1940s she studied at Queen Mother Pedagogical Institute with other girls like Liri Belishova and Didi Bicaku. She learned there Italian and French language and took her first piano lessons. As well as the further desire to become a poet and a writer was born here.

== Career ==
After graduating from university, Shuteriqi became a lecturer in the journalism department in Tirana. She translated and published many volumes of novels and short stories in different languages and Albanian, especially her biographical books where she had to do with her memories.

== Personal life and death ==
In 1940, she met historian Dhimitër Shuteriqi and they married in Elbasan. They had three children, two daughters and a son. As two writers and intellectuals, they understood each other well in the path they had taken to continue life even though they were nine years apart. After the death of Dhimiter in 2003, Mynever published her autobiographical book with memories dedicated to her husband in 2008 called "Nje jete ne dashuri".

Mynever was the grandmother of Albanian politician and author Ben Blushi. She turned 100 on 21 June 2024, and died on 20 November.
