= History of education in Albania =

The History of education in Albania includes the cultural, civilizational, and educational thought of the Albanian populace at large. While authentic scientific inquiry into the history of education and Albanian educational philosophy emerged comparatively late, Albanian researchers have made noteworthy contributions. Studies and monographs conducted by these scholars, particularly those undertaken in the latter half of the 20th century through the early 21st century, have illuminated a range of facets pertaining to this subject.

== Antiquity ==
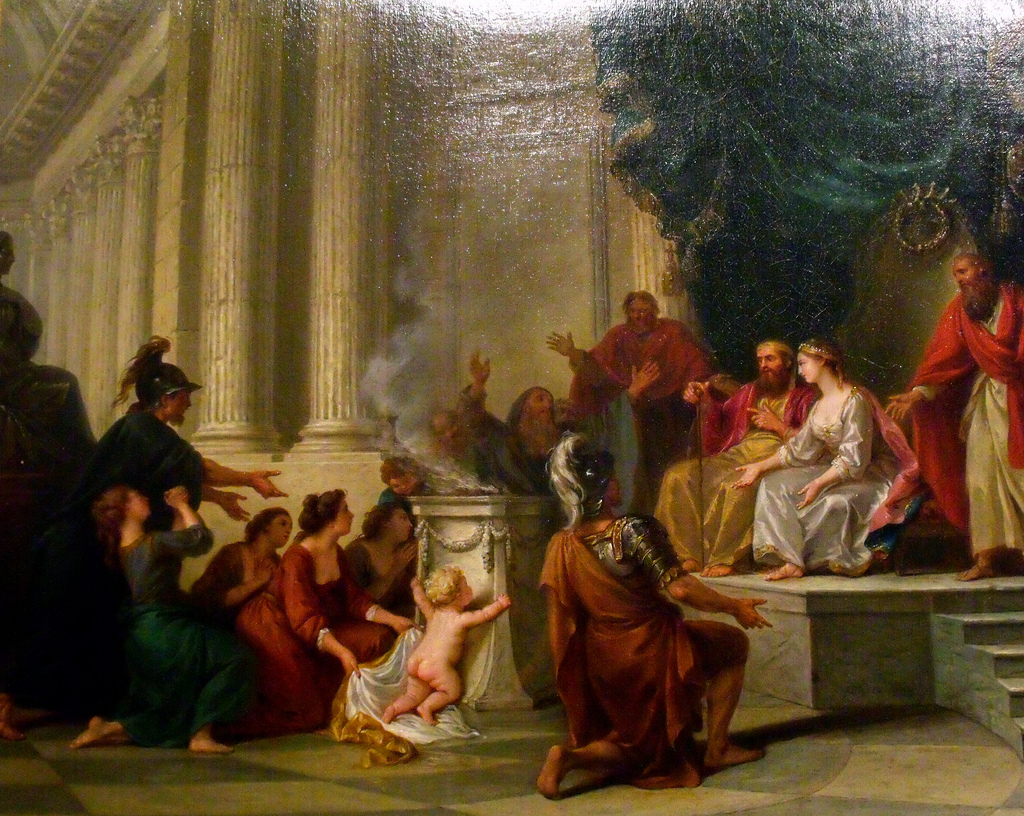
Pyrrhus, when a child, brought to Glaucias, king of Illyria and his wife Beroea for protection. There, at Glaucia's royal court and associated schools, Pyrrhus received an excellent upbringing and education of the time. (Painting by Nicolas René le Jeune Jollain - 1777)

The history of Albanian education can be traced back to the ancient Illyrian period. This phenomenon is inextricably linked to the evolution of urbanization and the proliferation of civilized societies in Illyrian regions, particularly during the period spanning from the 7th to the 6th centuries BC. The Illyrian culture and Greek ancient culture are recognized as pivotal in shaping the cultural foundation of European civilization.

To the Illyrians as well as to other ancient peoples, the main centers of organized activity became organized cities in the form of provincial communities known as koinons. Archaeological research proves the existence of the gymnasium in the Greek colony of Apollonia since the end of the 6th century BC. Later, gymnasiums and other educational institutions were opened in cities such as Amantia, Byllis, Durrës, Epidaurum, Nikaia, Historical evidence speaks of the Hellenistic School of Apollonia, in which in 44 Julius Caesar's nephew, Octavian Augustus, was also a student, probably because in this educational institution taught prominent scholars of the time. The school of Apollonia was a philosophical-rhetorical school in which students learned knowledge from fields such as philosophy, oratory (rhetoric), literature and language. The ancient Greek geographer and historian Strabo in his work Geographica describes it as "a city with good laws" (polis eunomotate). Even the Roman orator Cicero, who had visited these areas in 58 in his work Philipicae, described Apollonia as a "great and majestic city" (Latin: magna urbs et gravis) with a school of philosophy and oratory. The existence of libraries and stadiums has been proven in some Illyrian cities. In different historical periods, Greek and Roman educational institutions functioned in Illyria in which the children of the rich Illyrian strata attended classes.

== Middle Ages ==
In the early Middle Ages, prior to the Ottoman occupation, education in Albanian territories was largely influenced by the Church, specifically the Catholic Church in the northern regions and the Orthodox Church in the southern regions. It can be inferred that the Church had a predominant position in disseminating knowledge and nurturing intellectual growth during that time. In Catholic schools, the predominant language of culture and education was Latin-Italian, whereas in Orthodox schools, the languages of Greek and Slavic were commonly employed. The Albanian language did not have any educational institutions at the time. Albanian was not traditionally considered as a language commonly utilized for liturgical or cultural purposes.

The genesis of Albanian education can be traced back to the earliest iterations of the Albanian language's alphabetic systems and their acquisition and application in social and educational contexts. Scholarly accounts posit that the earliest recorded instances of written Albanian surfaced during the 12th century, at a time when Albanian principalities were prevalent, with the language's literary tradition gaining traction in the 15th century due to the growing influence of Albanian feudalists and the establishment of the University of Durrës (studium generale).

The utilization of foreign alphabets for the purposes of reading and writing in the Albanian language was initiated within religious schools where emphasis was placed on the study of foreign languages, namely Greek and Latin. Furthermore, such practices were necessitated by catholic and orthodox priests in the church during the XVI-XVII century. The inception of written Albanian language can be traced back to the fifteenth century, with the earliest known document being recorded during this period. However, it was not until 1555 that the first Albanian book, namely "Meshari" (Missal), made an appearance in the literary world. This seminal work was translated by Gjon Buzuku, signifying a significant milestone on the Albanian literary landscape.

== Ottoman period ==
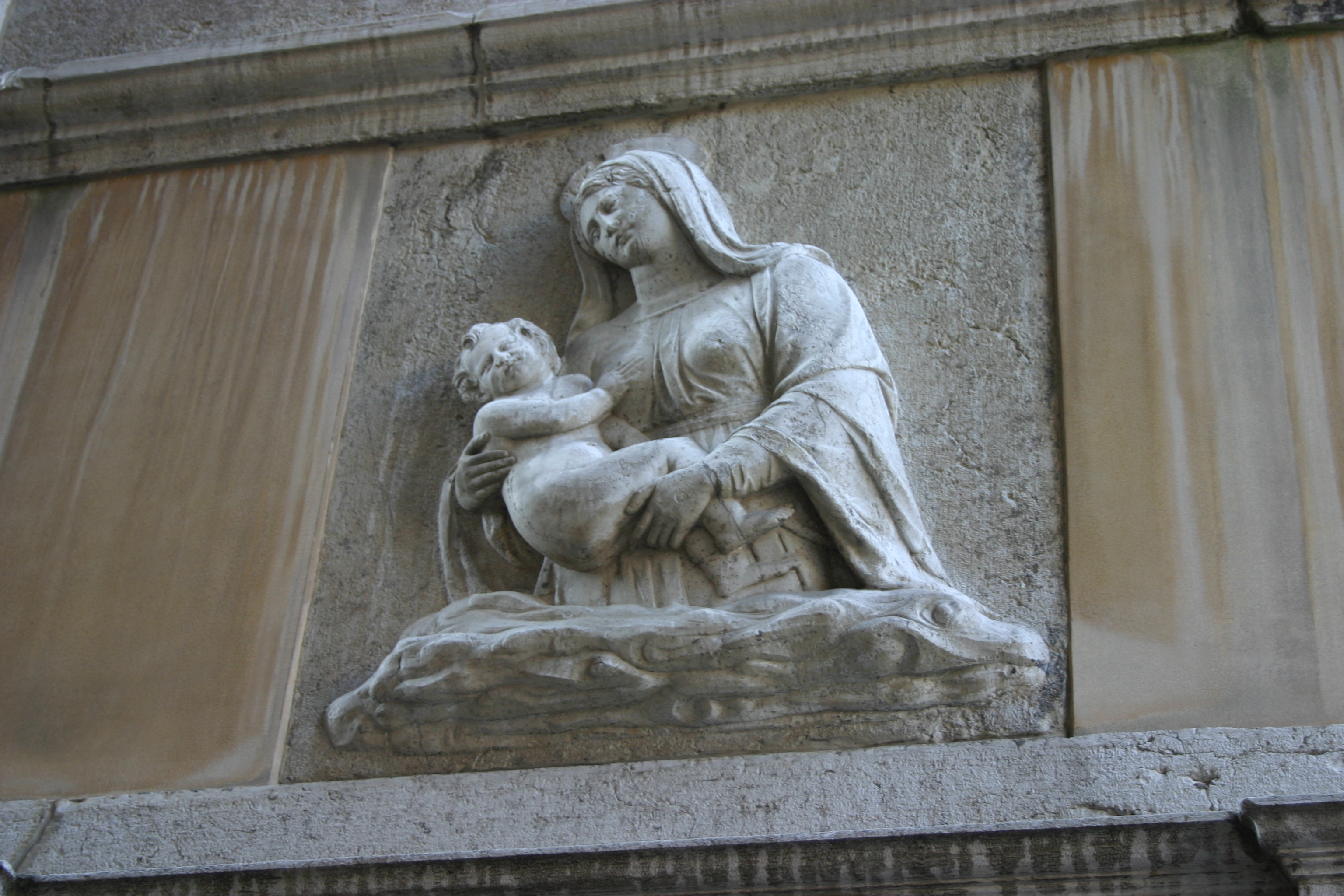
Renaissance relief on the facade of former Scuola degli Albanesi ("Guildhall of the Albanians"), in Campo San Maurizio square. Venezia - Italy

The advent of Ottoman occupation in the fifteenth century resulted in notable transformations in the religious, cultural, and educational landscapes of the Albanian populace. The Ottoman Empire founded educational institutions known as "maytaps" for the primary education of Muslim students, and "medresses" for the higher education of Muslim students. Schools provided education to Albanians who practised the Islamic faith. Several individuals achieved recognition as eminent academics within the Ottoman Empire's secondary education institutions, known as medresses. The Albanian Catholic humanists pursued their educational and scientific ventures overseas, primarily in Italian universities. Some of their notable members, including Marin Barleti (Barletius) and Nikollë Leonik Tomeu (Thomeaus), achieved distinguished recognition within the European education and cultural sphere.

During the Ottoman invasion of Albania, many Albanians migrated out of the area to escape either various socio-political and economic difficulties. Among them, the medieval painters Marco Basaiti and Viktor Karpaçi, sculptor and architect Andrea Nikollë Aleksi and art collector Alessandro Albani. Those who resided in the Venetian Empire established the Scuola degli Albanesi that served as a cultural and social center for Albanians.

== 17th–18th century ==
During the seventeenth and eighteenth centuries, there was a revitalization of both the economic and cultural domains. The sensation of a resurgence in Albanian ethnic identity occurred. During this period, the Pashalik of Shkodra and the Pashalik of Janina embarked on a mission to regenerate Albanian identity and pursue independence from the Ottoman Empire by emulating the prevailing European notions of civilization. This marked the inception of Albanian Enlightenment. A concerted effort was made to safeguard the Catholic and Orthodox faith, indigenous culture, and local heritage via a series of measures including the establishment of councils, educational institutions, translation of religious and secular texts, as well as the creation of original works in the Albanian language, such as the Albanian Monastery (Lezhë, Albania, 1703), and the Albanian College (Kalabria, Italy, 1732). The New Academy of Voskopoja, located in Albania in 1750, holds a position of notable significance despite the employment of Greek as the medium of instruction. Albanians who identified themselves as Muslims were deprived of their entitlement to receive education in their native language. However, numerous intellectuals demonstrated a strong sense of pride in their ethnic heritage. The individuals in question received their education within Ottoman educational institutions, wherein the utilization of Albanian language (composed in Arabic script) came to fruition during the 18th century. During the 17th and 18th centuries, Albanian educational ideology made significant progress, particularly with the publication of "Çeta e profetëve" (Cuneus Prophetarum) by Pjetër Bogdani in 1685, as well as the introduction of European educational practices facilitated by The New Academy of Voskopoja. The town of Voskopoja was noted for its notable contributions in the realm of intellectualism, particularly in the area of scientific inquiry, culture and education, such as Theodor Kavalioti (Kavalliotos), Theodhor Haxhifilipi etc.

The educational institutions of Catholic, Greek-Orthodox, and Ottoman affiliations within which Albanian youth received instruction, played a significant role in shaping the cultural and educational advancement of the Albanian populace. Within these academic institutions, prominent intellectuals and scholars of the Albanian National Renaissance were established, dedicating their efforts towards the advancement and preservation of the Albanian language and educational system. Within these academic institutions, Albanian educators began to teach the Albanian language surreptitiously to their pupils. They played a pivotal role in paving the way for the emergence of the national education system and the establishment of schools.

== National Renaissance ==
During the National Renaissance era, the Albanian people and intellectuals exhibited robust efforts towards the establishment and development of an Albanian national school, despite encountering various challenges and making countless sacrifices. This movement was spearheaded by prominent individuals such as Naum Veqilharxhi, who authored the first national ABC book in 1844, Jeronim de Rada, the first national teacher, and figures like Naim and Sami Frashëri, Hasan Tahsini, Pashko Vasa, and Kostandin Kristoforidhi among others. As pioneers and architects of the Albanian national educational system. The democratic illuminism espoused by the Renaissance figures was underpinned by the momentous concept of Albanianism, which, in turn, was founded on the Albanian school and the Albanian language as a medium for both instruction and learning, in addition to the promotion of national education. This event summoned a congregation of distinguished scholars and religious leaders with varying faith affiliations from across the nation. The Albanian League of Prizren petitioned for the acknowledgment of the Albanian language and the establishment of Albanian educational institutions. In the year 1879, a group of renowned Renaissance figures established the Society for the Printing of Albanian Letters in Istanbul, and established branch offices in various locations. Various associations and organizations held a significant position in the Albanian educational realm, as evidenced by their regular coverage in nationally circulated newspapers. In an effort to establish a standardized national alphabet, the individuals in question published various articles and magazines written in the Albanian language. Additionally, they published a notable work entitled "The ABC Book of the Albanian Language" which aimed to introduce the Albanian alphabet, particularly drawing from the Alphabet of Istanbul.

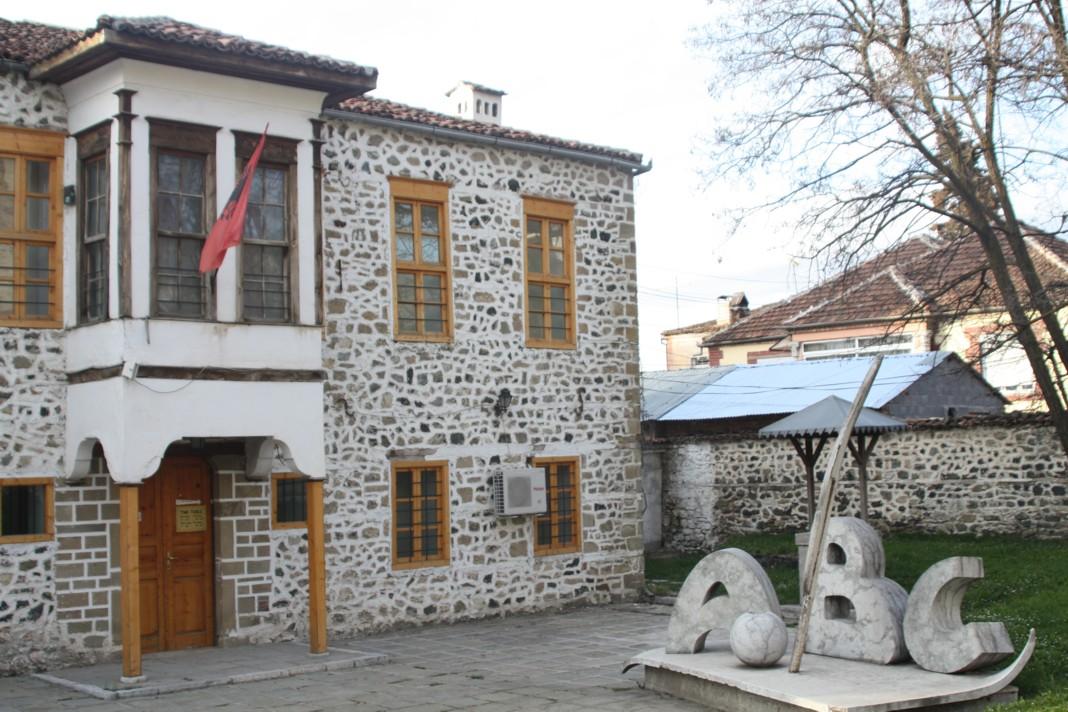
Courtyard of the First Albanian School Mësonjëtorja, in Korçë

The aforementioned materials include textbooks on the topic of "language", as well as various other educational resources that are written in the Albanian language. In 1881, the objectives of the individuals constituting the National Movement shifted primarily towards the preservation and promotion of the Albanian language, following the dissolution of the Albanian League of Prizren. The institution of education commonly referred to as "schooling" is a formalized system of learning and instruction designed to impart knowledge and develop skills in students. It typically involves a structured curriculum, set learning goals, and a system of assessment and evaluation. The aim of schooling is to prepare individuals for future academic, vocational, or personal pursuits, and to promote critical thinking, inquiry, and intellectual development. Consequently, the inception of the School of Korça (Mësonjëtorja e Korçës) in 1887, marked a significant milestone in Albanian education as it was deemed the first institution of its kind, serving as a prototype for the establishment of subsequent national schools. In 1899, Sami Frashëri authored a programmatic publication titled "What was, what is, and what will be Albania. ", wherein he espouses a comprehensive outlook for the national education system. This includes the delineation of its structure and principles.

The declaration of the Young Turks' Constitution in 1908 was utilized by Albanian nationalists as a means to enhance their endeavors in the realms of patriotism, politics, culture, and education. Novel clubs and associations were established within the territorial bounds of the country contributing substantially towards elevating the national consciousness across the four Albanian vilayets. The pinnacle achievements during this period were demonstrated by the Congress of Manastir in 1908, where official approval was given to the Albanian alphabet. Additionally, the Congress of Elbasan, the inaugural national educational congress, and the Teacher's Secondary School of Elbasan in 1909, the first of its kind in Albanian lands, marked notable advancements in secondary education and professional training in the Albanian language. Despite various attempts by Albanians to establish educational institutions, foreign schools, particularly Ottoman public schools, maintained a dominant presence in Albanian territories. The quantities of this particular group demonstrated substantial growth during both the nineteenth and twentieth centuries.

In pursuit of enhancing the proficiency and scholarly vigor of the national educational system, Renaissance luminaries addressed various theoretical concerns pertaining to a wide range of educational domains including general pedagogy, didactics, methodology, school pedagogy, family pedagogy, adult education, history of pedagogy, and pre-school pedagogy. During the Renaissance era, notable figures made significant contributions to the methodology used in the publication of textbooks, including the incorporation of Albanian terminology. The term "pedagogical-school" may be rendered in a more formal and scholarly style as a school focused on pedagogy, or alternatively, a school with an emphasis on educational theory and practice.

== Independence ==
The declaration of Albanian sovereignty in 1912 signified a pivotal moment in the progression of national education. The establishment of a dependable national educational framework within the territorial limits of Albania was facilitated by the creation of favorable conditions. Together with the fundamental tenets of the legal system, Albanian patriots spearheaded by the inaugural Minister of Albanian Education, Luigj Gurakuqi, aimed to extend the reach of Albanian schools and institute a nationwide approach to their administration. In contrast, the Albanian populace residing beyond the confines of Albania, predominantly within the borders of the Yugoslav Kingdom, were devoid of educational institutions, particularly those that catered to the use of their native language.

== World War I ==
Throughout World War I, a significant development took place in the territory occupied by Austria-Hungary as a number of Albanian schools were established for the first time. These schools were found in regions such as Kosova and other Albanian territories located beyond the borders of Albania, which had been demarcated in 1913. The Herbartian pedagogy, utilizing a foundation based on scientific principles, was implemented in educational institutions situated within Albanian territories under the jurisdiction of the Austro-Hungarian Empire.

== Interwar period ==
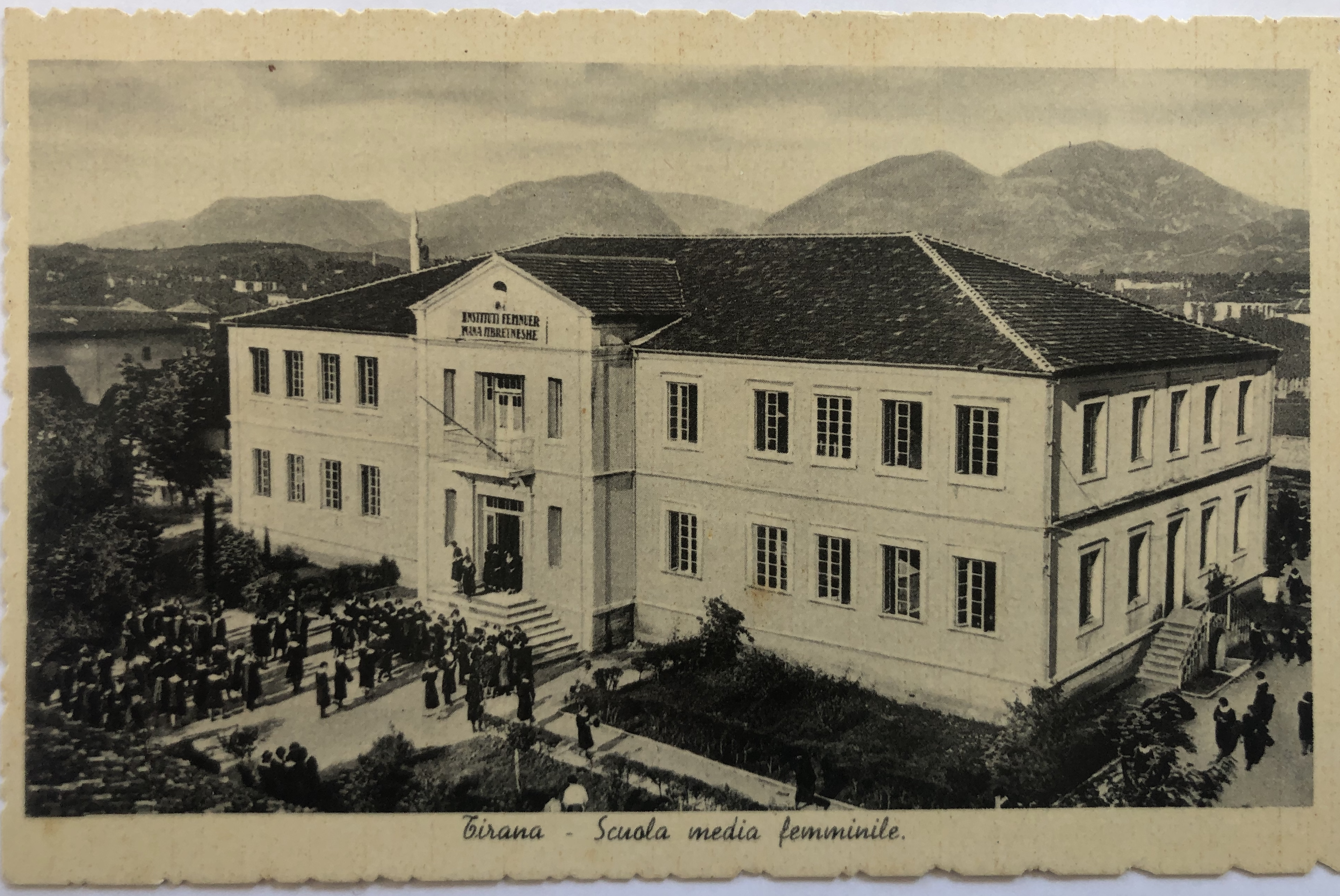
The Queen Mother Pedagogical Institute in 1939

During the Congress of Lushnja in 1920, the decision was made to establish a Department of Education within the Albanian state's Constitution. Subsequently, during the Congress of Education held in Lushnja and Tirana in 1922 and 1924, significant actions were taken towards the nationalization, democratization, and secularization of Albanian schools, as well as the compilation of pertinent educational documents. The chronological span of 1920 to 1939 in Albania was marked by the consolidation of the primary school and the establishment of a comprehensive national system of secondary education. Conversely, within Albanian territories under Yugoslavian rule, Albanians persevered in their efforts to secure Albanian language instruction and educational institutions, which were prohibited by Yugoslav authorities. In addition to the realm of education, Albania also experienced the emergence of educational-psychological thought, accompanied by diverse educational ideologies and a concerted effort to incorporate the principles of "the new school" into the Albanian educational system. Numerous magazines and educational-psychological writings were released during this period, among which were notable contributions in the field of pedagogy and psychology authored by Aleksandër Xhuvani, a prominent figure in Albanian education and psychology during the first half of the 20th century.

== World War II ==
During the historical period of the Second World War, Italian invaders introduced alterations to the education system of Albania, as well as to those within Yugoslavian Albanian regions. The Italian occupation of Kosova and other Albanian territories outside of Albania was deemed a "liberating" endeavor due to its provision of certain rights to the Albanian populace. Specifically, for the first time within the Yugoslav Kingdom, Albanians were afforded the right to education in their native language. Despite the intentions of the Italian conquerors to Italianize the education and school systems in the territories under their occupation, including both Albania and Kosova, it is evident that this marked the inception of a distinct Albanian educational system implemented on a national level representing ethnic Albania.

== Communism ==
A pivotal moment in the chronicles of Albanian education pertains to the transformation of the socialist society, which was invariably influenced by the Soviet experience and the Marxist–Leninist doctrine. During the period of extensive societal modifications in Albania, a comprehensive initiative was launched in the sphere of education. An education system which was comprehensive and non-sectarian in nature, was established, consisting of a vast network of early childhood education institutions, primary schools, as well as extensive and professional secondary schools. The introduction of tertiary education in Albania marked a significant milestone, with the establishment of universities and institutions of higher learning. The University of Tirana witnessed the graduation of more than 66,000 specialized professionals of diverse fields between its establishment in 1957 and the year 1987. During this time, there was a notable advancement in adult education, encompassing both pre-service and in-service training. The Socialist Republic of Albania was distinguished as one of the select nations that was able to eradicate illiteracy from its population. In the context of the totalitarian society, it is evident that Albanian educational thought underwent significant growth and progression, closely intertwined with the concurrent advancement of socialist education within Albania. The Marxist–Leninist ideology was identified and established as the sole methodological doctrine of the Albanian educational system and pedagogy.

== Contemporary ==
A reorganisation plan was announced in 1990 that would extend the compulsory education program from eight to ten years. The following year, however, a major economic and political crisis in Albania, and the ensuing breakdown of public order, plunged the school system into chaos. Widespread vandalism and extreme shortages of textbooks and supplies had a devastating effect on school operations, prompting Italy and other countries to provide material assistance. The minister of education reported in September 1991 that nearly one-third of the 2,500 schools below the university level had been ransacked and fifteen school buildings razed. Many teachers relocated from rural to urban areas, leaving village schools understaffed and swelling the ranks of the unemployed in the cities and towns; about 2,000 teachers fled the country. The highly controlled environment that the communist regime had forced upon the educational system over the course of more than forty-six years was finally liberated set for improvement.

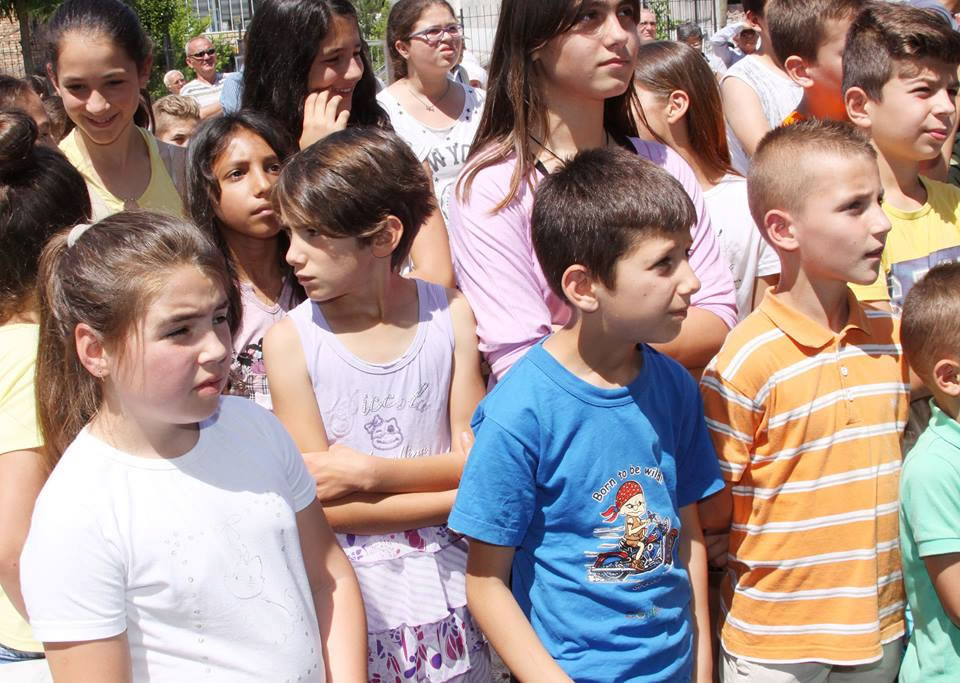
Young Albanian school children

As in Communism, teacher discipline remains a major problem in the Albanian education system, as teachers resort to violence, while students are expected to simply memorise the assigned material. Furthermore, corruption among teachers is becoming a problem as 'envelopes' and expensive gifts are the norm when faced with important deadlines, such as entry averages, or failing the grade. However, there has been an effort to adopt the Western model whereby the student is at the centre of the education system as opposed to the current Eastern model where the teacher holds the dominant role.

In the late 1990s, many schools were rebuilt or reconstructed to improve learning conditions through the Soros Open Society Foundations. Most of the improvements have happened in the larger cities, such as the capital Tirana. The latter suffers from vast overcrowding of classrooms, resulting in 2 daytime teaching shifts, while heating during the winter is a major problem. The old communist propaganda has been taken out of all school curricula and more emphasis has been put on mathematics, sciences and humanities. The school week was shortened from 6 to a 5-day week. Some of the wealthier schools have begun introducing computers, but many schools still lack basic supplies for laboratory classes.

Meanwhile, private, non-public institutions across all levels have opened up with improved teaching material, staff, and added extra curricular activities but expensive fees. Similar changes have also taken place in the post-secondary level. A number of private universities have been established in different cities of Albania, offering students possibilities of studying in different branches. E-learning programs have begun to be introduced, offering students the possibility of following online courses. However, some post-secondary private institutions have become known as simply "diploma factories", as was the case with the granting of a controversial university diploma to the son of famous Italian politician Umberto Bossi. As a result, the Albanian government has closed a dozen of such institutions in an attempt to clamp down on the phenomenon.

Between 2009 and 2013, the textbook industry was deregulated in an effort to make textbooks more affordable thus offering a wider choice to students and instructors. However, the sector became vulnerable to favouritism and the Albanian education system experienced a decline in quality. It became flooded with texts written by writers without credible credentials resulting in mediocre texts with dubious content. One of them featured a story about mixing chalk with water and drinking it to become ill and skip classes. A physics textbook required students to find the colour of a bear, which was chasing a human up a tree. Other texts made explicit use of profanity.

Since 2013, the above texts were banned and more reputable ones from Pearson and Oxford were introduced in an effort to harmonise the Albanian education system with the EU. In addition, students between grades 1 to 5 are provided with free textbooks.

In the winter of 2018–19, student protests took place in Tirana to demand better education infrastructure, slash tuition fees, and denounce favouritism, corruption, and sexual favours among teaching staff. The government accepted the demands, and student dorms at Student City in Tirana are being reconstructed as part of the University Pact between the government and public academic institutions in Albania.

In recent years, foreign students mainly from Southern Italy are getting enrolled in Italian-affiliated universities in Tirana in the hope of better preparing for entrance exams in Italy's universities.

The educational pursuit of Albanians residing beyond their native region has been a distinctive module of the Albanian educational and pedagogical heritage. This pertains to the enduring aims of preserving the national language and heritage, as well as the educational undertakings within the diaspora.

== See also ==
- History of Albania
- University of Tirana
- Education in Albania
