= Gjirokastër Obelisk =

Monument in Albania

Coordinates: 40°4′28″N 20°8′17″E

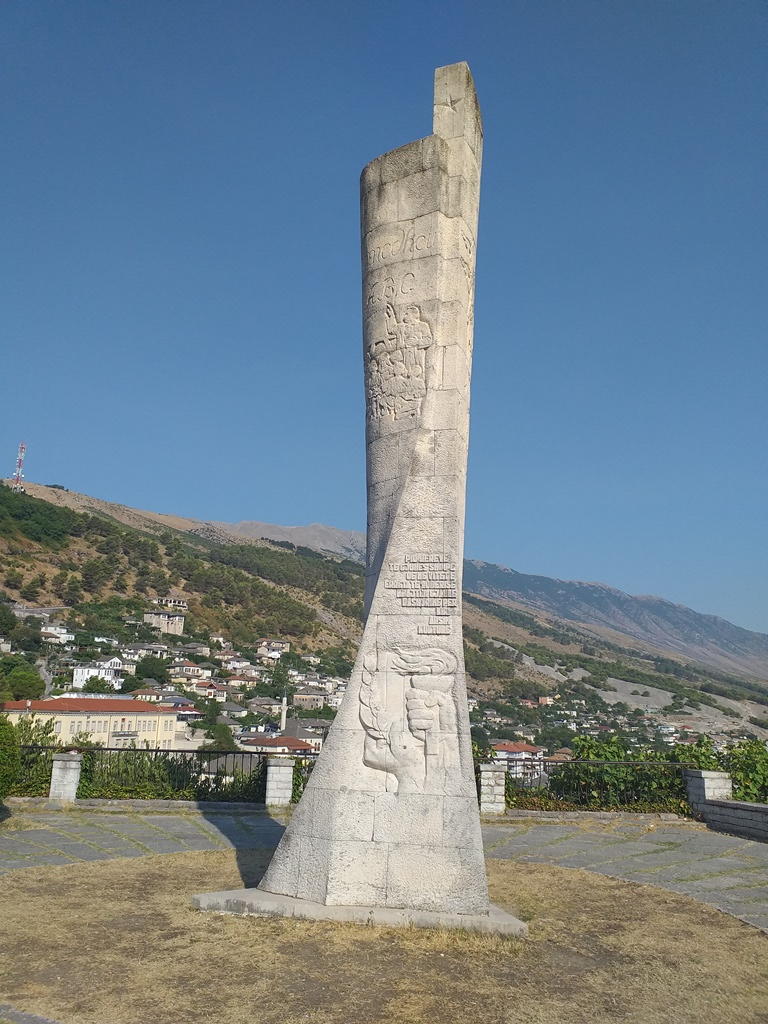
Gjirokastër Obelisk

Gjirokastër Obelisk or Mëmëdheu ABC is an obelisk monument in Gjirokastër, Albania, and celebrates the Albanian language. The obelisk is located in the highest peak of the city of Gjirokastër near the first Albanian school to be opened in the town in 1908 and is a symbol for education in Albania. The monument is 7 m high, and is built with hewn stone from 124 block stones.

The authors of the obelisk are Muntaz Dhrami, Ksenofon Kostaqi, and Stefan Papamihali, who were all awarded the prize "Honor of the City of Gjirokaster" in 2008 from the Municipality of Gjirokastër for their artistic work for the city.
