= Dëftesë =

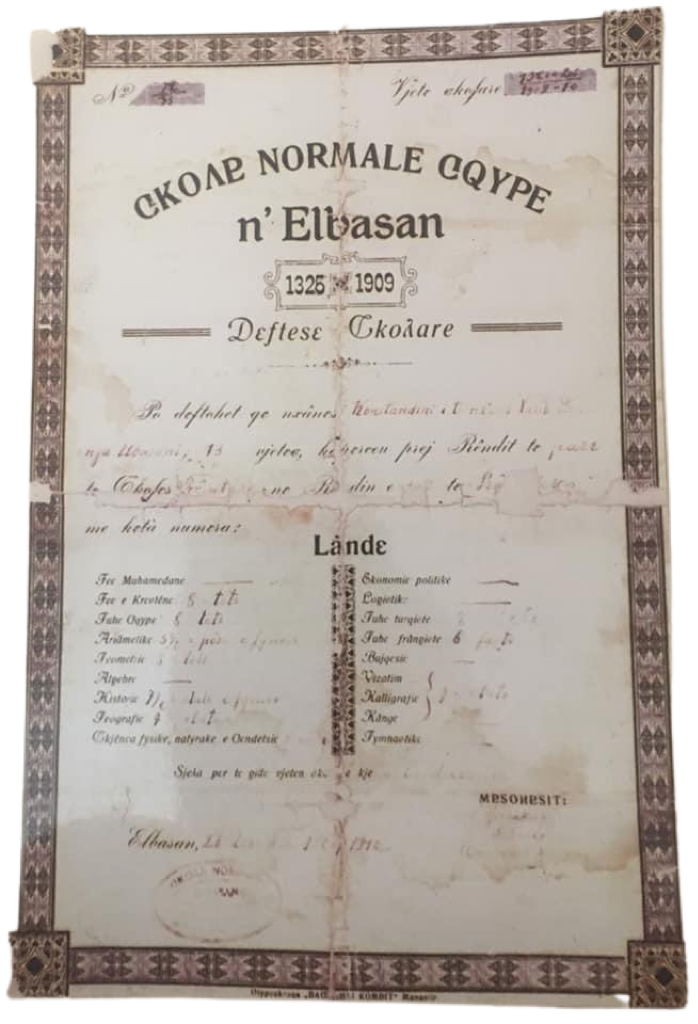
- A dëftesë issued by the Normal School of Elbasan
- Created: 1909
- Location: Albania
- Commissioned by: Ministry of Education
- Signatories: School Principal
- Media type: Print, Digital
- Subject: Educational
- Purpose: To certify a student's grades during a school year

In the Republic of Albania, a Dëftesë (lit. "Certificate") is an official document in the form of a certificate issued to a student by the school upon completion of their grades. The Ministry of Education is the accredited institution in giving out this document.

== Etymology ==
The word dëftesë in the Albanian language is the noun form of the passive verb dëftoj, meaning to show, demonstrate or indicate. Its origin can possibly be traced to the Ottoman Turkish word defter, which was a type of tax register.

== Usage ==
A dëftesë is an official document issued to a student by the school, which summarizes in record the classes they completed, the final grades, etc. The most common type of dëftesë issued today is known as Dëftesë Pjekurie (Maturation Certificate).

== Types ==
- Dëftesë Shkollore – Standard school certificate, issued for the first time at the Normal School of Elbasan.
- Dëftesë Semimature – Certificate of semi-graduation, issued in the late 1920s during the period of the Albanian Republic.
- Dëftesë Maturiteti – Certificate of graduation, same as above.
- Dëftesë Lirimi – Certificate of release (from training class), issued during the period of the Albanian Kingdom and continually during the fascist occupation.
- Dëftesë Komunikate – Communication certificate, a type of judgement letter issued by the courts during the period of the Albanian Kingdom.
- Dëftesë Pjekurie – Maturation certificate, issued since the 1930s to students who completed high school education.
- Dëftesë Vjetore – Yearly certificate, issued in the 1930s by Instituti Femnuer "Nana Mbretneshë".
