= Drita Çomo =

Albanian poet (1958–1981)

Drita Çomo (Tiranë, March 19, 1958 - February 19, 1981) was an Albanian poet.

== Biography ==
She was born on March 19, 1958, in Tirana, the daughter of Maqo Çomo and Liri Belishova, both prominent communist figures who had held important roles during and after the National Liberation Movement in Albania. At the age of two, in 1960, together with her mother they were interned in Kuç near Vlorë. After the Soviet-Albanian split, both her parents were accused of spying for the Soviet Union against the Party of Labour.

After being interned in Kuç, they moved to Progonat, and later to Cërrik while her father, Maqo Çomo, a former partisan commander and later Minister of Agriculture, was sentenced to 30 years in prison.

During the internment in Cërrik, Drita managed to complete high school, but due to progressive cancer she was unable to take her final graduation exams.

== Literary work ==
In the last years of her life, she kept a diary that documented the daily realities of living in a place of isolation. She also left behind dozens of poems, written between 1975 and 1981, reflecting a story of suffering, pain, and the profound enchantments of youth.

"Freedom is one of the most expensive possessions that heaven could have given to people. All the treasures that are hidden in the depths of the earth and in the depths of the sea cannot be compared to it."

A collection of her works was presented in Tirana on the twentieth anniversary of her death.

== Death ==
In 1981, her health worsened. Liri Belishova, her mother, had written several letters to the wife of dictator and former close friend Nexhmije Hoxha to be able and visit her daughter in the hospital, but she never received an answer.

She died at the age of 23 at the Oncology Hospital in Tirana. She died alone and without being allowed to have her mother by her side.

== See also ==
- Communism in Albania
- Liri Belishova
