= Ramize Gjebrea =

Albanian partisan (1923–1944)

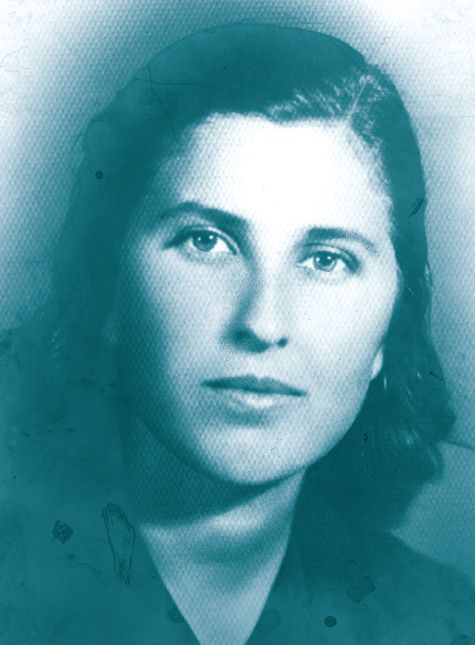
Ramize Gjebrea

Ramize Gjebrea (April 20, 1923 – March 6, 1944, nom de guerre Ramona) was an Albanian World War II partisan, accused of alleged immoral behavior by a martial court, and executed by a firing squad in the village of Ramicë, Vlorë.

== Biography ==
Gjebrea was born on April 20, 1923, in the city of Gjirokastër to a father from the well-known local Gjebrea family, which makes her related to Ardit Gjebrea and a mother from Kaçanik, Kosovo. She had gone to the Mother Queen Women's Institute, where she had studied along with Nexhmije Hoxha, and Liri Belishova. She later was arrested in 1942, but freed for lack of proof, and subsequently joined the National Liberation Movement, first as a youth secretary of Berat, and then as commanding staff of the 5th Attacking Brigade.

=== Investigation for immoral behavior, trial and death ===
On February 16, 1944 an investigation for immoral behavior and breach of the partisan morals took place in Ramicë, Vlorë. According to the verbals of the investigation, partisan Zaho Koka, a former shephard, and Gjebrea admitted only to having kissed and fondled one another, whereas Ramadan Xhangolli, envoy of the Central Committee of the Communist Party of Albania, accused them of having had intercourse. Zaho Koka claimed that he didn't know that at the time of the facts Gjebrea was the fiancée of Nako Spiru. On March 4, 1944 the court condemned Gjebrea to death, but pardoned Koka, although it demoted him within the Party. Gjebrea was executed two days later on March 6, 1944, in front of 400 partisans of the 5th Attacking Brigade. All three partisans—two male and one female—shot their first bullet into the air. At that point Gjebrea yelled at them "Don't shoot me on the back. I expect your bullets to be different. Shoot at me!", at which point they shot at her, and Gjebrea fell, dead.

Liri Belishova, who later became the wife of Nako Spiru, witnessed in a 2010 interview that the martial court followed the order by Enver Hoxha to execute Gjebrea. According to Belishova, the order of Hoxha was based on recommendations of Dusan Mugosa, envoy of Josip Broz Tito to assist the Albanian National Liberation Movement. She also said that Gjebrea had an intelligence and eloquence that was unmatched by other Albanian women involved in the National Liberation Army, and that before joining the National Liberation Army she had been the only woman to participate in the actions of the city guerillas.

In December 2013, "Shqiptarja" magazine published for the first time the personal diary of Gjebrea.
