= Dhimitër Shuteriqi =

Albanian historian (1915–2003)

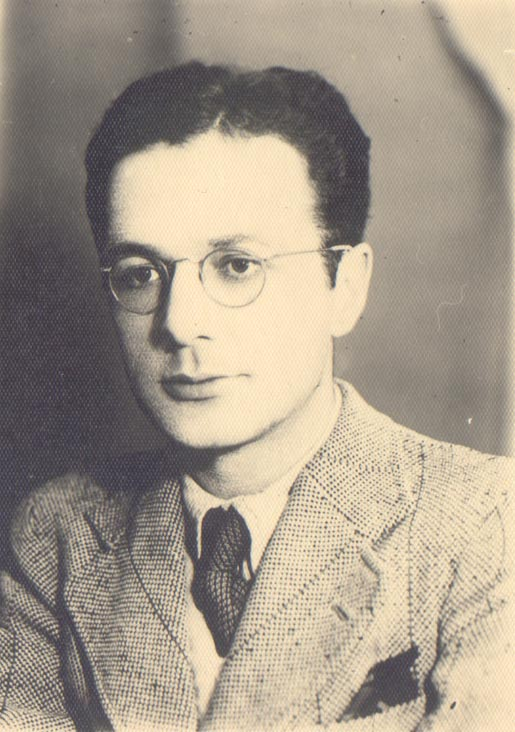
- Shuteriqi in 1937
- Born: Dhimitër Simon Shuteriqi; 26 July 1915; Elbasan, Principality of Albania
- Died: 22 July 2003 (aged 87); Tirana, Albania
- Education: Université Grenoble Alpes
- Spouse: Mynever Fiasco (m. 1942)
- Children: 3
- Parent: Simon Shuteriqi (Father)
- Relatives: Ben Blushi (Grandson)

Dhimitër Shuteriqi (26 July 1915 ‒ 22 July 2003) was an Albanian scholar, literary historian, and writer. He participated in the anti-fascist National Liberation Movement. After the war, he was a member of the People's Assembly and one of the founders and later president of the Albanian League of Writers and Artists. In addition to a series of books and novels, he has published numerous volumes of textbooks, especially those on the history of Albanian literature for high schools.

== Life ==
Dhimitër S. Shuteriqi was born in Elbasan in a patriotic and intellectual family. His father was Simon Shuteriqi, participant in the Literary Congress of Monastir (1908) and Congress of Elbasan (1909), as well as one of the founders of the Shkolla Normale e Elbasanit.

Shuteriqi attended the secondary school in Korça. He studied at the University of Grenoble and Lyon in France and taught school in Elbasan in 1942–1943. Shuteriqi began writing in the 1930s and was to become an influential literary historian during the socialist period. He was a member of parliament for many years, president of the Albanian League of Writers and Artists (ALWA) from 1950 to 1973, and a member of the Academy of Sciences from 1973. As chairman of the ALWA, he participated in the Albanian Congress of Orthography of 1972 and was one of the signatories. Shuteriqi is remembered for his research in literature, history, and folklore, in particular for his standard histories and anthologies of Albanian literature. Among his works are Shkrimet shqipe në vitet 1332–1850 (Albanian Writing in the Years 1332–1850), Tirana 1976, Autorë dhe tekste (Authors and Texts), Tirana 1977, and Historia e letërsisë shqiptare (History of Albanian Literature), Tirana 1983.

Shuteriqi was also author of prose and poetry. His first poetry was named Kosova and was published in the Kosova newspaper of Albanian community of Constanța, Romania, in 1933. He was inspired by Romanticism (Victor Hugo, Lamartine, De Vigny, Byron, etc.) until 1943 when he switched to Realism, and later Socialist Realism.

His two-volume Çlirimtarët (The Liberators), Tirana 1952 and 1955, the first post-World War II Albanian novel, painted a picture of the squalor and sufferings of the peasants before the "liberation", and also of the rise of class consciousness among them. It helped set the rather sluggish pace of socialist realism in the 1950s.

== Personal life and death ==
In 1940, Shuteriqi met writer Mynever Fisco and they married in Elbasan. They had three children, two daughters and a son. As two writers and intellectuals, they understood each other well in the path they had taken to continue life even though they were 9 years apart.

Shuteriqi was the grandfather of Albanian politician and author Ben Blushi.

He died in Tirana, on 22 July 2003, at the age of 87.

== Works ==
- Këngët e rinisë së parë (Songs of first youth), Tirana, 1935
- Historia e letërsisë shqipe në tre vëllime (History of Albanian literature in three volumes), Tirana, 1959, OCLC 504188502
- Metrika shqipe për shkollat e mesme dhe të nalta (Albanian metrics for high schools and universities), Pristina, 1968, OCLC 504188538
- The lute and the rifle, Tirana, 1965, OCLC 29799716 (translated by Ali Cungu)
- Mbi krahn' e praruar të paqës. Poem dhe vjersha të tjera (Over the golden wings of peace), Tirana, 1950, OCLC 504188548
- Récits, Tirana, 1969, OCLC 25242468
- Antologjia e letërsisë shqipe për shkollat e mesme (Anthology of Albanian literatury for high schools), Tirana, 1955, OCLC 792785485, Pristina, 1970, OCLC 42419307
- Shkrimet shqipe në vitet 1332–1850 (Albanian Writing in the Years 1332–1850), Tirana, 1976, OCLC 4167459
- Mësuesit dhe Atit: Poezi dhe prozë shqipe kushtuar emrit të J.V.Stalinit (To the teacher and father: Poetry and prose dedicated to the name of J.V.Stalin) (as editor), Tirana, 1953, OCLC 468906251
- Vepra (Work), as editor, author: Andon Zako, Tirana, 1957, OCLC 557917931
- Sytë e Simonidës : pluhurat e shenjtëruar (The eyes of Simonida: the holy dusts), Tirana, 1998, OCLC 41002334
- Tekstet shqipe dhe shkrimi i shqipes në vitet 879–1800 (Albanian text and writing of Albanian language in the years 879–1800), Tirana, 2005, ISBN 9789994381708
- Këngë në minierë : tregime dhe përshkrime (Songs in the mines: stories and narrations), Tirana, 1968, OCLC 23925590
- Naim Frashëri, jeta dhe vepra (Naim Frashëri, life and work), Tirana, 1982, OCLC 23767244
- Aranitët (Aranites), Tirana, 2011, ISBN 9789994317295 (Prepared by Zana Shuteriqi Prela)
- Marin Beçikemi dhe shkrime të tjera (Marin Beçikemi and other writings), Tirana, 1987, OCLC 28931320
- Le Chant et le fusil. (Récits), Tirana, 1963, OCLC 32411583
- Maratonomaku ynë : tregime (Our Maratonian : stories), Tirana, 1977, OCLC 18981763
- Çlirimtarët (Liberators), Tirana, 1952, 1955
- Ura në Tepelenë (Bridge in Tepelena), Pristina, 1979, OCLC 17274535
- Autorë dhe tekste (Authors and Texts), Tirana, 1977, OCLC 15286239
- Deshmi parabuzukjane të fjalës shqipe (Pre-Buzukian testimonies of Albanian words), Tirana, 2010, ISBN 978-99956-10-39-5
- Këngë (Songs), Tirana, 1961, OCLC 36250360
- Petro Korçari, kryearkitekt i Ali Pashë Tepelenës (Petro Korçari, chief-architect of Ali Pashe Tepelena), Tirana, 1978, OCLC 18107084
- Shpati i Sipërm: gjurmime rreth kulturës popullore (Shpati i Sipërm: research on the folkloric culture), (as co-author), Tirana, 1987, OCLC 18588537
- Gjurmime letrare (Literary research), Tirana, 1974, OCLC 54162415
- Vërshimet e vjeshtës (Autumn floods), Tirana, 1984, OCLC 18225289
- Nga kënga e popullit (From people's song), Tirana, 1991, OCLC 40498914
- Buka dhe thika: tregime të zgjedhura (Bread and knife: selected stories), Tirana, 2002, ISBN 9789992750094
- Si atë ditën e parë: poezi (Like that first day: poetry), Tirana, 1984, OCLC 18224377
- Rruga e Rinise (Youth's way), Tirana, 1953, OCLC 43138928
- Nëpër shekujt letrarë : studime (Through the literary centuries: studies), Tirana, 1973, OCLC 24372993
- Moti i madh: përmbledhje shënimesh e dokumentesh për historinë shqiptare të viteve 1379–1479 (The big year: collection of notes and documents for the Albanian history of years 1379–1479), Tirana, 2006, ISBN 9789992759967
- Poezia shqipe: nga origjinat e gjer më sot (Albanian poetry: from its origin till today), Tirana, 1965, OCLC 43143845
- Një mal me këngë (A mountain of songs), Tirana, 1975, OCLC 5733202
- Kënga dhe pushka: tregime (Song and rifle: stories), Tirana, 1963, OCLC 28785438
- Te qafa e botës: tregime (At the neck of the world: stories), Tirana, 1986, OCLC 17769145
- Gurnecka: tregime (Gurnecka: stories), Tirana, 1957, OCLC 660244021
- Fyelli i Marsiasit, dhe tregime të tjera (Marsias flute and other stories), Tirana, 1953, OCLC 80732707
- Kur rendte hëna nëpër re: tregime (When the moon was hovering through the clouds: stories), Tirana, 1982, OCLC 157033085
- Pesë tregime (Five stories), Tirana, 1953, OCLC 252881071
- Historia e letërsisë shqiptare: që nga fillimet deri te Lufta Antifashiste Nacionalçlirimtare (History of Albanian literature: from the start till the National Liberation Anti-Fascist War) (as co-author), Tirana, 1983, OCLC 14167733
- 60 tregime ne nje (60 stories in one), Tirana, 1979, OCLC 832605712
- Mbi Barletin dhe shkrime të tjera (On Barleti and other writings), Tirana, 1979, OCLC 63333127
- Andon Zako-Çajupi – biography (conference material), Tirana, 1950, OCLC 52763695

== See also ==
- Skënder Luarasi
- Robert Shvarc
- Sejfulla Malëshova
