= V.I. Lenin Higher Party School =

1945 establishments in Albania

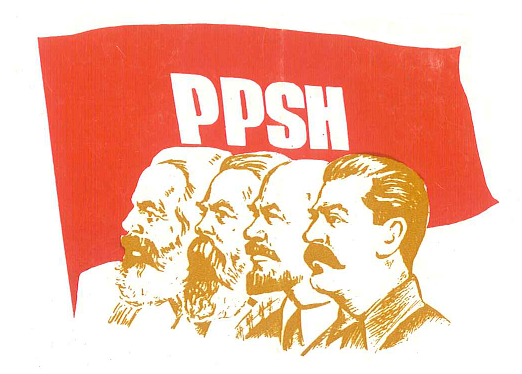
Symbol of the en:Party of Labour of Albania

The Vladimir Ilich Lenin Higher Party School (Albanian: Shkolla e Lartë e Partisë “V.I. Lenin”) was a university-level education institution that existed in Albania during the period of Communist rule. It was founded on August 11, 1945, and closed in 1991. The school was accessible to all who had finished high school education. Many of the students were already graduates in other fields in other institutions of higher education in Albania. In addition to a high school education, the other criterion for admission was loyalty to the Party. The studies lasted two years, without having to face exams or other academic testing, nor a final thesis or exam whatsoever. All the classes were about Marxist-Leninist theory, Communist Party history and similar.

The last Director (Rector, Chancellor) of the School was Nexhmije Hoxha, the widow of Enver Hoxha, the dictator of Albania from 1944 until 1985, his death. Nexhmije herself was without a formal higher education, because there were no universities in Albania until the communist period. Previous directors included Fiqrete Shehu, the wife of long-time prime minister Mehmet Shehu.

Students were given a two-year scholarship (the duration of the studies) of 800 Albanian lek per month. This was twice the salary of a factory worker and thrice the salary of a peasant worker. For the duration of their studies, the students were given free student housing for themselves and family.

== See also ==
- List of universities in Albania
