= Fiqrete Shehu =

Albanian politician

Fiqrete Shehu-Sanxhaktari

Personal details
- Born: 17 November 1919 Berat, Albania
- Died: 11 September 1988 (aged 68) Zejmen, Albania
- Party: Party of Labour of Albania
- Spouse: Mehmet Shehu

Fiqrete Shehu (née Sanxhaktari; 17 November 1919 – 11 September 1988) was an Albanian politician during the Communist Era. She was the wife of former Prime Minister Mehmet Shehu.

== Biography ==
She was born on 17 November 1919. Shehu was a member of the General Council of the Party of Labour of Albania from April 1952. She also served as Director of the Political V.I. Lenin Higher Party School (Albanian: Shkolla e Lartë e Partisë "V.I. Lenin") in Tirana.

After the death of her husband, Mehmet Shehu, in 1981, she was tried and convicted of being an agent of multiple foreign intelligence services, and was imprisoned and later interned with her family. Shehu died in internment on 11 September 1988. She was buried in the cemetery of the prison near Zejmen (Lezhë District). Her body was retrieved after 1990 by her family.

== See also ==
- Liri Belishova
- Nexhmije Hoxha
