= Bufi =

Bufi is a surname. Notable people with the surname include:

- Aldo Bufi Landi (1923–2016), Italian film actor
- Ylli Bufi (born 1948), Albanian politician
