= Ndue Paluca =

Albanian politician (born 1966)

Member of the Albanian parliament
- In office 2009–2013

Personal details
- Party: Democratic Party

Ndue Paluca (born 28 February 1966, in Pukë) was a member of the Parliament of the Republic of Albania for the Democratic Party of Albania.
