= Education in Albania =

Ministry of Education
- Minister of Education: Ogerta Manastiriliu

General details
- Primary languages: Albanian
- System type: Central

Literacy (2001)
- Total: 98.7
- Primary: 274,233
- Secondary: 377,936

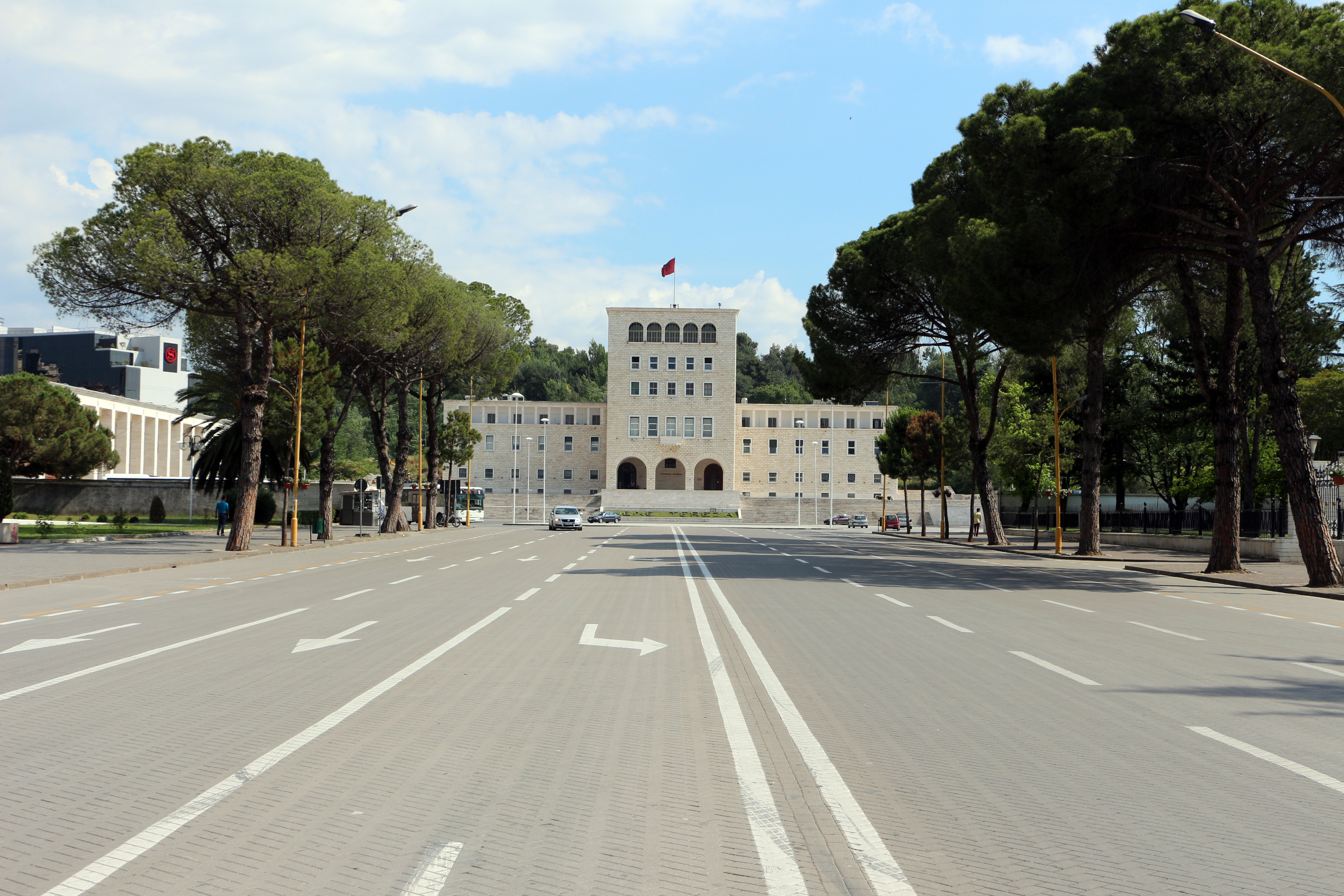
Polytechnic University of Tirana

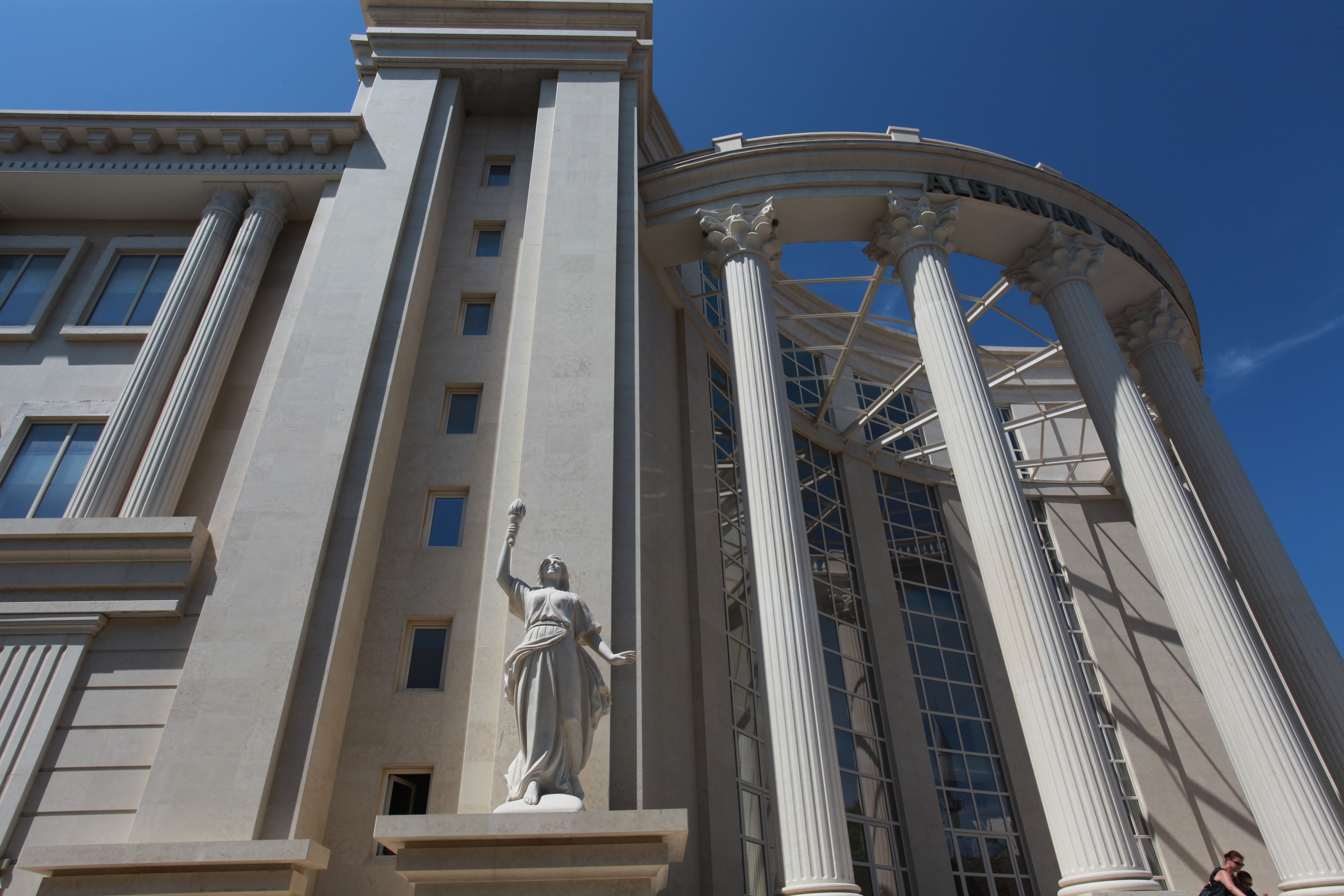
Albanian College of Durrës

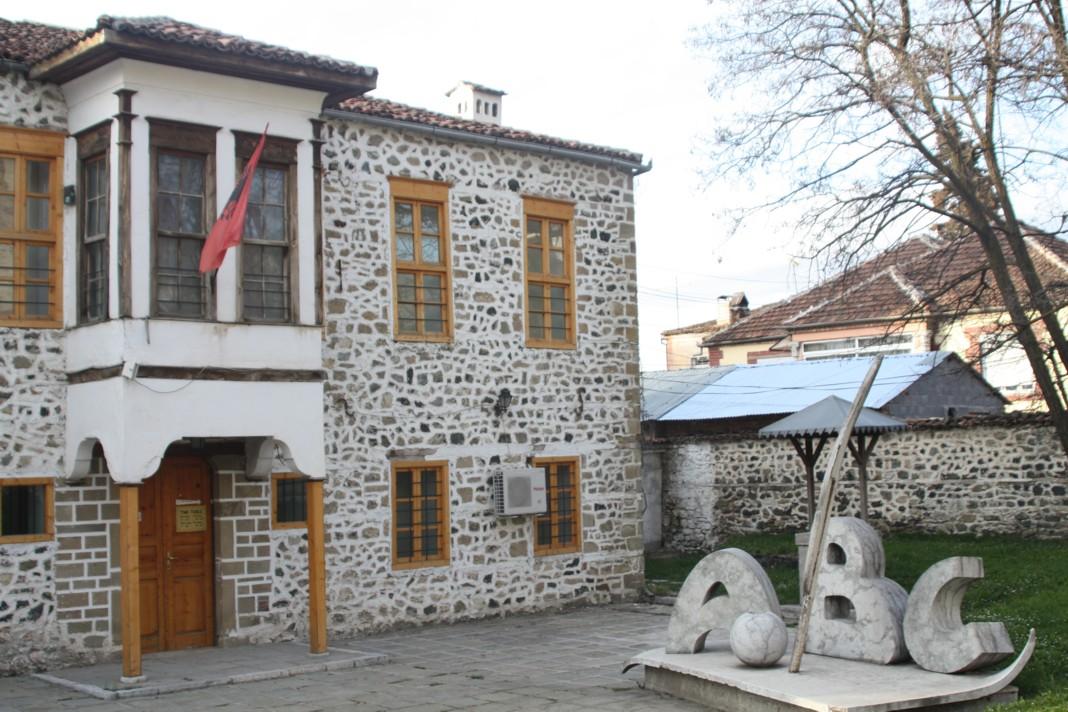
The Mësonjëtorja was the first Albanian language school to be established in Ottoman Albania

Education in Albania for primary, secondary, and tertiary levels are mostly supported by the state. The academic year is much similar to that as in the United States, classes starts almost in September or October and end in June or July. Albanian is the language of instruction in all public schools. The education takes place in three stages such as the primary, secondary, and pre-university education. There are about 5000 schools throughout the nation.

Elementary education is compulsory from years 1 to 9, but most students continue at least until a secondary education. Students must pass the graduation exams at the end of the 9th year and also at the end of the 12th year in order to continue their education. The academic year is divided into two semesters. The school week begins on Monday and ends on Friday.

The 'School life expectancy (primary to tertiary education)' of Albania is 16 years. The nation ranks 25th out of 167 countries. In 2015, the overall literacy rate in Albania was 98.7%; the male literacy rate was 99.2% and female literacy rate was 98.3%.

The Human Rights Measurement Initiative (HRMI) finds that Albania is fulfilling only 87.4% of what it should be fulfilling for the right to education based on the country's level of income. HRMI breaks down the right to education by looking at the rights to both primary education and secondary education. While taking into consideration Albania's income level, the nation is achieving 86.3% of what should be possible based on its resources (income) for primary education and 88.5% for secondary education.

== Pre-communist period ==
As late as 1945, the literacy rate of the country was raised to about 40%, and in late 1946 the illiteracy rate was 60%. This low percentage was principally because schools using the Albanian language had been practically very low in numbers in the country before it became officially independent in 1912. That is because Albanians didn't feel the need of a mass education in their language in the schools system due to them being mostly employed as officials and mercenaries/soldiers in the Ottoman Empire and also due to Albanian tribalism.

However, during the second half of the nineteenth century, especially during certain periods in Abdul Hamid II period, the Ottoman rulers had prohibited the use of the Albanian language in schools. Ottoman Turkish was spoken in the few schools that served the Muslim population. These institutions were located mainly in cities and large towns. The schools for Orthodox Christian children were under the supervision of the Ecumenical Patriarchate of Constantinople. The teachers at these schools usually were recruited from the Orthodox clergy, and the language of instruction was Greek. The first school known to use Albanian in modern times was a Franciscan seminary that opened in 1861 in Shkodër, though there are mentions of Albanian schools by Franciscans since 1638 in Pdhanë.

From about 1880 to 1910, several Albanian patriots intent on creating a sense of national consciousness founded elementary schools in a few cities and towns, mostly in the south, numbering to a dozen, but these institutions were closed by the Ottoman authorities in 1905 due to the Sultan Abdul Hamid II being scared this might have triggered an Albanian separation from the Ottoman Empire. The advent of the Young Turks movement in 1908 motivated the Albanian patriots to intensify their efforts, and in the same year a group of intellectuals met in Monastir to choose an Albanian alphabet. Books written in Albanian before 1908 had used a mixture of alphabets, consisting mostly of combinations of Latin, Greek, and Turkish-Arabic letters.

The participants in the Monastir meeting developed a unified alphabet based on Latin letters. A number of textbooks soon were written in the new alphabet, and Albanian elementary schools opened in various parts of the country. In 1909, to meet the demand for teachers able to teach in the native tongue, a normal school was established in Elbasan. But in 1910, the Young Turks, fearing the emergence of Albanian nationalism, closed all schools that used Albanian as the language of instruction.

Even after Albania became independent, schools were few in numbers. The unsettled political conditions caused by the Balkan Wars and by World War I hindered the development of a unified education system. When World War I broke out (1914), Albanian education in Albania was scarce. Apart from the Ottoman educational institutions, the local schools were mostly Greek- and a few Aromanian- speaking:

| Language | Schools | Regions |
|---|---|---|
| Greek | 150 (20.000 students) | mostly in the country's south |
| Romanian | 20 | Korçë region |
| Serbian | 1 | Shkodra region |

The foreign occupying powers, however, opened some schools in their respective areas of control, each power offering instruction in its own language. A few of these schools, especially the Italian and French ones, continued to function after World War I and played a significant role in introducing Western educational methods and principles. Particularly important was the National Lycée of Korçë, in which the language of instruction was French.

Soon after the establishment of a national government in 1920, which included a ministry of education, the foundation was laid for a national education system. Elementary schools were opened in the cities and some of the larger towns, and the Italian and French schools that had opened during World War I were strengthened. In the meantime, two important American schools were founded: the American Vocational School in Tirana, established by the American Junior Red Cross in 1921, and the American Agricultural School in Kavajë, sponsored by the Near East Foundation. Several future communist party and government luminaries were educated in the foreign schools: Enver Hoxha graduated from the National Lycée in 1930, and Mehmet Shehu, who would become prime minister, completed studies at the American Vocational School in 1932.

In the 1920s, the period when the foundations of the modern Albanian state were laid, considerable progress was made toward development of a genuinely Albanian education system. In 1922, with the request of the intellectuals of Shkodra, the first secular, state gymnasium was established, known as "The State Gymnasium" (Albanian: Gjimnazi i Shtetit), recently known as "28 Nëntori" Gymnasium. In 1933 the Royal Constitution was amended to make the education of citizens an exclusive right of the state. All foreign-language schools, except the American Agricultural School, were either closed or nationalised. This move was intended to stop the rapid spread of schools sponsored directly by the Italian government, especially among Roman Catholics in the north.

The nationalisation of schools was followed in 1934 by a far-reaching reorganisation of the entire education system. The new system called for compulsory elementary education from the ages of four to fourteen. It also provided for the expansion of secondary schools of various kinds; the establishment of new technical, vocational, and commercial secondary schools; and the acceleration and expansion of teacher training. The obligatory provisions of the 1934 reorganisation law were never enforced in rural areas because the peasants needed their children to work in the fields, and because of a lack of schoolhouses, teachers, and means of transportation.

The only minority schools operating in Albania before World War II were those for the Greek minority living in the district of Gjirokastër. These schools too were closed by the constitutional amendment of 1933, but Greece referred the case to the International Permanent Court of Justice, which forced Albania to reopen them.

Pre-World War II Albania had no university-level education and all advanced studies were pursued abroad. Every year the state granted a limited number of scholarships to deserving high school graduates, who otherwise could not afford to continue their education. But the largest number of university students came from well-to-do families and thus were privately financed. The great majority of the students attended Italian universities because of their proximity and because of the special relationship between the Rome and Tirana governments. The Italian government itself, following a policy of political, economic, military, and cultural penetration of the country, granted a number of scholarships to Albanian students recommended by its legation in Tirana.

Soon after the Italians occupied Albania in April 1939, the education system came under complete Italian control. Use of the Italian language was made compulsory in all secondary schools, and the fascist ideology and orientation were incorporated into the curricula. After 1941, however, when guerrilla groups began to operate against the Italian forces, the whole education system became paralysed. Secondary schools became centres of resistance and guerrilla recruitment, and many teachers and students went to the mountains to join resistance groups. By September 1943, when Italy capitulated to the Allies and German troops invaded and occupied Albania, education had come to a complete standstill.

== Communist period ==
Upon taking power in late 1944, the communist regime gave high priority to reopening the schools and organising the whole education system to reflect communist ideology. The regime's objectives for the new school system were to wipe out illiteracy in the country as soon as possible, to struggle against "bourgeois survivals" in the country's culture, to transmit to Albanian youth the ideas and principles of communism as interpreted by the party, and finally to educate the children of all social classes on the basis of these principles. The 1946 communist constitution made it clear that the regime intended to bring all children under the control of the state. All schools were soon placed under state management. At the same time, due to the lack of specialists in many fields of knowledge, a lot of young people were sent abroad to the countries Albania had diplomatic connections with (Soviet Union, Czechoslovakia, Poland, Romania etc.)

The 1946 Education Reform Law provided specifically that Marxist-Leninist principles would permeate all school texts. This law also made the struggle against illiteracy a primary objective of the new school system. In September 1949, the government promulgated a law requiring all citizens between the ages of twelve and forty who could not read to attend classes in reading and writing. Courses for illiterate peasants were established by the education sections of the people's councils. The political organs of the armed forces provided parallel courses for illiterate military personnel.

In addition to providing for free seven-year obligatory elementary schooling and four-year secondary education, the 1946 law called for the establishment of a network of vocational, trade, and teacher-training schools to prepare personnel, technicians, and skilled workers for various social, cultural, and economic activities. Another education law adopted in 1948 provided for the further expansion of vocational and professional courses to train skilled and semiskilled workers and to increase the theoretical and professional knowledge of the technicians.

In the 1950s, the school system was given a thorough Soviet orientation in terms both of communist ideological propaganda and central government control. Secondary technical schools were established along the same lines. In 1951 three institutes of higher learning were founded: the Higher Pedagogic Institute, the Higher Polytechnical Institute, and the Higher Agricultural Institute, all patterned on Soviet models. Most textbooks, especially those dealing with scientific and technical matters, were Soviet translations. Courses for teacher preparation were established in which the Russian language, Soviet methods of pedagogy and psychology, and Marxist-Leninist dialectics were taught by Soviet instructors. A team of Soviet educators laid the structural, curricular, and ideological foundations of the Enver Hoxha University at Tirana (now called University of Tirana), which was established in 1957.

By 1960 the system of elementary and secondary education had evolved into an eleven-year program encompassing schools of general education and vocational and professional institutes. The schools of general education consisted of primary school years one to four, intermediate years five to seven, and secondary school years eight to eleven. In October 1960, however, as Soviet-Albanian tensions were reaching the breaking point, the Albanian Party of Labour issued a resolution calling for the reorganisation of the whole school system. The resolution's real aim was to purge the schools of Soviet influence and rewrite the textbooks. An additional year was added to the eleven-year general education program, and the whole school system was integrated more closely with industry in order to prepare Albanian youth to replace the Soviet specialists, should the latter be withdrawn, as they eventually were in 1961.

A subsequent reform divided the education system into four general categories: preschool, general eight-year program, secondary, and higher education. The compulsory eight-year program was designed to provide pupils with the elements of ideological, political, moral, aesthetic, physical, and military education. The new system lowered the entrance age for pupils from seven to six, and no longer separated primary and intermediate schools.

Secondary education began with grade nine (usually at age fourteen), and ended with grade twelve. Secondary schools offered four-year general education programs or four-year vocational and professional programs, including industrial, agricultural, pedagogic, trade, arts, and health tracks, among others. Some programs lasted only two years.

The term of study in the institutes of higher education lasted three to five years, and tuition was also free at this level. Provision was made to expand higher education by increasing the number of full-time students, setting up new branches in places where there were no post-secondary institutes, and organising specialised courses in which those who had completed higher education would be trained to become highly qualified technical and scientific cadres. All full-time graduate students had to serve a probationary period of nine months in industrial production and three months in military training, in addition to the prescribed military training in school. There were also post-secondary Party schools, such as Lenin Higher Party School, which existed simply to promote the regime's philosophy.

Adult education was provided in the same sequence as full-time schooling for younger students, with two exceptions. First, the eight-year general education segment was noncompulsory, and was compressed into a six-year program that allowed for completion of the first four years in two years. Second, those who wanted to proceed to higher institutes after completing secondary school had to devote one year to preparatory study instead of engaging in production work, as full-time students did.

Official statistics indicated that the regime made considerable progress in education. Illiteracy had been virtually eliminated by the late 1980s. From a total enrolment of fewer than 60,000 students at all levels in 1939, the number of people in school had grown to more than 750,000 by 1987; also, there were more than 40,000 teachers in Albania. About 47% of all students were female. The proportion of eighth-grade graduates who continued with some type of secondary education increased from 39% in 1980 to 73% in 1990, with no village reporting a figure lower than 56%.

== Contemporary ==
A reorganisation plan was announced in 1990 that would extend the compulsory education program from eight to ten years. The following year, however, a major economic and political crisis in Albania, and the ensuing breakdown of public order, plunged the school system into chaos. Widespread vandalism and extreme shortages of textbooks and supplies had a devastating effect on school operations, prompting Italy and other countries to provide material assistance. The minister of education reported in September 1991 that nearly one-third of the 2,500 schools below the university level had been ransacked and fifteen school buildings razed. Many teachers relocated from rural to urban areas, leaving village schools understaffed and swelling the ranks of the unemployed in the cities and towns; about 2,000 teachers fled the country. The highly controlled environment that the communist regime had forced upon the educational system over the course of more than forty-six years was finally liberated set for improvement.

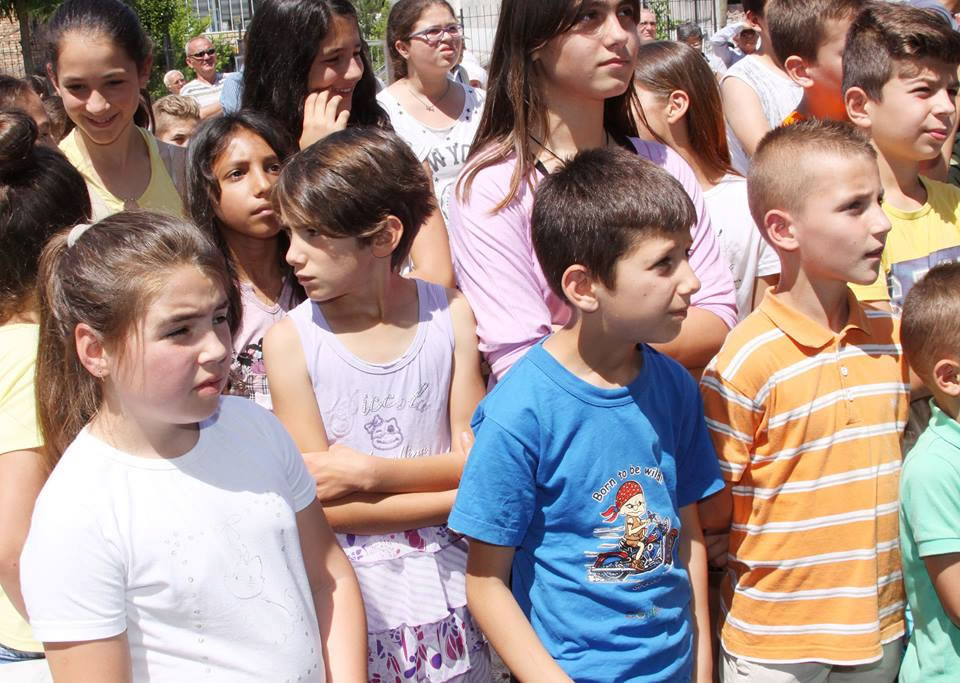
Young Albanian school children

As in Communism, teacher discipline remains a major problem in the Albanian education system, as teachers resort to violence, while students are expected to simply memorise the assigned material. Furthermore, corruption among teachers is becoming a problem as 'envelopes' and expensive gifts are the norm when faced with important deadlines, such as entry averages, or failing the grade. However, there has been an effort to adopt the Western model whereby the student is at the centre of the education system as opposed to the current Eastern model where the teacher holds the dominant role.

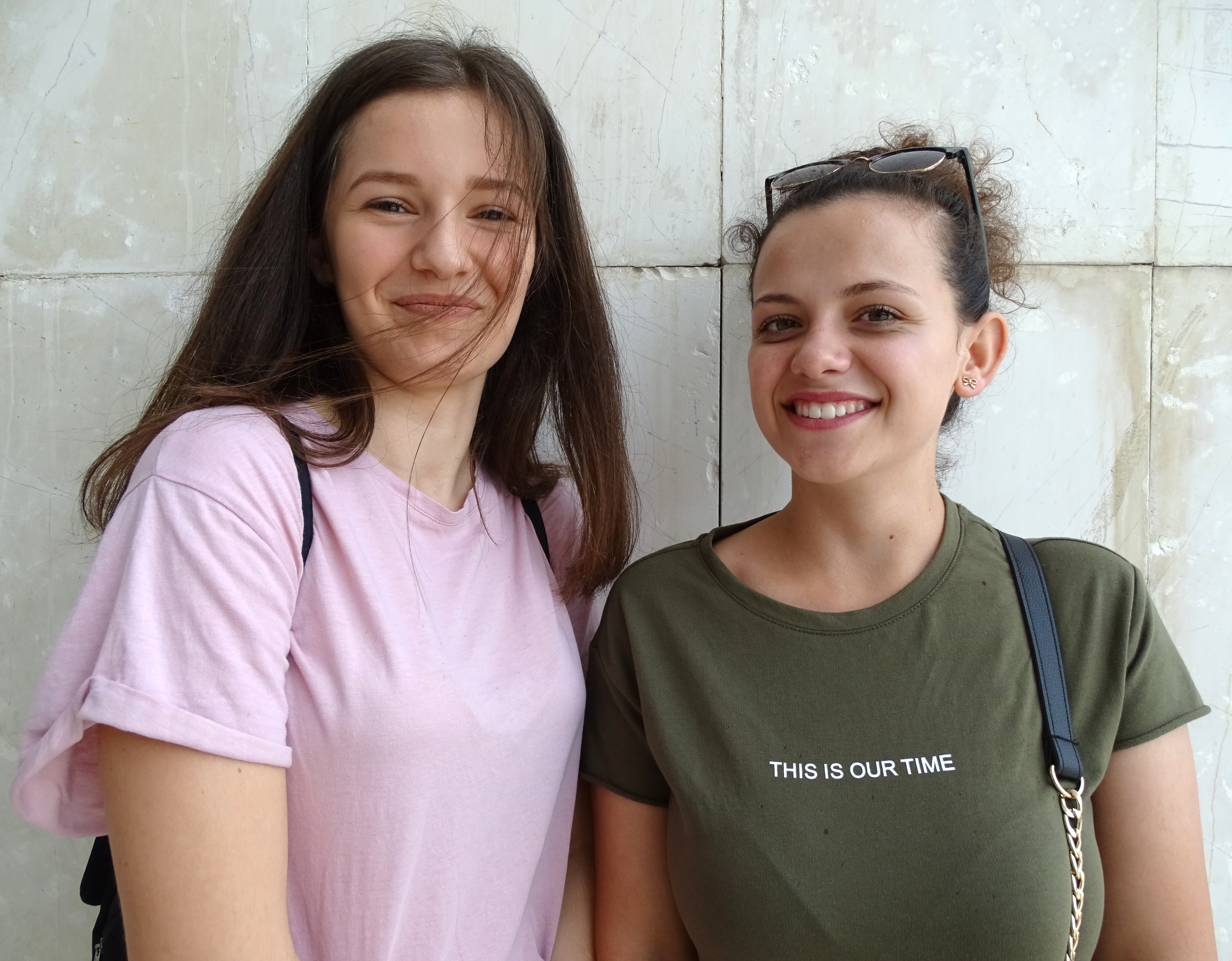
University students in Tirana

In the late 1990s, many schools were rebuilt or reconstructed to improve learning conditions through the Soros Open Society Foundations. Most of the improvements have happened in the larger cities, such as the capital Tirana. The latter suffers from vast overcrowding of classrooms, resulting in 2 daytime teaching shifts, while heating during the winter is a major problem. The old communist propaganda has been taken out of all school curricula and more emphasis has been put on mathematics, sciences and humanities. The school week was shortened from 6 to a 5-day week. Some of the wealthier schools have begun introducing computers, but many schools still lack basic supplies for laboratory classes.

Meanwhile, private, non-public institutions across all levels have opened up with improved teaching material, staff, and added extra curricular activities but expensive fees. Similar changes have also taken place in the post-secondary level. A number of private universities have been established in different cities of Albania, offering students possibilities of studying in different branches. E-learning programs have begun to be introduced, offering students the possibility of following online courses. However, some post-secondary private institutions have become known as simply "diploma factories", as was the case with the granting of a controversial university diploma to the son of famous Italian politician Umberto Bossi. As a result, the Albanian government has closed a dozen of such institutions in an attempt to clamp down on the phenomenon.

Between 2009 and 2013, the textbook industry was deregulated in an effort to make textbooks more affordable thus offering a wider choice to students and instructors. However, the sector became vulnerable to favouritism and the Albanian education system experienced a decline in quality. It became flooded with texts written by writers without credible credentials resulting in mediocre texts with dubious content. One of them featured a story about mixing chalk with water and drinking it to become ill and skip classes. A physics textbook required students to find the colour of a bear, which was chasing a human up a tree. Other texts made explicit use of profanity.

Since 2013, the above texts were banned and more reputable ones from Pearson and Oxford were introduced in an effort to harmonise the Albanian education system with the EU. In addition, students between years 1 to 5 are provided with free textbooks.

In the winter of 2018-19, student protests took place in Tirana to demand better education infrastructure, slash tuition fees, and denounce favouritism, corruption, and sexual favours among teaching staff. The government accepted the demands, and student dorms at Student City in Tirana are being reconstructed as part of the University Pact between the government and public academic institutions in Albania.

In recent years, foreign students mainly from Southern Italy are getting enrolled in Italian-affiliated universities in Tirana in the hope of better preparing for entrance exams in Italy's universities.

== System ==
- Preschool education (çerdhe or kopësht): 1–4 years
- Primary education (9-vjeçare): 9 years (8 years prior to 2008)
- Secondary education:
  - Regular (e mesme or gjimnaz): 3 years
  - Vocational or Technical (teknike): 2–5 years
- Tertiary education:
  - Bachelor and master's degrees (of 3 years and 1.5–2 years respectively)
- Quaternary education (doktoratë): 3 years

== See also ==
- List of schools in Albania
- List of universities in Albania
- Beslidhja Skaut Albania
- University of Tirana
- Projekti rinor qytetar
