= Liri Belishova =

Albanian politician (1926–2018)

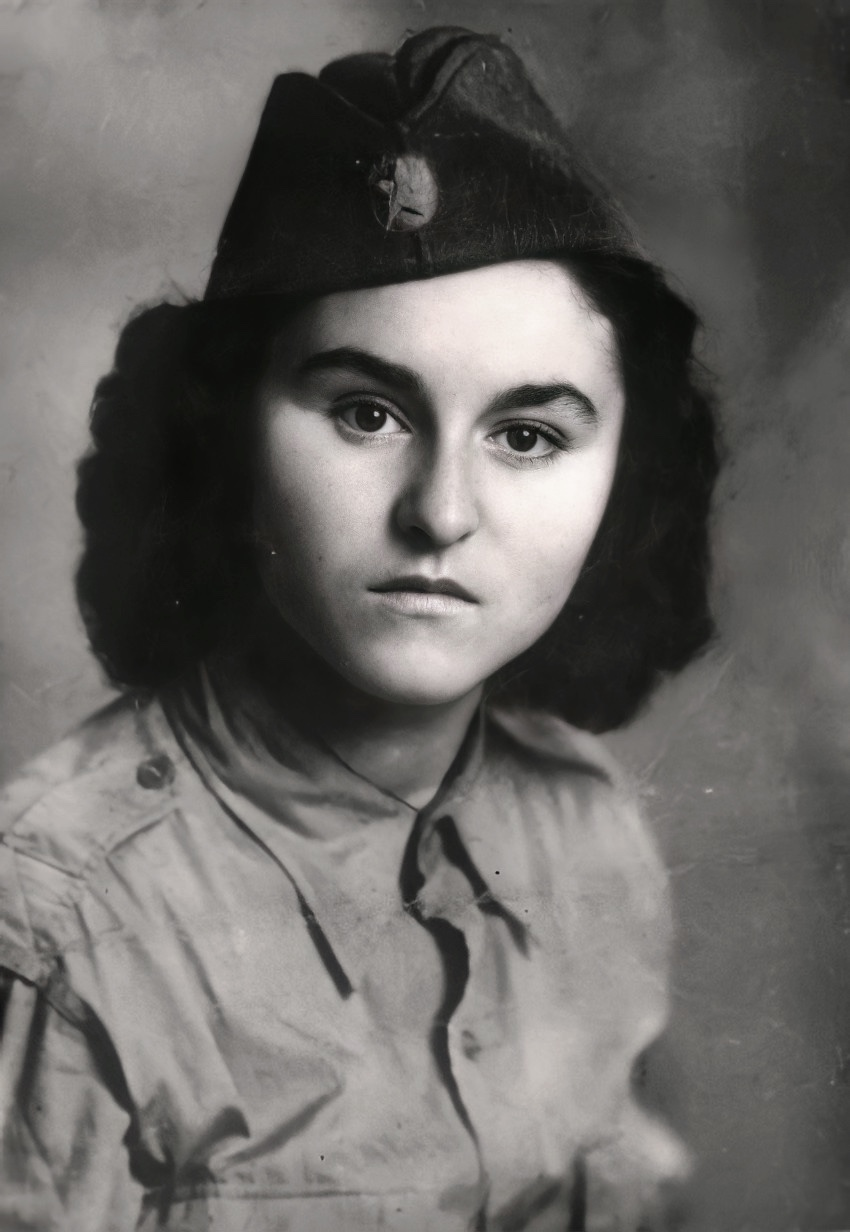

Personal details
- Born: 14 October 1926 Mallakastër, Albania
- Died: 23 April 2018 (aged 91) Tirana, Albania
- Party: Party of Labour of Albania
- Spouse(s): Nako Spiru (1946–1947); Maqo Çomo (m. 1958–1998)
- Children: Drita, Petrit
- Education: Queen Mother Pedagogical Institute

Liri Belishova (14 October 1926 – 23 April 2018) was an Albanian politician. She was a member of the Politburo of the Party of Labour of Albania and an important political figure in Albania between 1944 and 1960.

== Life ==
Born in the village of Belishovë, Mallakastër, Belishova was the daughter of Albanian patriot Kamber Belishova, a participant in the Congress of Durrës and the Vlora War.

Belishova attended the Queen Mother Pedagogical Institute in Tirana, along with Nexhmije Hoxha, Ramize Gjebrea, Fiqrete Shehu and Vito Kapo. She joined the National Liberation Movement of Albania and lost one eye. During 1946-47, she was Albania's Popular Youth (Rinia Popullore) president. The death of her husband, Nako Spiru, in 1946, an alleged suicide, led to her dismissal from her role and she was sent from Tirana to Berat to teach.

After Nako Spiru was rehabilitated, as a result of the Yugoslav–Albanian split, in 1948, Belishova was rehabilitated as well, and became a member of the Politburo of the Party of Labour of Albania from 1948-60.

She attended, along with Ramiz Alia, the Marxist–Leninist institute of the Moscow State University from 1952 to 1954, and married during this period her second husband, Maqo Çomo, who was Minister of Agriculture during 1954–60.

In 1960, during the Soviet–Albanian split, Belishova was arrested on charges of being pro-Soviet and a friend of Nikita Khrushchev. She, her husband Çomo and old communist Koço Tashko had protested against Enver Hoxha's unilateral decision to take a pro-Chinese stance, warning about the consequences of a split with the Soviets. She was purged as a traitor and enemy of the Party and people.

On 9 November 1960, her family was moved to a state-owned farm in Gjirokastër District, where she worked as a teacher and her husband as the farm director. After that, they were expelled from the Party and interned in Kuç near Vlorë, later in Progonat, Zvërnec, and Cërrik. In 1991, Belishova returned to Tirana.

== Family ==
She was married twice (Nako Spiru and Maqo Çomo).

In the second marriage (with Maqo Çomo) Belishova had a daughter Drita, who was a poet and died early, and a son Petrit. From his previous marriage, her husband had two other daughters, Tatjana and Mira.

== Death ==
Belishova died in 2018, aged 91.

== See also ==
- Communism in Albania
