= Didi Biçaku =

Albanian historian (1924–2023)

- Born: Hedije Biçaku Maliqi; 23 May 1924; Elbasan, Albania
- Died: 6 September 2023 (aged 99)
- Other name: Didi Maliqi
- Education: Queen Mother Pedagogical Institute
- Known for: Survivor of Massacre of 1951 in Albania
- Children: 2
- Relatives: Aqif Pasha Elbasani (uncle)

Hedije Biçaku Maliqi (23 May 1924 – 6 September 2023) was an Albanian historian and partisan woman who survived the Massacre of 1951 in Albania.

== Early life ==
Bicaku was born in May 1924 in Elbasan. Together with her older sister, Semije Sejdini, daughter of Qani Bicaku, granddaughter of Aqif Pasha Elbasani, both attended the "Queen Mother Pedagogical Institute". They were just two sisters after their father was put in prison by the Young Turks because he was dealing with the national issue and the protection of the Albanian language. There he fell ill and died, leaving his orphaned daughters. Although they came from the most famous patriotic and noble family, the two sisters behaved just like other girls. During the time of the lessons, Didi was also involved in sports, sliding on skates through the streets of Tirana.

== Education ==
After finishing school in 1947, Didi was appointed a teacher in the village of Paftal in Berat. A teaching lesson with students was also opened against illiteracy and courses for tailoring. Differences continued even in the city of Berat, saying a team with a volleyball girl participated in the national spartan and during the competition they came first. After two years of work, they fired her after her uncle was imprisoned. She went to complain and started working at an Albanian Red Cross pharmacy, but she was fired again.

== Massacre of 1951 ==
In 1951, they lived with their mother and their sister's husband, the prominent lawyer Fejzo Sejdini, at the house of Bajram Curri's daughter. After midnight, on that very cold night of 23 February, there was a loud knock on the door, three armed security soldiers rushed in and with the list in their hands they read the names of the family members. When they read the name Didi Bicaku, they say: "In the name of the people, you are under arrest! Hands up!" They checked the house from corner to corner, her sister, Semija was sitting on the couch, down there was the English language book that Didi was learning. They were not supposed to see it because foreign languages were forbidden. She stood proud, shocked, without tears in her eyes, put on her thick coat, her sister's husband threw a large woollen scarf over her shoulders, and security took her handcuffed. They pushed her to "Skënderbej" Square, where hundreds of others had gathered, threatened by the weapons of those who guarded them, and walked towards the New Prison.

At the prison door, Didi waited for almost two hours, they had to enter one by one. She went through the big gate, then the next gate, they pushed her to a dungeon door. There were many people in there and it was completely dark. She met there Sabiha Kasimati who was executed by firing squad in 1951. They were the only two female prisoners.

== Later life and death ==
After leaving prison, Biçaku worked as a seamstress, later as a construction worker and received the sixth grade. She married into the Maliqi family, patriotic people who worked and fought for the Independence of Albania. She lived in Tirana and had two children.

Biçaku died on 6 September 2023, at the age of 99.
