= Aleksandër Xhuvani =

Albanian philologist and educator

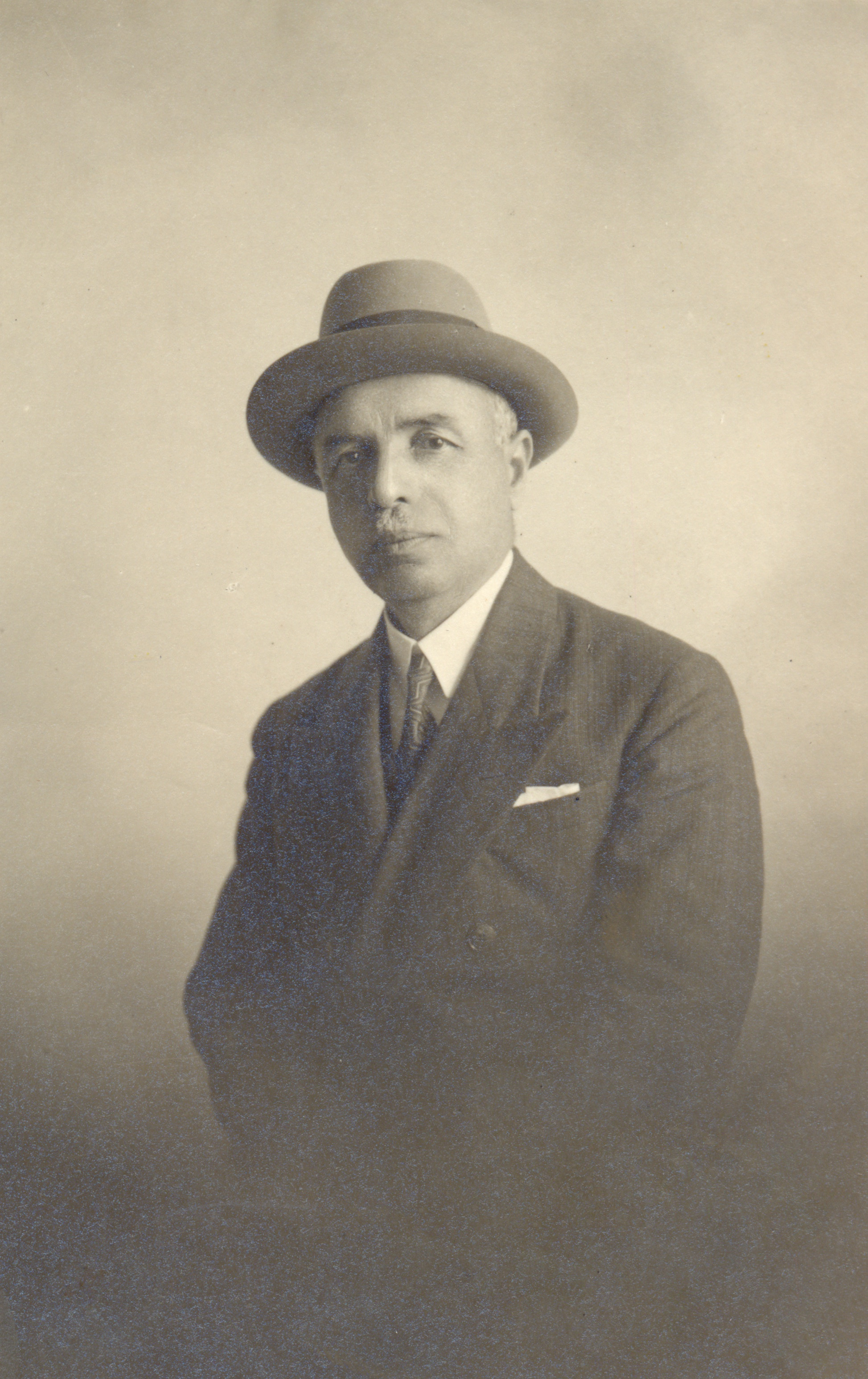
- Born: 14 March 1880; Elbasan, Ottoman Empire
- Died: 22 November 1961 (aged 81); Tirana, PR Albania
- Occupations: Writer, scholar
- Children: 5
- Relatives: Ramiz Alia (son-in-law)
- Writing career
- Notable awards: People's Teacher Honor of the Nation

Aleksandër Xhuvani (14 March 1880 – 22 November 1961) was an Albanian philologist and educator. Xhuvani spent much of his career working for the improvement of Albanian schools; he also advocated the standardization of the Albanian language in the years following Albania's independence. Among his writings are grammars in Albanian, as well as a dictionary of the language. Xhuvani also served as a politician, sitting in both the Constituent Assembly of the Albanian Kingdom and as a member of the Assembly of the Republic of Albania. In the latter he served as vice-president of the Presidium towards the end of his life.

Elbasan's Aleksandër Xhuvani University is named after him.

== Life ==
Aleksandër Xhuvani was born on March 14, 1880, in Elbasan, then Ottoman Empire. He completed elementary school in his hometown at "Normalja e Elbasanit", while the high school in Tsotyli, then part of the Manastir Vilayet. In 1902 he began his studies at the Faculty of Philology at the University of Athens and graduated in 1906. In August of the same year he was invited by Luigj Gurakuqi to teach in Albanian at the Arbëreshë College of San Demetrio Corone in the province of Cosenza, Italy.
