= Queen Mother Pedagogical Institute =

Women's pedagogical high school in Tirana

Coordinates: 41.328056°N 19.824889°E

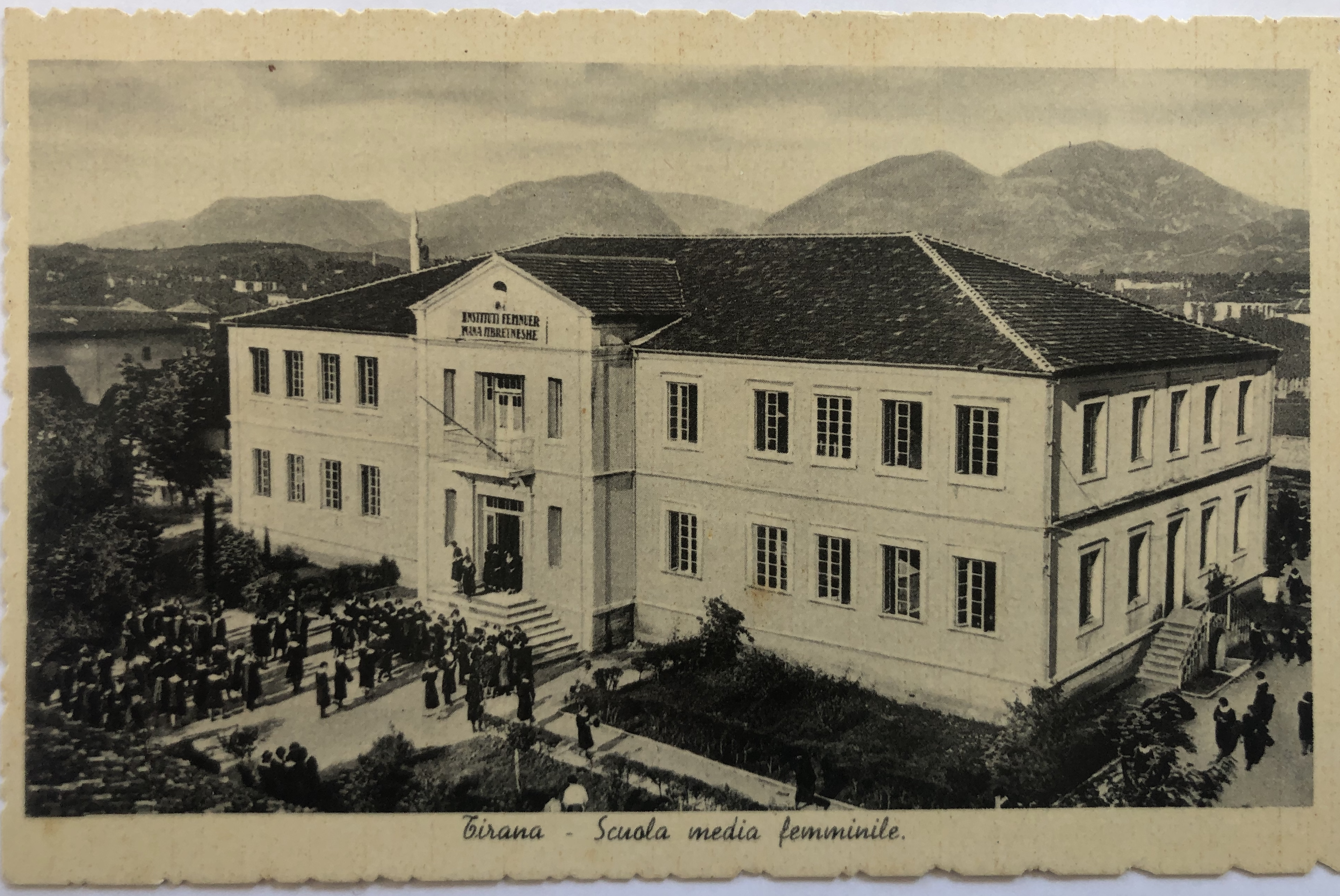
The institute on a postcard of 1939

The Queen Mother Pedagogical Institute (Albanian: Instituti Femnuer "Nana Mbretneshë"), was a women's pedagogical high school, created in 1933 in Tirana, Albania.

The Institute, authorized by Government Decree No. 666 on October 2, 1933, commenced operations on November 30, 1933. The school initially enrolled 388 students, including 100 residents of Tirana and others from outside the city. The institute was a merger of an American school in Kavajë, Christo Dako's school for misses “Qiriazi”, the Stigmatines women's school of Shkoder, and the Normal Women's School of Korçë.

The institute is named after Queen Mother Sadijé Toptani, mother of King Zog.

== In arts ==
The Institute is part of the movie Vajzat me kordele te kuqe, a 1978 production of the Kinostudjo Shqiperia e Re.

== Notable alumni ==
- Liri Belishova
- Liri Gega
- Ramize Gjebrea
- Nexhmije Hoxha
- Vito Kapo
- Fiqrete Shehu
- Margarita Tutulani

== Notable faculty ==
- Androniqi Zengo Antoniu
