= Nexhmije Hoxha =

Albanian politician (1921–2020)

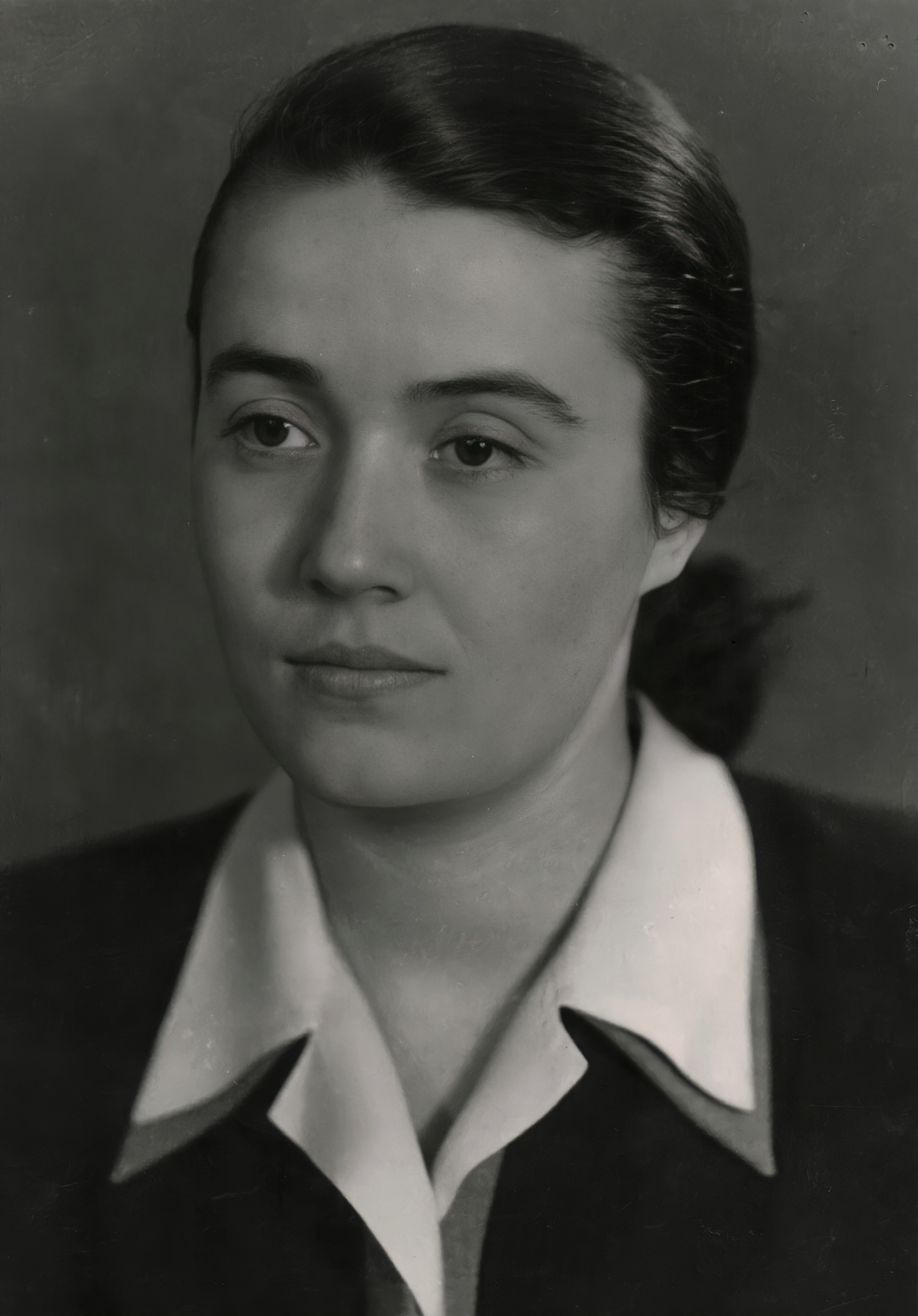
- Hoxha in 1944

First Lady of Albania
- In office 23 October 1944 – 11 April 1985
- Leader: Enver Hoxha
- Succeeded by: Semiramis Xhuvani Alia

Personal details
- Born: Nexhmije Xhuglini; 8 February 1921 Bitola, Yugoslavia
- Died: 26 February 2020 (aged 99) Tirana, Albania
- Party: Party of Labour of Albania (1941–1991); Communist Party of Albania (1991–2020)
- Spouse: Enver Hoxha (m. 1945; died 1985)
- Children: 3, including Ilir
- Education: Queen Mother Pedagogical Institute; University of Tirana

Nexhmije Hoxha (Note: Albanian pronunciation: [nɛdʒˈmijɛ ˈhɔdʒa]) (née Xhuglini; 8 February 1921 – 26 February 2020) was an Albanian communist politician. She was the wife of Enver Hoxha, the first leader of the People's Socialist Republic of Albania and the First Secretary of the Party of Labour of Albania. Very close to her husband, she attempted to remain politically influential after his death in 1985. She was one of the few spouses of a ruling communist party leader with a high political profile of her own.

== Biography ==
Nexhmije Hoxha was born Nexhmije Xhuglini in Bitola, in present-day North Macedonia, then Yugoslavia. Later moving with her parents to the Albanian capital, Tirana, she studied at the Queen Mother Pedagogical Institute. In November 1941, while still training to be a schoolteacher, she joined the newly founded Communist Party of Albania and a year later was elected to the General Council of the Albanian National Liberation Movement.

During the Second World War she fought against the forces of Fascist Italy and German Wehrmacht troops, as part of the First Division of the National Liberation Army, a resistance group which was dominated by communists and supported by Special Operations Executive forces which were sent to Albania by the British. In 1943 she was elected to the Secretariat of the Albanian Women's League, and served as its chairwoman from 1946 to 1952, replacing Ollga Plumbi.

=== Relationship with Enver Hoxha ===
The then Nexhmije Xhuglini met Enver Hoxha at a meeting of the Albanian Party of Labour. Hoxha proposed to her in 1942 at a house which was being rented to him by the generous party supporter Syrja Selfo, who would be sentenced to death and executed in 1946. Then for the next several months, the Hoxhas stayed on and off in the house of Enver's brother-in-law Bahri Omari, who was destined to be executed by a firing squad in 1945 for collaboration with Nazi occupation forces. They married in 1945. Enver Hoxha steadily rose to a prominent position after the end of the war and the establishment of a Communist government.

== Political career ==
In 1966, as Albania increasingly isolated itself, she became director of the Institute of Marxist–Leninist Studies, a body which was responsible for ensuring ideological purity and spreading propaganda. Her relationship with the Sigurimi secret police is widely discussed. Nexhmije later claimed in her 1998 memoir, My Life with Enver, that her husband expressed some regrets over the number of executions which the Sigurimi carried out.

After her husband died in 1985, Nexhmije was elected chairwoman of the Democratic Front, an umbrella association, and she defended her husband's heritage during the period of reforms (1990–1991). She was forced to resign as chairwoman of the Democratic Front in December 1990, and she was replaced by Prime Minister Adil Çarçani.

In the initial days after the fall of communism in Albania, she described Ramiz Alia as a "national traitor", but later recanted her statement, claiming that Alia and the entire Party of Labour of Albania only tried to save what could be saved of socialism, that he could not be described as a "national traitor" and that the original accusation came only out of personal anger and emotion.

== Later life and death ==
She was expelled from PLA/SPA on 13 June 1991, and the party organ Zeri i Popullit criticised her for her allegedly pompous way of life. She was arrested on 10 December 1991 and at the end of January 1993, she was sentenced to nine years in prison for embezzlement of 750,000 leks. The sentence was increased to eleven years by the appeal court. Hoxha was released from prison in January 1997.

Hoxha died on 26 February 2020, aged 99, at her home in Tirana from natural causes. At the time of her death she was the oldest living member of the communist leadership of Albania.

== Personal life ==
For many years, she lived with her husband in the section of Tirana which was known as the Bllok, reserved for the country's ruling elite. However, Nexhmije maintained that she personally did not live extravagantly, emphasizing the prosaic nature of her marriage ceremony in 1945, which did not include a dress, a reception or a honeymoon.
