= Greeks in Albania =

Ethnic group in Albania

Greeks in Albania Έλληνες στην Αλβανία Grekët në Shqipëri
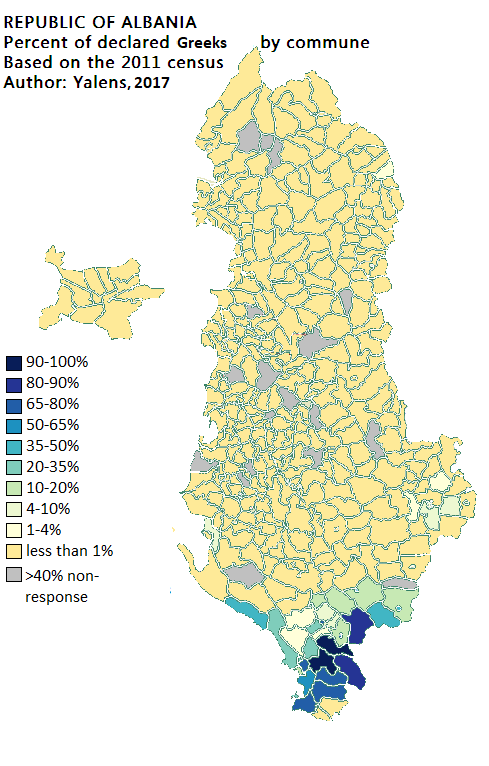

Regions with significant populations
- Albania, Greece, United States
- Albania: 23,485 (2023 census)
- United States: over 15,000 (est. 1965)

Languages
- Greek, Albanian; Aromanian by Hellenized Aromanians

Religion
- Greek Orthodox Church

Ethnic Greeks live in or originate from areas within modern Albania. They form the largest minority group in the country. They are mostly concentrated in the south of the country, in the areas of the northern part of the historical region of Epirus, in parts of Vlorë County, Gjirokastër, Korçë, and Berat County. The area is also known by them as Northern Epirus. Consequently, the Greeks hailing specifically from Southern Albania are also known as Northern Epirotes (Greek: Βορειοηπειρώτες Vorioipirotes, Albanian: Vorioepirot). The Greeks who live in the "minority zones" of Albania are officially recognised by the Albanian government as the Greek National Minority of Albania (Greek: Ελληνική Μειονότητα στην Αλβανία, Elliniki Mionotita stin Alvania; Albanian: Minoriteti Grek në Shqipëri).

In 1913, after the end of five centuries of Ottoman rule, the area was included under the sovereignty of the newly founded Albanian state. The following year, Greeks revolted and declared their independence, and with the following Protocol of Corfu the area was recognised as an autonomous region under nominal Albanian sovereignty. However, this was never implemented.

In the communist era the Greek population suffered from the prohibition of the Greek language if spoken outside the recognised so-called "minority zones" (which have remained after their establishment in the communist era) and even limitations on the official use of its language within those zones. During the same period many formerly Greek place-names were officially changed to Albanian ones. Greeks from the "minority zones" were also frequently forcibly moved to other parts of the country since they were seen as possible sources of dissent and ethnic tension. The Communist system did not discriminate against the Greek minority based on ethnicity, and overall the minority faced the same issues as the rest of Albania's population under a dictatorship. A considerable number of Greeks integrated into Albanian society, acquired higher education and positions in the political, intellectual and military elite of the country. Around 1990, most Western estimates of the number of ethnic Greeks in Albania were around 200,000 but in the 1990s, a majority of them migrated to Greece. In post-1990 era, these issues, including the emerging subject of private property rights, continue to persist to an extent.

In the 2023 census around 23,485 self-declared as Greek. Approximately 189,000 people from Albania that migrated to Greece had received special identity cards, which are reserved for ethnic Greeks, although in 2022 this number was down to 13,329 as most of them had by then acquired Greek citizenship and no longer needed the special cards. Apart from ethnic Greeks, many Aromanians and Albanians claimed to be Greeks to get the status of homogeneis (recognising Greek identity) and later citizenship.

== Southern Albania ==
The Greek minority in Albania is concentrated in the south of the country, near the border with Greece. After 1912, in Greece part of this area became known as Northern Epirus. The Greek community is located in the former districts of Sarandë (particularly in Finiq municipality), Gjirokastër (especially in the area of Dropull), part of Delvinë and in three villages of Himara and the two villages Nartë and Zvërnec, which form the northernmost island of Greek speech in Vlorë County. The areas where the Greek community forms the main part of the population are not a uniform region, but areas interspersed by Albanian communities, except for Dropull which is located along the border with Greece.

=== Recognised Greek "minority zone" ===
Flag of the Greek Autonomous Republic of Northern Epirus established in 1914 is used by many Northern Epirotes.

The communist government (1945–1991), in order to establish control over the areas populated by the Greek minority, declared the so-called "minority zones" (Albanian: Zona e minoritarëve), consisting of 99 villages in the southern districts of Gjirokastër, Sarandë, and Delvina.

Tirana's official minority policy defines the Greek origin of Albanian citizens according to the language, religion, birth and ancestors originating from the areas of the so-called "minority zones". The Albanian law on minorities acknowledges the rights of the Greek minority only to those people who live in the areas which are recognized as minority zones. The last census that included ethnicity, from 1989, included only the numbers of the Greek minority in the minority zones. Ethnic Greeks living outside those areas were not counted as such. This has had a practical effect in the area of education: With the exception of the officially recognized Greek minority zones, where teaching was held in both the Greek and Albanian languages, in all other areas of Albania lessons were taught only in the Albanian language.

=== Aromanians ===
Work in Greece is of importance in Albania, and people who declare to be members of the Greek minority or prove their "Greek origin", receive special benefits and identity cards. A substantial number of Aromanians (Vlachs) in south-eastern Albania, as well as some Muslim Albanians, have claimed Greek identity based on pro-Greek social networks and identity idioms of the past. Also, Aromanians from villages around Vlorë, who identified as "Helleno-Vlach", were able to obtain visas and work permits without any difficulties. It has been suggested that a certain number of Aromanians have claimed to be Greek in exchange for benefits; such as Greek pensions, passports and visas.

=== Other Greek communities in Albania ===
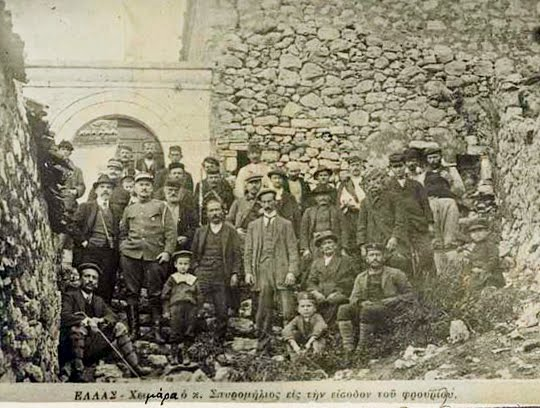
Captain of Himara, Spyros Spyromilios, leader of the local revolt, 1912

However, the official Albanian definition about minorities did not recognize as members of a minority ethnic Greeks who live outside the 99 villages in mixed areas inhabited by both Greek and Albanian speaking populations, even in areas where ethnic Greeks form a majority (e.g. Himara). Consequently, the Greek communities in Himarë, Korçë, Vlorë and Berat did not have access to any minority rights.

Contrary to the official Albanian definition, which generally provides a limited definition of the ethnic Greeks living in Albania, Greek migration policy defines the Greek origin on the basis of language, religion, birth and ancestors from the region called Northern Epirus. In that way, according to the Greek State Council, the Greek ethnic origin can be granted on the basis of cultural ancestry (sharing "common historical memories" and/or links with "historic homelands and culture"), Greek descent (Greek Albanians have to prove that the birthplace of their parents or grandparents is in Northern Epirus), language, and religion.

It has been noted that Albanians have declared themselves as Greeks in the past 20 years in exchange to reside and work in Greece. This allegedly encouraged the process of Greek irredentism in "Northern Epirus". Albanian sources often use the pejorative term filogrek (pro-Greek) in relation to ethnic Greeks, usually in a context disputing their Greek ancestry.

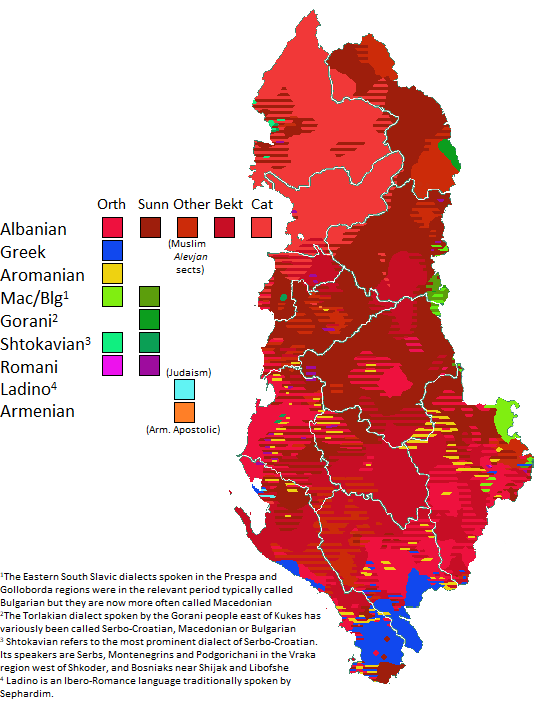
Traditional locations of linguistic and religious communities in Albania.

The Greek minority in Albania is located mostly compactly, within the wider Gjirokastër and Sarandë regions and in four settlements within the coastal Himarë area where they form an overall majority population. Greek speaking settlements are also found within Përmet municipality, near the border. Some Greek speakers are also located within the wider Korçë region. Due to both forced and voluntary internal migration of Greeks within Albania during the communist era, some Greek speakers are also located within the wider Përmet and Tepelenë regions. Outside the area defined as Northern Epirus, two coastal Greek speaking villages exist near Vlorë; Nartë and Zvërnec. While due to forced and non-forced internal population movements of Greeks within Albania during the communist era, some Greek speakers are also dispersed within the Berat region.

=== Human rights violations in Albania ===
Human rights in Albania are violated by the Government which have targeted the Greek population via police and secret service according to Human Rights organisations. Greek communities have been targeted by development projects and had their homes demolished in alleged ethnic targeting of Greeks from Southern Albania. Also, according to Amnesty International there were cases of mistreatment of members of Greek minority by the authorities.

Also, the ethnic Greek minority complained about the government's unwillingness to recognize ethnic Greek towns outside communist-era "minority zones," to utilize Greek in official documents and on public signs in ethnic Greek areas, or to include more ethnic Greeks in public administration.

The 2012 USA annual report mention that the emergence of strident nationalist groups like the Red and Black Alliance (RBA) increased ethnic tensions with the Greek minority groups.

== Demographics ==
In the 2023 census in Albania, 23,485 people (0.98%) declared themselves Greek. In the Vlorë County 12,044 people (8.21%) were self-declared Greek, in the Gjirokastër County 8,552 (14.25%), and in the Korçë County 740 (0.42%).

The Greek minority in Albania is located compactly within the wider Gjirokastër and Sarandë regions, (Note: "According to the latest census in the area, the Greek-speaking population is larger but not necessarily continuous and concentrated. The exclusively Greek-speaking villages, apart from Himarë, are Queparo Siperme, Dhërmi and Palasë. The rest are inhabited by Albanian-speaking Orthodox Christians (Kallivretakis 1995:25-58)."; "The Greek minority of Albania is found in the southern part of the country and it mostly constitutes a compact group of people. Apart from the cities (Gjirokastër, Sarandë), whose population is mixed, the villages of these two areas, which are officially recognized as minority areas, are in the vast majority of their population Greek and their historical presence in this geographical space, has led to an identification of the group with this place.") (Note: "But in spite of the efforts of Greek schools and churches near Vlorë, Berat and Korçë, Greek speech only really exists today in the extreme south-west of Albania near Butrint and along the border as far as Kakavia, in three villages along the coast near Himarë, and in the Drinos valley near Gjirokastër. Even in these areas there are pockets of Albania speech, and almost all Greek-speakers are bilingual. Emigration to Greece has in the past ten years both emptied certain villages and increased the number of Greek-speakers. Pro-Greek feelings may have existed at other opportune times among people who spoke Albanian at home, but were Orthodox in religion and spoke Greek in commercial dealing or at church.") (Note: "Another factor contributing to the lower rate of increase in the Greek minority is the internal movement of the ethnic Greeks. The women who marry non-Greeks outside the minority areas often give up their Greek nationality. The same thing can be said about the ethnic Greeks, especially those with university training, who would be employed outside their villages. In particular, those working in large cities like Tirana very often would not declare their Greek nationality. ... As can be seen from Table I, the preponderant number of Greek nationals, 57,602, live in southern Albania, south of the Shkumbin River. Only 1,156 ethnic Greeks reside outside of this region, principally in the cities of Tirana, Durres and Elbasan. Thus, in southern Albania, with an area of 13,000 square kilometers and a population of 1,377,810, the Greek minority makes up 4.18 percent of the overall population. But the highest concentration of the Greek minority is located in an area of 1,000 square kilometers in the enclaves of Pogon, Dropull and Vurg, specifically, the townships of Lower Dropull, Upper Dropull and Pogon, in the district of Gjirokastra; the townships of Vergo, Finiq, Aliko, Mesopotam and the city of Delvina in the district of Delvina; and the townships of Livadhja, Dhiver and the city of Saranda, in the district of Saranda. This concentration has a total population of 53,986 ethnic Greeks. In turn, these enclaves are within the districts of Gjirokastra, Delvina and Saranda, with an area of 2,234 square kilometers which contains a total of 56,452 ethnic Greeks, or 36.6 percent of the general population of 154,141 in the region.") and also in four settlements within the coastal Himarë area where they form an overall majority population. (Note: "The coastal Himara region of Southern Albania has always had a predominantly ethnic Greek population.") Other Greek-speaking settlements are found within Përmet municipality, near the border, and two coastal villages near Vlorë outside the area defined as Northern Epirus. Some Greek speakers are also located within the wider Korçë region. Due to both forced and voluntary internal migration of Greeks within Albania during the communist era, (Note: "In contrast, Albanian governments use a much lower figure of 58,000 which rests on the unrevised definition of "minority" adopted during the communist period. Under this definition, minority status was limited to those who lived in 99 villages in the southern border areas, thereby excluding important concentrations of Greek settlement in Vlora (perhaps 8000 people in 1994) and in adjoining areas along the coast, ancestral Greek towns such as Himara, and ethnic Greeks living elsewhere throughout the country. Mixed villages outside this designated zone, even those with a clear majority of ethnic Greeks, were not considered minority areas and therefore were denied any Greek-language cultural or educational provisions. In addition, many Greeks were forcibly removed from the minority zones to other parts of the country as a product of communist population policy, an important and constant element of which was to pre-empt ethnic sources of political dissent. Greek place-names were changed to Albanian names, while use of the Greek language, prohibited everywhere outside the minority zones, was prohibited for many official purposes within them as well.") some Greek speakers are also located within the wider Përmet and Tepelenë regions. While due to forced and non-forced internal population movements of Greeks within Albania during the communist era, some Greek speakers are also dispersed within the wider Berat, (Note: "Berat was the seat of a Greek bishopric ... and today Vlach- and even Greek-speakers can be found in the town and the villages near by".) Durrës, Kavajë, Peqin, Elbasan and Tiranë regions. In the period 1945-1989, during the Hoxha regime, 99 settlements were officially recognized as being inhabited predominantly or exclusively inhabited by ethnic Greeks. Scholar Leonidas Kallivretakis who conducted demographic research (1994) in the region a few years after the regime's end, identified 92 settlements exclusively or near exclusively inhabited by ethnic Greeks, with another 16 mixed settlements with a Greek minority or plurality.

The vast majority of ethnic Greeks from Albania have emigrated to Greece since the 1990s. According to a 2005 estimate more than 80% had migrated to Greece by then. In Greece, they were issued a "special identity card" in the 1990s. The special identity card was acquired not only by ethnic Greeks but by Aromanians from Albania or people who could demonstrate an Aromanian heritage as Aromanians were recognized by Greece as being of Greek origin and Orthodox Albanians. In 2005, the right to obtain the special identity card was extended to non-Greek members in the families of ethnic Greeks. About 189,000 individuals acquired the special identity card by 2008. After Greek citizenship was made available, the number of special identity card holders has declined to about 13,000 in 2023.

== Politics ==
The minority's sociopolitical organization from promotion of Greek human rights, Omonoia, founded in January 1991, took an active role on minority issues. Omonoia was banned in the parliamentary elections of March 1991, because it violated the Albanian law which forbade 'formation of parties on a religious, ethnic and regional basis'. This situation resulted in a number of strong protests not only from the Greek side, but also from international organizations. Finally, on behalf of Omonoia, the Unity for Human Rights Party contested at the following elections, a party which aims to represent that Greek minority in the Albanian parliament. (Note: "Following strong protests by the Conference on Security... this decision was reversed.")

In more recent years, tensions have surrounded the participation of candidates of the Unity for Human Rights Party in Albanian elections. In 2000, the Albanian municipal elections were criticised by international human rights groups for "serious irregularities" reported to have been directed against ethnic Greek candidates and parties.

The municipal elections held in February 2007 saw the participation of a number of ethnic Greek candidates. Vasilis Bolanos was re-elected mayor of the southern town of Himarë despite the governing and opposition Albanian parties fielding a combined candidate against him. Greek observers have expressed concern at the "non-conformity of procedure" in the conduct of the elections. In 2015, Jorgo Goro, supported by the Socialist Party of Albania became the new mayor of Himara. Goro who himself had acquired Greek citizenship as a member of the minority declared in his election campaign that "there are no Greeks in Himara" and that he had changed his name from "Gjergj" to "Jorgo". The Greek state revoked his citizenship in 2017 on grounds of him "acting against national interests". In 2019 the candidacy of the representative of Omonoia, Fredis Beleris was rejected by the Albanian authorities due to a three-year conviction in the past. Albanian electoral law allows participation in elections as a candidate after 10 years have passed from the later conviction of a candidate. In the following election most of the Greek minority abstained from the procedure and Goro was re-elected. Several irregularities were also reported during the elections.

In 2004, there were five ethnic Greek members in the Albanian Parliament, and two ministers in the Albanian cabinet. The same number of parliamentary members were elected in the 2017 Albanian parliamentary election.

== Diaspora ==
=== Greece ===
A special ID card for ethnic Greeks from Albania was issued in 2001 which was received by 189,000 individuals who resided in Greece at the time. For ethnic Greeks from Albania this measure was seen as treating them as "lower class citizens" as in order to obtain it their "Greekness" was examined in the form of a questionnaire. Another issue with the special ID card had to do with ethnic Albanians using fake documents which presented them as members of the Greek minority to obtain it. In 2008, the citizenship law change in Greece allowed for holders of special ID cards to obtain Greek citizenship and about 45,000 did so just in the first three years of its implementation. The Omonoia organization put the number at 287,000 after their so called "Greek census" in 2013. This census is not recognised by the Albanian government. As of 2022, the number of Albanian citizens who are holders of special IDs as homogeneis (Greek co-ethnics) has been reduced to 13,329.

=== North America ===
A number of Greeks have migrated since the late 19th century to the Americas, and are generally integrated in the local Greek-American communities. The Pan-Epirotic Union of America, an organization which consists of 26 branches in various cities, according to its estimates counted nearly 30,000 Greeks in North America in 1919.

According to post-war sources, Greeks in America numbered over 15,000 families in 1965.

=== Australia ===
Greeks also emigrated to Australia, where they are active in raising political issues related to their motherland and the rights of the Greek populations still living there. The largest number of such persons are in the state of Victoria with further communities in the states of New South Wales and South Australia.

== Culture ==
=== Language ===
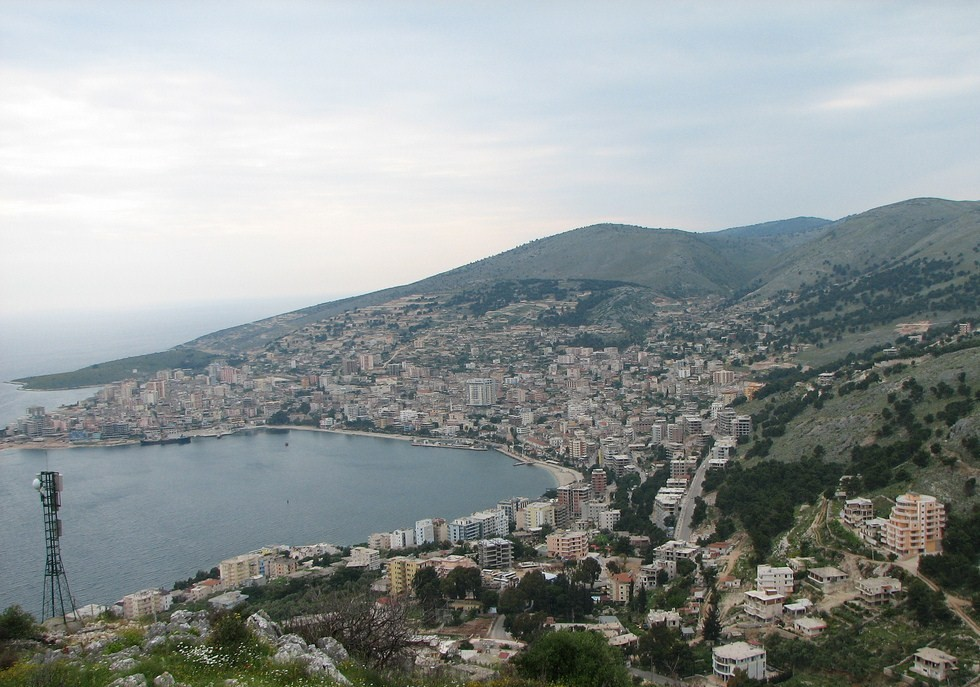
View of Saranda

The Greek dialects of Albania mainly belong to the branch of southern Greek dialects. In addition to Albanian loanwords, they retain some archaic forms and words that are no longer used in Standard Modern Greek, as well as in the Greek dialects of southern Epirus. Despite the relatively small distances between the various town and villages, there exists some dialectal variation, most noticeably in accent. Though Northern Epirote is a southern dialect, it is located far north of the reduced unstressed vowel system isogloss with the archaic disyllabic -ea. Thus, the provenance of the dialect ultimately remains obscure.

The local Greek dialects (especially the idioms of Chimariotic and the Argyrokastritic) are a more conservative Greek idiom (similarly to that spoken in the Mani peninsula in Greece, and the Griko language of Apulia in Italy), because they were spoken by populations living under virtual autonomy during Ottoman rule due to the rugged nature of the region. Thus, separated from other Greek dialects, the Northern Epirote Greek dialects underwent slower evolution, preserving a more archaic and faithful picture of the medieval Greek vernacular. The isolation of Albania during the years of communist rule, which separated the Greeks living in Albania from other Greek communities, also contributed to the slower evolution and differentiation of the local Greek dialects.

The Greek dialect in Nartë and Zvërnec is characterized by northern vocalism. It is conservative, and has some isoglosses with the Greek dialects of southern Italy, the Ionian Islands, Epirus, but also with more distant Greek-speaking regions such as Cyprus, Thrace and Asia Minor.

A decent command of Albanian is also common amongst the Greek minority; almost all Greeks who have grown up and are living in Albania are bilingual.

=== Music ===
Epirote' folk music from this region has several unique features not found in the rest of the Greek world. Singers from the Pogon region (as well as in the Greek part of Upper Pogoni) perform a style of polyphony that is characterized by a pentatonic structure, and also appears in the music of nearby Albanian and Aromanian populations. Another type of polyphonic singing in the region seems to have features in common with the lament songs (Greek: Μοιρολόγια) sung in some parts of Greece. The female lament singing of Greeks in Albania is similar in nature and performance with that of the Mani peninsula in Greece. In recent years there has been a growing interest in polyphonic music from this region, most notably by the musician Kostas Lolis, born near Sopik in Albania but now lives in Ioannina, in Greece.

=== Religion ===
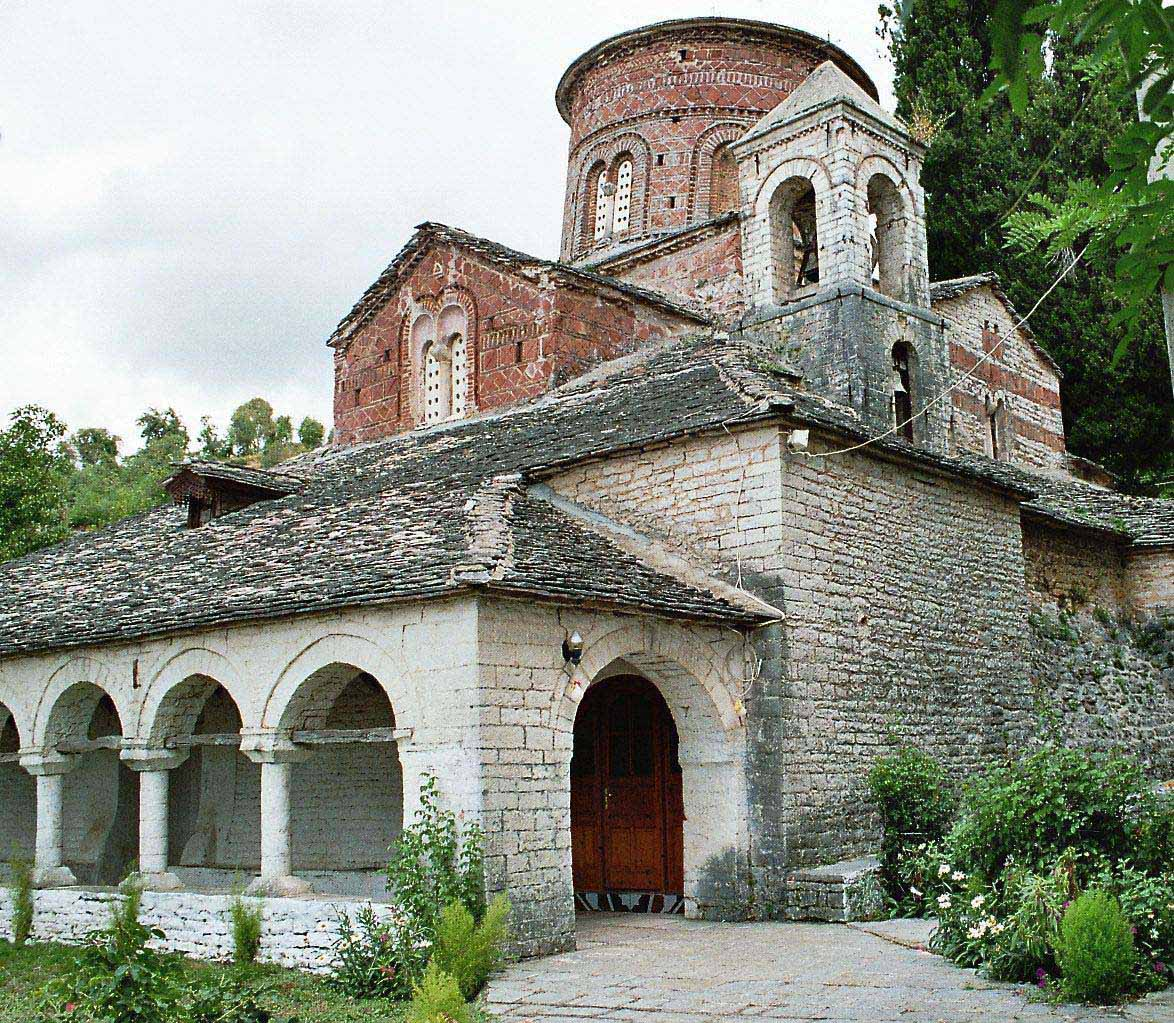
Dormition of the Theotokos Church, Labovë e Kryqit, a pilgrimage site. The present form of the church was built in the 10th century and was renovated several times after.

Christianity spread in the late Roman Empire, and throughout much of Medieval and Modern history, the Christian faith has been a significant part of the identity of Greeks in what became Albania and elsewhere. After the Great Schism, Albania was divided between the Western (Catholic) and Eastern (Orthodox) rites, with much of the Southern regions where Greeks resided being loyal to the Orthodox rite. During the Ottoman era, the Orthodox population, to which most Greeks belonged, was treated according to the Ottoman millet system which privileged Muslims and disadvantaged Christians as second class citizens who received fewer political, social, and economic rights. Orthodox Christianity during the Ottoman period remained dominant in many areas and became an important reason for preserving the Greek language, which was also the language of trade. In Himara, during part of this period, the local Greek population were Catholics of the Eastern rite due to alliances with Western and Catholic European powers, although they reverted to Greek Orthodoxy ultimately. Greek-Orthodox missionary Cosmas of Aetolia traveled across much of Southern Albania in a mission to preserve the Orthodox faith there, and was executed as a Russian agent in the process. Due to reforms in the late Ottoman Empire and its ultimate collapse, legal discrimination against Christians in favor of Muslims was reduced and ceased entirely in the late 19th and early 20th centuries.

Under the People's Republic of Albania, the Orthodox faith adhered to by most ethnic Greeks was banned entirely alongside the other religious faiths all over the country. The process started in 1949, with the confiscation and nationalisation of Church property and further intensified in 1967, when the state launched its atheistic campaign. However, some private practice managed to survive. This campaign was also part of the state persecution against the identity of the Greek people; as many of their traditions were closely related to Eastern Christianity.

The ban was lifted in 1990 just in time for Christians to observe traditional Christmas rites. Thus, one of the first Orthodox masses was celebrated in the town of Dervican on 16 December of that year.

== Education ==
=== Ottoman era ===
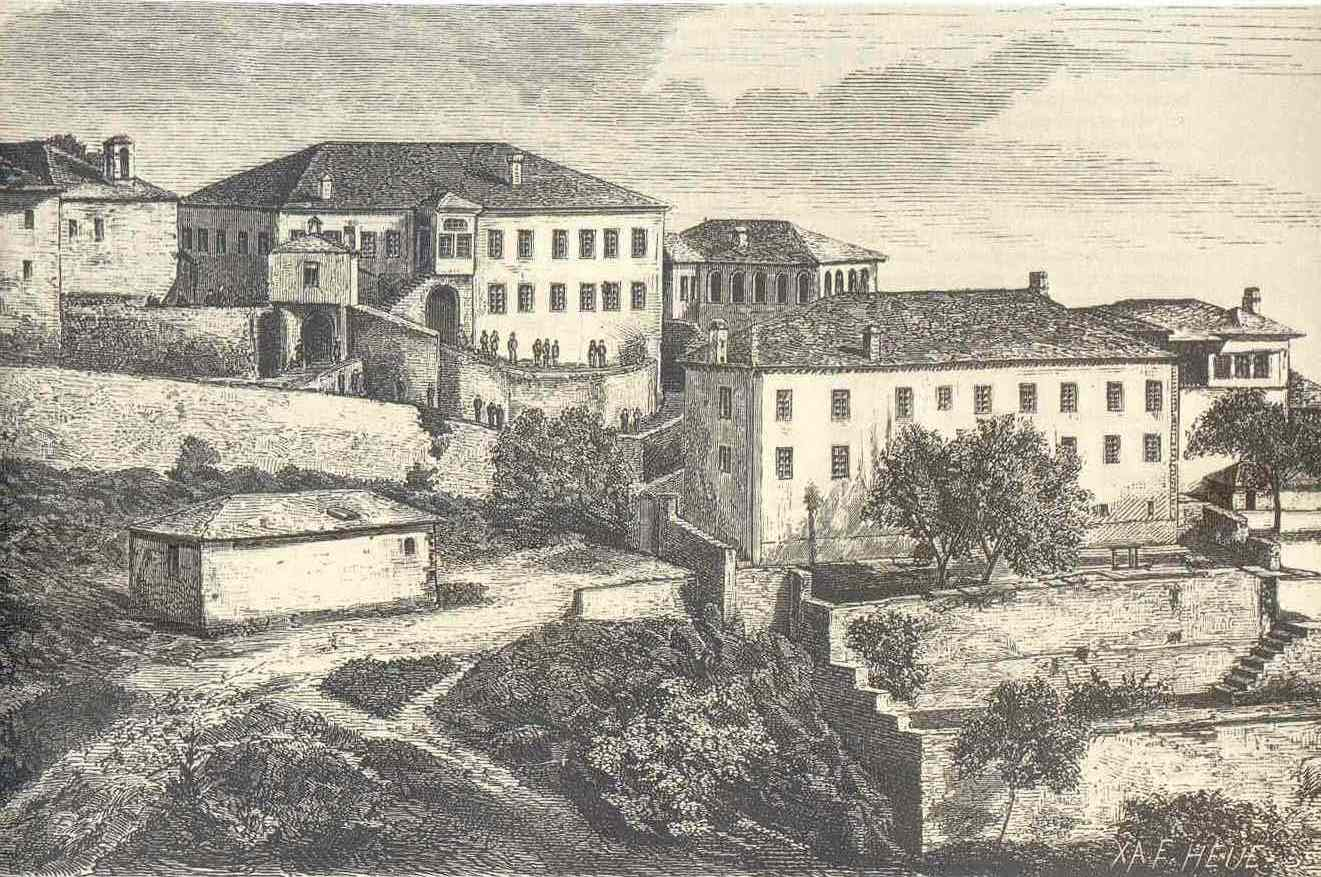
The Zographeion College facilities (1881) in Qestorati

During the first period of Ottoman occupation, illiteracy was a main characteristic of the wider Balkan region, but contrary to that situation, Epirus was not negatively affected. Along with the tolerance of the Turkish rulers and the desires of wealthy Epirote emigrants in the diaspora, many schools were established.

The spiritual and ethnic contribution of the monastery schools in Epirus such as Katsimani (near Butrint), Drianou (in Droviani), Kamenas (in Delvina) and St. Athanasios in Poliçani (13th-17th century) was significant. The first Greek-language school in Delvine was founded in 1537, when the town was still under Venetian control, while in Gjirokastër a Greek school was founded in 1633. The most important impetus for the creation of schools and the development of Greek education was given by the Orthodox missionary Cosmas of Aetolia together with the Aromanian Nektarios Terpos from Moscopole. Cosmas the Aetolian founded the Acroceraunian School, harkening back to the region's name in classical antiquity, in the town of Himara in 1770.

In Moscopole, an educational institution known as the "New Academy" (Greek: Νέα Ακαδημία) and an extensive library were established during the 18th century. A local monk founded in 1731 the first printing house in the Balkans (second only to that of Constantinople). However, after the destruction of Moscopole (1769), the center of Greek education in the region moved to nearby Korçë.

In the late 19th century, the wealthy banker Christakis Zografos founded the Zographeion College in his hometown of Qestorat, in the region of Lunxhëri. Many of the educated men that supported Greek culture and education in the region, then the culture of the Orthodox Patriarchate, were Aromanians by origin. In 1905, Greek education was flourishing in the region, as the entire Orthodox population, including Orthodox Albanians, were educated in Greek schools. On the other hand, the opening of Albanian schools had been prohibited by the Ottoman Porte and contrasted by the Constantinople Patriarchate and local Greek clercs as they feared that educated Albanians could contribute to the Albanian national consciusness.

=== 20th century Albania (1912–1991) ===
When the state of Albania gained its independence in 1912, the educational rights of the Greek communities in Albanian territory were granted by the Protocol of Corfu (1914) and with the statement of Albania's representatives in the League of Nations (1921). However, under a policy of assimilation, the Greek schools (there were over 360 until 1913) were gradually forced to close and Greek education was virtually eliminated by 1934. Following the intervention by the League of Nations, a limited number of schools, only those inside the "official minority zones", were reopened.

During the years of the communist regime, Greek education was also limited to the so-called "minority zone", and even then pupils were taught only Albanian history and culture at the primary level. If a few Albanian families moved into a town or village, the minority's right to be educated in Greek and publish in Greek newspapers was revoked.

=== Post cold war period (1991–present) ===
One of the major issues between the Albanian government and the Greek minority in Albania is that of education and the need for more Greek-language schools, due to overcrowded classrooms and unfulfilled demand. In addition, the Greek minority demands that Greek language education be made available outside the "official minority zones". In 2006, the establishment of a Greek-language university in Gjirokastër was agreed upon after discussions between the Albanian and Greek government. Also in 2006, after years of unanswered demands by the local community, a private Greek-language school opened in the town of Himarë, at the precise location where the Orthodox missionary Cosmas the Aetolian founded the Acroceraunian School. The school currently has five teachers and 115 pupils. The Albanian government systematically persecutes Greek communities using mandatory demolition orders, further provocation has come on issuing the demolition orders on Greek national holidays. These are often under the proviso of development but only effect ethnic Greeks and restrict and target educational buildings.

=== Benefaction ===
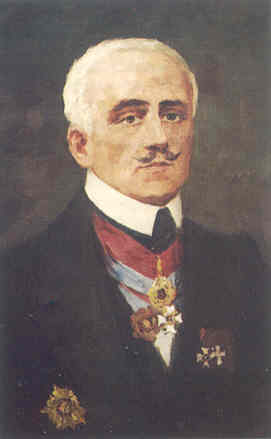
Evangelos Zappas

A number of people from the prosperous Greek diaspora of the 18th-19th centuries made significant contributions not only to their homeland, but also to the Greek state and to the Greek world under Ottoman Turkish domination. They donated fortunes for the construction of educational, cultural and social institutions. The Sinas family supported the expansion of the University of Athens and sponsored the foundation of the National Observatory. Ioannis Pangas from Korcë gave all of his wealth for educational purposes in Greece. The Zappas brothers, Evangelos and Konstantinos, endowed Athens with an ancient Greek-style marble stadium (the Kallimarmaro) that has hosted Olympic Games in 1870, 1875, 1896, 1906 and 2004, and the Zappeion exhibition center. The Zappas brothers also founded a number of hospitals and schools in Athens and Constantinople. Christakis Zografos in the Ottoman capital offered vast amounts of money for the establishments of two Greek schools (one for boys, known as Zographeion Lyceum, as well as one for girls), and a hospital.

== Organizations ==
=== Albania ===
During the years of communist rule, any form of organization by minorities was prohibited. In 1991, when the communist regime collapsed, the political organization Omonoia (Greek: Ομόνοια) was founded, in the town of Dervican by representatives of the Greek minority. The organization has four affiliates, in Sarandë, Delvinë, Gjirokastër and Tirana, and sub-sections in Korçë, Vlorë and Përmet. Its leading forum is the General Council consisting of 45 members, which is elected by the General Conference held every two years.

The Chair of Omonoia called for the autonomy of Northern Epirus in 1991, on the basis that the rights of the minority under the Albanian constitution were highly precarious. This proposal was rejected and thereby spurred the organization's radical wing to "call for Union with Greece".

Omonoia was banned from the parliamentary elections of March 1991 on the grounds that it violated an Albanian law forbidding the "formation of parties on a religious, ethnic and regional basis". This situation was contested during the following elections on behalf of Omonoia by the Unity for Human Rights Party – a party which represents the Greek minority in the Albanian parliament. Omonoia still exists as an umbrella social and political organization, and represents approximately 100,000 to 150,000 ethnic Greeks.

Omonoia has been the center of more than one political controversy in Albania. A major political controversy erupted in 1994 when five ethnic Greek members of Omonoia were arrested, investigated, and tried for treason. Their arrest was substantially marred by procedural shortcomings in the search of their homes and offices, their detention, and their trial. None of the arrestees had access to legal counsel during their initial detention. Four of the five ethnic Greek members of Omonoia stated that, during their detention, authorities subjected them to physical and psychological pressure, including beatings, sleep deprivation, and threats of torture. The Albanian Government rejected these claims. The five ethnic Greeks also complained of lack of access to their families during the first 3 months of their 4-month investigation. During their trial, a demonstration by a group of about 100 Greek lawyers, journalists, and ethnic Greek citizens of Albania took place outside the courthouse. The Albanian Police violently broke up the protest and detained about 20 lawyers and journalists. The members of Omonoia were eventually sentenced to 6 to 8-year prison terms, which were subsequently reduced on appeal.

=== North America ===
The Panepirotic Federation of America (Greek: Πανηπειρωτική Ομοσπονδία Αμερικής) was founded in Worcester, Massachusetts, in 1942, by Greek immigrants from Epirus (both from the Greek and Albanian part). One of the organization's main goals has been the protection of the human rights of the Greek minority in Albania and to call on the Albanian Government to enhance its full acceptance within the community of responsible nations by restoring to the Greek minority its educational, religious, political, linguistic and cultural rights due them under bilateral and international agreements signed by Albania's representatives since the country was created in 1913, including the right to declare their ethnic and religious affiliation in a census monitored by international observers.

== Notable people ==
=== Academics ===
- Charles Moskos (1934–2008), sociologist and professor
- Vasileios Ioannidis (1869–1963), theologian
- Tasos Vidouris (1888–1967), professor and poet

=== Literature and art ===
- Stavrianos Vistiaris, 16th century poet
- Kosmas Thesprotos (1780–1852)
- Konstantinos Skenderis, journalist, author and member of the Greek Parliament (1915–1917) for the Korytsa Prefecture
- Theophrastos Georgiadis (1885–1973), author
- Katina Papa (1903–1959), author
- Michele Greco da Valona, 15th–16th century painter.
- Michael Vasileiou, entrepreneur and scholar
- Konstantinos Kalymnios, poet
- Takis Tsiakos (1909–1997), poet
- Rita Wilson, actress and producer
- Laert Vasili, actor and director

=== Military/resistance ===
- Konstantinos Lagoumitzis (1781–1827), revolutionary
- Kyriakoulis Argyrokastritis (d. 1828), revolutionary
- Michail Spyromilios (1800–1880), army General, military advisor and politician
- Constantine Mesopotamites 12th–13th century Byzantine official
- Zachos Milios (1805–1860), army officer
- Ioannis Poutetsis (1878–1912), revolutionary
- Spyros Spyromilios (1864–1930), Gendarmerie officer
- Dimitrios Doulis (1865–1928), army officer, minister of military affairs of the Autonomous Rep. of Northern Epirus
- Nikolaos Dailakis (c. 1883 – 1941), revolutionary of the Macedonian Struggle
- Vasilios Sahinis (1897–1943), leader of the Northern Epirote resistance (1942–1943)

=== Philanthropy ===
- Alexandros Vasileiou (1760–1818)
- Apostolos Arsakis (1792–1874)
- Evangelis Zappas (1800–1865)
- Konstantinos Zappas (1814–1892)
- Ioannis Pangas (1814–1895)
- Georgios Sinas (1783–1856)
- Simon Sinas (1810–1876)
- Christakis Zografos (1820–1896)

=== Politics ===
- Thanasis Vagias (1765–1834), counselor of Ali Pasha
- Kyriakos Kyritsis, lawyer and member of the Greek Parliament (1915–1917) for the Argyrokastron Prefecture
- Petros Zappas, member of the Greek Parliament (1915–1917) for the Argyrokastron Prefecture
- Georgios Christakis-Zografos (1863–1920), diplomat, president of the Provisional Government of Northern Epirus (1914)
- Themistoklis Bamichas (1875–1930), politician
- Mihal Kasso, politician
- Spiro Koleka (1908–2001), long-serving member of the Politburo of the Party of Labour of Albania, one of the few members of the Greek minority serving in the political system of the Socialist People's Republic of Albania
- Kiço Mustaqi (1938-2019), last chief of general staff in communist Albania
- George Tenet (b. 1953), former Director of CIA, of Himariot origin
- Vasil Bollano (b. 1958), present chairman of Omonoia
- Spiro Ksera (b. 1967), former Minister of Labor, Social Affairs and Equal Opportunities of Albania and ex prefect of Gjirokastër County
- Fredis Beleris (b. 1972), MEP of Greece

=== Religion ===
- Sophianos (d. 1711), bishop of Dryinoupolis and scholar, from Poliçan
- Vasileios of Dryinoupolis (1858–1936), bishop and member of the provisional government of Northern Epirus (1914)
- Ioakeim Martianos (1875–1955), bishop and author, from Moscopole
- Panteleimon Kotokos (1890–1969), bishop of Gjirokastër (1937–1941), from Korçë
- Niphon of Kafsokalyvia (1316–1411), Greek Christian Orthodox saint and monk.
- Eulogios Kourilas Lauriotis (1880–1961), Orthodox bishop of Korce and activist of the Northern Epirus movement.

=== Sports ===
- Pyrros Dimas, Greek weight-lifer, Olympic medalist, born in Himarë
- Panajot Pano (1939–2010), footballer of Greek origin, born in Durrës
- Ledio Pano, footballer of Greek origin
- Sotiris Ninis, Greek footballer, born in Himarë
- Andreas Tatos, Greek footballer, born in Himarë

== See also ==
- Albania–Greece relations
- Albanians in Greece
- Arvanites
- Protocol of Corfu
- Demographics of Albania
- Thanas Ziko Battalion
