= Maliçan =

Maliçan Μάλτσιανη
- Village
- Location within Albania
- Coordinates: 39°48′53″N 20°13′47″E
- Country: Albania
- County: Vlorë
- Municipality: Finiq
- Elevation: 751 m (2,464 ft)
- Time zone: UTC+1 (CET)
  - Summer (DST): UTC+2 (CEST)

Maliçan (Albanian definite form: Maliçani, Greek: Μάλτσιανη; romanized: Máltsiani) is a small village in Vlorë County, southern Albania. At the 2015 local government reform it became part of the municipality of Finiq.

== Name ==
Linguist Yordan Zaimov derives the toponym from a village name, Малка, Malka (small), in reference to a долина, dolina (valley) and the suffix -яне, -yane with the Slavic sound change of k and y into ch.

== History ==
The village has around 16 churches (most ruined), with the most known being the Church of Panagia, dating back to the end of the 16th century. Stavrianos Vistiaris, a poet was possibly born in Maliçan, in the 16th or 17th century.

In the late 19th century, the village belonged to the kaza of Delvinë. In April 1944 the village was burned by the Germans.

== Demographics ==
According to Ottoman statistics, the village had 148 inhabitants in 1895. The village is inhabited by Greeks and the population was 295 in 1992.
