= Dimitrios Doulis =

Greek Army officer (1865-1928)

- Δημήτριος Δούλης
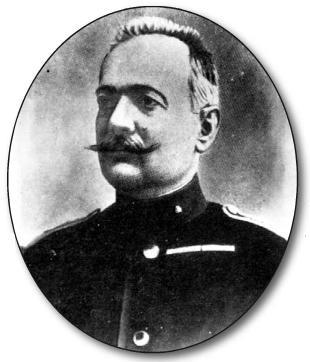
- Demetrios Doulis in uniform.
- Born: 1865; Nivica, Janina Vilayet, Ottoman Empire (now Albania)
- Died: 1928 (aged 62–63); Athens, Second Hellenic Republic
- Relatives: Nikolaos Doulis (father); Kitsos Doulis
- Military career
- Allegiance: Kingdom of Greece (1883–1914, 1914–1915); Aut. Rep. Northern Epirus (February–October 1914)
- Branch: Hellenic Army
- Service years: 1883–1915
- Rank: Colonel
- Conflicts: Greco-Turkish War (1897); Balkan Wars: First Balkan War; Second Balkan War; Northern Epirote Struggle
- Other work: Minister of Military Affairs of the Aut. Rep. of Northern Epirus (1914); Member of the Greek Parliament (1915–1917)

Dimitrios Doulis (Greek: Δημήτριος Δούλης, 1865–1928), was a Greek military office, minister of Defence of the Autonomous Republic of Northern Epirus. He was from Nivica in modern southern Albania.

== Military career ==
Doulis was born in 1865, son of Nikolaos Doulis and descendant of Kitsos Doulis, a hero of the Greek War of Independence against the Ottoman Empire (1821–30).

In 1883 he enlisted in the Hellenic Army as a volunteer. After studies in the NCO Military School, he was commissioned as an infantry second lieutenant on 20 August 1888. He fought in the Greco-Turkish War of 1897, and was promoted to lieutenant on 19 April 1898, captain II class on 31 December 1904, and captain I class on 18 January 1907.

He participated in the Balkan Wars of 1912–1913 as a major (promoted just before the war's outbreak, on 16 September 1912). During the First Balkan War, he commanded the 3rd Battalion of the 15th Infantry Regiment on the Epirus front. He captured Preveza and fought in the Battle of Bizani. In the Second Balkan War, he fought in the area of Nevrokopi, being wounded during the Battle of Predel Han on 17 July 1913.

== In Northern Epirus ==
After the war's end, he was promoted to lieutenant colonel on 25 September 1913, and made commander of the 26th Infantry Regiment, then based in his native district of Delvino and Himara.

During the Balkan Wars, the Hellenic Army had occupied the region of Northern Epirus, and Doulis was appointed military commander of Argyrokastro. In December 1913 however, with the Protocol of Florence, the Great Powers decided to award the region to the newly formed Albanian state. This decision was highly unpopular among the local Greek population, who decided to form their own government and military in order to secure their autonomy. Doulis resigned his commission in the Hellenic Army and joined the autonomists.

With the official declaration of the Autonomous Republic of Northern Epirus, on 18 February 1914, he was appointed to the post of Minister of Military Affairs and head of the army of the new government. From the first days he managed to mobilize an army consisting of more than 5,000 volunteer troops, and organize local gendarmerie units (called "Sacred Bands") in order to secure the region. Until May 17 (New Style), when the Protocol of Corfu was signed, the autonomist Epirote forces managed retain their positions and push back the attacks of Albanian irregulars and gendarmerie, which was under the command of Dutch officers.

When World War I broke out, the Greek forces, after approval from the Triple Entente Powers, re-entered Northern Epirus. In the subsequent legislative elections, Dimitrios Doulis was elected as member of the Greek parliament for the Argyrokastron Prefecture. On 25 April 1915, he was promoted to colonel, and retired from the army a few days after.

He died in Athens on 5 April 1928.
