= Northern Epirus =

Greek political term used to describe parts of southern Albania

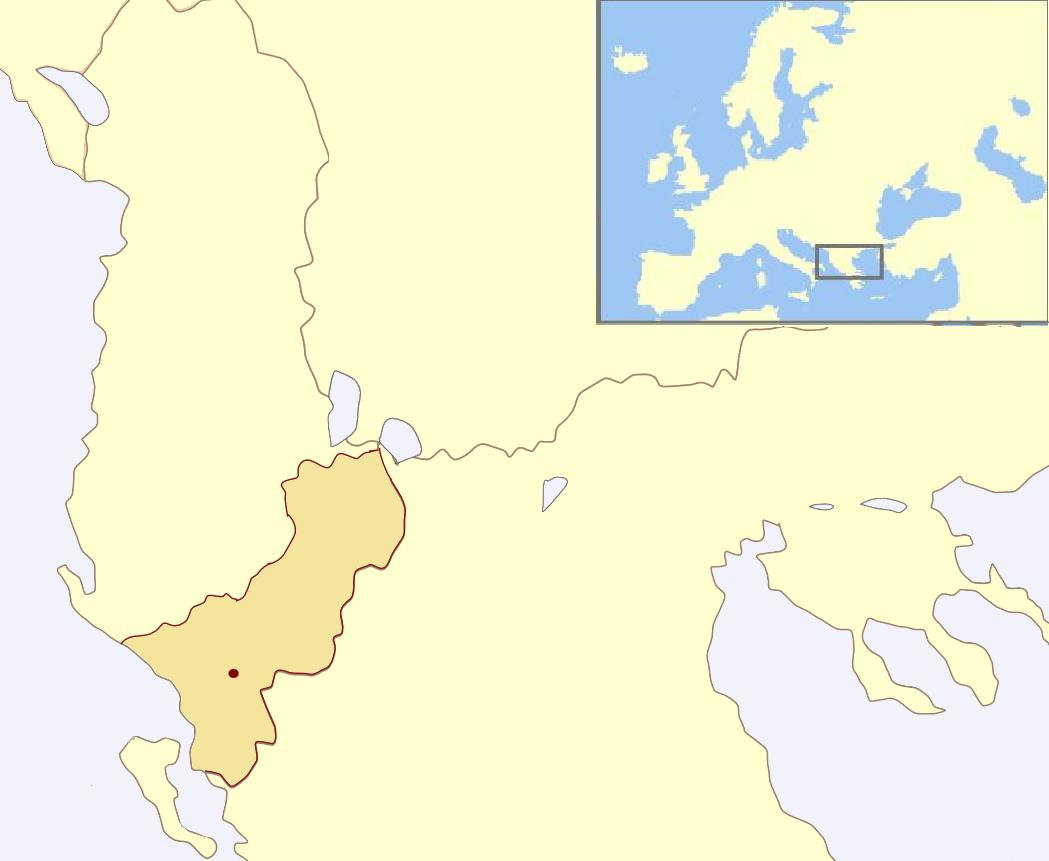
Territory claimed as part of Northern Epirus

Northern Epirus (Greek: Βόρεια Ήπειρος, Vóreia Ípeiros; Albanian: Epiri i Veriut) is a term used for specific parts of southern Albania which were first claimed by the Kingdom of Greece in the Balkan Wars and later were associated with the Greek minority in Albania and Greece-Albania diplomatic relations in the region. First used by Greece in 1913, upon the creation of the Albanian state following the Balkan Wars, it was originally used in a political and diplomatic context rather than a clearly defined geographical one. Today, the term is used mostly by Greeks and is associated with the existence of a substantial ethnic Greek minority in the region and had acquired in the past irredentist connotations (Autonomous Republic of Northern Epirus). (Note: "... northern Epirus (now southern Albania) with its substantial Greek minority")

With the outbreak of the First Balkan War (1912–13) and the Ottoman defeat, the Greek army entered the region and claimed it. The term started to be used by the Kingdom of Greece in 1913, upon the creation of the Albanian state following the Balkan Wars, and the area's incorporation into the latter. During this period, the Greek Army and Greece-backed irregulars used violence against local Albanians and have been accused of atrocities against civilians. In the spring of 1914, the Autonomous Republic of Northern Epirus was proclaimed by ethnic Greeks and pro-Greek parts of the population with official support by Greece and recognized by the Albanian government, though it proved short-lived as the First World War started. Greece held the area between 1914 and 1916 and unsuccessfully tried to annex it in March 1916. In 1917 Greek forces were driven from the area by Italy, in accordance with a general consensus in the Entente, and as a result Italy took over most of southern Albania and part of northwestern Greece. The Paris Peace Conference of 1919 awarded the area to Greece, however the area reverted to Albanian control in November 1921, following Greece's defeat in the Greco-Turkish War and local politics like the creation of the Albanian Autonomous Province of Korçë under French-Albanian administration. During the interwar period, Greece and Albania followed a détente while Greece officially recognized Albanian control over the region and focused more on promoting minority rights for Greek language and culture. The situation of the Greeks in Albania during this period was influenced by the fluctuations in the relations between the two countries, which was also linked with Greece's treatment of its Cham minority.

Following Italy's invasion of Greece from the territory of Albania in 1940 and the successful Greek counterattack, the Greek army briefly held the region for a six-month period until the German invasion of Greece in 1941. In 1941-1944, many Greeks in Albania, in particular from Dropull and Finiq, participated in the Albanian national-liberation struggle against the Nazi occupation and many individuals like Kiço Mustaqi, the last Minister of Defence of the Communist era in Albania, were later part of the upper administrative class of the one-party state established by Enver Hoxha. Tensions with Greece remained high during the Cold War, largely due to Greece's territorial claims and its claims about the treatment of the Greek minority. A Greek minority area was recognized by the Hoxha regime, which followed the pre-war delimitation of the minority areas consisting of 99 villages but leaving out three villages in the Himara region which were previously included in the minority area by King Zog of Albania. People outside the official minority zone received no education in the Greek language, which remained a point of contention until the post-Communist period when it was resolved.

In 1984, during a speech in the Greek region of Epirus, the Greek PM Andreas Papandreou declared that the inviolability of European borders as stipulated in the Helsinki Final Act of 1975, to which Greece was a signatory, applied to the Greek-Albanian border. The most significant change occurred on 28 August 1987, when the Greek Cabinet lifted the state of war that had been declared since November 1940. In 1996 Greece and Albania signed a Treaty of Friendship, Cooperation, Good Neighborliness and Security, which brought an official ending to the Northern Epirus issue for Greece. Peripheral segments in Greece and, particularly, in the Greek Diaspora continue to push the Northern Epirus thesis and maintain an online populist discourse. In the 21st century, education in Greek is available throughout Albania without any geographical limitation, although the property rights of the Greek minority remain an issue.

== Name and definition ==
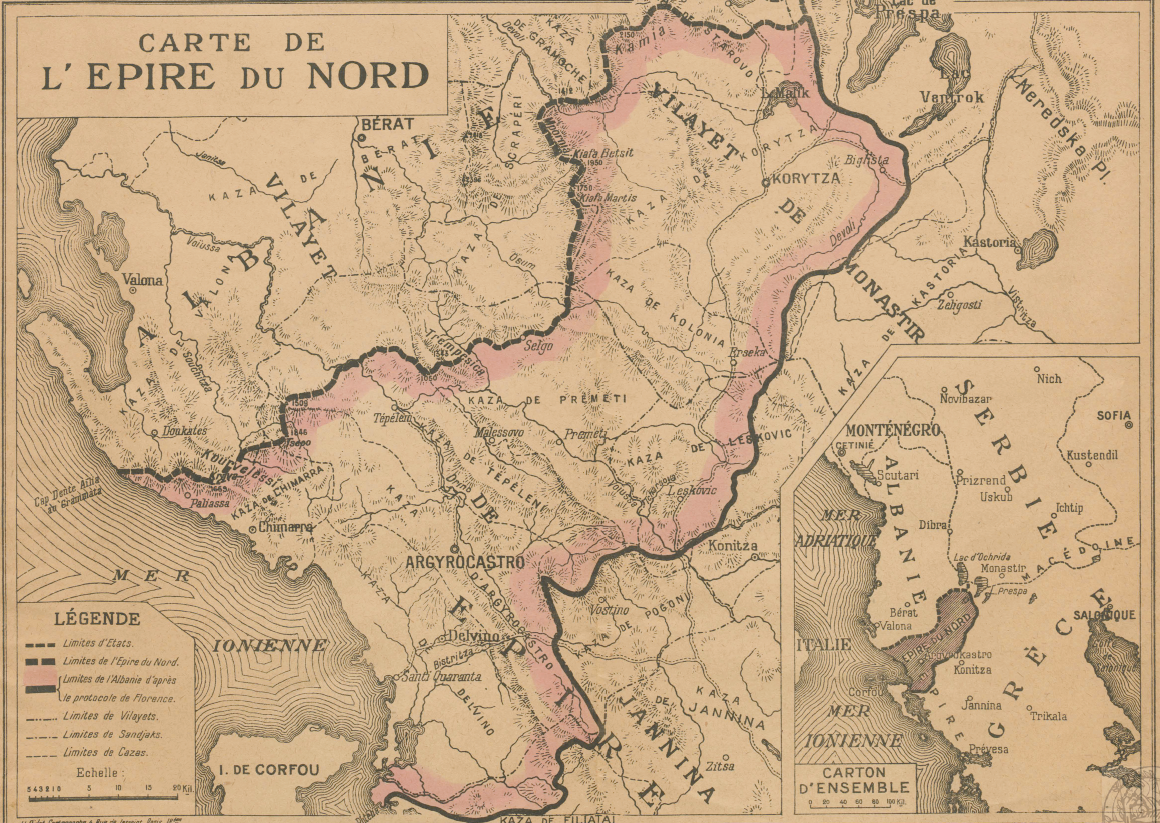
Map of Northern Epirus presented to the Paris Peace Conference of 1919, by the exiled provisional government of Northern Epirus.

The Greek toponym Epirus (Greek: Ήπειρος), meaning "mainland" or "continent", first appears in the work of Hecataeus of Miletus in the 6th century BC and is one of the few Greek names from the view of an external observer with a maritime-geographical perspective. Although not originally a native Epirote name, it later came to be adopted by the inhabitants of the area. The term Epirus is used both in the Albanian and Greek language, but in Albanian refers only to the historical and not the modern region. The term Northern Epirus rather than a clearly defined geographical term, is a political and diplomatic term applied to southern Albania. (Note: "This area called 'Northern Epirus' by many Greeks, is regarded as geographically, historically, ethnologically and culturally connected with the northern Greek territory of Epirus since antiquity ... The term 'Northern Epirus' (which Albania rejects as irredentist) started to be used by Greece around 1913.") In other words, it is the territory of southern Albania that Greece tried to annex in the 1913–1920 period. It is a term used only by Greeks, and it presupposes the existence of Southern Epirus, which is the part of Epirus under Greek sovereignty. The term "Northern Epirus" was first used in official Greek correspondence in 1886, to describe the northern parts of the Janina Vilayet. (Note: "χρησιμοποιεί τον όρο «Βόρειος Ήπειρος» ώστε να περιγράψει βόρειες περιοχές του βιλαετίου Ιωαννίνων, κυρίως του σαντζακίου Αργυροκάστρου, στις οποίες εκτεινόταν η δικαιοδοσία του. Είναι από τις πρώτες χρήσεις του όρου σε διπλωματικά έγγραφα..") The term started to be used by Greece in 1913, upon the creation of the Albanian state following the Balkan Wars, and the incorporation into the latter of territory that was regarded by many Greeks as geographically, historically, culturally, and ethnologically connected to the Greek region of Epirus since antiquity. In the 1913–1990s period, there were three Greek views about the definition of Northern Epirus. The most expansive one defined it as the territory up to the Shkumbin river; this includes about half of Albania and eight of its largest cities. Another definition, the middle position, includes the territory up to the Ceraunian Mountains in the north. The least expansive definition includes the southernmost tip of Albania, where the Greek population is overwhelming, especially in the officially recognized 99 Greek minority villages.

In antiquity, the northern border of the historical region of Epirus (and of the ancient Greek world) was the Gulf of Oricum, or alternatively, the mouth of the Aoös river, immediately to the north of the Bay of Aulon (modern-day Vlorë). (Note: "Appian's description of the Illyrian territories records a southern boundary with Chaonia and Thesprotia, where ancient Epirus began south of river Aous (Vjose).") The northern boundary of Epirus was unclear both due to political instability and the coexistence of Greek and non-Greek populations, notably Illyrians, such as in Apollonia. From the 4th century BCE onward, with a degree of certainty, the boundaries of Epirus included the Ceraunian mountains in the north, the Pindus mountains in the east, the Ionian Sea in the West, and the Ambracian Gulf in the south.

== History ==
=== Ottoman period ===
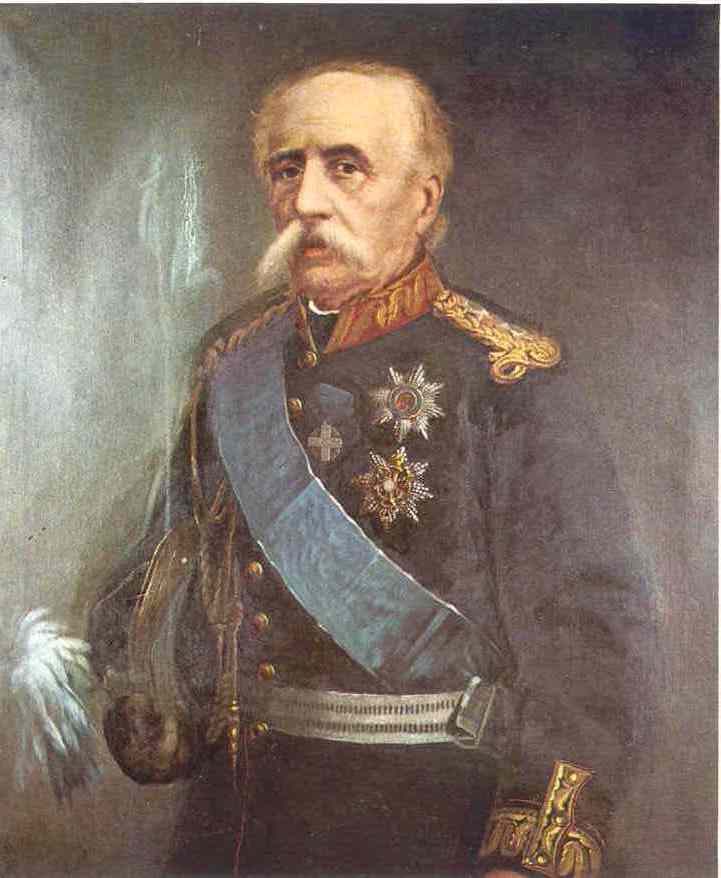
The Greek general Spyromilios, a native of Himara, fought for the incorporation of Epirus in Greece.

The local Ottoman authority was mainly exercised by Muslim Albanians. There were specific parts of Epirus that enjoyed local autonomy, such as Himarë, Droviani, or Moscopole. In spite of the Ottoman presence, Christianity prevailed in many areas and became an important reason for preserving the Greek language, which was also the language of trade. Between the 16th and 19th centuries, inhabitants of the region participated in the Greek Enlightenment. One of the leading figures of that period, the Orthodox missionary Cosmas of Aetolia, traveled and preached extensively in northern Epirus, founding the Acroceraunian School in Himara in 1770. It is believed that he founded more than 200 Greek schools until his execution by Turkish authorities near Berat. In addition, the Moscopole printing house, the first in the Balkans after that of Constantinople, was founded in Moscopole. From the mid-18th century trade in the region was thriving and a great number of educational facilities and institutions were founded throughout the rural regions and the major urban centers as benefactions by several Greek entrepreneurs of the region. In Korçë a special community fund was established that aimed at the foundation of Greek cultural institutions. In the late Ottoman period, Northern Epirus had 726 Greek schools with a total of 1,377 teachers and 22,741 students.

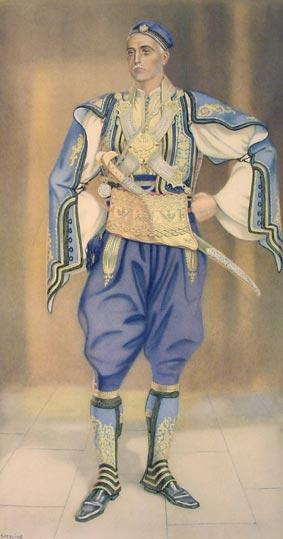
Greek Guerilla Chief from Northern Epirus in traditional costume

During this period a number of uprisings against the Ottoman Empire periodically broke out. In the Orlov Revolt (1770) several units of Riziotes, Chormovites and Himariotes supported the armed operation. Some Greeks from the area took also part in the Greek War of Independence (1821–1830): many locals revolted, organized armed groups and joined the revolution. The most distinguished personalities were the engineer Konstantinos Lagoumitzis from Hormovo and Spyromilios from Himarë. The latter was one of the most active generals of the revolutionaries and participated in several major armed conflicts, such as the Third Siege of Missolonghi, where Lagoumitzis was the defenders' chief engineer. Spyromilios also became a prominent political figure after the creation of the modern Greek state and discreetly supported the revolt of his compatriots in Ottoman-occupied Epirus in 1854. Another uprising in 1878, in the Saranda-Delvina region, with the revolutionaries demanding union with Greece, was suppressed by the Ottoman forces, while in 1881, the Treaty of Berlin awarded to Greece the southernmost parts of Epirus.

According to the Ottoman "Millet" system, religion was a major marker of ethnicity, and thus all Orthodox Christians (Greeks, Aromanians, Orthodox Albanians, Slavs etc.) were classified as "Greeks", while all Muslims (including Muslim Albanians, Greeks, Slavs etc.) were considered "Turks". However, 'Albanian' (Arnavud) was one of the few ethnic markers normally used, besides the regular religious labels, for the identification of people in official record of the Ottoman state. The mountainous country in the western Balkans which was inhabited by Albaians was referred to as 'Arnavudluk', including not only the area now forming the state of Albania but also neighbouring parts of Greece, Macedonia, Kosovo, and Montenegro. (Note: The ethnonym 'Albanian' (Arnavud) was used to denote "persons who spoke one of the dialects of Albanian, came from mountainous country in the western Balkans (referred to as 'Arnavudluk', and including not only the area now forming the state of Albania but also neighbouring parts of Greece, Macedonia, Kosovo, and Montenegro), organized society on the strength of blood ties (family, clan, tribe), engaged predominantly in a mix of settled agriculture and livestock herding, and were notable fighters — a group, in short, difficult to control".) The dominant view in Greece considers Orthodox Christianity an integral element of the Hellenic heritage, as part of its Byzantine past. (Note: "This figure seems to fill the huge gap between the figures concerning the Greek minority in Albania given by Albanian sources at about 60,000 and the Greek official statistics of 'Greeks' in Albania of 300–400,000. In the national Greek view, Hellenic cultural heritage is seen as passed on through Byzantine culture to the Greek Orthodox religion today. Religion, as a criterion of classification, automatically places all the Albanian Aromanians, and also those people who call themselves Albanian Orthodox, into the 'Greek minority'.") Thus, official Greek government policy from c. 1850 to c. 1950, adopted the view that speech was not a decisive factor for the establishment of a Greek national identity. (Note: "The fact that the Christian communities within the territory which was claimed by Greece from the mid 19th century until the year 1946, known after 1913 as Northern Epirus, spoke Albanian, Greek and Aromanian (Vlach), was dealt with by the adoption of two different policies by Greek state institutions. The first policy was to take measures to hide the language(s) the population spoke, as we have seen in the case of "Southern Epirus". The second was to put forth the argument that the language used by the population had no relation to their national affiliation. To this effect the state provided striking examples of Albanian speaking individuals (from southern Greece or the Souliotēs) who were leading figures in the Greek state. As we will discuss below, under the prevalent ideology in Greece at the time every Orthodox Christian was considered Greek, and conversely after 1913, when the territory which from then onwards was called "Northern Epirus" in Greece was ceded to Albania, every Muslim of that area was considered Albanian.")

=== Balkan Wars (1912–1913) ===
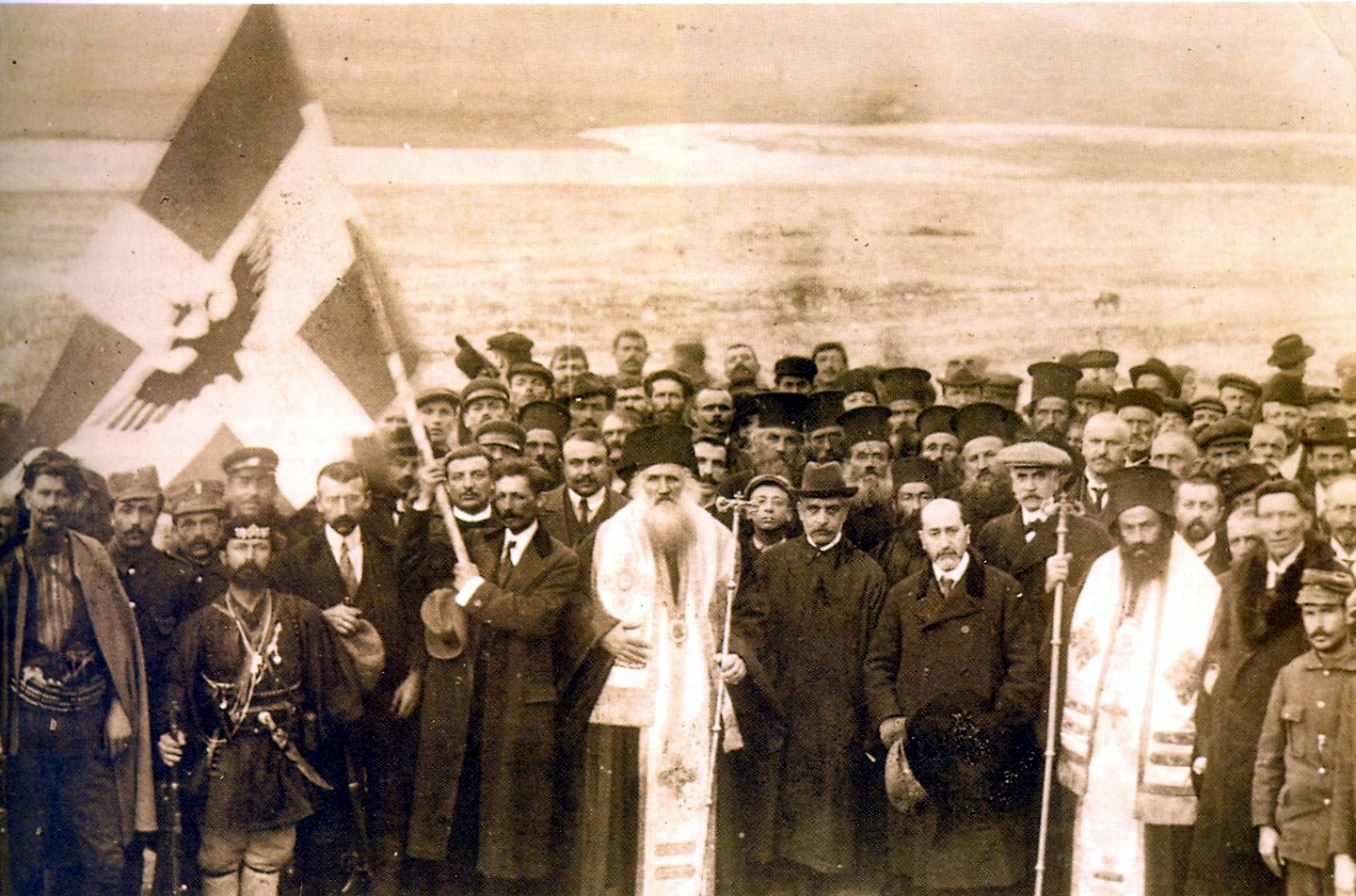
Picture of the official declaration of Northern Epirote Independence in Gjirokastër (1 March 1914).

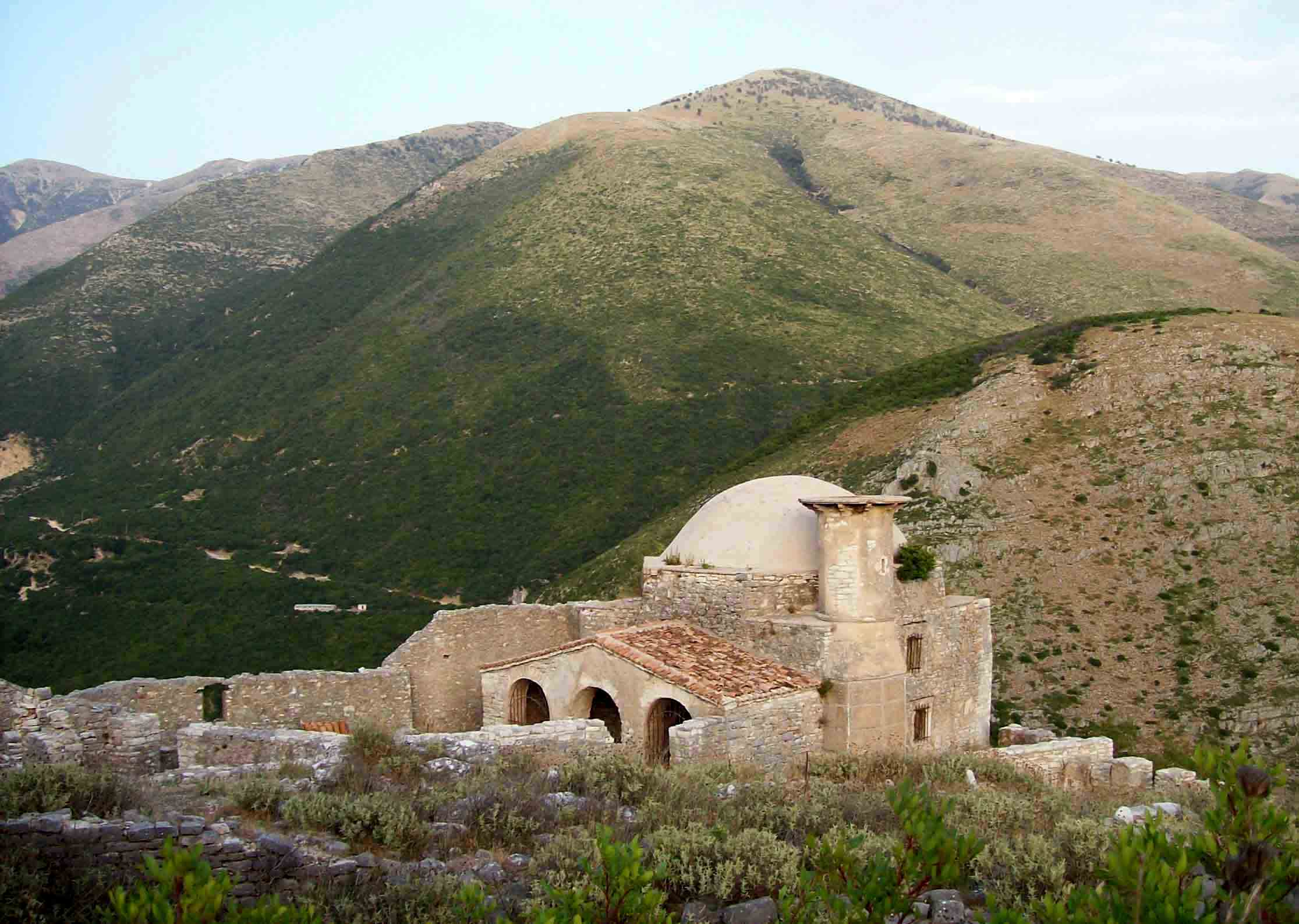
The Hajji Bendo Mosque in Borsh, which got ruined and its minaret destroyed during the Greek occupation

With the outbreak of the First Balkan War (1912–13) the Greek army entered the region. As a response to local Albanian resistance to the Greek army advance in Epirus, the Greek forces began executing irregulars and regularly killing prisoners; authorities also encouraged harsher actions against civilians. These measures were common by the time the Greek forces crossed the modern Greece-Albania border. According to an infantry officer, villagers were "mowed down like sparrows" and houses were being burnt down. The Greek Army committed atrocities and was involved in campaigns of violence. Greek soldiers targeted Christians who used Aromanian and Albanian in their religious services. At the same time, intercommunal violence broke out and Albanian nationalist paramilitary bands attacked Greek Orthodox communities.

After the Ottoman defeat, Greece claimed southern Albania, which it called "Northern Epirus", declaring implausibly that the majority of the population was Greek and with Greek national consciousness. In its calculations it counted all Orthodox Albanians and Aromanians as Greeks, though the Greeks numbered only 30,000 people. The outcome of the following Peace Treaty of London (Note: "In February 1913, Greek troops captured Ioannina, the capital of Epirus. The Turks recognised the gains of the Balkan allies by the Treaty of London of May 1913.") and Peace Treaty of Bucharest, (Note: "The Second Balkan War was of short duration and the Bulgarians were soon forced to the negotiating table. By the Treaty of Bucharest (August 1913) Bulgaria was obliged to accept a highly unfavorable territorial settlement, although she did retain an Aegean outlet at Dedeagatch (now Alexandroupolis in Greece). Greece's sovereignty over Crete was now recognized but her ambition to annex Northern Epirus, with its substantial Greek population, was thwarted by the incorporation of the region into an independent Albania.") signed at the end of the Second Balkan War, was unpopular among both Greeks and Albanians, as settlements of the two people existed on both sides of the border: the southern part of Epirus was ceded to Greece, while Northern Epirus, already under the control of the Greek army, was awarded to the newly found Albanian state. Due to the late emergence and fluidity of Albanian national identity and an absence of religious Albanian institutions, loyalty in Northern Epirus, especially amongst the Orthodox, to potential Albanian rule headed by (Albanian) Muslim leaders was not guaranteed. Greece saw the Orthodox Albanians as "less civilized Greeks" or "potentially Greeks". Regardless of earlier affinity, they were not Greeks. Orthodox Albanians had two main political views: those in Albania were influenced by Greece, and mostly supported union with Greece; while those in diaspora communities wanted an independent Albania from Turkey, though some favored forming a confederation with Greece because a separate state would be too weak.

=== Autonomous Republic of Northern Epirus (1914) ===
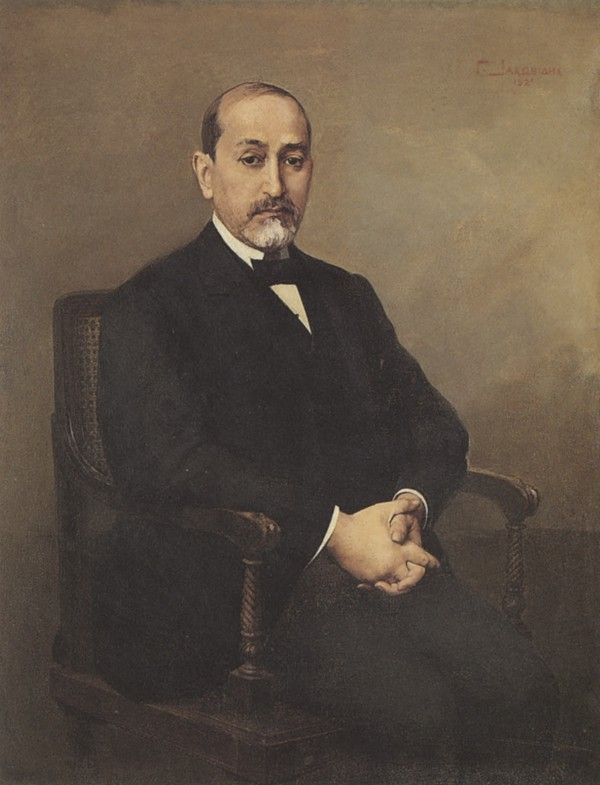
Georgios Christakis-Zografos, president of the Autonomous Republic of Northern Epirus

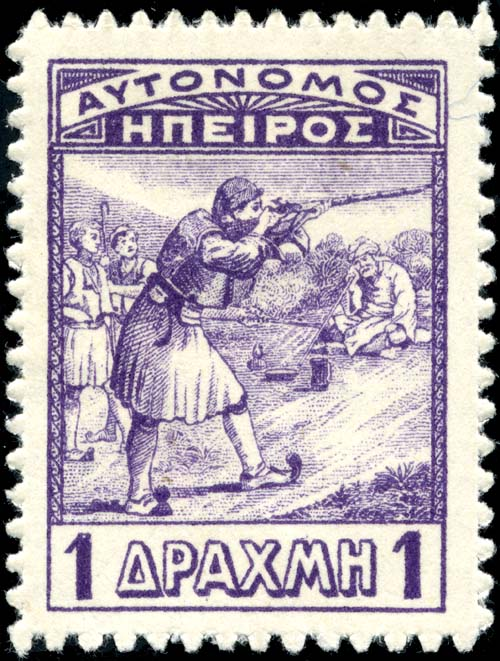
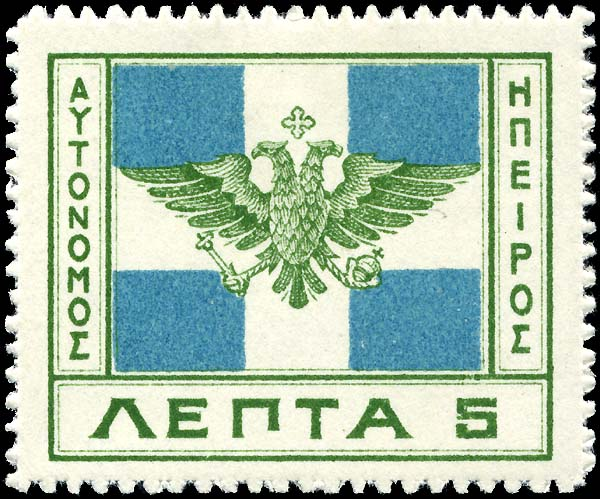
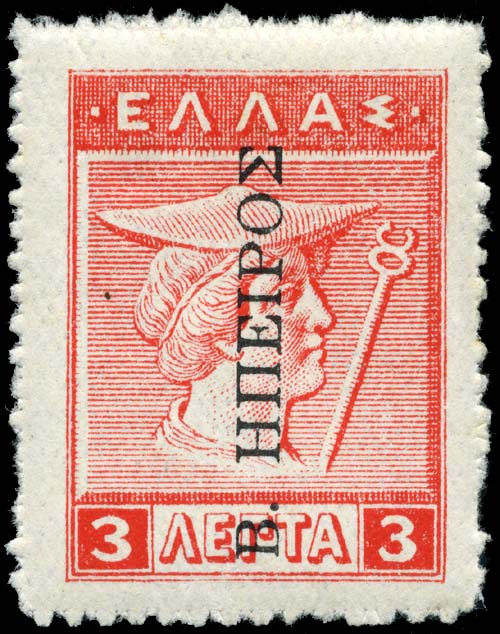
Postage stamps of the Autonomous Republic of Northern Epirus

In accordance with the wishes of the local Greek population, the Autonomous Republic of Northern Epirus, centered in Gjirokastër on account of the latter's large Greek population, was declared in March 1914 by the pro-Greek party, which was in power in southern Albania at that time. Georgios Christakis-Zografos, a distinguished Greek politician from Lunxhëri, took the initiative and became the head of the Republic. Fighting broke out in Northern Epirus between Greek irregulars and Muslim Albanians who opposed the Northern Epirot movement. (Note: "When the Greek army withdrew from Northern Epirot territories in accordance with the ruling of the Powers, a fierce struggle broke out between Muslim Albanians and Greek irregulars.") In May, autonomy was confirmed with the Protocol of Corfu, signed by Albanian and Northern Epirote representatives and approved by the Great Powers. The signing of the Protocol ensured that the region would have its own administration, recognized the rights of the local Greeks and provided self-government under nominal Albanian sovereignty.

However, the agreement was never fully implemented, because when World War I broke out in July, Albania collapsed. Although short-lived, (Note: "In May 1914, the Great Powers signed the Protocol of Corfu, which recognized the area as Greek, after which it was occupied by the Greek army from October 1914 until October 1915.") the Autonomous Republic of Northern Epirus left behind a substantial historical record, such as its own postage stamps.

=== World War I and following peace treaties (1914–1921) ===
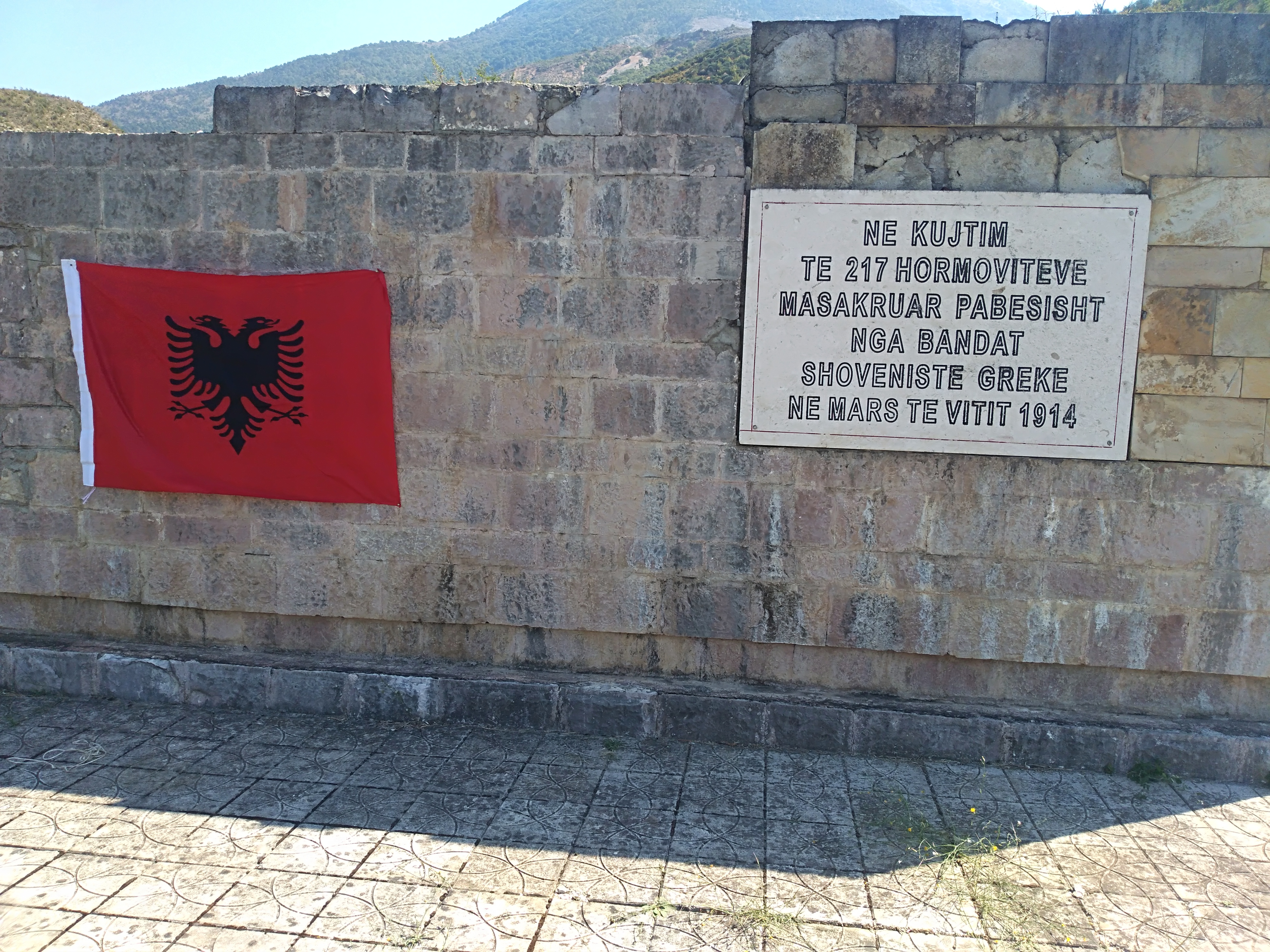
The memorial for the men massacred in Hormovë by Greek forces in 1914

Under an October 1914 agreement among the Allies, Greek forces re-entered Northern Epirus and the Italians seized the Vlore region. The Greek Army used violence against the Albanians, committing atrocities and massacres. Initially, the Greek administration received the full approval of the European Great Powers, due to the political chaos provoked by the collapse of the Albanian government and to prevent the resurgence of violence. Greece officially annexed Northern Epirus in March 1916, but was forced to revoke by the Great Powers. The situation under the Greek Army deteriorated, with thousands of Albanians dying of hunger, as livestock and food was forcefully taken from them and sent to Greece. The Allies, annoyed with the situation, decided to drive the Greek Army out of the region. During the war, the French Army occupied the area around Korçë in 1916, and established the Republic of Korçë. In 1917, Greece lost control of the rest of Northern Epirus to Italy, who by then had taken over most of Albania. The Paris Peace Conference of 1919 awarded the area to Greece, however, political developments such as the outcome of the elections of 1920 in Greece, the Greek defeat in the Greco-Turkish War (1919–22) and, crucially, Italian, Austrian and German lobbying in favor of Albania resulted in the area being ceded to Albania in November 1921. An international committee found that in southern Albania the Muslim and Christian communities each had around 113,000 people; the Greek population was around 35,000–40,000.

=== Interwar period (1921–1939) – Zog's regime ===
In the Interwar period, Greece did not abandon its claim on Northern Epirus, and concealed it under interest for the Greek minority. The Albanian Government, with the country's entrance to the League of Nations (October 1921), made the commitment to respect the social, educational, religious rights of every minority. Questions arose over the size of the Greek minority, with the Albanian government claiming 16,000, and the League of Nations estimating it at 35,000-40,000. In the event, only a limited area in the Districts of Gjirokastër, Sarandë and four villages in Himarë region consisting of 15,000 inhabitants was recognized as a Greek minority zone.

The situation of the Greeks in Albania was influenced by the fluctuations in the relations between the two countries, which was also linked with Greece's treatment of its Cham minority. The following years, measures were taken to suppress (Note: "Under King Zog, the Greek villages suffered considerable repression, including the forcible closure of Greek-language schools in 1933–34 and the ordering of Greek Orthodox monasteries to accept mentally sick individuals as inmates.") the minority's education. The Albanian state viewed Greek education as a potential threat to its territorial integrity, while most of the teaching staff was considered suspicious and in favour for the Northern Epirus movement. (Note: "Sederholm did add, however, that the Albanian government opposed the teaching of Greek in Albanian schools 'because it fears the influence of the teachers, the majority of whom have openly declared themselves in favour of the Pan—Epirot movement.'") In October 1921, the Albanian government recognised minority rights and legalised Greek schools only in Greek speaking settlements located within the "recognised minority zone". (Note: "Southern Albania, and particularly the Prefecture of Gjirokastër, was a sensitive region from this point of view, since the most wide—spread educational network there at the end of the Ottoman rule was that of the 'Greek schools', serving the Orthodox Christian population. Since the Albanian government recognised the rights of minorities as a member of the League of Nations in October 1921, these Greek schools were legalized, but only in Greek-speaking villages, and could continue to function or reopen (those that had been closed during the Italian occupation of 1916-1920). From the point of view of the state, the existence of Greek schools (of varied status and with private or publicly financed teachers)' represented a problem for the integration of the 'Greek-speaking minority' and more generally for the integration of the Orthodox Christians. They were the only non-Albanian schools remaining in the region after Albanian state schools (henceforth for Muslims and Christians alike) had replaced the 'Ottoman schools' in Muslim villages and the 'Greek schools' in Christian villages, while Aromanian (Kostelanik 1996) and Italian schools had been closed.") (Note: "Πιο συγκεκριμένα, στο προστατευτικό νομικό πλαίσιο της μειονότητας συμπεριλήφθηκαν μόνο οι Έλληνες που κατοικούσαν στις περιφέρειες Αργυροκάστρου και Αγίων Σαράντα και σε τρία από τα χωριά της Χιμάρας (Χιμάρα, ∆ρυμάδες και Παλάσσα), ενώ αποκλείστηκαν αυθαίρετα όσοι κατοικούσαν στην περιοχή της Κορυτσάς και στα υπόλοιπα τέσσερα χωριά της Χιμάρας Βούνο, Πήλιουρι, Κηπαρό και Κούδεσι, αλλά και όσοι κατοικούσαν στα μεγάλα αστικά κέντρα της 'μειονοτικής ζώνης', δηλαδή στο Αργυρόκαστρο, τους Άγιους Σαράντα και την Πρεμετή, πόλεις με μικτό βέβαια πληθυσμό αλλά εμφανή τον ελληνικό τους χαρακτήρα την εποχή εκείνη. Αυτό πρακτικά σήμαινε ότι για ένα μεγάλο τμήμα του ελληνικού στοιχείου της Αλβανίας δεν αναγνωρίζονταν ούτε τα στοιχειώδη εκείνα δικαιώματα που προέβλεπαν οι διεθνείς συνθήκες, ούτε βέβαια το δικαίωμα της εκπαίδευσης στη μητρική γλώσσα, που κυρίως μας ενδιαφέρει εδώ.") Within the rest of the country, Greek schools were either closed or forcibly converted to Albanian schools and teachers were expelled from the country. The relations further worsened in the 1923–1925 period, after Greece tried to include the Muslim Chams in the population exchange between Greece and Turkey. Zogu linked their status in Greece to the status of the Greeks in Albania, threatening to send the latter to Greece as a response. During the mid-1920s, attempts at opening Greek schools and teacher training colleges in urban areas with sizable Greek populations were met with difficulties which resulted in an absence of urban Greek schools in coming years. (Note: "Ιδιαίτερο ενδιαφέρον από ελληνικής πλευράς παρουσίαζαν οι πόλεις του Αργυροκάστρου, των Αγιών Σαράντα καιτης Κορυτσάς, γνωστά κέντρα του ελληνισμού της Αλβανίας, και στη συνέχεια η Πρεμετή και η Χιμάρα. ΘΘα πρέπει ίσως στο σημείο αυτό να θυμίσουμε ότι για του ςΈλληνες των αστικών κέντρων, με εξαίρεση τη χιμάρα, δεν αναγνωρίζοταν το καθεστώς του μειονοτικού ούτε τα δικαιώματα που απέρρεαν από αυτό.") (Note: "Ήδη από τις αρχές του σχολικού έτους 1925-26 ξεκίνησαν οι προσπάθειες για το άνοιγμα ενός σχολείου στους Άγιους Σαράντα, τους οποίους μάλιστα οι ελληνικές αρχές, σε αντίθεση με τις αλβανικές, δεν συγκατέλεγαν μεταξύ των 'αλβανόφωνων κοινοτήτων', καθώς ο ελληνικός χαρακτήρας της πόλης ήταν πασιφανής. Σε ό,τι αφορούσε το ελληνικό σχολείο της πόλης, η Επιτροπή επί των Εκπαιδευτικών σχεδίαζε να το οργανώσει σε διδασκαλείο, τοποθετώντας σε αυτό υψηλού επιπέδου και ικανό διδασκαλικό προσωπικό, ώστε να αποτελέσει σημαντικό πόλο έλξης για τα παιδιά της περιοχής, αλλά και παράδειγμα οργάνωσης και λειτουργίας σχολείου και για τις μικρότερες κοινότητες. Τις μεγαλύτερες ελπίδες για την επιτυχία των προσπαθειών της φαίνεται ότι στήριζε η Επιτροπή στην επιμονή του ελληνικού στοιχείου της πόλης, στην πλειοψηφία τους ευκατάστατοι έμποροι που θα ήταν διατεθειμένοι να προσφέρουν ακόμη και το κτίριο για τη λειτουργία του, αλλά και στην παρουσία και τη δραστηριοποίηση εκεί του ελληνικού υποπροξενείου 58 . Όλες οι προσπάθειες ωστόσο αποδείχθηκαν μάταιες και ελληνικό κοινοτικό σχολείο δεν λειτούργησε στην πόλη όχι μόνο το σχολικό έτος 1925-26, αλλά ούτε και τα επόμενα χρόνια.") With the intervention of the League of Nations in 1935, a limited number of schools, and only of those inside the officially recognized zone, were reopened. The 360 schools of the pre-World War I period were reduced dramatically in the following years and education in Greek was finally eliminated altogether in 1935: (Note: "Until the 1960s, Lunxhëri was mainly inhabited by Albanian-speaking Orthodox Christians called the Lunxhots. By then, and starting during and just after the Second World War, many of them had left their villages to settle in Gjirokastër and in the towns of central Albania, where living conditions and employment opportunities were considered better. They were replaced, from the end of the 1950s on, by Vlachs, forced by the regime to settle in agricultural cooperatives. Some Muslim families from Kurvelesh, in the mountainous area of Labëria, also came to Lunxhëri at the same time – in fact, many of them were employed as shepherds in the villages of Lunxhëri even before the Second World War. While Lunxhëri practiced (as did many other regions) a high level of (territorial) endogamy, marriage alliances started to occur between Christians Lunxhots and members of the Greek minority of the districts of Gjirokastër (Dropull, Pogon) and Sarandë. Such alliances were both encouraged by the regime and used by people to facilitate internal mobility and obtain a better status and life-chances." "The issue of a couple of new villages created during communism illustrates this case. The village of Asim Zenel, named after a partisan from Kurvelesh who was killed in July 1943, was created as the centre of an agricultural cooperative in 1947 on the road leading from Lunxhëri to Dropull. The people who were settled in the new village were mainly shepherds from Kurvelesh, and were Muslims. The same thing happened for the village of Arshi Llongo, while other Muslims from Kurvelesh settled in the villages of lower Lunxhëri (Karjan, Shën Todër, Valare) and in Suhë. As a result, it is not exceptional to hear today from the Lunxhots, such as one of my informants, a retired engineer living in Tirana, that 'in 1945 a Muslim buffer-zone was created between Dropull and Lunxhëri to stop the Hellenisation of Lunxhëri. Muslims were thought to be more determined against Greeks. At that time, the danger of Hellenisation was real in Lunxhëri'. In the village of Këllëz people also regret that 'Lunxhëri has been surrounded by a Muslim buffer-zone by Enver Hoxha, who was himself a Muslim'." "By the end of the nineteenth century, however, during the period of the kurbet, the Lunxhots were moving between two extreme positions regarding ethnic and national affiliation. On the one hand, there were those who joined the Albanian national movement, especially in Istanbul, and made attempts to spread a feeling of Albanian belonging in Lunxhëri. The well-known Koto Hoxhi (1825-1895) and Pandeli Sotiri (1843-1891), who participated in the opening of the first Albanian school in Korçë in 1887, were both from Lunxhëri (from the villages of Qestorat and Selckë). On the other hand were those who insisted on the Greekness of the Lunxhots and were opposed to the development of an Albanian national identity among the Christians.")

1926: 78, 1927: 68, 1928: 66, 1929: 60, 1930: 63, 1931: 64, 1932: 43, 1933: 10, 1934: 0

During this period, the Albanian state led efforts to establish an independent orthodox church (contrary to the Protocol of Corfu), thereby reducing the influence of Greek language in the country's south. According to a 1923 law, priests who were not Albanian speakers, as well as not of Albanian origin, were excluded from this new autocephalous church.

=== World War II (1939–1945) ===
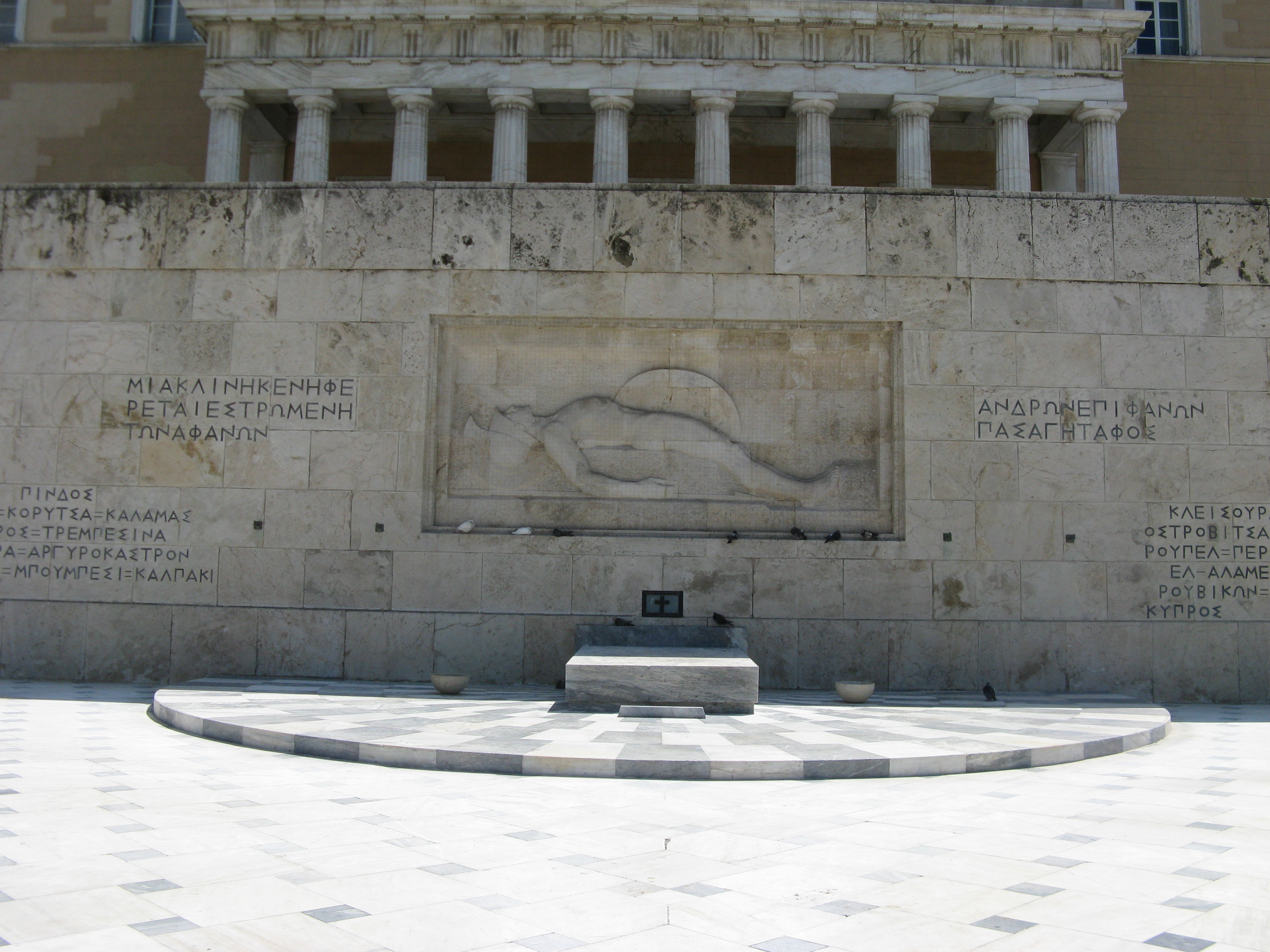
Tomb of the unknown soldier, Greek Parliament. Several place names of Northern Epirus, where the Greek army participated, are inscribed on both sides.

In 1939, Albania became an Italian protectorate and was used to facilitate military operations against Greece the following year. The Italian attack, launched at October 28, 1940 was quickly repelled by the Greek forces. The Greek army, although facing a numerically and technologically superior army, counterattacked and in the next month managed to enter Northern Epirus. Northern Epirus thus became the site of the first clear setback for the Axis powers. However, after a six-month period of Greek administration, the invasion of Greece by Nazi Germany followed in April 1941 and Greece capitulated.

Following Greece's surrender, Northern Epirus again became part of the Italian-occupied Albanian protectorate. Many Northern Epirotes formed resistance groups and organizations in the struggle against the occupation forces. In 1942 the Northern Epirote Liberation Organization (EAOVI, also called MAVI) was formed. Some others, c. 1,500 joined the left-wing Albanian National Liberation Army, in which they formed three separate battalion (named Thanasis Zikos, Pantelis Botsaris, Lefteris Talios). During the latter stages of the war, the Albanian communists were able to stop contact between the minority and the right-wing soldiers of EDES in southern Epirus, that wanted to unite Northern Epirus with Greece .

When the war ended and the communists gained power in Albania, a United States Senate resolution demanded the cession of the region to the Greek state, but according to the following post war international peace treaties it remained part of the Albanian state. During this time, some Greeks and Orthodox Albanians managed to flee Albania and resettle in Greece. (Note: "During the mid-war period and the period between WWII and the foundation of the communist regime in Albania, there is a wave of relocations of Greek and Albanian Christians from South Albania to Greek Epirus, who have become known as "Vorioepirotes", meaning Greeks who come from the part of Epirus that was yielded to Albania and is since called by Greeks "Northern Epirus". The "Vorioepirotes" of Albanian origin have to a large extent formed Greek consciousness and identity and this is why they choose to come to Greece, where they are dealt with just like the rest. On the contrary, only Muslims who have developed Albanian national consciousness or who cannot identify with either Greeks or Turks leave Greece for Albania, which they choose due to ethnic, language and religious affinity. Let's note that the flight of the Vorioepirotes" of both Greek and Albanian origin persists in the form of escape during the communist regime, despite the Draconian security measures on the border, though to a much lesser degree.") Despite an imminent civil war, a strong nationalist climate emerged in Greece which demanded the reannexation of Northern Epirus. This was supported largely by both the EAM and "nationalist" camps. On the other hand, Evangelos Averoff, a member of the Informal Inter-Allied Committee in Rome, took an opposing stance. He argued in a confidential report to the Greek Foreign Ministry that claims over Albania should be dropped, saying that the Greek speakers there comprised a small proportion, and a significant part of it wanted to assimilate into the new Albanian regime.

=== Cold War period (1946–1991) – Hoxha's regime ===
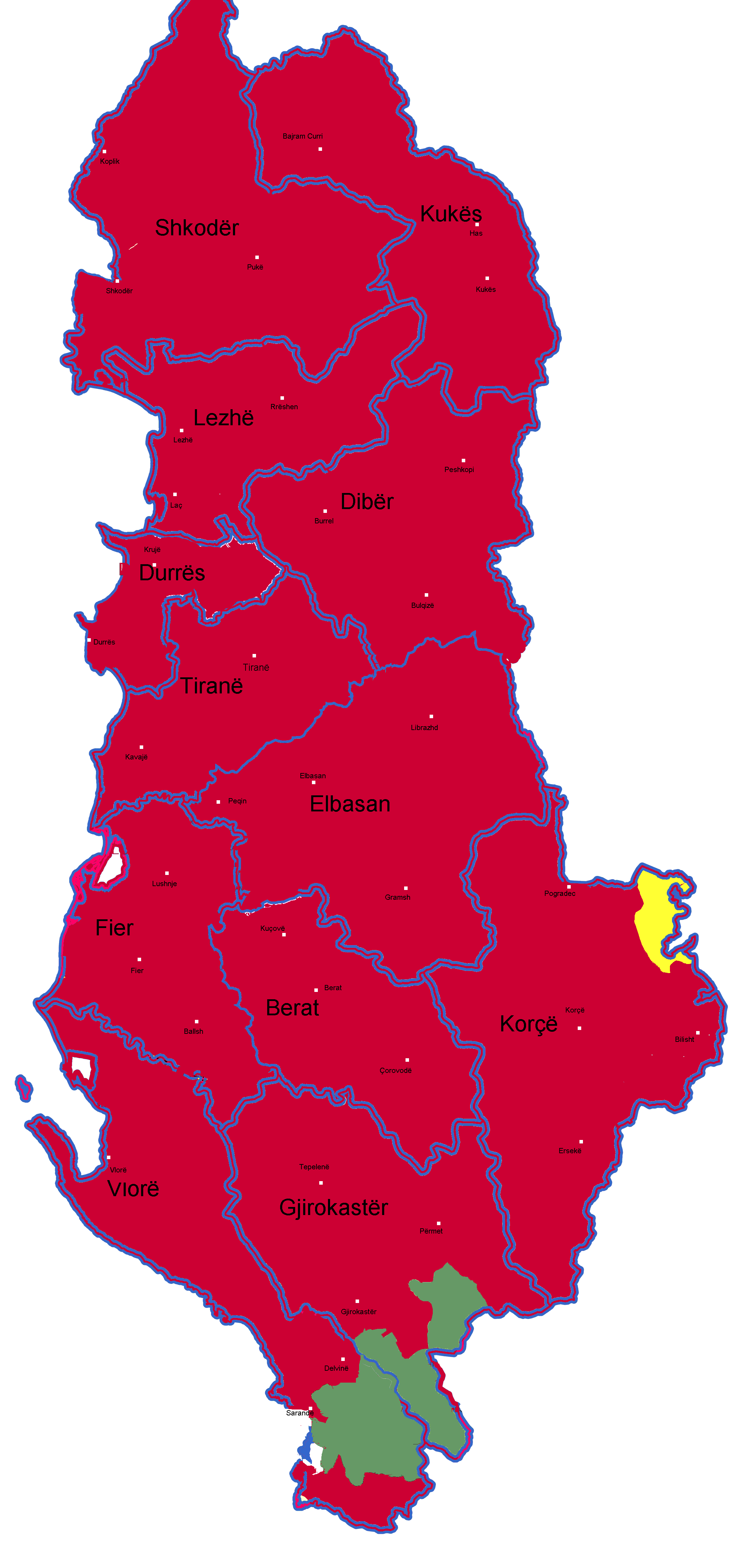
Approximate extent of the recognized (after 1945) Greek 'minority zone' in green, according to the 1989 Albanian census. Greek majority areas in green.

At the end of World War II, normal relations between Greece and Albania were not restored, and the two countries remained technically in a state of war until 1987. This was largely due to Greece's territorial claims on Northern Epirus and the treatment of the Greek minority. Relations remained tense for most of the Cold War as a result.

Enver Hoxha was willing to build a constituency with the Greek minority since 1944, while some minority members had participated in the partisan struggle against the Axis. A policy of tokenism was adopted with a few favoured members of the Greek minority taking prominent positions in the one-party system.

After WWII, Albania restored the minority zone based on the 1921 League of Nations agreement but without the inclusion of the three Himara villages and education in Greek within the minority zone along with other competencies based on Comintern policies on cultural-linguistic minority issues. These competencies were related to territorial rights - as in the Soviet Union - and didn't apply as individual rights outside the minority zones. Further issues about their application involved local politics which concerned the participation of specific communities in Communist units during WWII. After the regime's end in 1990–91, the application of this system for the Greek minority has been described by sharply diverging narratives. Greeks in Albania, unlike minorities in other countries of the Balkans like Slav-Macedonians in Greece during this era, were a formally recognized minority that had the right to education in Greek as well as the right to publish and broadcast in Greek. Nevertheless, the use of Greek outside the minority zones, for example in Himara, was forbidden, and many Greek names of people and places were changed to Albanian.

The Soviet-Yugoslav rapprochement in the early 1960s and the possibility that Greece might annex Northern Epirus were important factors in Albania's rift with the Soviet Union and its move towards China. In 1967, all religious places of worship in the country were closed, all forms of public worship were outlawed throughout the country, and all the religious identities of the population were officially denied, including Orthodox Christianity in southern Albania. These measures were particularly harsh for the Greek minority, since their religion was tied to their culture. As part of the atheism campaign the Greek minority was subject to much more comprehensive persecusion, with the closure and demolition of churches, burning of religious books and widespread human rights violations. Approximately 630 Orthodox churches in southern Albania were either closed or re-purposed. In 1975, "foreign" or religious personal and place names were prohibited, and had to change.

The regime also relocated Albanian settlers to the Greek minority regions and at the same time forced many Greeks to relocate to northern and central Albania, in what was seen by ethnic Greeks as an attempt to alter the demographic composition of Northern Epirus. In the "minority zones", the regime created new villages with Albanian settlers, or else settled Albanian families in villages that had previously been entirely Greek. In the mixed villages, the minority rights of the Greek inhabitants were curtailed. The settlers were frequently military or administrative personnel and their families, and acted as enforcers of regime policies. Examples of these policies was the settling of 300 Albanian families in the Greek-inhabited town of Himara, and the creation of an entirely new settlement of Gjashta, comprised 3,000 Cham Albanians in the vicinity of Saranda. The settlers were awarded land grants, resulting in the permanent alteration of the demographic composition of these areas.

The Communist system did not discriminate the Greek minority based on ethnicity, and overall the minority faced the same issues as the rest of Albania's population under a dictatorship. A considerable number of Greeks integrated into Albanian society, acquired higher education and positions in the political, intellectual and military elite of the country like Kiço Mustaqi and Simon Stefani.

The first serious attempt to improve relations was initiated by Greece in the 1980s, during the government of Andreas Papandreou. In 1984, during a speech in Epirus, Papandreou declared that the inviolability of European borders as stipulated in the Helsinki Final Act of 1975, to which Greece was a signatory, applied to the Greek-Albanian border. The most significant change occurred on 28 August 1987, when the Greek Cabinet lifted the state of war that had been declared since November 1940. At the same time, Papandreou deplored the "miserable condition under which the Greeks in Albania live". This generated a strong outcry from the right, nationalists, the Greek Church, diaspora Greeks in North America, and especially Northern Epirus organisations. The decision was considered by them to be a death knell to the Northern Epirus issue. However, Papandreou stood by his decision, arguing that it would benefit the Greek minority. Eventually journalists and artists were encouraged to visit Albania. As Albania became more dependent on trade relations with Greece the situation of the ethnic Greek population gradually improved, but nevertheless discriminatory practices existed at the time of the collapse of the People's Republic of Albania (1990). During the years of the communist regime, irredentist aspirations by the pro-Greek parties of southern Albania was nonexistent, but re-emerged after the regime's collapse in 1991.

=== Post-communist period (1991–present) ===
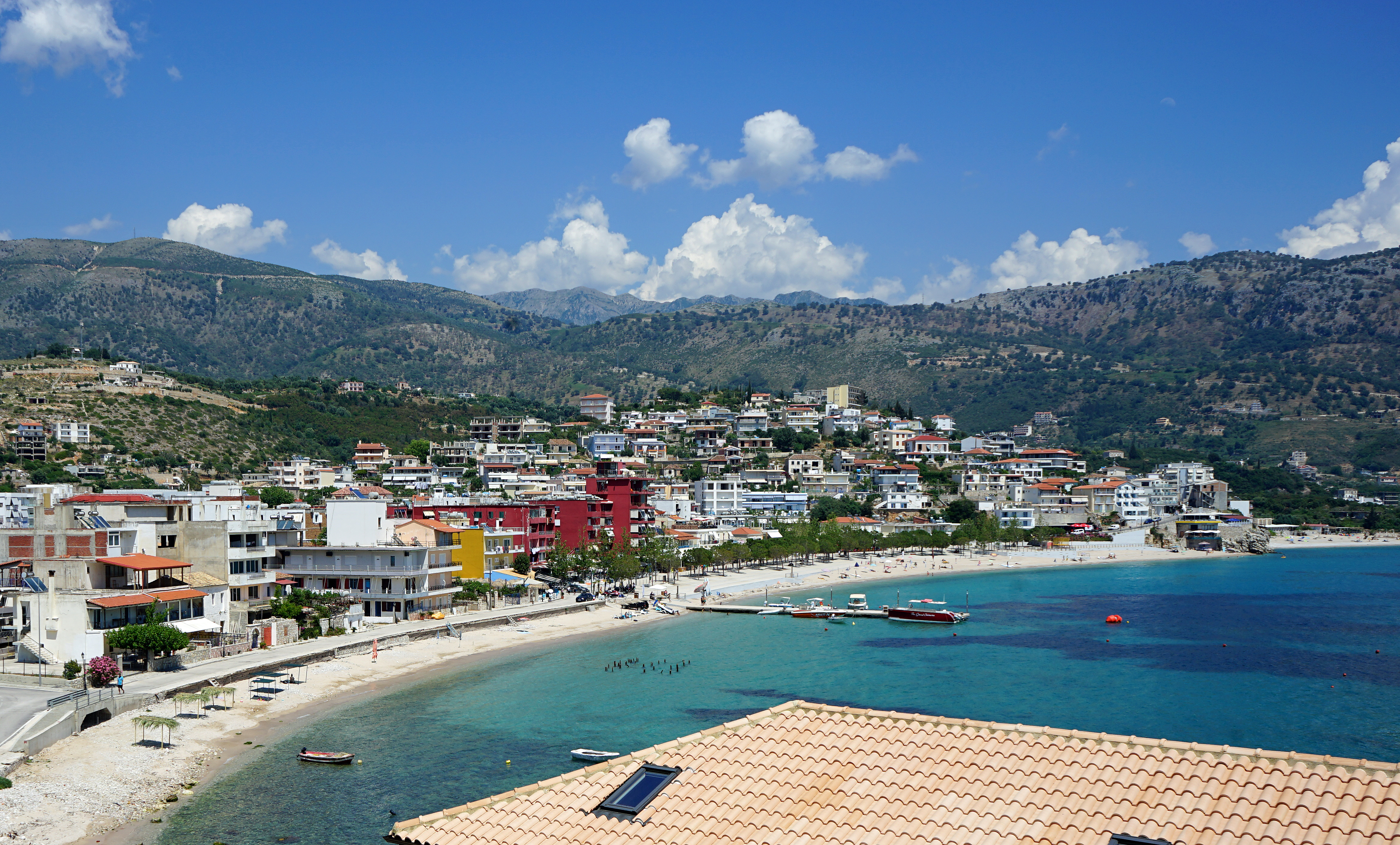
The predominantly Greek-inhabited town of Himare has frequently been a location of contention in Greek-Albanian relations.

Beginning in 1990, large number of Albanian citizens, including members of the Greek minority, began seeking refuge in Greece. This exodus turned into a flood by 1991, creating a new reality in Greek-Albanian relations. The resurrection of the Northern Epirus issue by Greece surprised the international community, as it was little known or, if known to some diplomats and historians, it was considered as a dead issue. With the fall of communism in 1991, Orthodox churches were reopened and religious practices were permitted after 35 years of strict prohibition. Moreover, Greek-language education was initially expanded. In 1991 ethnic Greeks shops in the town of Saranda were attacked, and inter-ethnic relations throughout Albania worsened. (Note: "In 1991, Greek shops were attacked in the coastal town of Saranda, home to a large minority population, and inter-ethnic relations throughout Albania worsened".) From early 1992 onwards, the Greek Government was evaluating two different approaches to Albania. The first option aimed at limiting its demands for Albania to respect the minority's human rights. The second one, which was eventually chosen by the Greek Government, aimed at using legitimate concerns about the minority's human rights as a facade for raising the Northern Epirus issue. The decision damaged the Greek-Albanian relations in the coming years. It seems that the strategy envisioned two phases. It planned demands for an autonomous Northern Epirus, and after this was achieved, to press for annexation to Greece. PM Mitsotakis and his close associates were under the impression that Albania was on the verge of disintegration, a view that they also held for North Macedonia. A possible reason for this strategy was the need of Mitsotakis to balance out what was perceived as his soft stance on other foreign policy issues, such as those related to Turkey, Macedonia naming dispute and Cyprus. Furthermore, the situation in Kosovo had raised the possibility of border changes in the Balkans, which was seen by Greek nationalists and Mitsotakis as a likely opportunity to change the Greek-Albanian border. The propagandistic activity of a Greek priest, Archimandrite Chrysostomos, who started to distribute maps which showed southern Albania as a part of Greece under the name "Northern Epirus", fueled tensions to a further point. This led PM Sali Berisha to harden his stance against the 'Northern Epirus' expansionist policy, and expel the priest, a move which was protested by a part of the Greek minority. The Greek Government as a response deported thousands of Albanian immigrants, and in July made a list of six demands to Albania. Among them was the demand that Albania grants to the Greeks autonomy, in line with Albania's stance on Kosovo. It ignored the difference between the suffering of two million Albanians in Kosovo and the small, non-suffering Greek minority. Berisha rejected the demands, and Mitsotakis soon realized his mistake and withdrew them. However, hard-line members of Omonia continued to demand for the Greek minority whatever would be granted to the Albanians in Kosovo. Greek-Albanian tensions escalated in November 1993, when seven Greek schools were forcibly closed by the Albanian police. A purge of ethnic Greeks in the professions in Albania continued in 1994, with particular emphasis in law and the military.

On the night of 10 April 1994, eight armed men of the Northern Epirus Liberation Front (MAVI) crossed the border and attacked a military post near Peshkëpi. As a result, an Albanian officer and a soldier were killed, and three other soldiers were wounded. MAVI took responsibility for the act, declaring that it was "a military action" justified by "injustice" and the "terrorizing of the Greeks of Northern Epirus by the Albanian Government". The attack is known as the Peshkëpi incident, and has been described as a terrorist attack by some scholars. Although the new Government of Andreas Papandreou did not have any connection to it, the incident increased the tensions between the two countries.

In response to the incident, the Albanian Government on 20 May 1994 to take into custody five members of the ethnic Greek advocacy organization Omonoia on the charge of high treason, accusing them of secessionist activities and illegal possession of weapons (a sixth member was added later). (Note: "This war of words culminated in the arrest by the Albanian authorities in May of six members of the Onomoia, the main Greek minority organization in Albania. At their subsequent trial, five of the six received prison sentences of between six and eight years for treasonable advocacy of the secession of "Northern Epirus" to Greece and the illegal possession of weapons.") The material gathered by Persecutor General Arben Qeleshi was conclusive. It showed, using documents that the Omonoia leaders had not destroyed in time, collusion with the previous Mitsotakis Government. Sentences of six to eight years were handed down. The accusations, the maltreatment of the accused, and the manner in which the trial was conducted and its outcome were strongly criticized by Greece as well as international organizations. Greece responded by freezing all EU aid to Albania, sealing its border with Albania, and between August–November 1994, expelling over 115,000 illegal Albanian immigrants, a figure quoted in the US Department of State Human Rights Report and given to the American authorities by their Greek counterpart. Papandreou also accused the Greek "super-patriots" for damaging the Greek-Albanian relations. Tensions increased even further when the Albanian government drafted a law requiring the head of the Orthodox Church in Albania to have been born in Albania, which would force the then head of the church, the Greek Archbishop Anastasios of Albania from his post. In December 1994, however, Greece began to permit limited EU aid to Albania as a gesture of goodwill, while Albania released two of the Omonoia defendants and reduced the sentences of the remaining four. In 1995, the remaining defendants were released on suspended sentences.

==== Recent years ====
In recent years relations have significantly improved; Greece and Albania signed a Treaty of Friendship, Cooperation, Good Neighborliness and Security in 1996. It brought an official ending to the Northern Epirus issue for Greece. However, Albanians at times apparently see the issue as dormant and potentially resurgent; potentially as a bargaining chip in Albania's accession talks with the EU. This view is strengthened by the existence of several unresolved issues in Greek-Albanian relations. The treaty pledged to the development of relations based on mutual confidence and respect. It stated that both countries agreed on the inviolability of borders as stipulated in the Helsinki Final Act. They pledged to respect territorial integrity, human and minority rights. As per agreement, several schools for the Greek minority were opened. The Greek Government pledged its support for Albania's membership in NATO and EU. After the signing of the treaty, leaders of the minority returned to the moderate stance of the early 1990s, abandoning the influence of the irredentists.

In the 2000s, although relations between Albania and Greece improved, the Greek minority in Albania continued to complain about discrimination; particularly regarding education in the Greek language, property rights, government documents, and the government's unwillingness to recognize the presence of Greeks outside of the official minority area. Tensions and nationalistic rhetoric between the Albanian majority and Greek minority resurfaced during local government elections in Himara in 2000, when a number of incidents of hostility concerning the Greek minority took place, as well as with the defacing of signposts written in Greek in the country's south by Albanian nationalist elements. There were tensions as international talks on Kosovo's independence got underway in 2007, and there were also incidents following the 2008 Kosovo declaration of independence. In April 2005, a bilingual Greek-Albanian school in Korçë was opened; and after many years of efforts, in early 2006, a private Greek school was opened in the Himara municipality. After 1991, rights which were exclusive to the minority zone were gradually made non-geographical and applicable throughout Albania. As such, the Law on Protection of National Minorities (2017) explicitly stipulates that linguistic and cultural rights of minorities can be exercised "in the entire territory of Albania". The right to education (funded by state institutions) and the right to use a non-Albanian language in local administration, are partially defined territorially and require that at least 20% of the population of an area has to belong to a minority community and request the exercise of such rights.

Greek-Albanian relations have improved in recent years, though a rapprochement as foreseen in the 1996 treaty has not been reached yet. The unresolved issues between the two countries, nationalism in both of them, and the effects of their entangled histories are seen as the culprit. For Greece, issues to be addressed include the perceived lack of respect for minority rights, education, unjustified demolition of properties of minority members, and what is left of the Northern Epirus issue. For Albania, among the issues to be addressed is the "state of war" in Greece, which is seen by Albania as a concealed form of irredentism and a way to keep in place the sequestration of Albanian properties in Greece. Although Greece has abandoned the Northern Epirus ideological platform, peripheral segments in Greece and, particularly, in the Greek Diaspora continue to push the Northern Epirus thesis and maintain an online populist discourse.

== Demographics ==
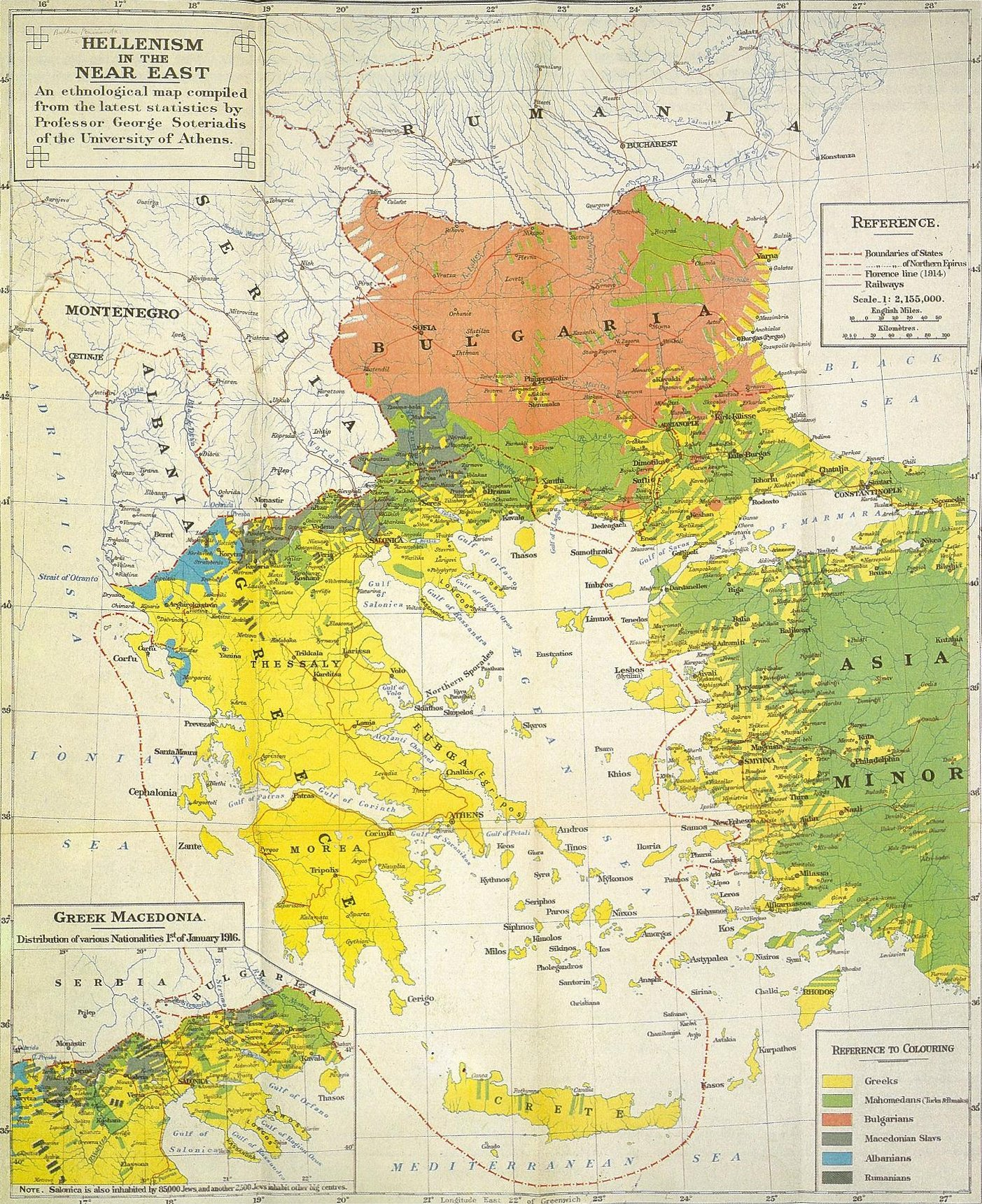
20th century ethnographic map by Greek scholar Georgios Sotiriadis submitted to the Paris Peace Conference (1919).

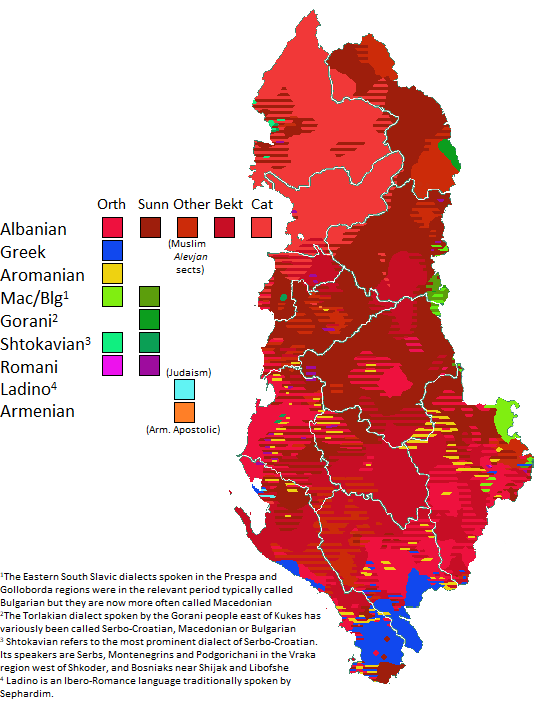
Traditional locations of linguistic and religious communities in Albania.

In Albania, Greeks are considered a "national minority". (Note: "... the area studied was confined to the southern border fringes, and there is good reason to believe that this estimate was very low ... Under this definition, minority status was limited to those who lived in 99 villages in the southern border areas, thereby excluding important concentrations of Greek settlement in Vlorë (perhaps 8000 people in 1994) and in adjoining areas along the coast, ancestral Greek towns such as Himara, and ethnic Greeks living elsewhere throughout the country. Mixed villages outside this designated zone, even those with a clear majority of ethnic Greeks, were not considered minority areas and therefore were denied any Greek-language cultural or educational provisions. In addition, many Greeks were forcibly removed from the minority zones to other parts of the country as a product of communist population policy, an important and constant element of which was to pre-empt ethnic sources of political dissent. Greek place-names were changed to Albanian names, while use of the Greek language, prohibited everywhere outside the minority zones, was prohibited for many official purposes within them as well.") In the 2023 census in Albania, 23,485 people (0.98%) declared themselves Greek. In the Vlorë County 12,044 people (8.21%) were self-declared Greek, in the Gjirokastër County 8,552 (14.25%), and in the Korçë County 740 (0.42%). As of 2012, 189,000 immigrants from Albania live in Greece with the status of 'co-ethnics', a title reserved for Albania's Greek community members. The Greek state counts as Greeks or of Greek ancestry many Aromanians and Orthodox Albanians.

The Greek minority in Albania is located compactly within the wider Gjirokastër and Sarandë regions, (Note: "According to the latest census in the area, the Greek-speaking population is larger but not necessarily continuous and concentrated. The exclusively Greek-speaking villages, apart from Himarë, are Queparo Siperme, Dhërmi and Palasë. The rest are inhabited by Albanian-speaking Orthodox Christians (Kallivretakis 1995:25-58)."; "The Greek minority of Albania is found in the southern part of the country and it mostly constitutes a compact group of people. Apart from the cities (Gjirokastër, Sarandë), whose population is mixed, the villages of these two areas, which are officially recognized as minority areas, are in the vast majority of their population Greek and their historical presence in this geographical space, has led to an identification of the group with this place.") (Note: "But in spite of the efforts of Greek schools and churches near Vlorë, Berat and Korçë, Greek speech only really exists today in the extreme south-west of Albania near Butrint and along the border as far as Kakavia, in three villages along the coast near Himarë, and in the Drinos valley near Gjirokastër. Even in these areas there are pockets of Albania speech, and almost all Greek-speakers are bilingual. Emigration to Greece has in the past ten years both emptied certain villages and increased the number of Greek-speakers. Pro-Greek feelings may have existed at other opportune times among people who spoke Albanian at home, but were Orthodox in religion and spoke Greek in commercial dealing or at church.") (Note: "Another factor contributing to the lower rate of increase in the Greek minority is the internal movement of the ethnic Greeks. The women who marry non-Greeks outside the minority areas often give up their Greek nationality. The same thing can be said about the ethnic Greeks, especially those with university training, who would be employed outside their villages. In particular, those working in large cities like Tirana very often would not declare their Greek nationality. ... As can be seen from Table I, the preponderant number of Greek nationals, 57,602, live in southern Albania, south of the Shkumbin River. Only 1,156 ethnic Greeks reside outside of this region, principally in the cities of Tirana, Durres and Elbasan. Thus, in southern Albania, with an area of 13,000 square kilometers and a population of 1,377,810, the Greek minority makes up 4.18 percent of the overall population. But the highest concentration of the Greek minority is located in an area of 1,000 square kilometers in the enclaves of Pogon, Dropull and Vurg, specifically, the townships of Lower Dropull, Upper Dropull and Pogon, in the district of Gjirokastra; the townships of Vergo, Finiq, Aliko, Mesopotam and the city of Delvina in the district of Delvina; and the townships of Livadhja, Dhiver and the city of Saranda, in the district of Saranda. This concentration has a total population of 53,986 ethnic Greeks. In turn, these enclaves are within the districts of Gjirokastra, Delvina and Saranda, with an area of 2,234 square kilometers which contains a total of 56,452 ethnic Greeks, or 36.6 percent of the general population of 154,141 in the region.") and also in four settlements within the coastal Himarë area where they form an overall majority population. (Note: "The coastal Himara region of Southern Albania has always had a predominantly ethnic Greek population.") Other Greek-speaking settlements are found within Përmet municipality, near the border, and two coastal villages near Vlorë outside the area defined as Northern Epirus. Some Greek speakers are also located within the wider Korçë region. Due to both forced and voluntary internal migration of Greeks within Albania during the communist era, (Note: "In contrast, Albanian governments use a much lower figure of 58,000 which rests on the unrevised definition of "minority" adopted during the communist period. Under this definition, minority status was limited to those who lived in 99 villages in the southern border areas, thereby excluding important concentrations of Greek settlement in Vlora (perhaps 8000 people in 1994) and in adjoining areas along the coast, ancestral Greek towns such as Himara, and ethnic Greeks living elsewhere throughout the country. Mixed villages outside this designated zone, even those with a clear majority of ethnic Greeks, were not considered minority areas and therefore were denied any Greek-language cultural or educational provisions. In addition, many Greeks were forcibly removed from the minority zones to other parts of the country as a product of communist population policy, an important and constant element of which was to pre-empt ethnic sources of political dissent. Greek place-names were changed to Albanian names, while use of the Greek language, prohibited everywhere outside the minority zones, was prohibited for many official purposes within them as well.") some Greek speakers are also located within the wider Përmet and Tepelenë regions. While due to forced and non-forced internal population movements of Greeks within Albania during the communist era, some Greek speakers are also dispersed within the wider Berat, (Note: "Berat was the seat of a Greek bishopric ... and today Vlach- and even Greek-speakers can be found in the town and the villages near by".) Durrës, Kavajë, Peqin, Elbasan and Tiranë regions. In the period 1945–1989, during the Hoxha regime, 99 settlements were officially recognized as being predominantly or exclusively inhabited by ethnic Greeks. Scholar Leonidas Kallivretakis, who conducted demographic research (1994) in the region a few years after the regime's end, identified 92 settlements exclusively or near exclusively inhabited by ethnic Greeks, with another 16 mixed settlements with a Greek minority or plurality. In the post-1990 period, like many other minorities elsewhere in Balkans, the Greek population has diminished because of heavy migration. After the Greek economic crisis (2009), members of the Greek minority returned to Albania.

== See also ==
- Greek nationalism
- Chameria
- Enosis
- Postage stamps and postal history of Northern Epirus
- List of historic Greek countries and regions

== Bibliography ==
=== History ===
- Allcock, John B. (1992). "Albania-Greece (Northern Epirus)". Border and Territorial Disputes. Longman. pp. 3–8. ISBN 978-0-582-20931-2.
- Boardman, John; Hammond, N.G.L. (1970). The Cambridge Ancient History - The Expansion of the Greek World, Eighth to Sixth Centuries B.C. Part 3: Volume 3. Cambridge University Press. ISBN 0-521-23447-6.
- Bowden, William (2003). Epirus Vetus: The Archaeology of a Late Antique Province. Duckworth. ISBN 978-0-7156-3116-4.
- Boardman, John; Sollberger, E. (1982). J. Boardman; I. E. S. Edwards; N. G. L. Hammond; E. Sollberger (eds.). The Cambridge Ancient History: The Prehistory of the Balkans; and the Middle East and the Aegean world, tenth to eighth centuries B.C. Vol. III (part 1) (2 ed.). Cambridge University Press. ISBN 0521224969.
- Dalakoglou, Dimitris (2010). "The road: An ethnography of the Albanian-Greek cross-border motorway". American Ethnologist. 37 (1): 132–149. doi:10.1111/j.1548-1425.2010.01246.x. hdl:1871.1/46adcb87-0107-4e00-87e1-9130ee16b0fa. ISSN 0094-0496. JSTOR 40389883.
- Green, Sarah (2012). "Reciting the future: Border relocations and everyday speculations in two Greek border regions". HAU: Journal of Ethnographic Theory. 2 (1): 111–129. doi:10.14318/hau2.1.007. ISSN 2575-1433. S2CID 220744145.
- Stickney, Edith Pierpont (1926). Southern Albania or Northern Epirus in European International Affairs, 1912–1923. Stanford University Press.
- Ruches, Pyrrhus J. (1965). Albania's captives. Chicago: Argonaut.
- Clogg, Richard (2002). Concise History of Greece (Second ed.). Cambridge: Cambridge University Press. ISBN 0-521-80872-3.
- Roudometof, Victor; Robertson, Roland (2001). Nationalism, globalization, and orthodoxy: the social origins of ethnic conflict in the Balkans. Greenwood Publishing Group. ISBN 978-0-313-31949-5.
- Winnifrith, Tom (2002). Badlands-borderlands: a history of Northern Epirus/Southern Albania. London: Duckworth. ISBN 0-7156-3201-9.
- Manta, Elevtheria (2005). Aspects of the Italian influence upon Greek - Albanian relations during the interwar period (Doctoral Dissertation) (in Greek). Aristotle University Of Thessaloniki. doi:10.12681/eadd/23718. hdl:10442/hedi/23718.
- Wilkes, John (1996). The Illyrians. Wiley-Blackwell. ISBN 0631198075.
- Konidaris, Gerasimos (2005). "Examining policy responses to immigration in the light of interstate relations and foreign policy objectives: Greece and Albania". In King, Russell; Mai, Nicola; Schwandner-Sievers, Stephanie (eds.). The New Albanian Migration. Sussex Academic Press. pp. 64–92. ISBN 978-1-903900-78-9.

=== Current topics ===
- Vickers, Miranda; Pettifer, James (1997). Albania: from anarchy to a Balkan identity. London: C. Hurst & Co. Publishers. ISBN 0-7156-3201-9.
- Nußberger, Angelika; Stoppel, Wolfgang (2001). "Minderheitenschutz im östlichen Europa (Albanien)" (PDF) (in German). Cologne: Universität Köln. Archived from the original (PDF) on 2016-03-03.
- Lastaria-Cornhiel, Sussana; Wheeler, Rachel (1998). "Working Paper. Albanian Series. Gender Ethnicity and Landed Property in Albania" (PDF). Land Tenure Center. University of Wisconsin.
- Pettifer, James (2001). The Greek Minority in Albania – In the Aftermath of Communism (PDF). Surrey, UK: Conflict Studies Research Centre. ISBN 1-903584-35-3. Archived from the original (PDF) on 2011-07-06.
- Russell King, Nicola Mai, Stephanie Schwandner-Sievers (Ed.) (2005). The New Albanian Migration. Sussex Academic Press. ISBN 978-1-903900-78-9.
  - De Rapper, Gilles (2005). "Better than Muslims, not as good as Greeks. Emigration as experienced and imagined by the Albanian Christians of Lunxhëri". In Russell King; Nicola Mai; Stephanie Schwandner-Sievers (eds.). The New Albanian Migration. pp. 173–194.
- Gregorič, Nataša (2008). "Contested Spaces and Negotiated Identities in Dhermi/Drimades of Himare/Himara area, Southern Albania" (PDF). University of Nova Gorica. Archived from the original (PDF) on 2011-06-10.
- Nitsiakos, Vassilis (2010). On the Border: Transborder Mobility, Ethnic Groups and Boundaries Along the Albanian-Greek Frontier. LIT Verlag. ISBN 9783643107930.
- Djordjević, Ljubica; Zaimi, Zenajda (2019). "Commentary: The Law on Protection of National Minorities in the Republic of Albania" (PDF). Journal on Ethnopolitics and Minority Issues in Europe. 18 (1).
- Vickers, Miranda (2002). "The Greek Minority in Albania – Current Tensions" (PDF). Defence Academy of the United Kingdom. 10.
