= Takis Tsiakos =

Greek poet

- Born: 1909; Gjirokastër
- Died: 1997 (aged 87–88); Athens

Takis Tsiakos (Greek: Τάκης Τσιάκος, 1909–1997) was a Greek poet, representative of the poetic style of Kostis Palamas.

Tsiakos was born in Gjirokastër, Janina Vilayet, Ottoman Empire, present-day southern Albania. In 1930 he moved to Ioannina, Greece, where he made his literary appearance writing lyrics in columns of local newspapers as well as in widely known Greek magazines. In 1936 he published his first collection named 'Extinguished echo' (Greek: Σβησμένη Ηχώ). His work was influenced by the national character of Kostis Palamas' poetry, something that was commonly found among the Greek poets from the Greek minority in Albania. Takis Tsiakos later became the vice president of the Board of the Association of Greek Litterateurs.

== Poetry collections ==
Takis Tsiakos published the following poetry collections:

1936: Extinct Echoes (Σβησμένη Ηχώ)
1945: Beaches and reefs (Αμμουδιές και Βατραχάκια)
1949: Limpets (Πεταλίδες)
1956: Noon.
1976: Strolls and Returns.

His works have been translated in several languages.
