= Thanas Ziko Battalion =

The Thanas Ziko Battalion (Albanian: Batalioni "Thanas Ziko"), was a partisan battalion of the Albanian National Liberation Army, founded during the Second World War. It was composed mainly of ethnic Greeks in Albania, inhabitants of the Greek villages of the Gjirokastër area. The Battalion was established in November 1943. In the summer of 1944 it became part of the XIX Shock Brigade of the Albanian National Liberation Army.

Thanas Ziko (Greek: Θανάσης Ζήκος) was a member of the Greek minority in Albania from a village near Gjirokastër. The Battalion was named in his memory.

== Background and formation ==
Following the Italian invasion of Albania, the Albanian Kingdom became a protectorate of the Kingdom of Italy. The Italians used the Albanian minority in Greece as a pretext for declaring war on Greece. Although fascist Italy was defeated in the Greco-Italian War, a rapid German blitzkrieg campaign followed in April 1941, and by the middle of May, Greece was under joint occupation by three Axis powers: Germany, Italy and Bulgaria. Following the creation of the Albanian National Liberation Front, the Albanian resistance activities in the area of Gjirokastër increased. The Greek minority in Albania supported the anti-Axis resistance, and a separate battalion of ethnic Greek partisans (the Thanas Ziko Battalion) was established in November 1943.
