= Ledio Pano =

Albanian footballer

Personal information
- Full name: Ledio Pano
- Date of birth: 23 May 1968 (age 58)
- Place of birth: Albania
- Position: Midfielder

Senior career*
Years	Team	Apps	(Gls)
1986–1991	Partizani	112	(42)
1991–1992	Luftëtari	24	(9)
1992–1997	Skoda Xanthi	116	(29)
1997–1998	Panargiakos		
1998–1999	Panelefsiniakos	24	(7)
1999–2000	PAS Giannina	19	(5)
2001–2002	Partizani	32	(11)

International career
1987–1996	Albania	9	(1)
- * Club domestic league appearances and goals

Ledio Pano (Greek: Λεωνίδας Πάνου; born 23 May 1968) is an Albanian retired professional football player. Pano holds the world record of the best penalty kick scoring ratio being successful 50 out of 50 attempts. He is the son of Panajot Pano who is widely regarded as one of the best footballers in the history of Albanian football.

== Club career ==
He began his professional career with Partizani Tirana, and later moved to Luftëtari Gjirokastër. He played much of his career in Greece with Skoda Xanthi, Panelefsiniakos, and PAS Giannina.

== International career ==
He made his debut for Albania in an April 1987 European Championship qualification match at home against Austria and earned a total of 9 caps, scoring 1 goal. His final international was an August 1996 friendly match against Greece.

=== International statistics ===
Appearances and goals by national team and year
National team	Year	Apps	Goals
Albania	1987	1	0
Albania	1988	0	0
Albania	1989	1	0
Albania	1990	1	0
Albania	1991	0	0
Albania	1992	0	0
Albania	1993	0	0
Albania	1994	2	0
Albania	1995	3	0
Albania	1996	1	1
Total		9	1

=== International goals ===
Albania score listed first, score column indicates score after each Pano goal.

International goals by date, venue, cap, opponent, score, result and competition
No.	Date	Venue	Cap	Opponent	Score	Result	Competition
1	14 August 1996	Olympic Stadium, Marousi, Greece	9	Greece	1–2	1–2	Friendly

== Personal life ==
Ledio is of Greek descent. He is the son of former Partizani striker Panajot Pano, who was Albania's Golden Player for the UEFA Jubilee Awards.

== Honours ==
- Albanian Superliga: 1

1987

- Albanian Cup: 2

1988, 1992

== See also ==
- List of world association football records
