= Stavrianos Vistiaris =

Greek poet

Stavrianos Vistiaris (Greek: Σταυριανός Βιστιάρης, 16th-17th century), was a Greek poet born in the village of Maliçan, in modern Sarande District, a region of Albania.

He became renowned because of his extensive epic poem: Braveries of the noble and valiant voevode Michael (Greek: Ανδραγαθίες του ευσεβεστάτου και ανδρειωτάτου Μιχαήλ Βοεβόδα). The poem was written around 1602 in a medieval Greek dialect; at the time Vistiaris was working at the court of the ruler of Wallachia, Michael the Brave.

The work describes the personality and life of the Wallachian ruler.
