= Zachos Milios =

Greek revolutionary of the Greek War of Independence

Colonel Zachos Milios
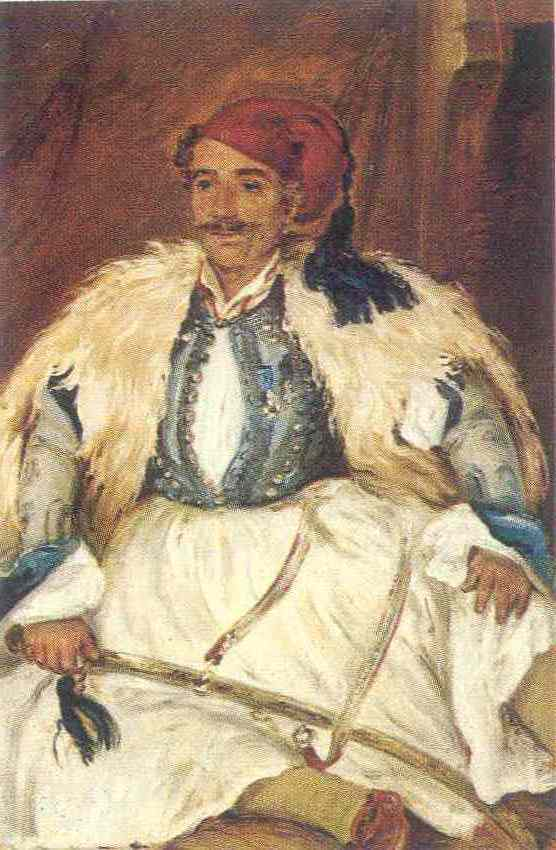
- Zachos Milios wearing a foustanella.
- Born: c. 1805; Himara, Pashalik of Yanina, Ottoman Empire (modern Albania)
- Died: c. 1860; Athens, Kingdom of Greece
- Relatives: Spyromilios (brother)
- Military career
- Allegiance: First Hellenic Republic; Kingdom of Greece
- Branch: Greek Revolutionary Army; Hellenic Army
- Service years: 1824–1860
- Rank: Colonel
- Conflicts: Greek War of Independence
- Awards: Order of the Redeemer

Zachos Milios (Greek: Ζάχος Μήλιος; 1805–1860) was a Greek revolutionary of the Greek War of Independence (1821–1830) and officer of the Hellenic army. He was the brother of the distinguished general and politician Spyros Milios.

== Greek War of Independence ==
Milios was born in Himara, in modern south coast Albania. At 1824, under the leadership of his brother Spyromilios, he together with several armed Himariotes descent to southern Greece in order to join the Revolution. There they fought against the Ottoman troops of Omer Vryonis, under the orders of Alexandros Mavrokordatos. At 1825, together with his brother, as well as Notis Botsaris and Dimos Riniassas participated in several conflicts in Aetolia region (Makrynoros, Kasteli Anatolikou). The same year they joined the besiegers in Missolonghi. Zachos also participated in the following exodus. Later he fought under the leadership of Georgios Karaiskakis.

Milios supported the political party of Alexandros Mavrokordatos and joined the Pro-Russian party. During Kapodistrias' rule (1828–1832) he became captain of the 2nd light infantry battalion.

== After Independence ==
When Otto became King of Greece (1832), he remained in the army serving as a frontier guard. He was considered a very loyal officer .

Zachos Milios reached the rank of Colonel. He was distinguished by his bravery on the battlefield (he was seriously wounded four times).

== Sources ==
- British documents on foreign affairs: reports and papers from the Foreign Office confidential print. Kenneth Bourne, David Stevenson, Donald Cameron Watt, John F. V. Keiger, Great Britain. University Publications of America, 1991. ISBN 978-0-89093-610-8
