= Nivica =

Nivica is an Albanian surname. Notable people with the surname include:

- Hodo Nivica (1809–1852), Albanian revolutionary
- Sali Nivica (1890–1920), Albanian politician and journalist
