= Acroceraunian School =

- Ακροκεραύνιος Σχολή
- Kastro; Vlorë County; Himarë; Albania

Information
- Founded: 1779; 247 years ago
- Founder: Kosmas the Aetolian
- Website: omiros-himara.europe.sch.gr

The Acroceraunian School (Greek: Ακροκεραύνιος Σχολή, Akrokeravnios Scholi) is a Greek elementary school in the town of Himarë, Albania. It was founded in 1779 by Kosmas the Aetolian and throughout its history has been associated with the Greek culture of the area. After World War II it was forcibly closed by the communist regime of Albania, but it reopened in 2006 after almost 60 years.

== Background ==
The first school in Himara, a Greek language school, was founded in 1627 by the Catholic missionary Neophytos Rodinos. During the following years Greek schools opened in the nearby villages, Dhërmi and Palasa.

== Foundation ==
The foundation of the school is associated with the travels of the Greek-Orthodox monk and missionary Kosmas the Aetolian. During his trips in the Ottoman-ruled Balkans, he founded some 200 Greek-language schools in what is now southern Albania . When he visited Himara in 1779, legend says that he told the locals to destroy part of the nearby All Saints Church in order to build the school with this material.

== Prohibition of Education ==
In 1945, the totalitarian leadership of the People's Socialist Republic of Albania under Enver Hoxha declared that Greek language education would be allowed only in the officially recognized the "minority zones" which consisted of 99 villages. The Himara region was not included in this zone and as a result the use of Greek language was forbidden in school and other public places.

== Modern era ==
After many years of efforts, following a decision of the Council of the European Union, a private Greek school was opened in Himara on May 5, 2006. The school operates as part of the Omiros ("Homer") network of educational institutions, in the same building it operated in the pre-1945 period, inside the Castle of Himara (locally called Kastro).

Although the region of Himara still is not part of the recognized Greek minority area, the curriculum follows the program of a minority school. The language of instruction is predominantly Greek, while Albanian is also taught. Moreover, the schools offers to non-pupils lessons in Greek language and culture.
