= Bangas Gymnasium =

Bangas Gymnasium of Korytsa
- Μπάγκειο Γυμνάσιο Κορυτσάς
- Korcë; Ottoman Empire

Information
- Type: Secondary level male school
- Established: 1856
- Closed: 1930
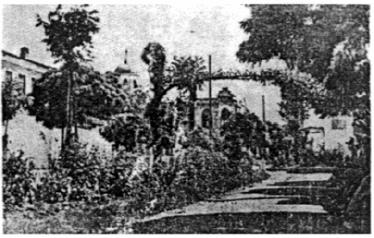
- Bangas Gymnasium facilities (before 1912)

The Bangas Gymnasium (Greek: Μπάγκειο Γυμνάσιο, romanized: Bangeio Gymnasio) or Gymnasium of Korytsa, was a Greek secondary level school in Korcë (Greek: Korytsa), southern Albania, from 1856 to 1930. It was named after its benefactor, Ioannis Pangas (or Bangas). The Bangas Gymnasium became one of the most significant Greek educational institutions in the region during the late period of Ottoman rule.

== History ==
=== Ottoman period ===
Greek education was thriving in Korcë during the last period of Ottoman rule, with the creation of kindergartens, primary and secondary level boys' schools, as well as girls' schools. Secondary level education was present in Korcë already from 1724, with the establishment of the Hellenic (Greek) School.

The Gymnasium of Korytsa was founded in 1856, though during the first years of operation it was hosted in the facilities of the Hellenic School. In 1863, the Gymnasium consisted of five classes and started to operate in a new separate building, erected with the support of the local community fund, the Lasso. The latter aimed at the promotion of Greek cultural and educational activity in Korce. In 1889 a sixth class was added, thus providing full middle level education according to the Greek educational standards of that time.

The costs of the Gymnasium were initially covered by the Greek consulate of Bitola. However, due to limited funding the school had to rely on local initiatives. In 1889, the national benefactor, entrepreneur and member of the local diaspora, Ioannis Pangas, took the initiative and subsidized educational and cultural projects, for the benefit of the Greek people in general. Among his initiatives, was an offer of 18,000 French francs, on annual basis, for the needs of the Gymnasium, including coverage of the teachers salary payments. Pangas, after whom the school was named, became also the main contributor of the Lasso.

The teaching staff of the Bangas Gymnasium consisted mainly of university graduates, most of whom had studied at the University of Athens, as well as at the Athens Polytechnic and the Halki Seminary, Constantinople (Istanbul), and other institutions. On the other hand, the majority of the students (ca. 70%) were natives of Korce, while the rest came from the surrounding towns and villages. The school provided also the necessary accommodation for the non-native students.

=== 1912-1930 ===
During the Balkan Wars, the building of the Gymnasium was used as barracks by the Ottoman troops and then by the Greek Army. The latter entered the city on December 7, 1912, as a result of the Ottoman retreat in the region. Following the armed struggle for the establishment of the Autonomous Republic of Northern Epirus (1914), a part of the older students joined the Northern Epirote army, while some of them were arrested and imprisoned by the Albanian gendarmerie.

With the final incorporation of Korcë in Albania (1920), Greek education was prohibited in the city, as the city was not part of the recognized Greek minority zone by the state. Nevertheless, the Bangas Gymnasium continued its operation for some years, as a religious academy (Greek: Μπάγκειο Ιεροδιδασκαλείο Bageio Ierodidaskaleio) under the direction of Vasileios Ioannidis. It ceased its operation in 1930.

== Academics ==
The school program was supervised by the Committee for the Support of Greek Education and the Orthodox Church. The curriculum emphasized humanistic, but especially classical education. Greek language lessons covered 37% of teaching hours. Teaching of the Greek language was conducted in the conservative katharevousa as well as in archaic Greek form used in ecclesiastical education. Archaic Greek was helpful in the understanding of ancient and ecclesiastical manuscripts, however, it wasn't helpful in everyday communication. For this reason the teaching staff also used vernacular Greek in direct interactions with the students. On the other hand, katharevousa was also helpful in the direction to promote a purely and strictly national education, according to Greek educational standards.

Additional subjects included mathematics, history, French, Latin, Turkish, religion, geography and philosophy. The bibliography used in the Gymnasium was similar to that of the Greek middle level schools in general, however, there were also books about the history of the city and the surrounding region, as well as translations of non-Greek books.

After a proposal by the local metropolitan bishop Photios, gymnastics became also part of the school program in the 1903-1904 schoolyear. During the 1905-1906 schoolyear, the Gymnasium organized gymnastics events, which were open to the public. In general, bishop Photios was interested in the general education of the city's youth and often made various proposal for its improvement. The students were also taught music.

Written exams were held three times each season: middle December, end February and middle May. Moreover, celebrations in the Gymnasium took place on every January 7, the day of Saint John the Baptist, name day of Ioannis Pangas.

== Notable teachers ==
- Panteleimon Kotokos
- Vasileios Ioannidis

== Notable alumni ==
- Theophrastos Georgiadis

== Sources ==
- Ismyrliadou, Adelais; Karathanasis, Athanasios (1996). "Educational and Economic Activities in the Greek Community of Koritsa". Balkan Studies. 37: 235–255.
- Koltsida, Athina (2008). Η Εκπαίδευση στη Βόρειο Ήπειρο κατά την Ύστερη Περίοδο της Οθωμανικής Αυτοκρατορίας (pdf) (in Greek). University of Thessaloniki.
