= Lasso fund =

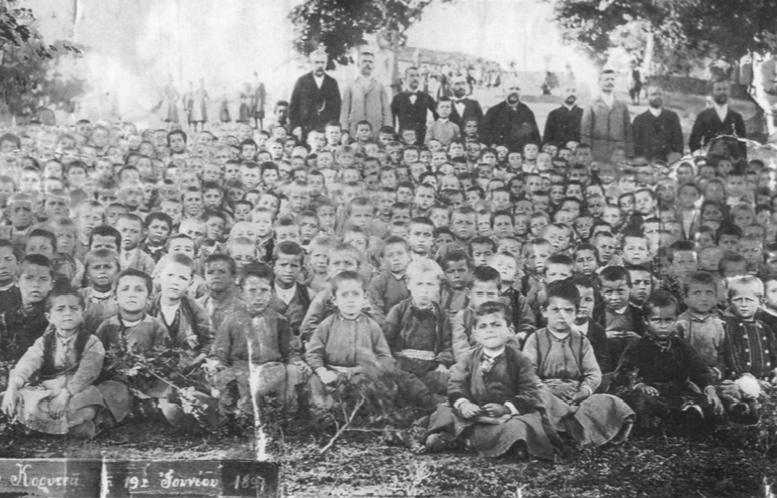
Students and teachers of the Greek Urban School, sponsored by the 'Lasso' (1897)

Lasso Fund (Greek: Ταμείο Λάσσον) was a community fund established in the town of Korçë in 1850 in order to safeguard donations and bequests of the local Orthodox diaspora. As a result, Greek-language schools for the Orthodox community as well as churches, pharmacies and hostels were opened in Korçë.

== Regulations ==
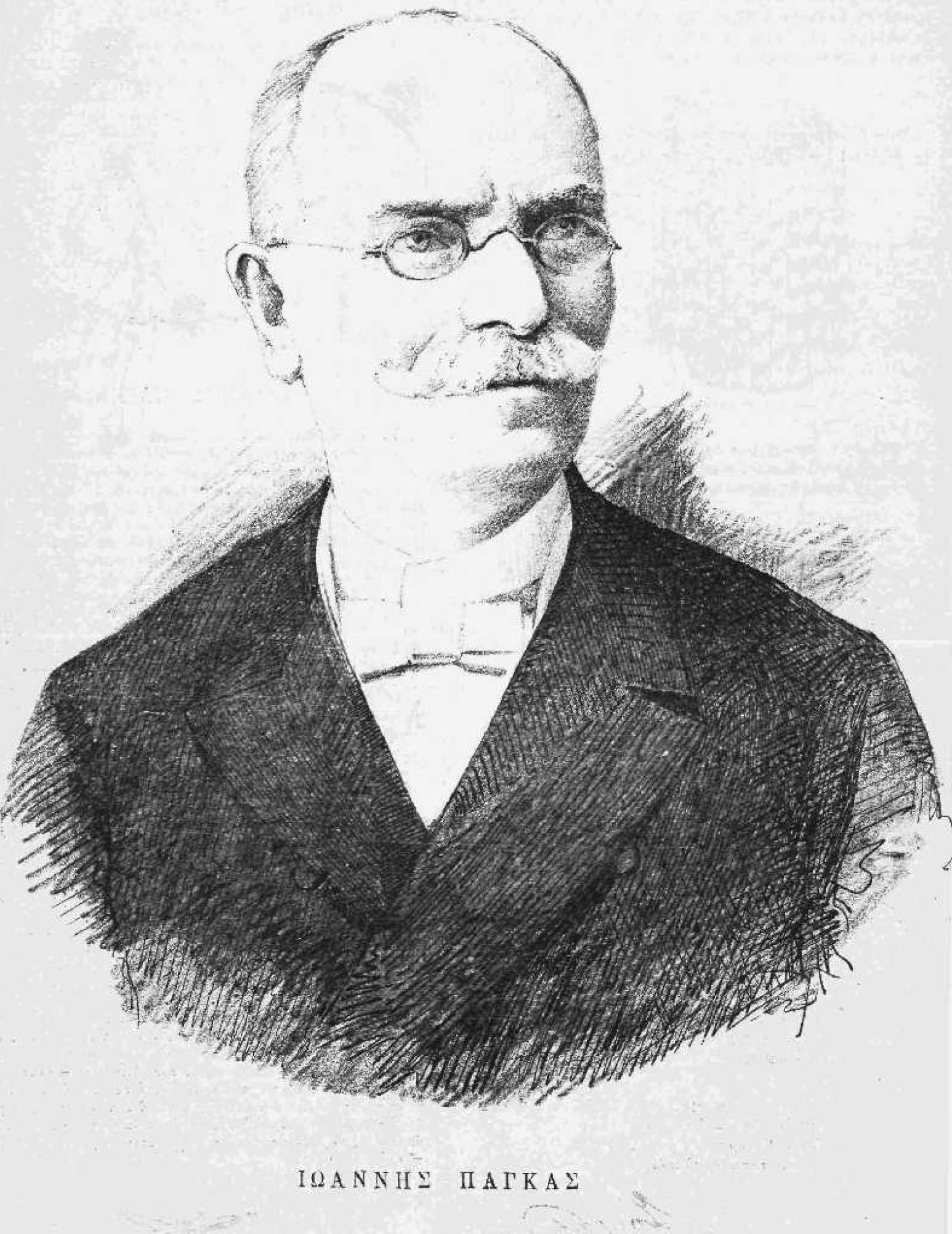
Ioannis Pagkas, one of the main contributors of the Lasso fund

In 1850 the Orthodox bishop of Korçë, Neophytus, decided to create a special community fund in order to safeguard the various donations and bequests from the Orthodox diaspora of the city and to ensure that they would be properly disposed for educational and cultural purposes. This fund, was known under the name Lasso fund. According to article 2 of the fund's statute the primary objective of Lasso fund was:

the upkeep of the common Schools in the city for the dissemination of Greek letters and enlightenment to all classes of citizens of both sexes, only from its interest, with the capital remaining untouched.

Its harmonious management was presented as a basic duty of the community. In 1875, the "General Regulations of the Common Foundation of the Town Korytsa (Korçë)" were drafted and put into effect the next year. Under these all bequest and donations were taken under the responsibility of the Lasso fund. The general organization of the Lasso was reminiscent to the English trusts law of that time. The capital of the fund was deposited in the National Bank of Greece in an account titled "Assets of the Educational Institutions of Korytsa" with an annual depreciation rate of 6% on the capital circulating in the form of bonds. According to the special regulations of the Lasso, the local schools were maintained exclusively by its interest, while only a part of the capital was given to solvent citizens in the form of interest-bearing loans.

== Significant contributors ==
This initiative resulted in the increase of cultural activity in Korçë, especially in the foundation of Orthodox schools, as well the erection of other public welfare institutions such as churches, pharmacies and hostels. Among the benefactors that contributed to the Lasso fund was Georgios Pagkas, who supported it with considerable sums. Other significant contributors included the son of the latter, Ioannis Pagkas, in particular with the sponsoring of the Pagkas Gymnasium, and Anastas Avramidhi-Lakçe and Kostaq Duro, heads of the Albanian cultural institution Dituria in Romania.

== Sources ==
- Ismyrliadou, Adelais (1996). "Educational and Economic Activities in the Greek Community of Koritsa during the Second Half of the Nineteenth Century". Balkan Studies. 1 (37): 235–255.
