= Panarit =

- Village
- Location within Albania
- Coordinates: 40°29′4″N 20°28′24″E
- Country: Albania
- County: Korçë
- Municipality: Korçë
- Administrative unit: Vithkuq
- Time zone: UTC+1 (CET)
  - Summer (DST): UTC+2 (CEST)

Panarit (Albanian definite form: Panariti) is a community in the Korçë County, southeastern Albania which became part of the municipality Korçë during the 2015 local government reform.

== Notable people ==
- Iljaz Hoxha, famous janissary and founder of the first mosque in Korçë;
- Gjergj Panariti, Albanian painter of the 19th century
