= Anastas Avramidhi-Lakçe =

Albanian businessman and benefactor (1821–1890)

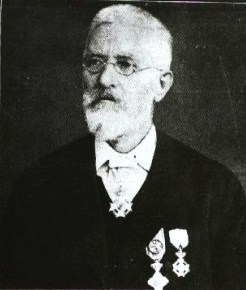
- Anastas Avramidhi-Lakshe
- Born: 1821; Korçë, Albania, then Ottoman Empire
- Died: 1890 (aged 69); Bucharest, Kingdom of Romania
- Occupation: Businessman
- Known for: Benefactory deeds

Anastas Avramidhi-Lakçe or Anastas Avram-Lakçe (1821–1890) was an Albanian businessman and benefactor. Avramidhi was born in Korçë, in modern southeastern Albania, then part of the Ottoman Empire. When he was young he migrated to Bucharest, Romania, where he became a successful businessman.

== Life ==
Avramidhi was born in Korçë. He moved to Bucharest where he became a successful businessman and planned on awarding his fortune to the inhabitants of his hometown. Thus, he sponsored the foundation and function of several educational, and cultural institutions as well as religious ones. The local Orthodox cathedral of Saint George, was renovated due to his sponsorship. In January 1885 in Romania he became one of the founding members and the president of the Albanian association Drita (English: Light), later renamed to Dituria (English: Knowledge).

He also intended to support the foundation of an Albanian school in Korçë and supported the cause of individuals like Thimi Marko, who was trying to establish Albanian schools. In 1888 he published a book written in Albanian and translated in French, Greek and Romanian titled "To Albanians from an Albanian". The book dealt primarily with the importance of education in the Albanian language. In his last will he left his fortune to associations promoting Albanian education, but his testament was blocked by the Ecumenical Patriarchate of Constantinople. Anastas Avramidhi named as the executor of his last will Orhan Pojani, an activist of the Albanian National Awakening. Although he initially intended to support the foundation of the first Albanian school in Korçë, after discussions with representatives of the Orthodox Church of the city he didn't sponsor this initiative.

He finally made donations to his hometown, Korçë, subsisting the foundation and function of several Greek educational, cultural and religious institutions. When died he donated his entire fortune to the local Trust fund, called Lasso, created for the support of Greek cultural activities in Korçë.
