= Mirahori Mosque =

Mosque in Korçë City, Korçë County, Albania

Iljaz Mirahori Mosque
- Xhamia e Iljaz Mirahorit
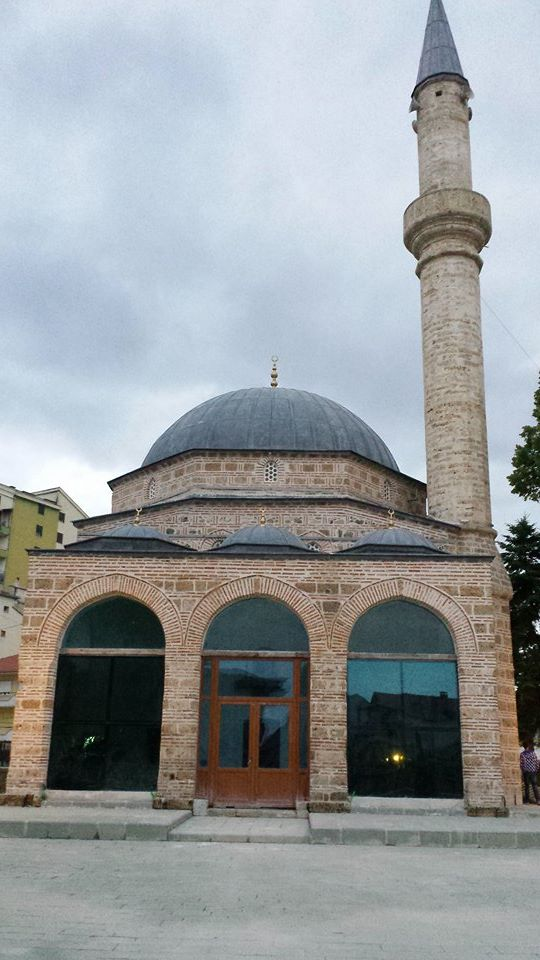
- The mosque in 2014

- Location of the mosque in Albania

Religion
- Affiliation: Islam
- Ecclesiastical or organisational status: Mosque: (1496–c. 1946); (since 1991– )
- Status: Active

Location
- Location: Korçë
- Country: Albania
- Interactive map of Iljaz Mirahori Mosque
- Coordinates: 40°36′57″N 20°46′31″E

Architecture
- Type: Islamic architecture
- Style: Ottoman
- Founder: Iljaz bej Mirahori
- Completed: 1496 CE

Specifications
- Dome: 1
- Minaret: 1

Cultural Monument of Albania
- Official name: Iljaz Mirahori Mosque
- Reference no.: KO104

The Iljaz Mirahori Mosque (Albanian: Xhamia e Iljaz Mirahorit), or more simply the Mirahor Mosque, is a mosque in Korçë, Albania, built in 1494 by Iljaz bej Mirahori who also founded the town.

== History ==
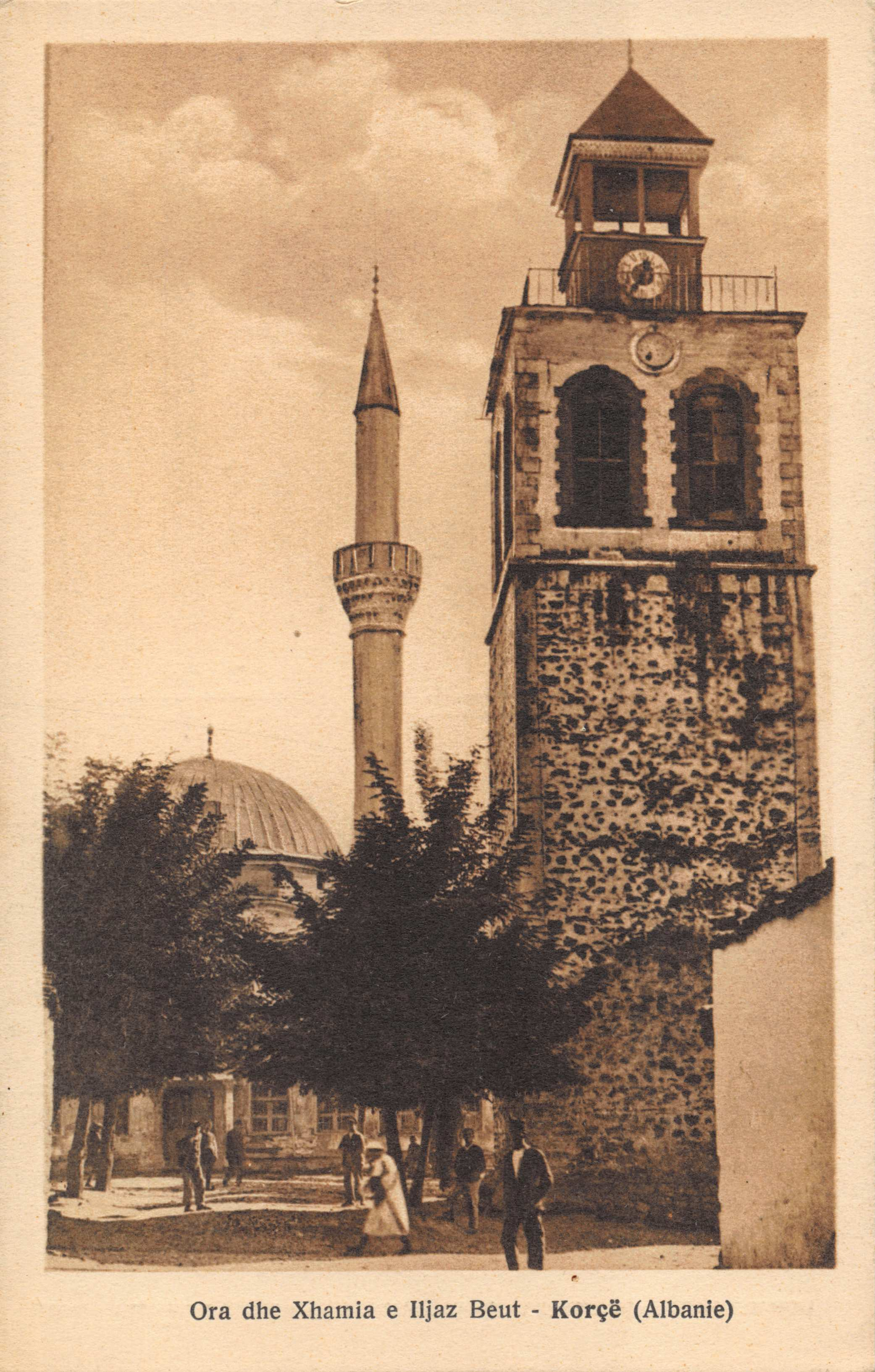
The mosque with a bigger sherefe (minaret balcony) than today (1934)

The mosque, identified by an inscription above its entrance as having been built in 1494–95, is one of the oldest in Albania. It features a square prayer hall topped by a single dome, a three-domed entrance porch, and finely crafted cloisonné masonry. Its minaret, first damaged by the Greeks and French until 1917 and then lost in an earthquake in the early 1960s, was rebuilt after 2006. Historically, the mosque served as the core of a larger architectural complex that included an imaret, bakery, storage rooms, a han, a hamam, and a mekteb. Iljaz bej Mirahori, a Korça-born official who rose to prominence under Sultan Bayezid II, endowed five villages to finance this and other constructions. His goal was to elevate the small settlement into a Muslim town, which, according to Ottoman law, required the presence of both a Friday mosque and a marketplace for residents to be registered as townspeople rather than peasants. According to the writer Sami Frashëri, it was built on the foundations of an existing monastery, then called dedicated to Saint Paraskevi (Kisha e Shën e Premtes).

The Iliaz Mirahor Mosque was designated as a religious Cultural Monument of Albania.

== Gallery ==
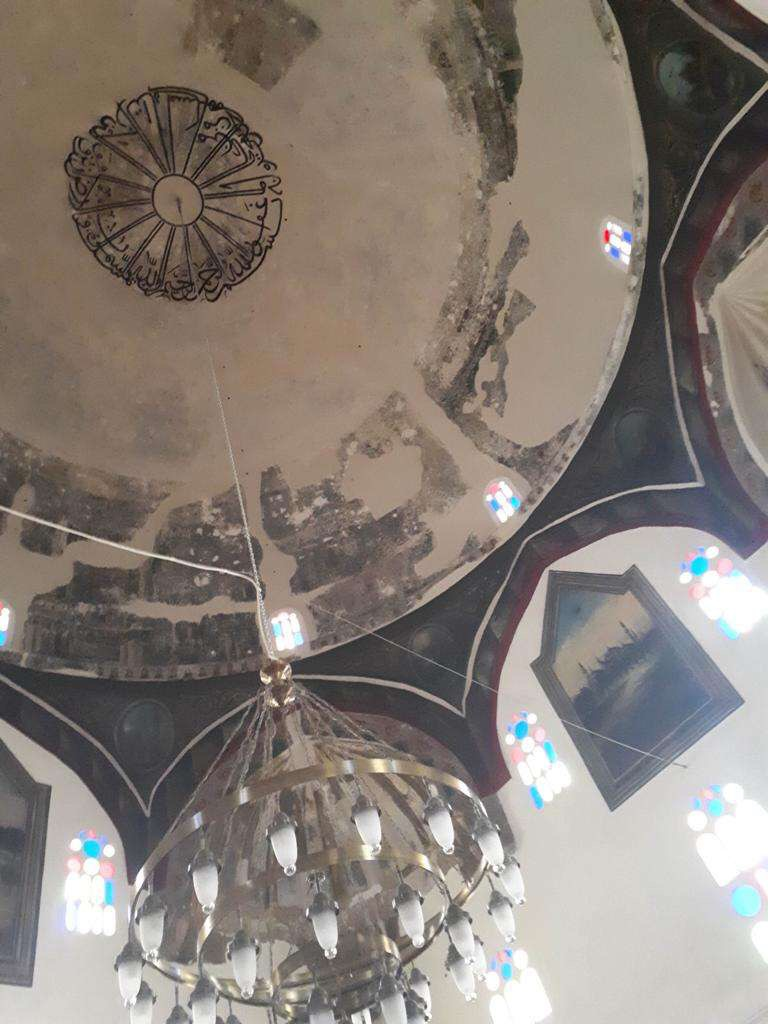
The historical ceiling of the mosque of which parts of the frescoes got lost and had to be restored

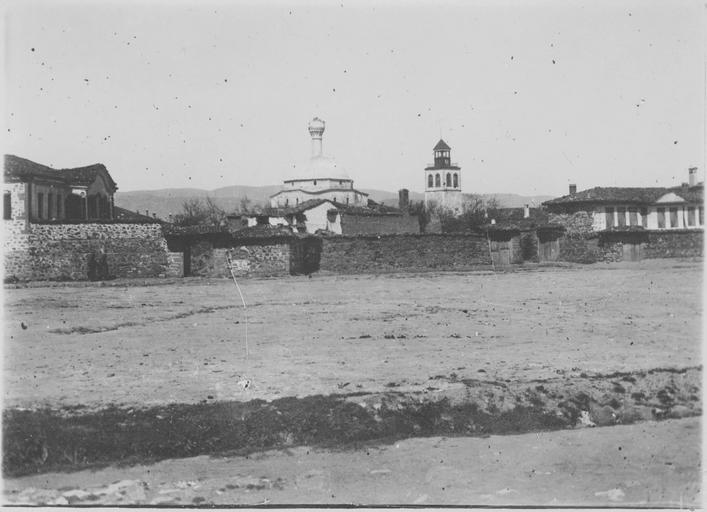
The mosque with its minaret destroyed by the Greeks and French in 1917

== See also ==
- Islam in Albania
- List of mosques in Albania
