= Korçë =

Eighth largest city of Albania

Korçë Korça
- Municipality
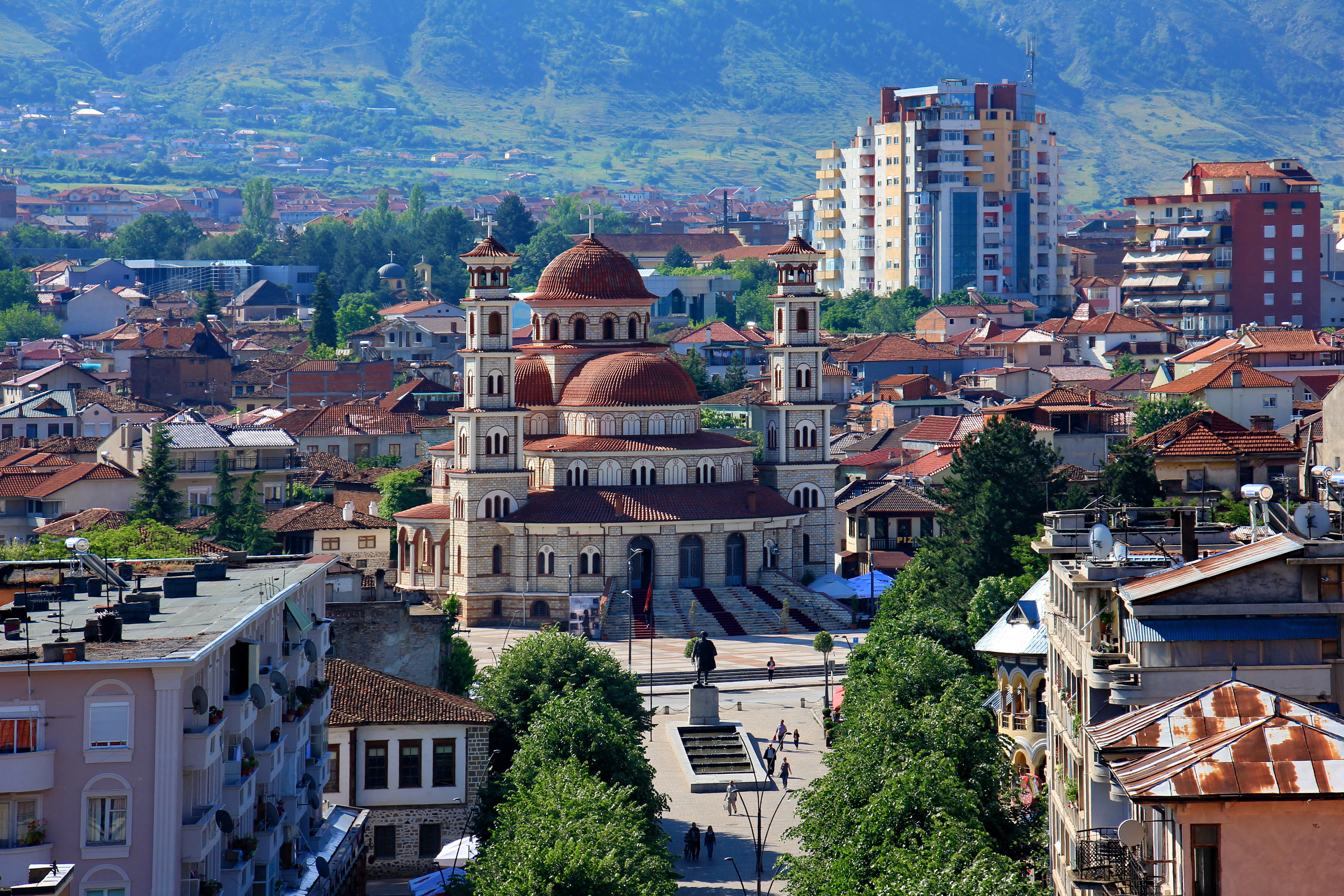
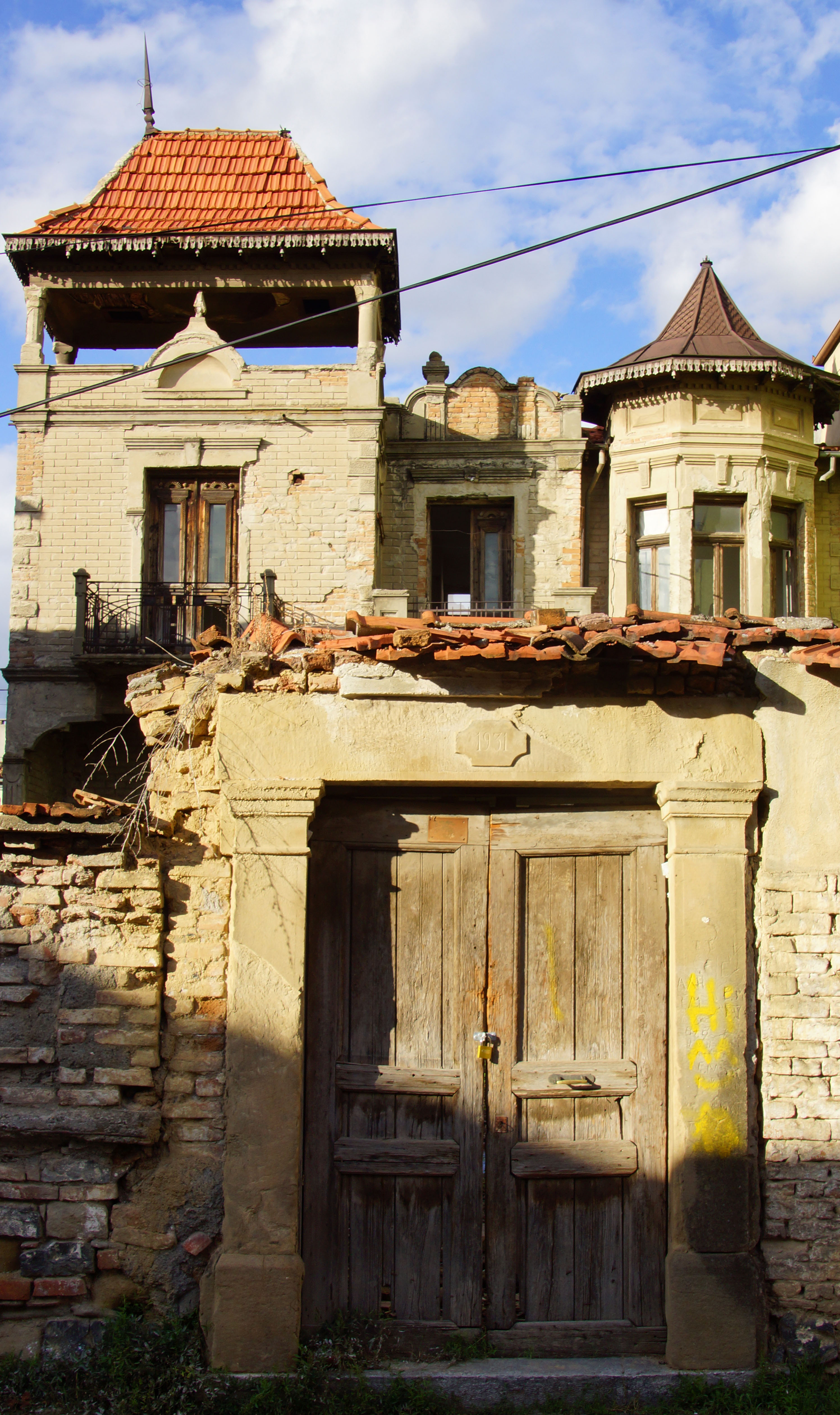
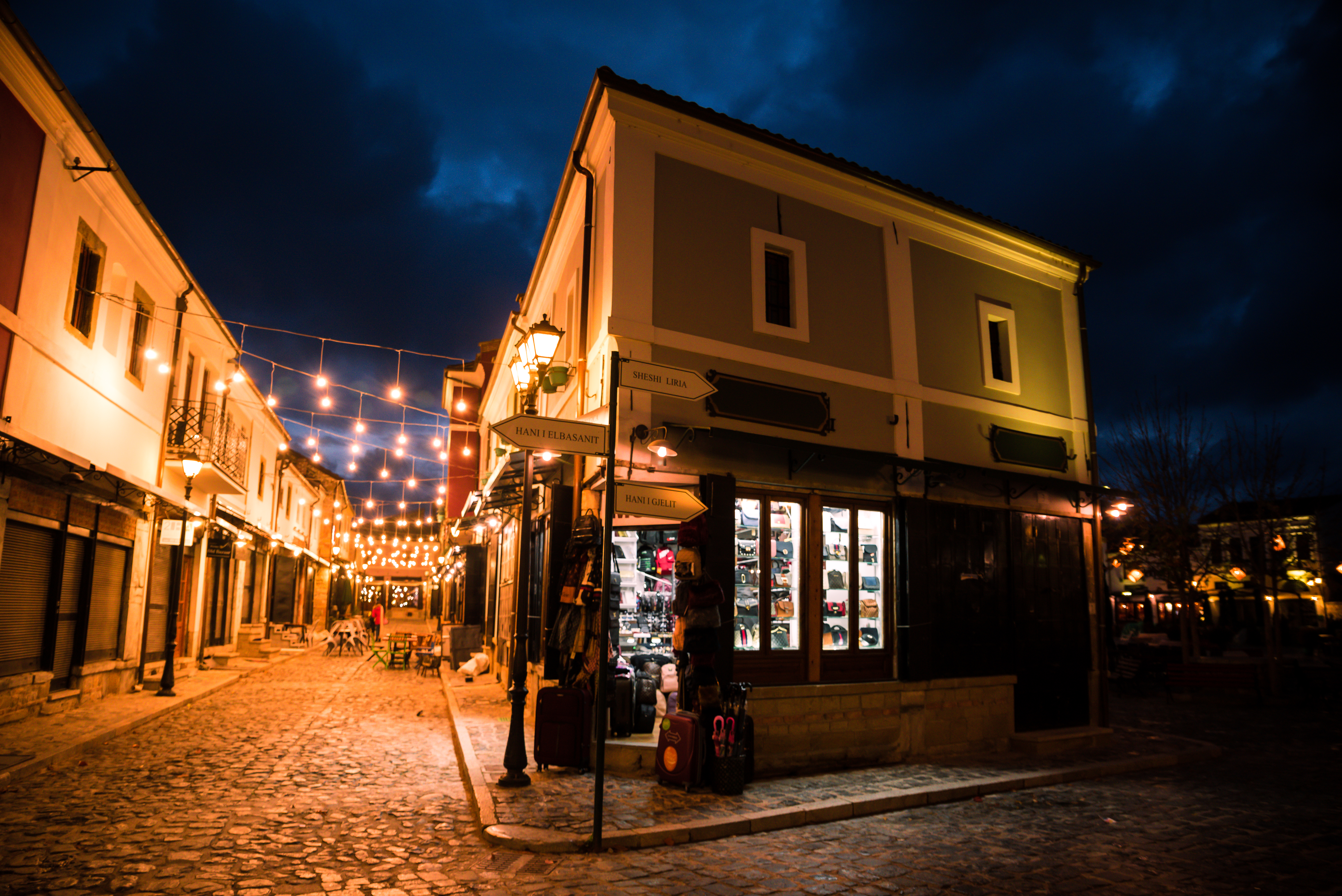
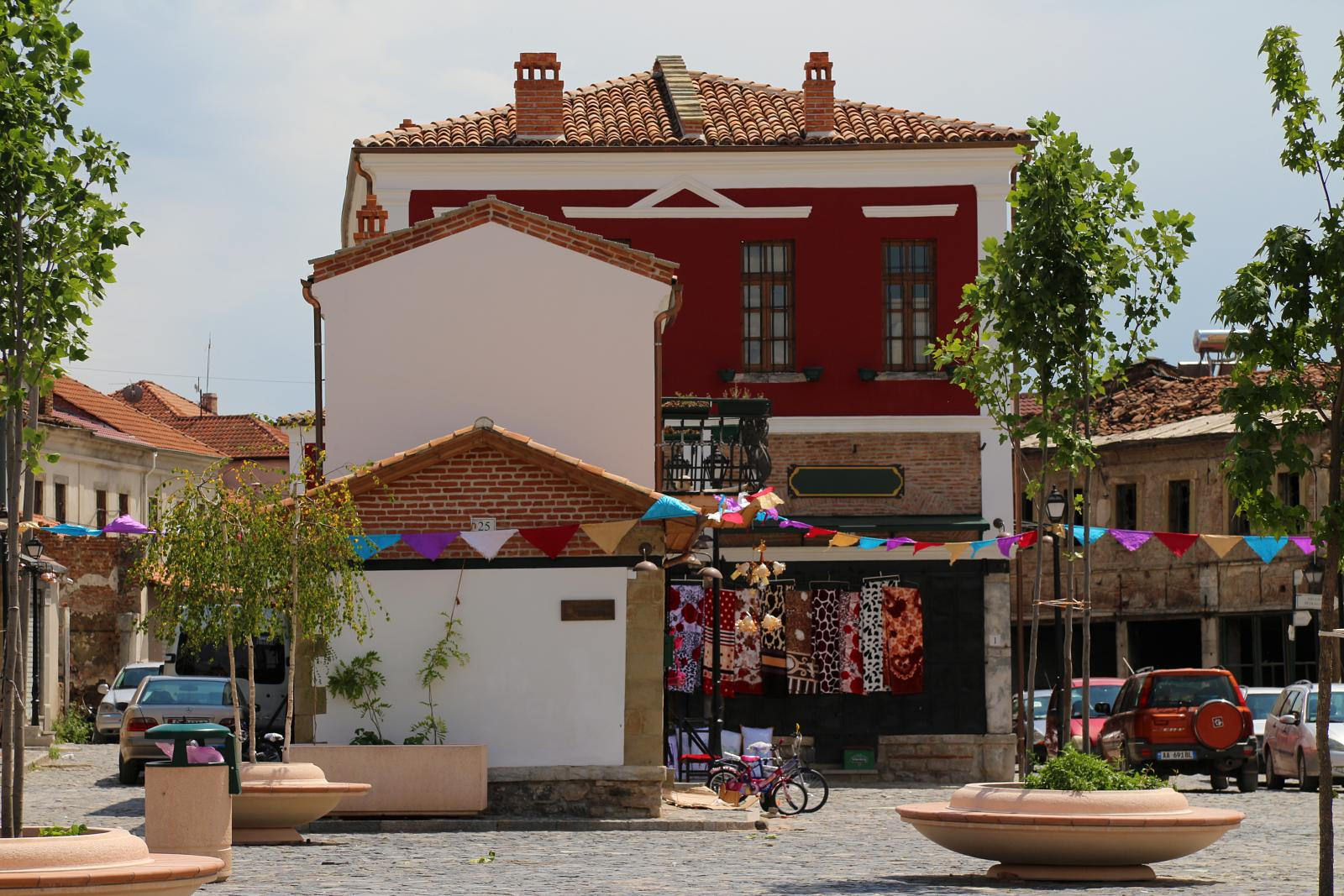
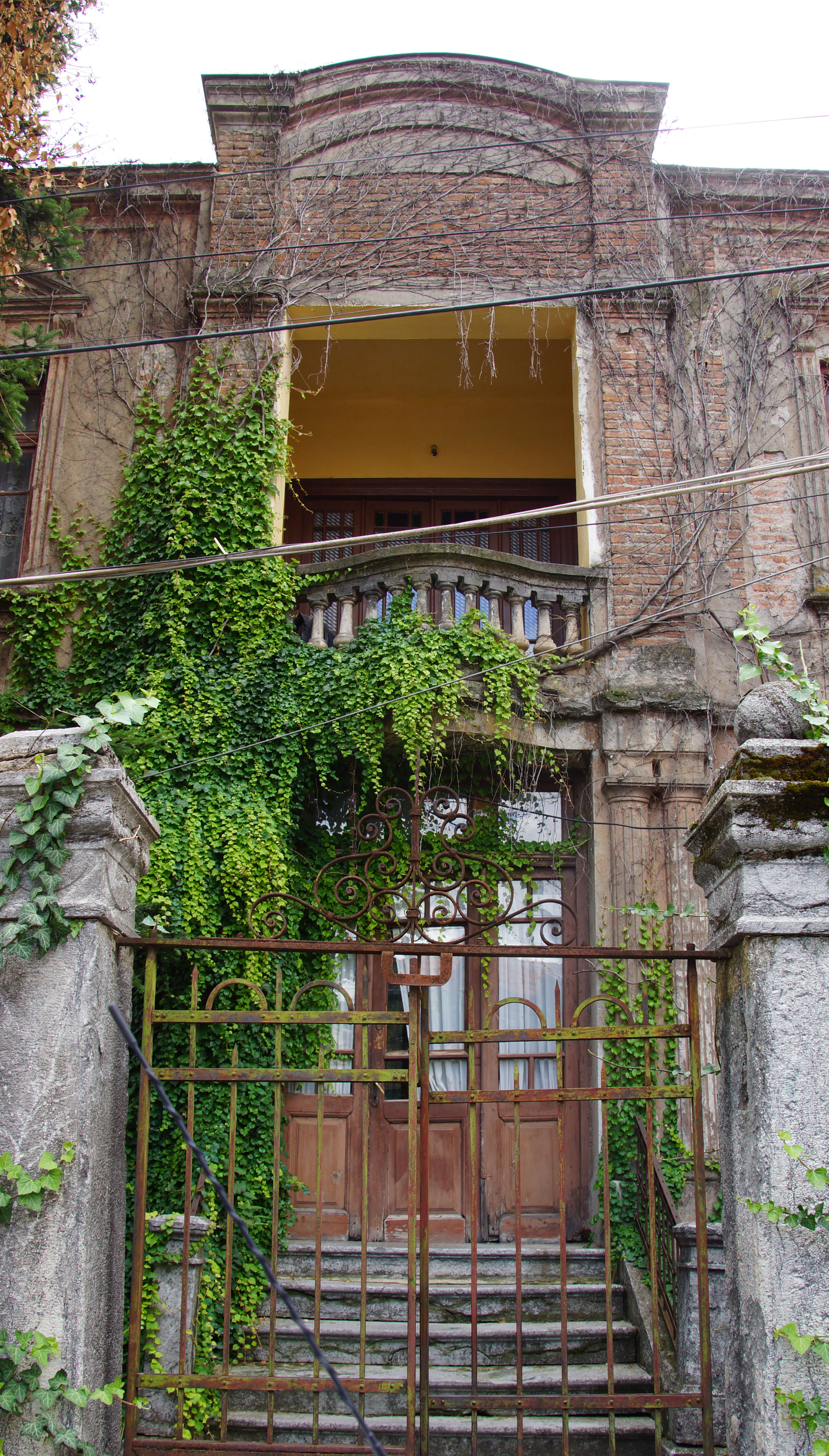
- Top to bottom, left to right: View over Korçë and the Resurrection Cathedral, House Çeva, Old Bazaar by night, Traditional architecture around the Old Bazaar and House Lubonja

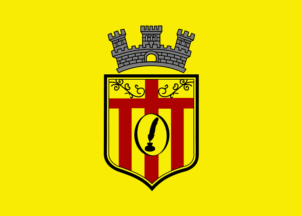
- Flag Emblem

- Location within Albania
- Coordinates: 40°37′N 20°46′E
- Country: Albania
- County: Korçë
- Settled: 15th century AD

Government
  - Mayor: Sotiraq Filo (PS)

Area
  - Municipality: 806 km^{2} (311 sq mi)
  - Administrative unit: 6.62 km^{2} (2.56 sq mi)
- Elevation: 850 m (2,790 ft)

Population (2023)
  - Municipality: 60,754
  - Municipality density: 75.4/km^{2} (195/sq mi)
  - Administrative unit: 43,254
  - Administrative unit density: 6,530/km^{2} (16,900/sq mi)
- Demonym(s): Albanian: Korçar (m), Korçare (f)
- Time zone: UTC+1 (CET)
  - Summer (DST): UTC+2 (CEST)
- Postal Code: 7000
- Area Code: (0)82
- Website: bashkiakorce.gov.al

Korçë (pronounced [ˈkɔɾtʃə]; Albanian definite form: Korça) is the eighth most populous city of Albania and the seat of Korçë County and Korçë Municipality. The total population of the city was 51,152 and 75,994 of Korçë municipality (2011 census), in a total area of 806 km^{2} (311 sq mi). It stands on a plateau some 850 m (2,789 ft) above sea level, surrounded by the Morava Mountains.

The area of the Old Bazaar, including Mirahori Mosque, is considered as the urban core of the city. Founded by the local Ottoman Albanian nobleman Ilias Bey Mirahori, the urban area of Korçë dates back to the late 15th century and the beginning of the 16th century, however its actual physiognomy was realized in the 19th century, during a period that corresponds with the rapid growth and development of the city. The Old Bazaar has played a dominant role in Albania's market history. Korçë is the largest city of eastern Albania and an important cultural and industrial centre.

== Name ==
Korçë is named differently in other languages: Aromanian: Curceaua, Curceauã, Curceau or Curciau; Bulgarian, Macedonian and Serbian: Горица, Goritsa; Greek: Κορυτσά, Korytsa; Italian: Coriza; Romanian: Corcea or Corița; Turkish: Görice. The current name is of Slavic origin. The word "gorica" means "hill" in South Slavic languages, and is a very common toponym in Albania and Slavic countries (e.g. Podgorica in Montenegro, Gorizia, Dolna Gorica in the Pustec municipality, and so on). It is diminutive of the Slavic toponym "gora", meaning mountain, which is also found in placenames throughout Slavic countries as well as non-Slavic countries like Albania, Greece, Italy and Kosovo.

== History ==
=== 15th century ===
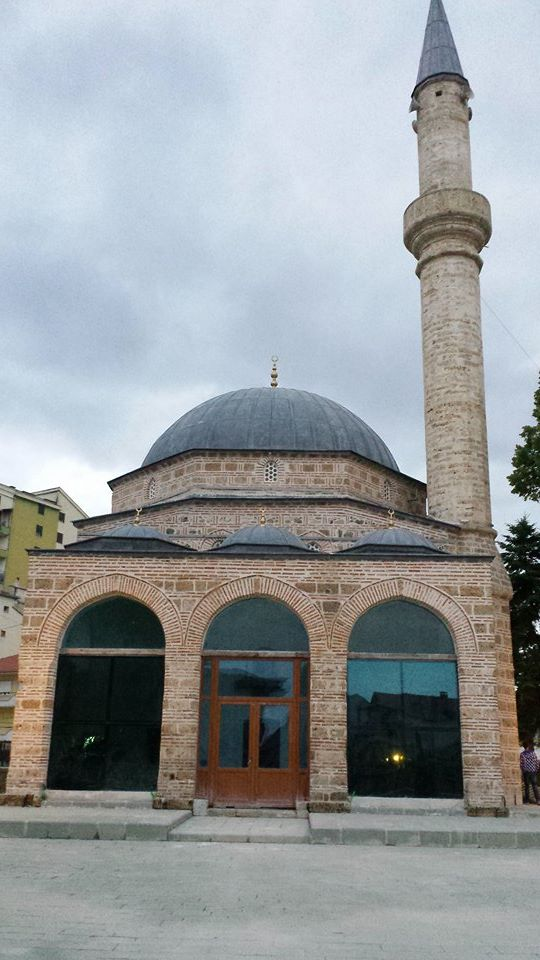
Mirahori Mosque, Korçë. Built between 1484 and 1495 by Iljaz Bey Mirahor, it is Albania's second oldest mosque and one of the most important examples of Islamic architecture of the country.

Korçë's foundation is closely related with the actions of Ilias Bey Mirahori, a Muslim Albanian convert born in the village of Panarit in the Korçë area, who acquired large properties in the location of present-day Korçë. Ilias Bey was the 'Master of the Stables' of Sultan Bayezid II, and the first equerry and conqueror of Psamathia in the Ottoman capture of Constantinople. In 1484 Ilias Bey received, as a reward from the Sultan, seven villages located in the Korçë area: Leshnjë, Vithkuq, Peshkëpi, Boboshticë, Panarit, Treska, and Trebicka. This accord was finalized gradually through four firmans. In the first firman Leshnjë and Vithkuq were accorded to Ilias Bey as mülk (land tenure). However he met difficulties while collecting the incomes and after twelve years these villages turned into their earlier status of timars, being substituted through a second firman in the year 1497 by the locality Piskopiye, which included two sections. In the third firman (1497) the boundaries of Piskopiye were defined, establishing its demarcation between Mborje, Barç and Bulgarec, a site area corresponding to the territory of today's Korçë city. As a product of this process, the town of Korçë dates from the end of the 15th century.

The name Gorica corresponded to an older fortified settlement, and was later attached to Piskopiye, which was a separate community, and as suggested by its name, a bishop's residence. Ilias Bey founded his works of charity in Piskopiye, building a mosque, an imaret and a muallim-hane and a hammam. Built between 1484 and 1495, the mosque, named after him, represents one of the most important examples of Islamic architecture of Albania and its second oldest mosque after the Sultan's Mosque of Berat. The name Episkopi in Greek signifies a sacred place for the Orthodox faith, however, it is not certain if it was a coincidence or an intended strategy to build a mosque on the site of an older Orthodox church or monastery. With the establishment of the religious, educational and charitable institutions in the area, Ilias Bey must have planned to make the village a local Islamic centre and to raise it to the rank of kasaba ("town"), through the registration of its inhabitants as citizens instead of farmers. Being subjected to the Kaza of Korça, the villages of Episkopi, Boboshtica, Leshnjë and Vithkuq were used in 1505 as sources of income on behalf of the five institutions of Ilias Bey's vakfa. The vakfa he founded also served the purpose of organizing the settlement of Muslim inhabitants in an area that was recently abandoned by the original Christian inhabitants.

The new town must have been dominated initially by the old castle of Mborje. Throughout the 15th century and the beginning of the 16th century the castle was maintained by the Ottomans. The Tapu Defter of 1519 records a cemaat of Christian müsellems in the castle. According to this document the village of Mborje (Emboryo), which depended on Korçë (Görice), numbered 88 households of Christians and 18 households of Muslims.

Korça was divided into two great neighborhoods: Varosh and Kasaba. In the 16th century Muslims constituted the 21% of the population of the town and inhabited Kasaba, which was subdivided into the smaller neighborhoods of Çarshi, Ratak, Qoshk and Dere, including the institutions established by Ilias Bey. The Christian population inhabited Varosh, which was subdivided in Varosh i Sipërm (Upper Varosh) and Varosh i Poshtëm (Lower Varosh). Varosh i Sipërm was further subdivided into the smaller neighborhoods of Mano, Barç, Jeni-Mahallë, Qiro, Penço, Manço, Manto and Kala, while Varosh i Poshtëm consisted only of Katavarosh, which was known also as "Lagja e Shën Mërisë", named after the Church that was located there.

Görice was incorporated as a sandjak in the Manastir Vilayet of the Ottoman Empire.

=== 18th century ===
When the nearby town of İskopol (Moscopole or Moschopolis or Voskopojë) was destroyed by Ali Pasha's men in 1769, some of its commerce shifted to Görice (Korçë) and Arnavud Belgrad (Berat). Korçë grew as part of its population came from nearby Moscopole. Greek sources (Liakos and Aravandinos) have noted of the Korçë Aromanian populations' origins that in addition to many being from Moscopole, others settled during a time of calm and were from the village of Shalës, Kolonjë and established the market district of Korçë known as Varosh. Aromanians from the Arvanitovlach subgroup that in the early 19th century arrived to the Korçë area played a significant role in establishing the Korçë Christian urban class. In Psalidas' work Geography from 1830 noted that in the district of Varosh in Korçë, 100 Aromanian families lived there.

According to French diplomat François Pouqueville there were 1,300 families living in the city in 1805 with two thirds of them being Christian. Korçë went from having a population of 8,200 (1875) to 18,000 (1905) and of those 14,000 adhered to Orthodox Christianity. Of those considered as Greek in Korçë, this was because they adhered to Orthodox Christianity, but Michael Palairet argues that most were probably Aromanians (Vlachs). Sources of the early 20th century report that the population was primarily ethnic Albanian. Greek was the language of the elite and the majority of the Aromanian population engaged in commerce, crafts and international trade becoming one of the wealthiest communities in Epirus and Macedonia. Albanians of Korçë were poor, engaging mostly in stockbreeding and agriculture. The inhabitants of the city spoke both Albanian and Greek.

Korçë's cultural isolation was reduced due to Greek schools, the first one being founded in the city at 1724. Subsequently, Muslim Albanian revolutionary intellectuals from the city emerged in the 1840s that wanted to preserve a Muslim Albania within a reformed Ottoman state. Due to increasing Hellenisation by the 1870s, those sentiments became replaced with the concept of an Albanian nation based on linguistic and cultural factors through struggle against a collapsing Ottoman Empire. During the late Ottoman era, Orthodox Albanians involved in the Albanian National Awakening came mainly from Korçë and its surrounding areas. On the other hand, the city council of Korçë, known as demogerontia (Greek: Δημογεροντία), and the metropolitan bishop of the city who identified as Greeks sent a secret memorandum to the foreign office department of Greece suggesting various ways to tackle activities by Albanian nationalists. In 1885, Jovan Cico Kosturi became the founder of a committee called the Albanian Cultural Society, along with co-founders Thimi Marko and Orhan Pojani, but the formation of the organization was suppressed by both the Ottoman and Orthodox Church authorities, so it went underground and carried on its activities as the Secret Committee of Korça (Albanian: Komiteti i Fshehtë i Korçës), and two years later, in March 1887, with the help of the Frashëri brothers, the Secret Committee set up the first Albanian school.

In the late Ottoman period, inhabitants from Korçë and surrounding areas emigrated abroad for economic opportunities, often by the Orthodox community who mainly as qualified craftsmen went to Romania, Greece and Bulgaria while Muslims went to Istanbul performing mainly menial labour work. Late nineteenth century Albanian migration to the United States consisted mainly of Orthodox Albanians from Korçë and surrounding areas who went to work there, save money and intending to eventually return home.

=== Rilindja ===
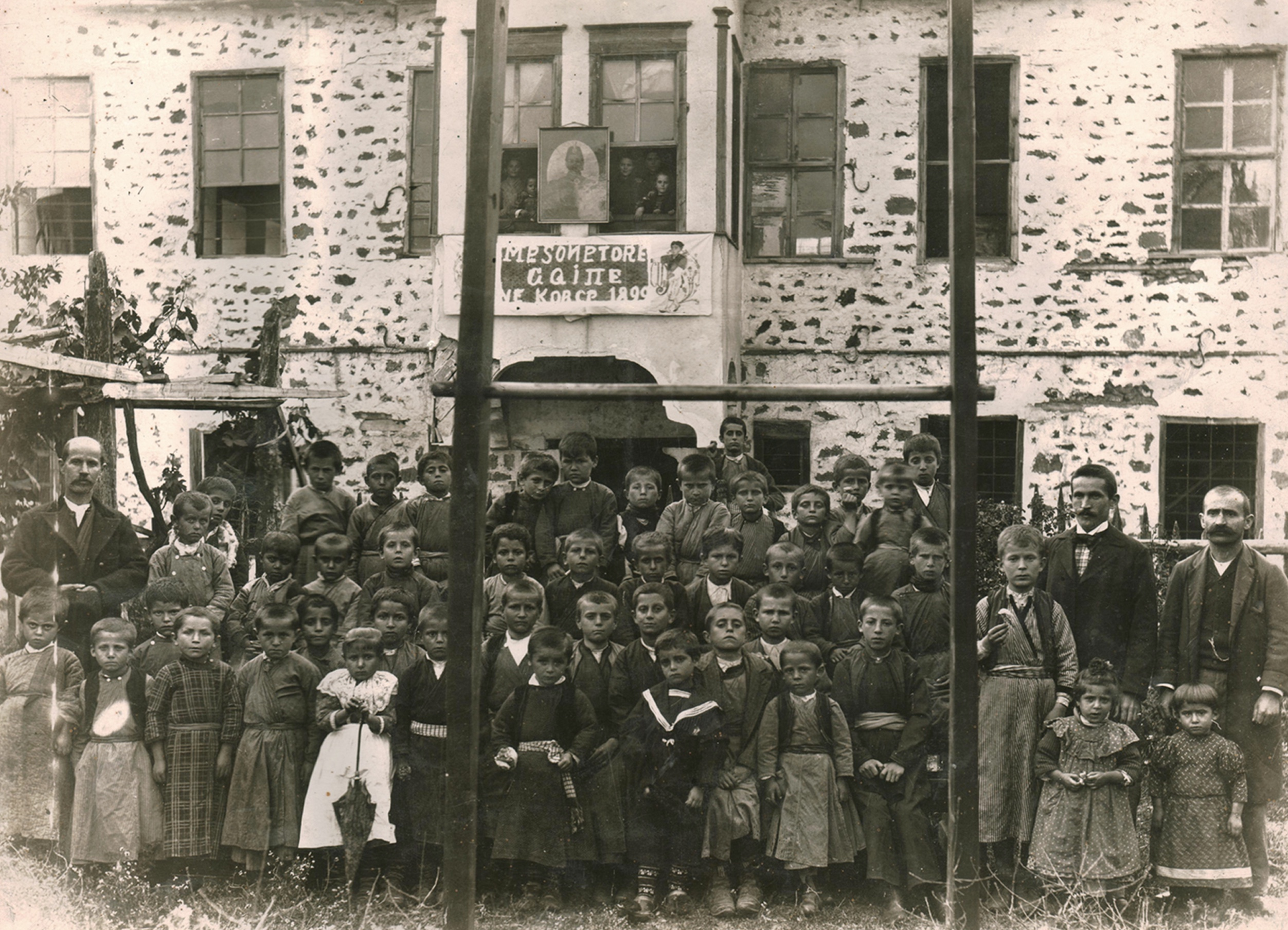
Students in front of the first officially recognized Albanian school in modern Albania, in 1899

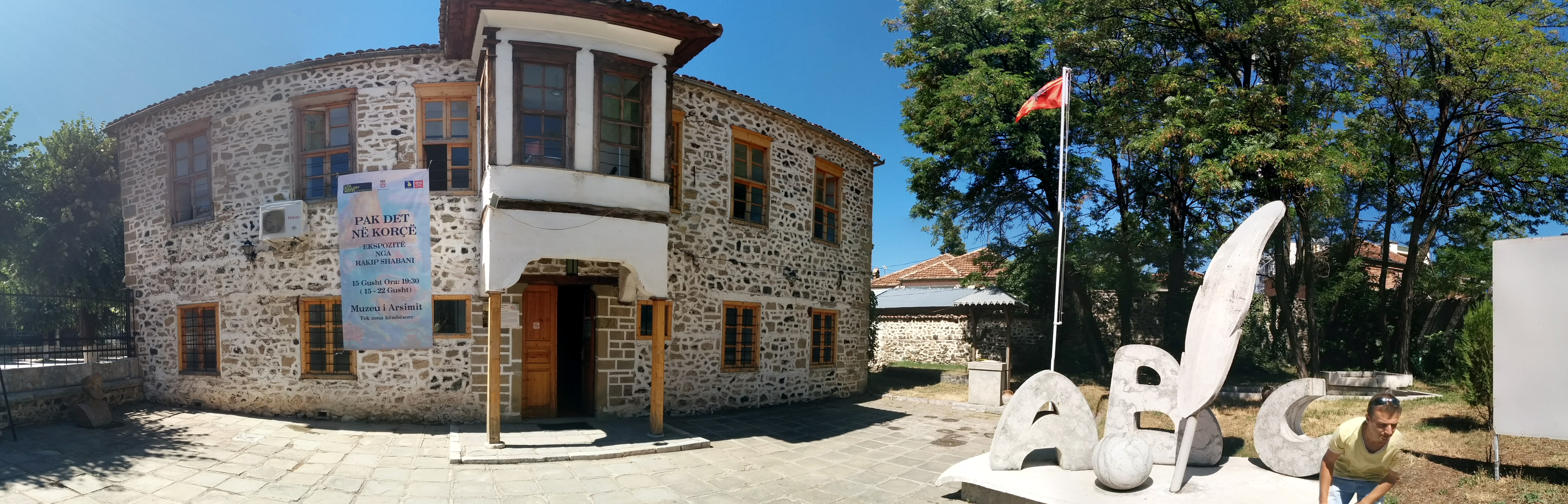
The building of former Albanian school that now serves as a museum

At beginning of the 18th century the inhabitants of Korçë attended the schools of nearby Moscopole. The first school, a Greek language school, in the city was established in 1724 with the support of residents of nearby Vithkuq. This school was destroyed during the Greek War of Independence but it reopened in 1830. In 1857 a Greek school for girls was operating in the city. During the 19th century various local benefactors such as Ioannis Pangas and Anastas Avramidhi-Lakçe donated money for the promotion of Greek education and culture in Korçë, such as the Bangas Gymnasium. Greek education was also financed by members of the diaspora in Egypt. Similarly, kindergartens, boarding and urban schools, were also operating in the city during this period. Under these developments, a special community fund, named the Lasso fund, was established in 1850 by the local Orthodox bishop Neophytos, in order to support Greek cultural activity in Korçë. At the eve of the Balkan Wars (1912) the total number of students attending Greek education in the city numbered 2,115.

Around 1850, Naum Veqilharxhi created an Albanian alphabet in which a few small books were published and the script briefly flourished in Korçë. At the end of the 19th century local Albanians expressed a growing need to be educated in their native language. The Albanian intellectual diaspora from Istanbul and Bucharest initially tried to avoid antagonism towards the notables of Korçë, who were in favor of Greek culture. Thus they suggested the introduction of Albanian language in the existing Greek Orthodox schools, a proposal which was discussed with the local bishop and the city council, the demogeronteia, and finally rejected by the Ecumenical Patriarchate of Constantinople. In the late 1870s the Albanian Committee of Patriots devised a Latin-based Albanian script which was also adopted by British and U.S. Protestant missionaries

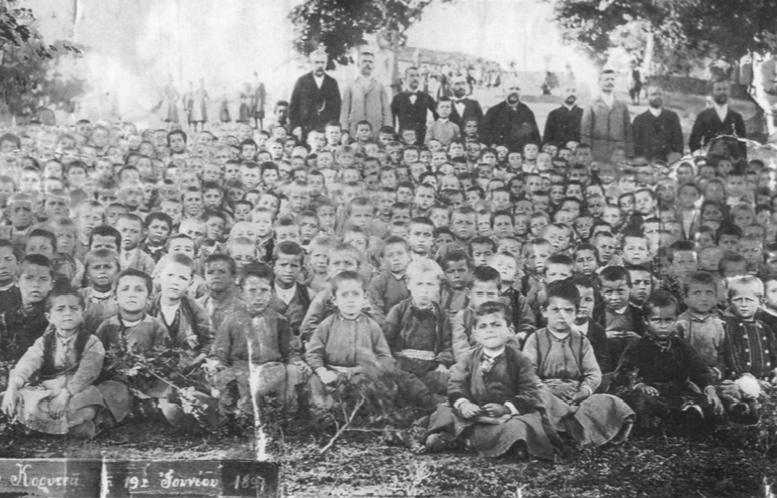
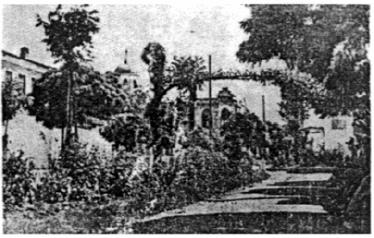
Students and teachers of the Greek Urban School, 1897 (left) and Bangas Gymnasium, early 20th century of the several institutions sponsored by the community Lasso fund (right)

The Central Committee for Defending Albanian Rights founded in the late 1870s promoting Albanian cultural development set up an Albanian secondary school for boys. The founding in 1884 of the boy's secondary school is regarded as the first Albanian school in Korçë and established in 1887 by the Drita (English: the Light) organization and funded by notable local individuals. Its first director was Pandeli Sotiri. Naim Frashëri, the national poet of Albania played a great role in the opening of the school. As a high-ranking statesman in the ministry of education of the Ottoman Empire he managed to get official permission for the school. The Ottoman authorities gave permission only for Christian children to be educated in Albanian, but the Albanians did not follow this restriction and allowed also Muslim children to attend. It survived until 1902 under the teachers Leonidis and Naum Naça who were arrested and declared as traitors by Ottoman authorities at the request of Greek clergy with the school being closed down, vandalised and wrecked. Albanian efforts for an Albanian school are represented in Greek sources as a failure due to weak demand and limited funding, but Palairet notes that Greek interference undermined the school. In the late 1880s Gjerasim Qiriazi began his Protestant mission in the city. He and fellow members of the Qiriazi family established Albanian speaking institutions in Korçë, with his sister Sevasti Qiriazi founding the first Albanian girls school in 1891. It was started by Gjerasim Qiriazi and later run by his sisters, Sevasti and Parashqevi Qiriazi, together with Polikseni Luarasi (Dhespoti). Later collaborators were the Rev. & Mrs. Grigor Cilka and Rev & Mrs. Phineas Kennedy of the Congregational Mission Board of Boston. Both schools were closed by the Ottoman authorities during 1902–1904.

When the city was under French administration in 1916 (the Republic of Korçë), Greek schools were closed and 200 Albanian schools were opened. In the city of Korçë itself, four primary schools opened, and one secondary school opened and functioned quite successfully. A plebiscite was held and voters indicated that they wanted the Albanian schools to stay open. However, a few months later Greek schools were reopened as a reward and result of Greece's adherence to the Entente alliance along with France. Particularly relevant was the opening in 1917 of the Albanian National Lyceum.

=== 1878–1914 ===
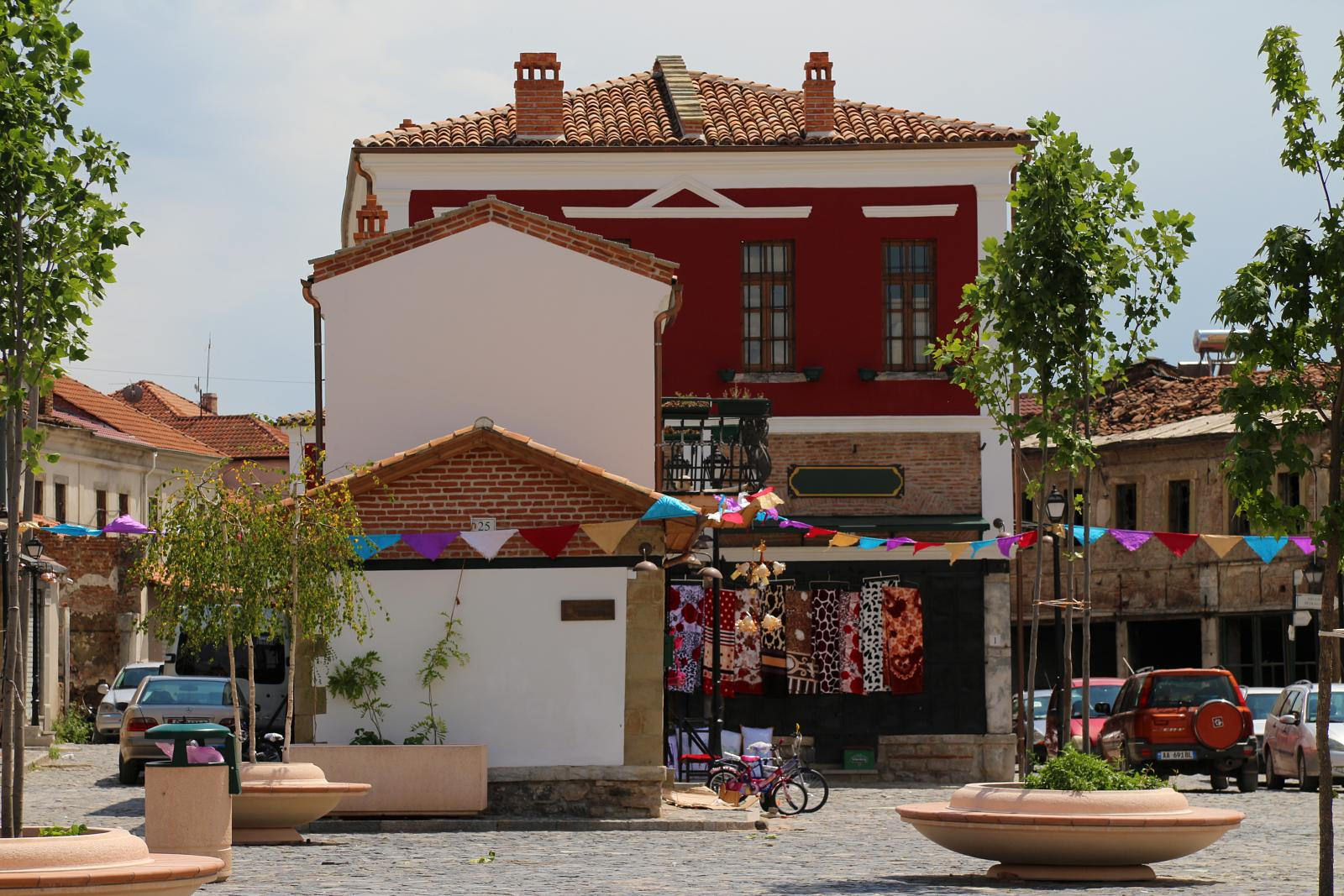
The Old Bazaar of Korçë was mostly rebuilt in 1879.

The rule of the Ottoman Empire over Korçë lasted until 1912 when Albania declared its independence. The city and its surroundings were supposed to become part of the Principality of Bulgaria, according to the Treaty of San Stefano in 1878, while the Treaty of Berlin of the same year returned the area to Ottoman rule. In 1910, the Church Alliance of local Orthodox Albanians led to the proclamation of an Albanian church by Mihal Grameno, but this effort was too isolated to affect the population. The armed Albanian bands, or çeta groups, of Sali Butka, Spiro Bellkameni and Kajo Babjeni briefly liberated Korçë from the Ottomans in August 1912.

Korçë's proximity to Greece, which claimed the entire Orthodox population as Greek, led to its being fiercely contested in the Balkan Wars of 1912–1913. Greek forces captured Korçë from the Ottomans on 6 December 1912 and afterwards proceeded to imprison the Albanian nationalists of the town.

Its incorporation into Albania in 1913 was disputed by Greece, who claimed it as part of the region called Northern Epirus, and resulted in a rebellion by the Greek population residing in the region of Korçë, who asked the intervention of the Greek army. This rebellion was initially suppressed by the Dutch commanders of the Albanian gendarmerie, that consisted of 100 Albanians led by the Orthodox Albanian nationalist Themistokli Gërmenji, and as a result the local Greek-Orthodox bishop Germanos and other members of the town council were arrested and expelled by the Dutch.

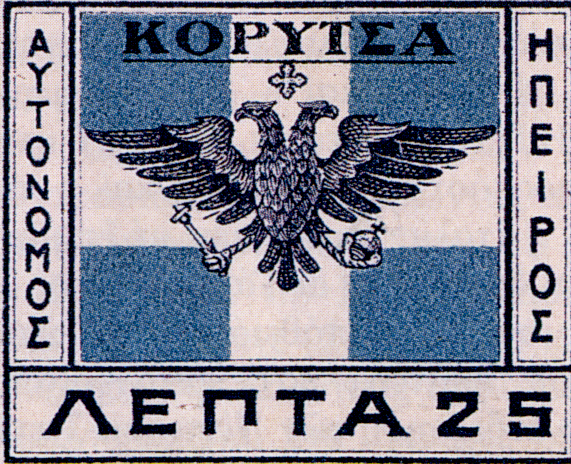
Flag of the Autonomous Albanian Republic of Korçë from 1916 to 1920 (left). Flag of the Autonomous Republic of Northern Epirus on a postage stamp issued in Korçë at 1914 (right).

Under the terms of the Protocol of Corfu (May 1914), the city became part of the Autonomous Republic of Northern Epirus inside the borders of the principality of Albania, but on 10 July 1914 the Greek Northern Epirote forces took over the city. Under Greek occupation, for the purpose of convincing the Congress of London of Greek expansionist claims, the Greek authorities took a census, which counted 15,453 inhabitants in the city, of which 11,453 were designated as "Greeks" and the rest 4,000 as "Albanians", however, the census did not inquire about ethnicity, but rather instead explicitly had all Christians renamed "Greeks" and all Muslims changed to "Albanians", by religious criteria alone.

At the time, even ethnographers sympathetic to the Greek claims considered the city Albanian. Since the passes over the Pindus mountain range were much difficult, the Greeks wished to retain this city after the 1914 occupation of parts of southern Albania because only Korçë granted the successful maintenance of communications by land between the territories of Epirus and Macedonia that were acquired by Greece in 1913.

=== 20th century ===
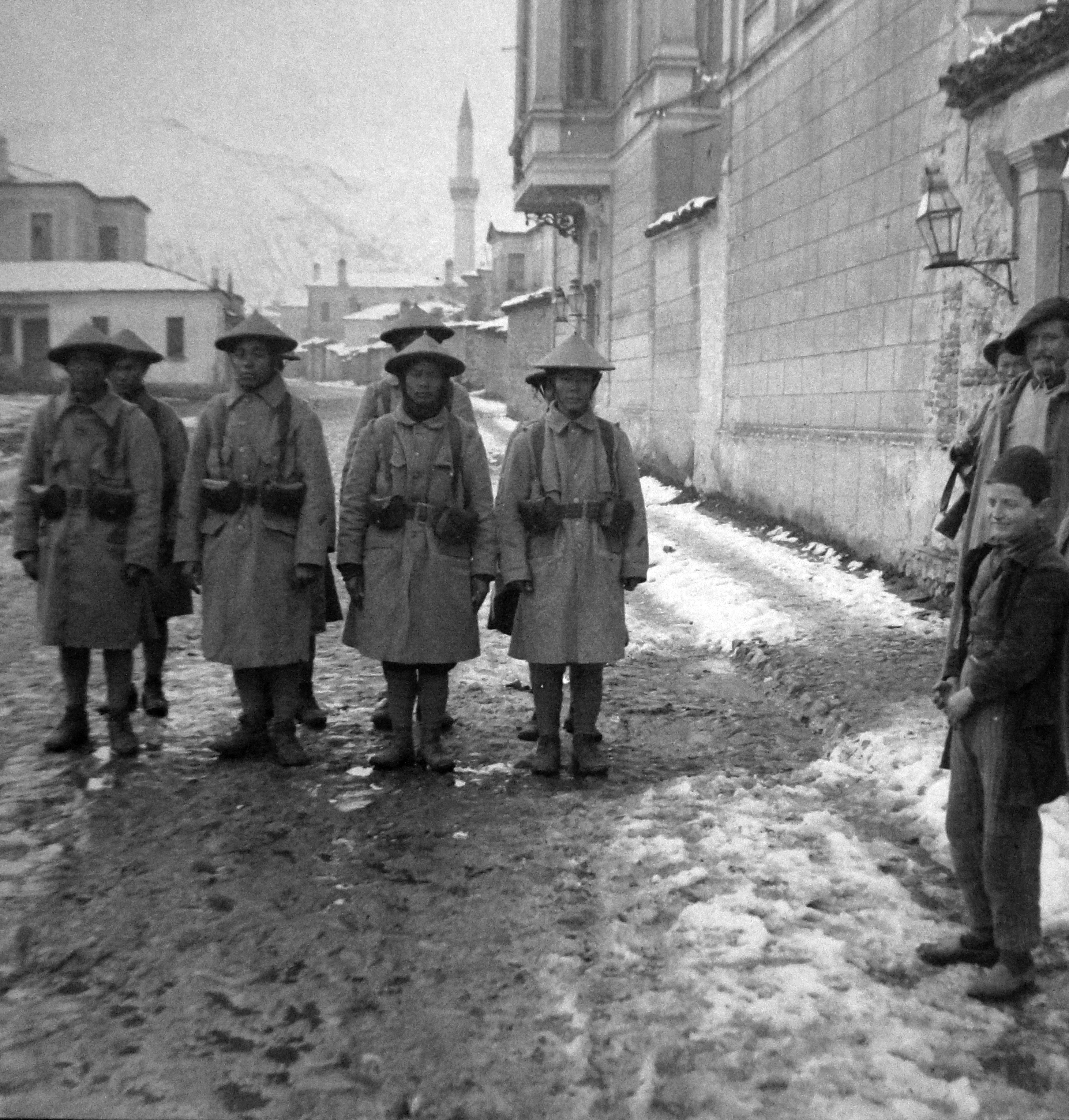
Tonkinese (Vietnamese) Tirailleurs in Korçë, January 1917 during World War I

In October 1914 the city came again under Greek administration. During the period of the National Schism (1916) in Greece, a local revolt broke out, and with military and local support Korçë came under the control of Eleftherios Venizelos' Movement of National Defence, overthrowing the royalist forces. However, due to developments in the Macedonian Front of World War I the city came soon under French control (1916–1920).

The French initially awarded control of Korçë and the surrounding area to Greek allies, but Albanian çeta guerilla bands led by Themistokli Gërmenji and Sali Butka fought against Venizelist forces for Albanian self-administration. In response to the French administration supporting the Greek demands of Eleftherios Venizelos for the partition of southern Albania, Sali Butka - accompanied by Themistokli Gërmenji's small armed band - led 1,500 men towards Korçë and surrounded the city. Sali Butka's Albanian band burned Moscopole in response to the pro-Greek behaviour of the French administration, and threatened that Korçë would share the same fate. Meanwhile, the Venizelos Movement of National Defence was unable to dispatch reinforcements to the region, and French General Maurice Sarrail demanded the withdrawal of the local Greek garrison.

While Gërmenji negotiated with the French in the city, Butka continued the encirclement; eventually, Butka and the Albanians sent their demands to the French, which ultimately culminated in the creation of the Autonomous Province of Korçë. After coming to the conclusion that the local Albanians thoroughly disliked the Greek administration of the area, on 8 December 1916, Sarrail cabled that French military policy should change to support the Albanian nationalist uprising; by converting the Albanian uprising to the Allied cause, Sarrail hoped to protect his left flank and enable it to join up with the Italians in Vlorë and discourage the Austrians from trying to advance through Albania. Furthermore, a peaceful and stable allied Korçë under French influence would reduce the number of troops the French army needed to commit to hold the area.

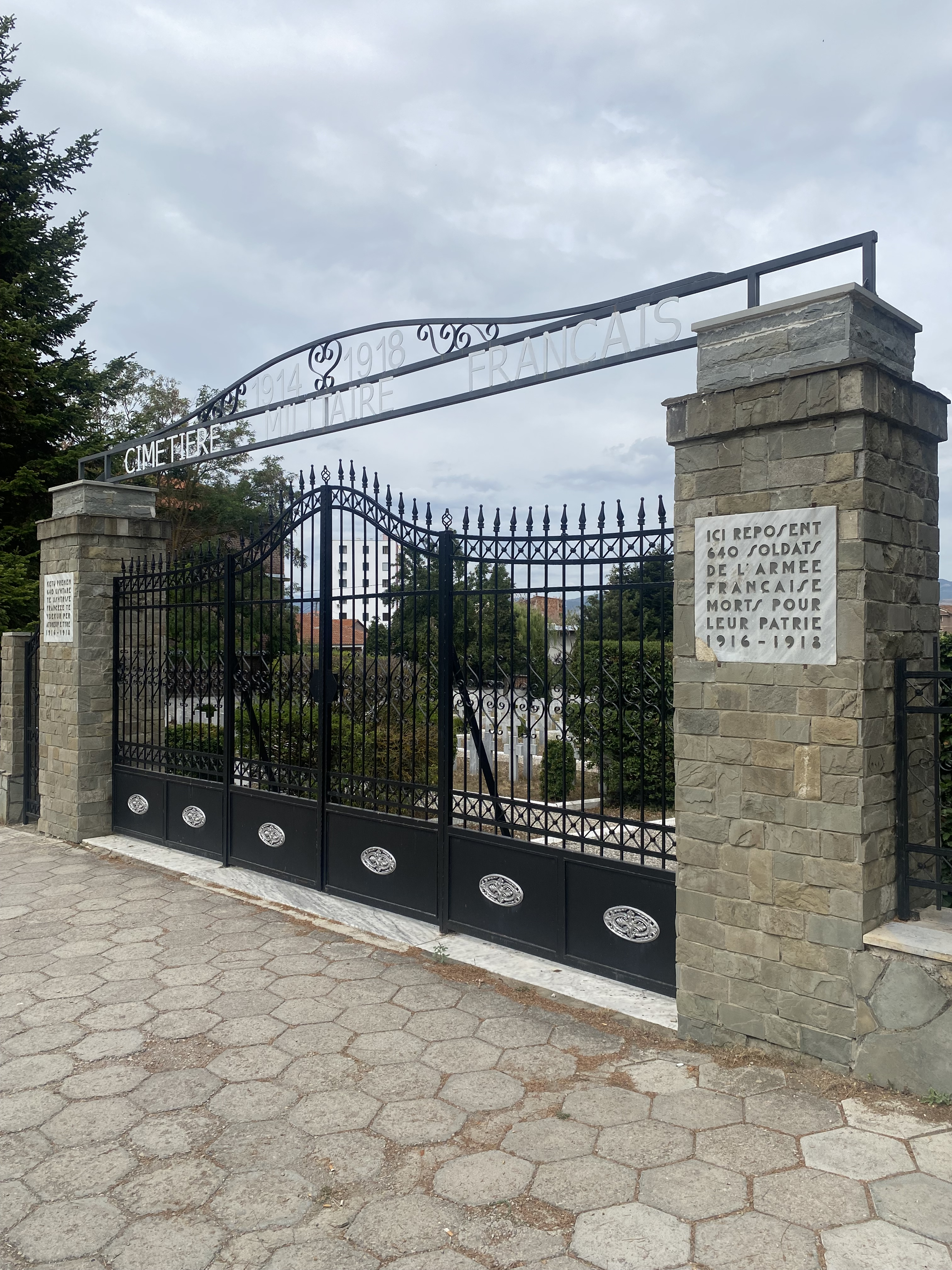
French military cemetery

On the 10th of December 1916, fourteen Albanian delegates, including seven Muslims and seven Christians, proclaimed the Autonomous Albanian Republic of Korçë. The French agreed to these demands and the fourteen representatives of Korçë and Colonel Descoins signed a protocol that proclaimed the Autonomous Albanian Republic of Korçë under the military protection of the French army and with Themistokli Gërmenji as president. The French pursued policies which strengthened expressions of Albanian nationalism. Greek schools were closed down, Greek clergy and pro-Greek notables expelled while allowing Albanian education and promoting Albanian self-government through the autonomous Korçë republic, although Greek schools were reopened after a year and two months in February 1918. Another factor that reinforced Albanian sentiments among the population was the return of 20–30,000 Orthodox Albanian emigrants mainly to Korçë and the surrounding region who had attained Albanian nationalist sentiments abroad. The change in French policy to support the Albanians did create some tensions between France and Italy; the French assured the Italians that they did not have any territorial claims on either Korçë; General Sarrail's reports insisted that the local Albanians had proclaimed the republic, then asked for it to be put under French protection, and that Descoins had merely complied with the wishes of the local population.

On 16 February 1918, Sarrail's successor officially abrogated the proclamation, and following the re-entry of Greece into the war, made concessions to Greek interests including the reopening of Greek schools, but the Albanians were assured that this did not threaten their independence. The Autonomous Albanian Republic of Korçë remained a reality on the ground, continuing to rule its territory and fly its flag, while inter-religious cooperation was also maintained with both Muslims and Christians being grateful to the French for allowing them to continue their self-governance without much interference.

The Autonomous Republic of Korçë was greatly important for the Albanian nationalist movement, as it demonstrated to the world a resurgence in power for Albanian nationalism in one of the areas where it had been the strongest before the war, and it also demonstrated the successful cooperation of Albanian Christians and Muslims in governance. The government is considered to have been a successful experiment in Albanian self-administration, as the French allowed the entity to "act as if it were an independent state", minting its own coinage, introducing its own flag, and printing its own stamps. According to Stickney, the republic gave Albanians the opportunity for self-government under the light tutelage of the French, and they were able to build a state in the absence of the great power rivalry that had beset King Wilhelm's earlier government. However, this French initiative of Albanian self-rule ended without success and the head of this Republic was shot on the accusations of being an Austrian spy. It later became clear that the military tribunal had made a grave judicial error, its members having been led astray by Greek informers who wished Gërmenji removed since he was a powerful Albanian leader. The severity of this decision seems to indicate that the French military authorities favored the movement of Eleftherios Venizelos and their Greek allies who entered the war alongside the Entente on 12 June 1917, and were against the Albanian national movement led by Gërmenji.

In response to the French turning on the Albanians and the subsequent execution of Themistokli Gërmenji, Sali Butka gathered a force of 20,000 Albanians and surrounded Korçë yet again. He sent the French forces an ultimatum, and Korçë was once again handed over to the Albanians rather than the Greeks, as the French wanted to place Korçë under Greek administration. The Conference of ambassadors, considering Albania's claims to the area, commissioned a League of Nations report consisting of three on the ground commissioners in December 1921. One commissioner, Finnish professor Jakob Sederholm noted in 1922 that Korçë's population was "entirely Albanian; the numbers of Greeks being insignificant" and continued that "there are, however, amongst the population two parties, — one nationalist and the other Grecophile" Sederholm also stated that the Orthodox inhabitants of Korçë abstained from the elections, and criticized the Albanian government for drawing electoral districts in such a way so as to practically disenfranchise the Christian inhabitants. It ultimately remained part of Albania, as determined by the International Boundary Commission, which affirmed the country's 1913 borders. Although assurances were given in the Paris Peace Conference by Albanian officials for the recognition of the Greek minority, Greek speech was prohibited in local education, religious life and in private within Korçë in the 1920s. At November 1921 the Albanian authorities expelled the Greek Orthodox metropolitan bishop Jakob. This event triggered demonstrations by the Orthodox community of the city. Immigration quotas during 1922-4 restricted former migrants returning to the United States and Korçë residents instead migrated to Australia to Moora, Western Australia and Shepperton, Victoria working in farming and agriculture related employment.

==== Communist Albania ====
Italian forces occupied Korçë in 1939, along with the rest of the country. During the Greco-Italian War it became the main forward base of the Italian air force. Nevertheless, the city came under the control of the advancing Greek forces, on 22 November 1940, during the first phase of the Greek counter-offensive. Korçë remained under Greek control until the German invasion of Greece in April 1941. After Italy's withdrawal from the war in 1943, the Germans occupied the town until 24 October 1944.

During the occupation, the city became a major centre of Communist-led resistance to the Axis occupation of Albania. The establishment of the Albanian Party of Labour—the Communist Party—was formally proclaimed in Korçë in 1941. Albanian rule was restored in 1944 following the withdrawal of German forces.

Right after World War II many people fled to Boston, United States joining a community of the Albanian-Americans, who had previously emigrated there.

After 1990 Korçë was one of the six cities where the New Democratic Party won all the constituencies. Popular revolts in February 1991 ended with the tearing down of Hoxha's statue.

==== Post-communist Albania ====
After the fall of communism, the city fell into disregard in many aspects. However following the 2000s, the city experienced a makeover as main streets and alleys started to be reconstructed, locals began to renovate their historic villas, a calendar of events was introduced, building façades painted, and city parks reinvigorated. The European Union is financing the renovation of the Korça Old Bazaar while the city centre was redesigned, and a watch tower constructed.

== Geography ==
Korçë lies mostly between latitudes 40° and 36° N and longitudes 20° and 46° E. The municipality of Korçë is encompassed in the County of Korçë within the Southern Region of Albania and consists of the adjacent administrative units of Drenovë, Lekas, Mollaj, Qendër Bulgarec, Vithkuq, Voskop, Voskopojë and Korçë as its seat.

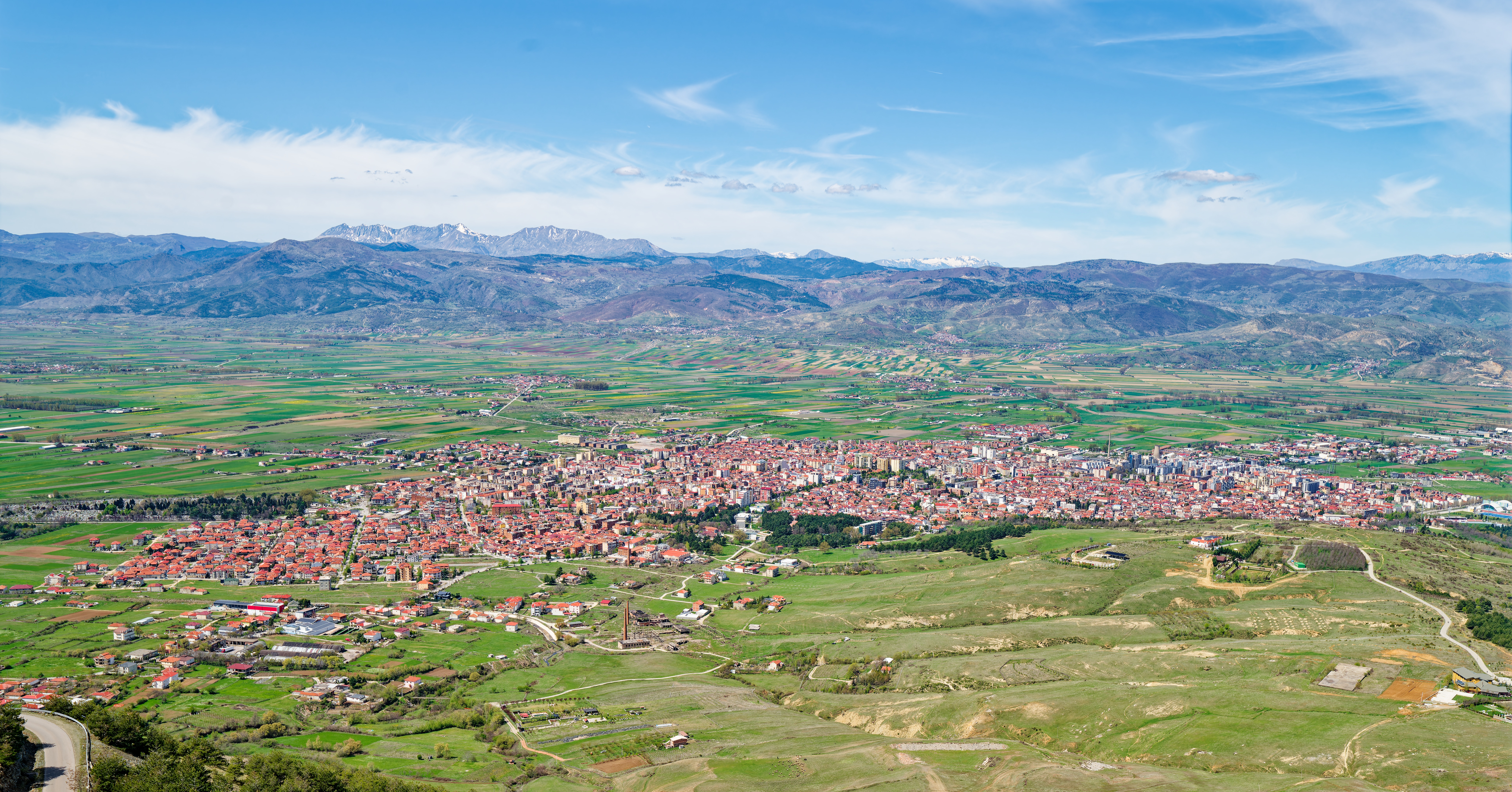
Panorama of Korçë seen from Kryqi Moravë

=== Climate ===
As of the Köppen climate classification, Korçë falls under the periphery of the warm-summer Mediterranean climate (Csb, bordering on Dsb) zone with an average annual temperature of 10.4 °C (50.7 °F). The warmest month of Korçë is August with an average temperature of 21.3 °C (70.3 °F). By contrast, the coldest month is January with an average temperature of −0.8 °C (30.6 °F). Korçë receives around 766.7 mm (30.19 in) annual precipitation with summer minimum and winter maximum. Temperatures generally remain cooler than western Albania, due to the middle altitude of the plain in which it is situated, but it receives about 2800 hours of solar radiation per year.

Climate data for Korçë (1961-1990)
Month	Jan	Feb	Mar	Apr	May	Jun	Jul	Aug	Sep	Oct	Nov	Dec	Year
Record high °C (°F)	17.4 (63.3)	18.4 (65.1)	21.8 (71.2)	26.7 (80.1)	31.6 (88.9)	34.3 (93.7)	38.7 (101.7)	36.5 (97.7)	33.1 (91.6)	29.1 (84.4)	22.1 (71.8)	18.1 (64.6)	38.7 (101.7)
Mean daily maximum °C (°F)	4.3 (39.7)	6.0 (42.8)	9.7 (49.5)	14.4 (57.9)	19.6 (67.3)	23.5 (74.3)	26.5 (79.7)	26.4 (79.5)	22.7 (72.9)	16.7 (62.1)	11.1 (52.0)	6.0 (42.8)	15.6 (60.0)
Daily mean °C (°F)	0.4 (32.7)	1.9 (35.4)	6.0 (42.8)	9.3 (48.7)	14.0 (57.2)	17.4 (63.3)	19.9 (67.8)	19.9 (67.8)	16.5 (61.7)	11.4 (52.5)	6.6 (43.9)	2.2 (36.0)	10.5 (50.8)
Mean daily minimum °C (°F)	−3.5 (25.7)	−2.3 (27.9)	2.3 (36.1)	4.2 (39.6)	8.3 (46.9)	11.3 (52.3)	13.3 (55.9)	13.3 (55.9)	10.3 (50.5)	6.0 (42.8)	2.0 (35.6)	−1.7 (28.9)	5.3 (41.5)
Record low °C (°F)	−20.9 (−5.6)	−16.7 (1.9)	−16.5 (2.3)	−3.6 (25.5)	0.0 (32.0)	4.0 (39.2)	5.3 (41.5)	4.9 (40.8)	−0.5 (31.1)	−7.4 (18.7)	−10.2 (13.6)	−19.0 (−2.2)	−20.9 (−5.6)
Average precipitation mm (inches)	87.5 (3.44)	80.6 (3.17)	84.4 (3.32)	73.2 (2.88)	102.1 (4.02)	79.2 (3.12)	33.0 (1.30)	33.7 (1.33)	78.7 (3.10)	96.9 (3.81)	137.6 (5.42)	101.6 (4.00)	988.5 (38.91)
Average precipitation days (≥ 1.0 mm)	8.3	8.7	9.7	7.3	10.0	6.6	3.7	3.8	5.4	6.6	9.1	8.7	88.0
Source: NOAA (precipitation 1973-2023)

== Politics ==
Korçë is a municipality governed by a mayor–council government system with the mayor of Korçë and the members of the Korçë Municipal Council authorized for the administration of Korçë Municipality. Korçë is home to two foreign consulates; Greek and Romanian.

=== International relations ===
Korçë is twinned with:

- Los Alcázares, Spain
- Cluj-Napoca, Romania
- Mitrovica, Kosovo
- Thessaloniki, Greece

Korçë also cooperates with:

- Verona, Italy
- Wolfsberg, Austria

=== Municipal Council ===
Seat distribution in the Municipal Council

Following the 2023 local elections, the composition of the Council of Korçë is as follows:

Name	Abbr.	Seats
Socialist Party of Albania; Partia Socialiste e Shqipërisë	PS	23
Together We Win; Bashkë Fitojmë	BF	9
Democratic Party of Albania; Partia Demokratike e Shqipërisë	PD	2
Environmentalist Agrarian Party; Partia Agrare Ambientaliste	AAP	2
Party for Justice, Integration and Unity; Partia Drejtësi, Integrim dhe Unitet	PDIU	1
Hashtag Initiative; Nisma Thurje	NTH	1
National Labor Alliance; Aleanca Kombëtare e Punës	AKP	1
Social Democratic Party of Albania; Partia Socialdemokrate e Shqipërisë	PDS	1
Republican Party of Albania; Partia Republikane e Shqipërisë	PR	1
Lazjon Petri; Independent		1

== Economy ==
During the Stalinist rule of Enver Hoxha, Korçë gained a substantial industrial capacity in addition to its historic role as a commercial and agricultural centre. Local industries include the manufacture of knitwear, rugs, textiles, flour-milling, brewing, and sugar-refining. The city is home to the nationally famous Birra Korça.

According to official reports the city enjoys one of the lowest unemployment rates in the country. The majority of foreign investment comes from Greek, as well as joint Albanian-Greek enterprises.

== Infrastructure ==
=== Education ===
The city is home to Fan Noli University, founded in 1971, which offers several degrees in the humanities, sciences and business. The university includes a school in Agriculture, Teaching, Business, Nursing, and Tourism.

With the prohibition of Greek education in the city, at c. 1922, there was a constant demand for the reopening a Greek school. After the collapse of the Socialist Republic, part of the local communities expressed a growing need to revive their cultural past, in particular with the reopening of Greek language institutions. In April 2005 the first bilingual Greek-Albanian school opened in Korçë after 60 years of prohibition of Greek education. In addition, a total of 17 Greek language tutoring centres function in the city. Students of the local Greek minority attend either private Greek institutions or Albanian public schools.

In 2009, a madrassa (Islamic highschool) was built in Korçë and is operated by the Muslim Community of Albania.

== Demographics ==
Historical population
Year	Pop.	±%
1950	25,831	—
1960	39,363	+52.4%
1969	45,100	+14.6%
1979	52,800	+17.1%
1989	63,623	+20.5%
2001	55,017	−13.5%
2011	51,152	−7.0%
2023	43,254	−15.4%

Korçë is the 7th populous city in Albania and the largest city in the Korçë County. In 2007, the population of the city was about 86,176 inhabitants. According to the Institute of Statistics (INSTAT), the city of Korçë include 51,683 (25,478 male; 26,205 female) people as of the 2011 Census. The city of Korçë was one of the major centres of the Greek minority in southern Albania, the other being Gjirokastër. A Greek minority is still found in Korçë.

Aromanians of Korçë live mainly in one neighborhood of the city where they speak Aromanian, have Aromanian cultural associations that are divided between pro-Romanian and pro-Greek factions, receive church liturgy in Aromanian and maintain cultural and economic connections to Romania and Greece.

Romani also inhabit the city, in particular the Kulla e Hirit neighborhood and their presence in the city mainly dates to the early 20th century when they migrated from Turkey to Florina and ultimately Korçë.

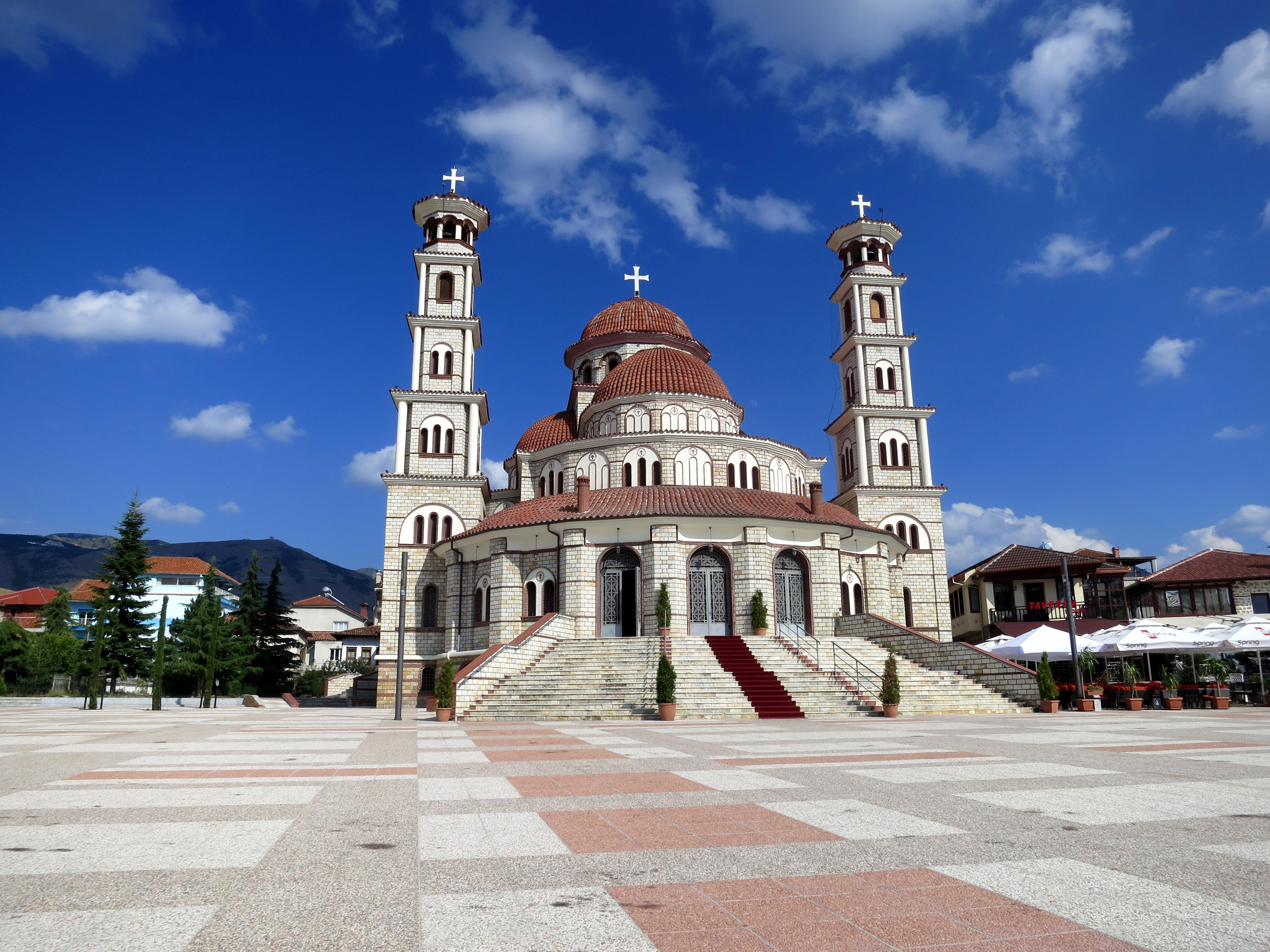
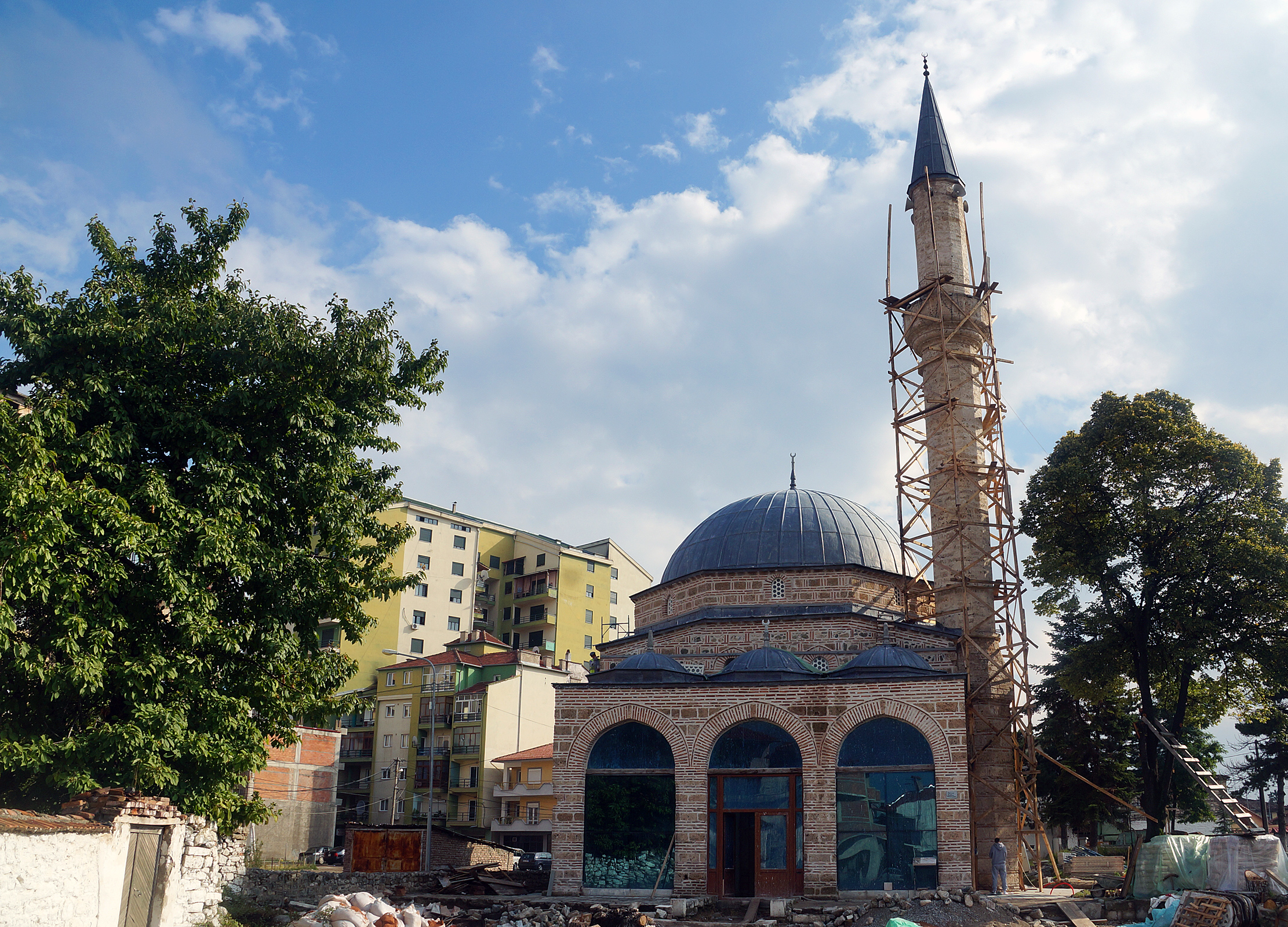
Resurrection Cathedral of Korçë is the main church of the city (left). The Mirahori Mosque was built in 1494 (right).

For centuries Korçë has been an important religious centre for both Orthodox Christians and Muslims, hosting a significant Orthodox community as well as significant Sunni and Bektashi communities in and around the city. The main centre of the Bektashis of the area is the Turan Takya. In modern days, there are also smaller numbers of Catholics and Protestants in the city, as well the irreligious. The second Albanian Protestant church was opened in Korçë. In 1940, Korçë's Evangelical Church was closed down by the Italian fascist forces.

Even before the foundation of the modern town, the Korçë district was initially part of the Metropolis of Kastoria (15th century), but in the early 17th century became the seat of an Orthodox bishop and in 1670 was elevated to metropolitan bishopric. The city remained entirely Christian until the first half of the 16th century. The Orthodox Cathedral of Saint George, a significant landmark in the city, was demolished by the authorities of the People's Republic of Albania during the atheistic campaign. The St. Sotir Church serves the Aromanian community of Korçë. It was built from 1995 to 2005. The church had already existed in the early 20th century, having been completed in 1925, but it was demolished by the Albanian communist authorities in 1959.

Islam entered the city in the 15th century through Iljaz Hoxha, an Albanian janissary, who actively participated in the Fall of Constantinople. One of the oldest mosques in Albania was built by Iljaz Hoxha in 1484, the Iliaz Mirahori Mosque. The Romani population of Korçë consists of Muslims, who in the 1920s maintained their own mosques in the city, while there are also Orthodox Christian Roma in the city's Varosh neighbourhood.

== Culture ==
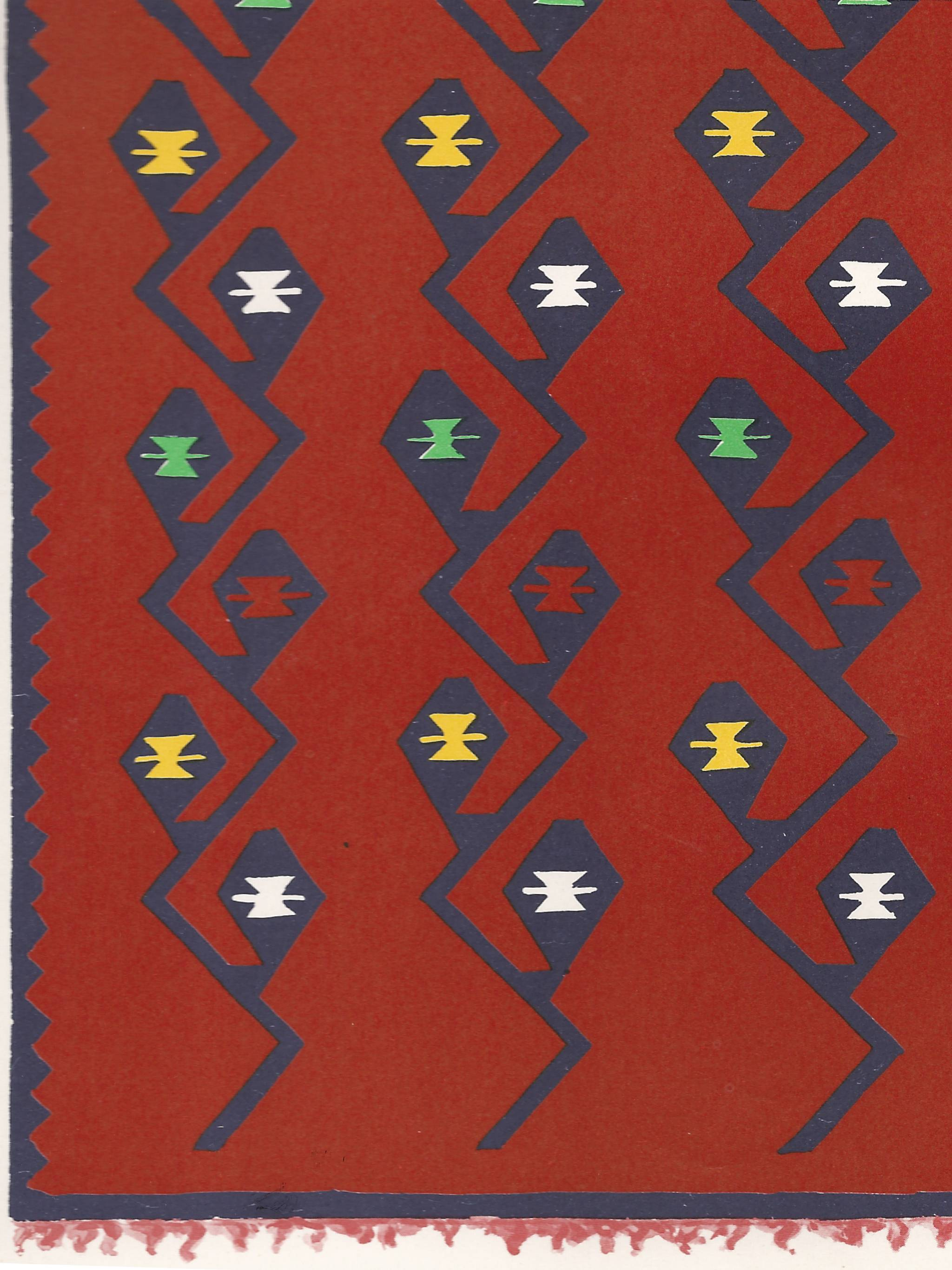
A shaggy carpet with hook designs from Korçë, 1970

Korçë is known as southern Albania's intellectual capital and is also regarded as the Albanian cultural metropolis. The city and its surrounding area are culturally distinct of all the regions in the Albanian ethnographic regions and maintain a rich variety of traditional and urban music.

Korçë being one of the important cultural and economic centers in the country is known for its low houses and villas, paved with cobblestone. It is the home of the largest carnival in Albania that takes place before Orthodox Easter, a tradition dating back 40 years. Musically, the city is known for the local songs, called serenata. Organised by the Korçë municipality, the annual summer Lakror Festival (Albanian: Festa e Lakrorit) celebrating Lakror, the regional Albanian pie is held in Korçë or sometimes in a village of the wider area which is attended by locals and tourists.

The city is the birthplace of Albania's first women to work as professional painters, Androniqi Zengo Antoniu and Sofia Zengo Papadhimitri, whose father Vangjel Zengo was a notable icon painter.

Historically, Korçë is known as an origin for handmade rugs with its unique motifs and symbols.

=== Museums ===
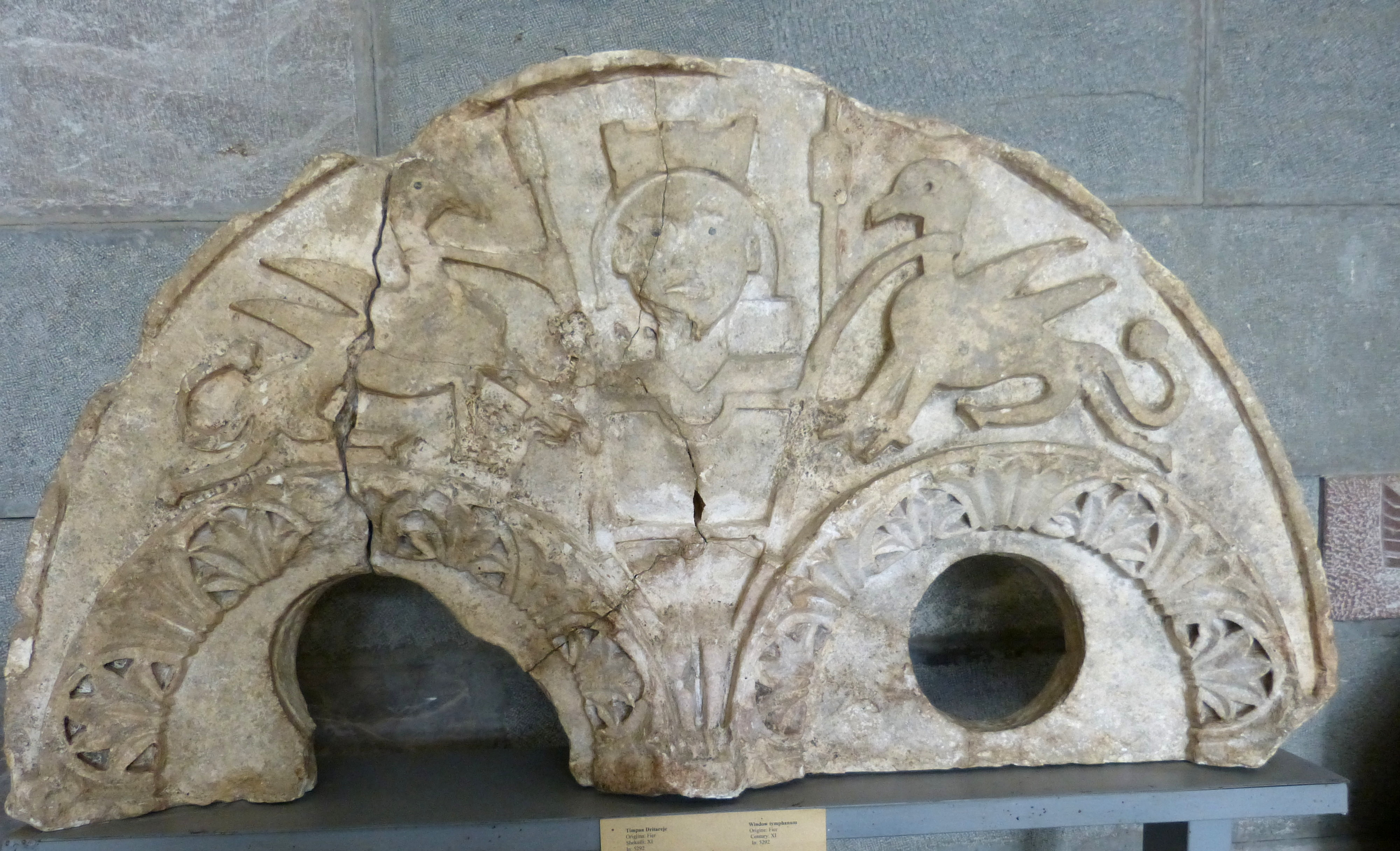
Bifora with a relief of the aerial flight of Alexander the Great, National Museum of Medieval Art

Korçë is referred to as the city of museums. The city hosts two major museums such as the National Museum of Medieval Art and National Museum of Archeology. The National Museum of Medieval Art has rich archives of about 7000 icons and 500 other objects in textile, stone and metal. The first Albanian School as well as the residence and gallery of painter Vangjush Mio function as museums. The Bratko Museum and the Oriental Museum are also located in the city.

Korçë has a city theatre, the Andon Zako Çajupi Theatre, which started its shows in 1950 and has been working uninterruptedly since.

=== Sport ===
One of Korçë's most popular sports is football. Its most popular soccer club is Skënderbeu Korçë and was formed on 15 April 1909 under the name Vllazëria by politician and poet Hilë Mosi. They were Albanian Champions in 1933 and recently, in 2011, 2012, 2013, 2014, 2015 and 2016 and 2018. In 2015 the club became the first Albanian side to reach the play-off round of the UEFA Champions League but they lost to Dinamo Zagreb and dropped into the UEFA Europa League, and became the first Albanian club to qualify for the group stage of European competition.

== See also ==
- List of mayors of Korçë
- People from Korçë

== Sources ==
- Caka, Eduart (2017). "Të dhëna mbi disa vakëfe kryesore të qytetit të Korçës gjatë periudhës osmane (shek. XVI-XIX)" [Data on some main waqfs of the town of Korça during Ottoman period (16th -19th cent.)]. Studime Historike (in Albanian). 1–2. Tirana: Instituti i Historisë i Qendrës së Studimeve Albanologjike: 83–99.
- De Rapper, Gilles (2012). "The Vakëf: Sharing religious space in Albania". In Albera, Dionigi; Couroucli, Maria (eds.). Sharing Sacred Spaces in the Mediterranean: Christians, Muslims, and Jews at Shrines and Sanctuaries. Indiana University Press. pp. 29–50. ISBN 9780253016904.
- Egro, Dritan (2010). "Islam in the Albanian lands (XVth-XVIIth Century)". In Schmitt, Oliver Jens (ed.). Religion und Kultur im albanischsprachigen Südosteuropa (1 ed.). Frankfurt am Main: Lang. pp. 13–52. ISBN 9783631602959.
- Esposito, John L. (2004). The Islamic World: Abbasid caliphate-Historians. Vol. 1. Oxford University Press. ISBN 9780195175929.
- Giakoumis, Konstantinos (2010). "The Orthodox Church in Albania under Ottoman Rule (15th-19th Century)". In Schmitt, Oliver Jens (ed.). Religion und Kultur im albanischsprachigen Südosteuropa (1 ed.). Frankfurt am Main: Lang. pp. 69–110. ISBN 9783631602959.
- Guy, Nicola C. (2005). "Fixing the Frontiers? Ethnography, Power Politics and the Delimitation of Albania, 1912 to 1914". Studies in Ethnicity and Nationalism. 5 (1): 27–49. doi:10.1111/j.1754-9469.2005.tb00126.x. ISSN 1754-9469.
- Kiel, Machiel (1990). Ottoman Architecture in Albania, 1385-1912. Islamic art series. Vol. 5. Research Centre for Islamic History, Art and Culture. ISBN 9290633301.
- Prifti, Rezart; Jaupi, Fatma (2020). Entrepreneurial Urban Regeneration: Business Improvement Districts as a Form of Organizational Innovation. Routledge Focus on Business and Management. Routledge. ISBN 978-1000221763.

Koço, Eno (5 February 2018). Traditional Songs and Music of the Korçë Region of Albania. Cambridge Scholars. ISBN 978-1-5275-0532-2. Archived from the original on 17 December 2021.

- Rembeci, Andi; Cunga, Sokol (2019). "Vithkuq of Moschopolis: the cradle of the early inhabitants of Kozani, according to oral tradition". In Hariton Karanasios; Vasiliki Diafa-Kampouridou (eds.). Η Κοζάνη και η περιοχή της από τους Βυζαντινούς στους Νεότερους Χρόνους [Kozani and its area from the Byzantines to the Modern Times]. Kozani: Εταιρεία Δυτικομακεδονικών Μελετών [Society for Western Macedonian Studies]. pp. 103–132.
- Wilkinson, H. R. (1951). Maps and Politics: A review of the Ethnographic Cartography of Macedonia. The University Press of Liverpool.
