= Resurrection Cathedral, Korçë =

Albanian Orthodox church in Korçë, Albania

Coordinates: 40.6158°N 20.7808°E

Resurrection of Christ Cathedral
- Katedralja “Ngjallja e Krishtit”
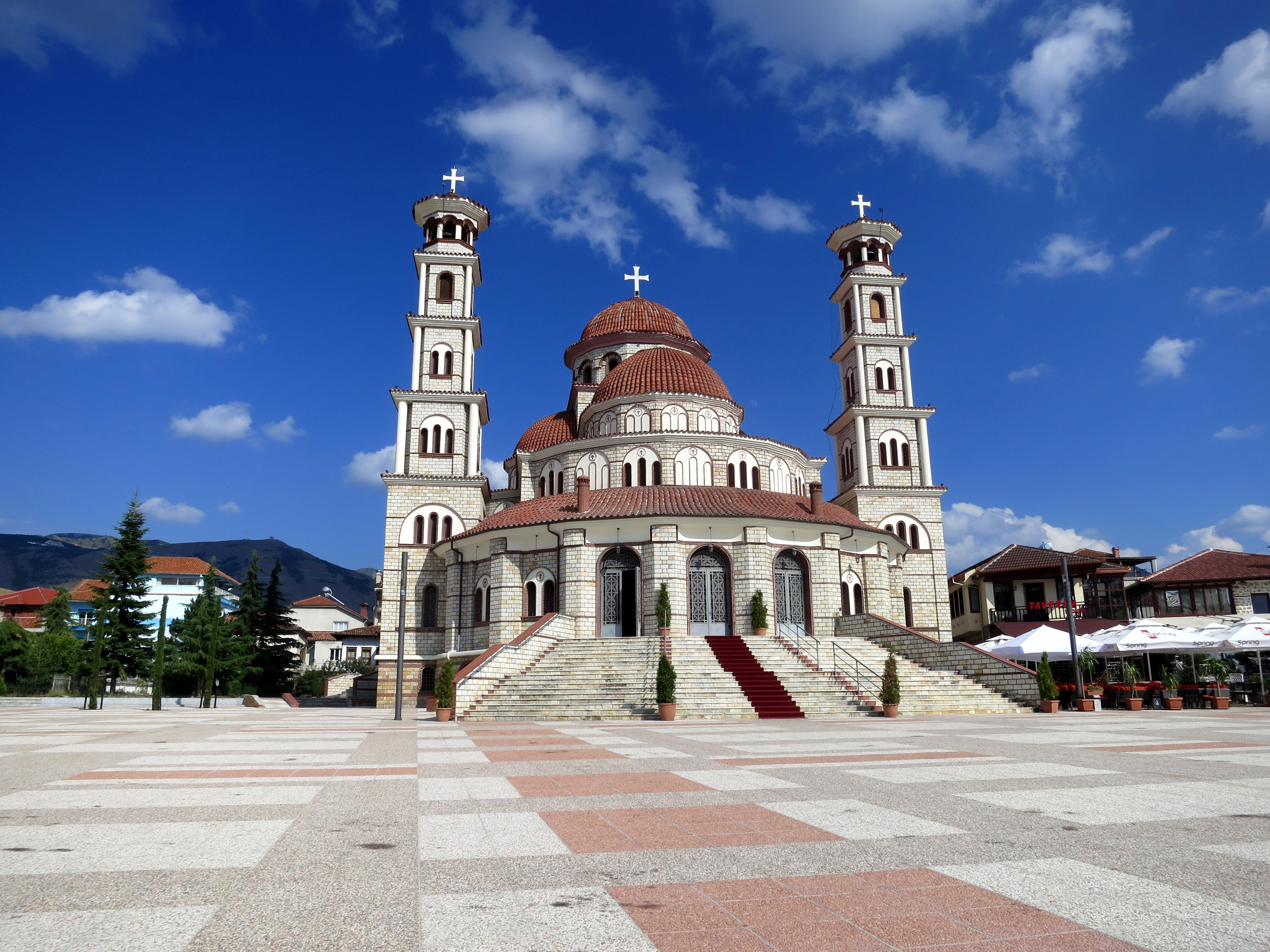
- Iconostasis and ceiling above the apse with frescoes
- Resurrection of Christ Cathedral
- Location: Korçë
- Country: Albania
- Denomination: Eastern Orthodox
- Sui iuris church: Albanian Orthodox Church

History
- Status: Cathedral
- Consecrated: 2002

Architecture
- Functional status: Active
- Architectural type: Church
- Groundbreaking: 1994
- Completed: 2002; 24 years ago

The Resurrection of Christ Cathedral of Korçë (Albanian: Katedralja “Ngjallja e Krishtit”) is the main Albanian Orthodox church in Korçë, Albania.

== History ==
A previous cathedral in Korçë named after St. George was destroyed by the Communist authorities in 1968.

It is painted in pink, blue and brown. Inside, the modest white interior is dominated by a huge carved wooden iconostasis.
