= Ioannis Pangas =

Greek merchant and philanthropist

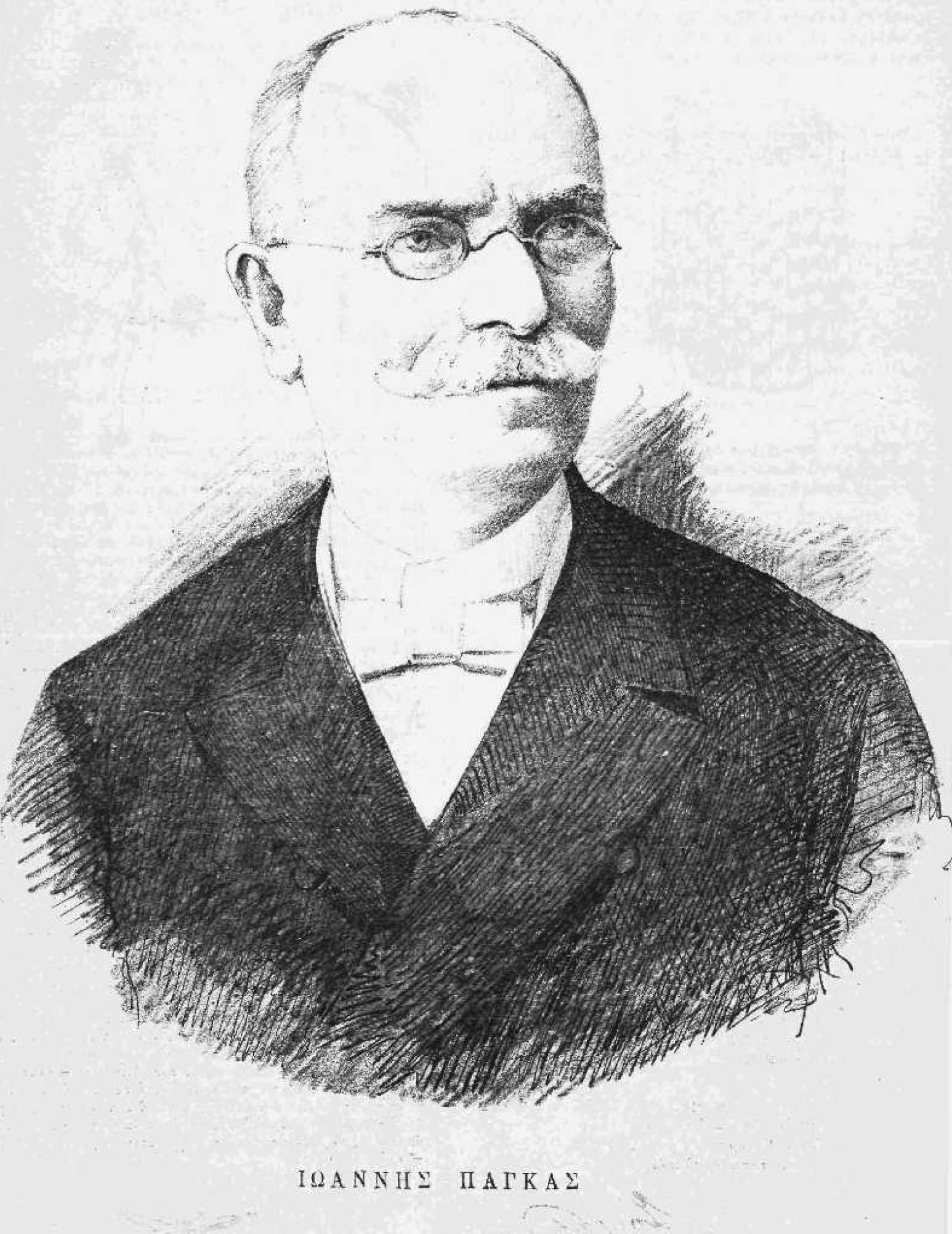
- Born: 1814; Korçë, Ottoman Empire
- Died: 1895 (aged 81); Athens, Greece
- Occupation: Businessman
- Known for: Benefactory deeds, Pangas Institute

Ioannis Pangas or Bangas (Greek: Ιωάννης Πάγκας, 1814–1895) was a aromanian merchant and philanthropist. He donated vast sums of money to the Greek state, as well as to educational, cultural and humanitarian institutions of the Greek communities in Greece and the Ottoman ruled Greek world.

== Life ==
He was born in a aromanian family in Korçë in Ottoman Empire (present-day southern Albania). Though his father Georgios Pangas was also a notable merchant and philanthropist, Ioannis Pangas made his own fortune. He initially moved to Thebes and then to Chalkis. At 1833 in order to expand his professional activities, he moved to Cairo (Egypt) and then Romania. At a mature age he settled in Athens. Because of his character and hard-working nature he managed to make a fortune.

== Benefactory deeds and legacy ==
In 1889, he donated a significant amount of money for the maintenance and expansion of the Greek schools in his home city Korçë, where he also established new libraries and donated a huge amount of educational material at his personal expense. Thus, he became one of the main contributors of the Lasso fund, a community fund that supported the foundation and support of Greek cultural institutions in Korçë. The Greek Gymnasium of his home town was named Bangas Gymnasium after him.

While living in Athens, he built a luxurious mansion, designed by the German architect Ernst Ziller, at the center of the Greek capital (on Omonoia square) as well as a second manor, also designed by Ziller, adjacent to his home. On 16 August 1889, Pangas donated to the Greek state his fortune and all of his possessions, as an act of philanthropy to aid the rebuilding of Athens and the growth of the new Greek state. He retained only 1,000 drachmas per month in order to lead a decent life. This form of benefaction was quite unusual, to offer to donate one's fortune while living rather than upon death. Greek prime minister Charilaos Trikoupis personally noted the significance of Pangas's philanthropy.

Pangas's mansion and adjacent manor still stand at Omonoia square. The former operated for many years as the Hotel Alexander the Great. The latter came to be known as the "Pangeion" or "Bangeion" or "Baggeion" (Greek: Μπάγκειον) and has been used to house universities and other educational institutions.

== Sources ==
- Epirus, 4000 years of Greek history and civilization. M. V. Sakellariou. Ekdotike Athenon, 1997. ISBN 960-213-371-6.
- His life and work.
- Hotel Alexander the Great.
- Baggeion.
- Epirot benefactors
