= Old Bazaar of Korçë =

Coordinates: 40°37′03″N 20°46′28″E

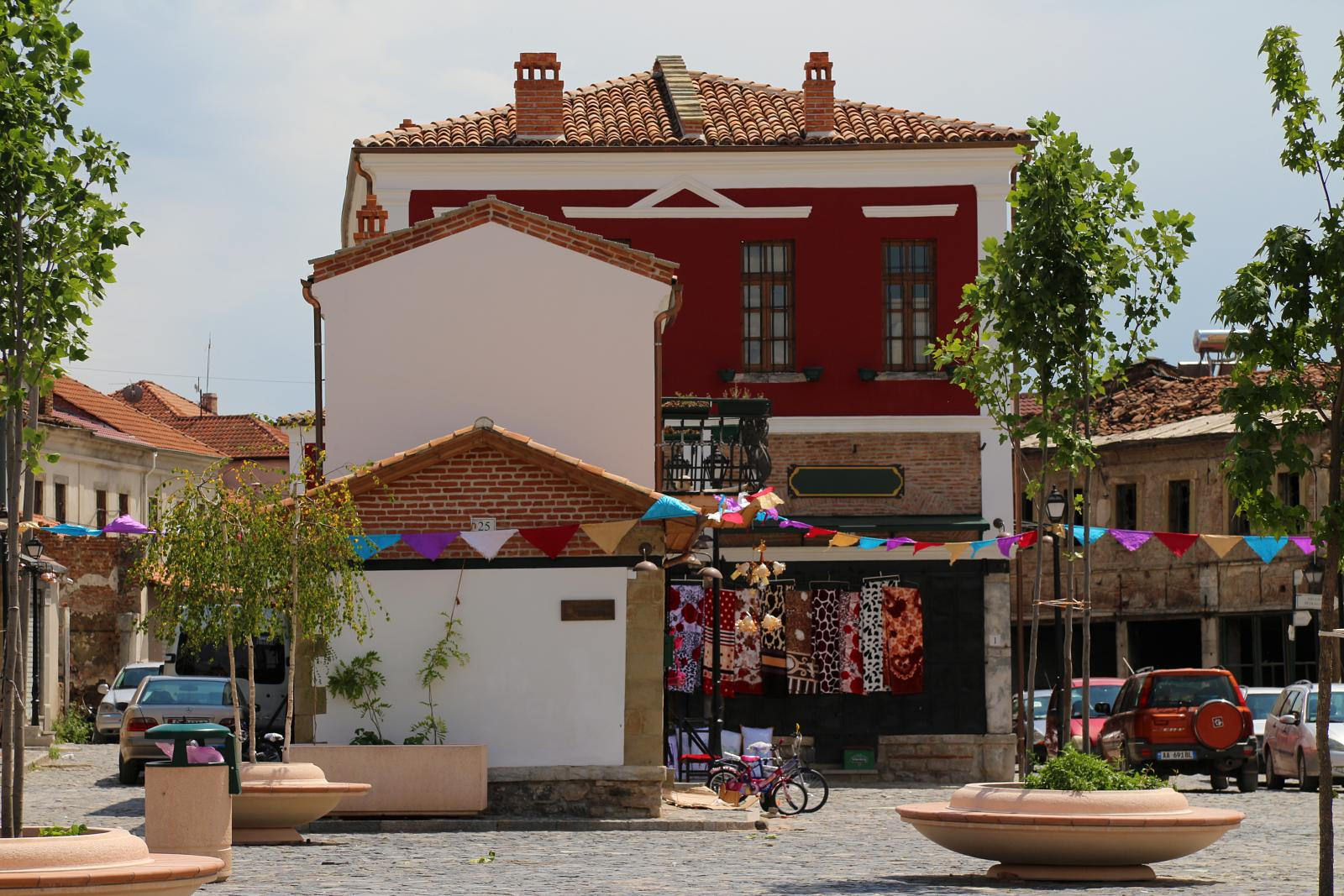
Street of the Old Bazaar

Old Bazaar of Korçë (Albanian: Pazari i Korçës) is an Ottoman-era bazaar in Korçë, Albania.

Established about 500 years ago, it is composed of old Ottoman and Roman architectonic style buildings which for centuries were used as shops, guesthouses or khans. It is said to be noted for selling goats and handbags.

It was mostly rebuilt in 1879 following an extensive fire.

The old bazaar comprises 138 first category culture monuments. It is also called as the Bazaar of the Serenades, associated with the music which for centuries was composed and sung by people whilst walking with a guitar on the round cobblestone.

== Renovation ==
In 2015 it was announced that the bazaar would be renovated and transformed into a hub for tourists visiting the city, due to a $4 million restoration project financed by the Albanian Development Fund and the Albanian American Fund for Development.
