= Iljaz bej Mirahori =

15th-century Ottoman Albanian Janissary

Iljaz Bej Mirahori
- Born: 1408; Panarit, Ottoman Empire (now Albania)
- Died: 1511 (aged 102–103); Korçë, Ottoman Empire (modern Albania)
- Citizenship: Ottoman-Albanian
- Occupations: Ottoman military commander, governor
- Known for: Service to Mehmed II, founder of Korçë and the Mirahor Mosque
- Relatives: His descendants are the Frashëri brothers, Abdul Frashëri, Naim Frashëri, Sami Frashëri and their mother Emine Hanim.

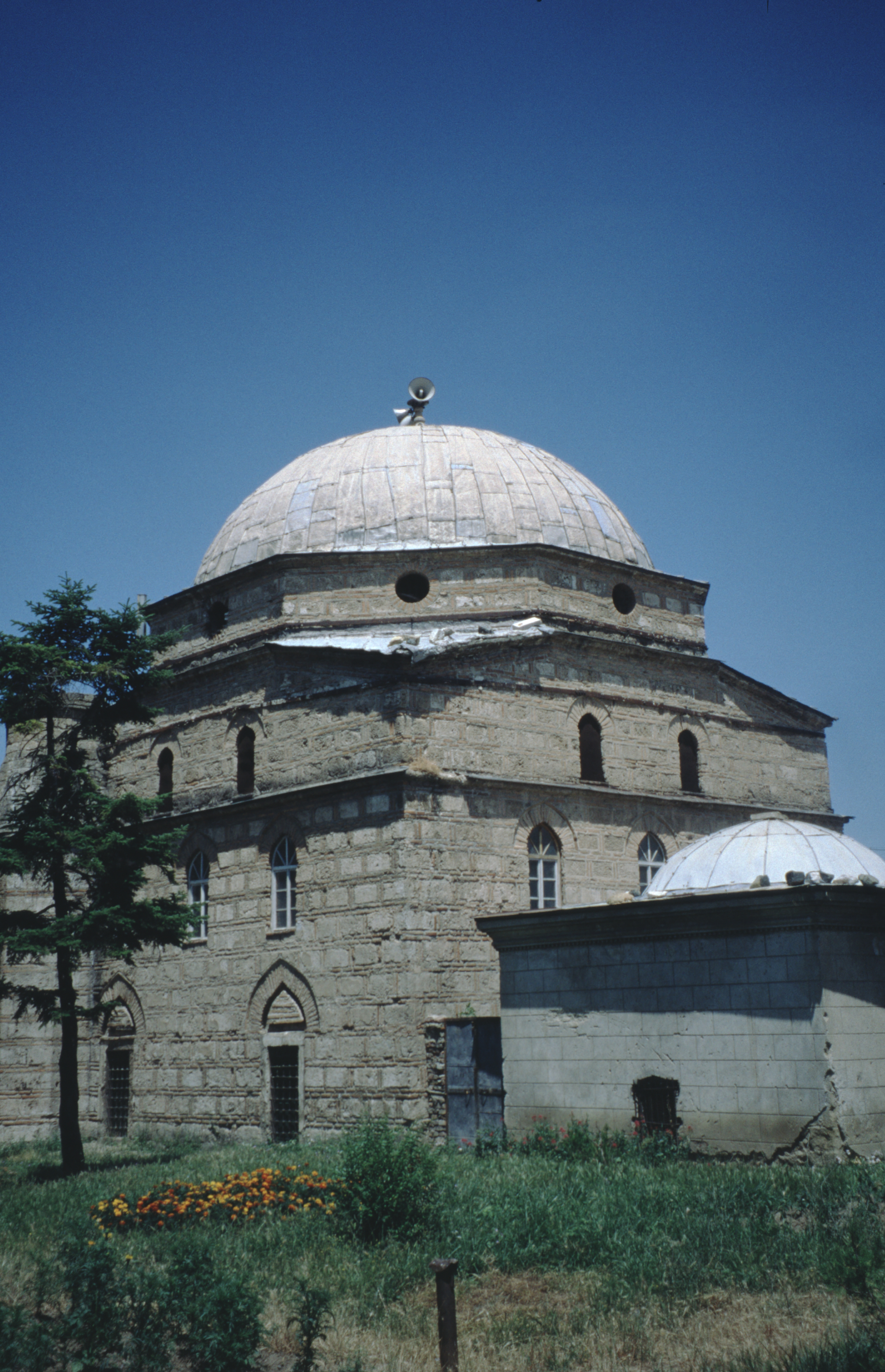
Tomb of Ilyas Bey (right) in the backyard of the Görice mosque in 1998

Iljaz Bej Mirahori (Turkish: İmrahor İlyas Bey; 1408–1511) was an Ottoman Albanian military commander and governor, who served sultan Bayezid II. He founded the town of Korçë in Albania in the 15th century, participated in the Conquest of Constantinople and built the Monastery of St John the Studite there as a mosque.

== Biography ==
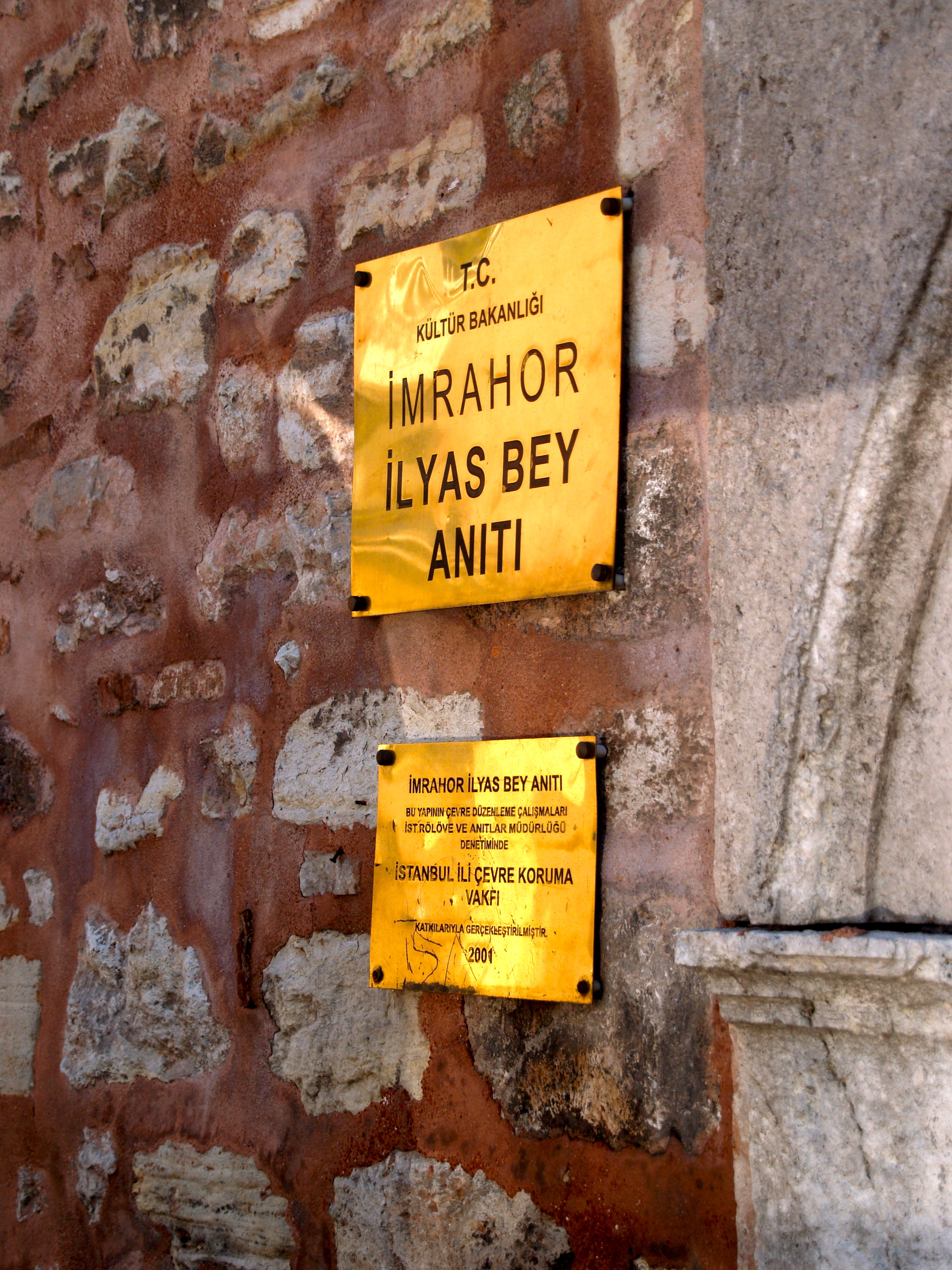
The Imrahor Mosque as monument in Istanbul

Iljaz was born in Panarit, Korçë District and entered janissary service probably during the reign of Murad II. He had three sons: Muhammed, Inebey and Sefershah.

He was one of the most loyal subjects of the young Ottoman emperor Mehmet II, and dedicated his life to the service of the Emperor against Skanderbeg and his forces. In the year 1453, Iljaz Hoxha's role in the Siege of Constantinople earned him the title Mirahor (General of Cavalry). Later he received the Mirahor Evel title (Head General). After the conquest, he became the sanjak-bey of Korçë (now in Albania). Under the command of Mehmet II he founded and developed Korçë as both a cultural center and garrison city. He constructed its first mosque, the Mirahori Mosque.

The Frashëri brothers Abdul (1839-1892), Naim (1846-1900) and Sami (1850-1904) were descendants of Iljaz Bej through their mother Emine who was from Korçë. Sami Frashëri in his publications wrote about his ancestor Iljaz Bej, in his Kamus al-Alam:

Iljaz Koca Mirahor is one of the people of Ebul Fetih Sultan Mehmed Khan II and Sultan Bayezid. He is the great-grandfather of the humble writer [i.e. Sami Frashëri] from his mother's side, and founder of the city of Korça, in the vilayet of Manastir. Iljaz bey was a brave man from the village of Petarjet [i.e. Panarit] in the kaza of Përmet, vilayet of Yanina. In the expedition of Sultan Murad Khan II in the territories of Albania, he was taken to the service of the sultans. Accepted the honorable Islamic faith. By exercise and grade after grade, as in the time of the aforementioned sultan, as in the time of Sultan Mehmed II, he was prepared for the conquest of Constantinople. In the Yedikule neighborhood, with the permission of his Padishah, he turned a church into a mosque, today known as the Mosque of Mirahor, or the Mosque of the Church. Near it there is a dervish tekke. He was also made lala (counsellor) of Sultan Bayezid Khan II. When he ascended to the throne, the aforementioned Sultan, he was made mirahor-i evvel (first stableman). After some time he retired and given a çiftlik in the village of Pitarjet - his place of birth - and some nearby villages. When he returned to his home country, bought and immediately ruined a beautiful monastery inside his çiftlik, and in its place built a mosque, an imaret han (soup kitchen), a madrasa and some other buildings, thus laying the foundations of the city of Korça. Then he went in the vilayet of Yanina, in other offices. His çiftliks he made into vaqf and authorised his male progeny to lead them. The aforementioned vaqf is now managed by the beys of Korça, his hereditaries. Of his two children, the first one Inebey (there is a mosque in the neighbourhood of Yeni Kapi connected with his name) was killed in the Bagdad front, and the other became mutevelli of the vaqf in Korça. Mirahor Iljaz bey was considered a pious and holy man. ... Iljaz bey died in 917 Hijri / 1511 and his turbe is to be found near the mosque of Korça.

His türbe was destroyed by the Greek invading forces on 7 December 1912.

== Bibliography ==
- Elsie, Robert (December 1, 2000). A Dictionary of Albanian Religion, Mythology, and Folk Culture. NYU Press. p. 109. ISBN 978-0814722145.
- Zindel, Christian; Lippert, Andreas; Lahi, Bashkim; Kiel, Machiel (2018). Albanien: Ein Archäologie- und Kunstführer von der Steinzeit bis ins 19. Jahrhundert (in German). Vandenhoeck & Ruprecht. ISBN 9783205200109.
