= Vasileios Ioannidis =

Greek theologian and professor

Vasileios Ioannidis (Greek: Βασίλειος Ιωαννίδης; 1896 – 25 November 1963) was a Greek theologian and professor. His research was focused on the analysis and the understanding (hermeneutics) of the New Testament. Ioannidis participated in the first three Assemblies of the World Council of Churches (1947, 1955, and 1961) and was involved in the movement of Ecumenism.

== Life ==
Ioannidis was born in Përmet, modern-day Albania. He initially studied at the Halki seminary in Constantinople (Istanbul) and then continued his studies at the University of Oxford and Humboldt University of Berlin. He became a professor of Theology at the University of Thessaloniki (1942–1951), and later at the Kapodistrian University of Athens (1952–1963).

In 1952 Ioannidis became a member of the Northern Epirus lobby, headed by the exiled bishop of Gjirokastër, Panteleimon Kotokos, which propagated the rights of the Greek population in southern Albania. Ioannidis' research was focused on the interpretation (hermeneutics) of the New Testament, while in 1961 he cooperated with the reformist in the field of education and supporter of the Demotic Greek language, Alexandros Delmouzos. He is considered among the most important 20th century theologians in Greece, along with the former Archbishop of Athens Ieronymos I, Christos Androutsos, Panagiotis Trembelas, Panagiotis Bratsiotis and Ioannis Karmiris.

== Ecumenism and World Council of Churches ==
He was one of the representatives of the Orthodox Church of Greece that participated in the World Council of Churches: in Amsterdam (1948), in Evanston, Illinois, United States (1954), as well as in New Delhi, India (1961). Ioannidis together with another theologian, Amilkas Alivizatos, contributed significantly to the debates that led to the drafting of the "Toronto Statement", a foundational document which facilitated Orthodox participation in the organization and constitutes today its ecclesiological charter. Ioannidis was against the view that the Orthodox church should participate in discussions about Dogmatic theology. On the other hand, he believed that the discussions among the representatives of the various Churches should focus on social and political issues. In general Ioannidis claimed that the Eastern Orthodox Church should play a leading role in the Ecumenism movement.

In several reports about the Second Vatican Council (1962), Ioannidis addressed the importance of such an event, although the results of this, according to him, did not change the relations between the Roman Catholic and the Eastern Orthodox Church.

== Work ==
His main works are:

- Εἰσαγωγή εἰς τήν Καινήν Διαθήκην (1960) – Introduction to the New Testament
- Ὁ ἀπόστολος Παῦλος καί οἱ στωϊκοί φιλόσοφοι (1934, 1957) – The Doctrine of Predestination in St. Paul and the Stoic Philosophers
- Ὁ μυστικισμός τοῦ ἀποστόλου Παύλου καί αἱ θρησκευτικαί ἰδέαι καί τάσεις τῶν ἑλληνιστικῶν χρόνων (1936, 1957) – Mysticism of Saint Paul and religious ideas and trends of the Hellenistic era
- Ἡ βασιλεία τοῦ Θεοῦ κατά τήν διδασκαλίαν τῆς Καινῆς Διαθήκης (1955) – The Kingdom of God according to the instruction of the New Testament
- Το Ευαγγέλιον και το Κοινωνικόν Πρόβλημα (1960) – The Gospel and the Social Problem

Ioannidis also published a number of works about the movement of Ecumenism, as well as articles in various journals.

== Sources ==
- Benz, Ernst (1957). Oekumenische Studien (in German). Brill Archive.

== See also ==
- Schlink, Edmund (1952). "The Nature of the Christian Hope". The Ecumenical Review. 4 (3): 284–290. doi:10.1111/j.1758-6623.1952.tb01487.x. ISSN 1758-6623.
