= Albanian National Army =

Albanian paramilitary group in southeast Europe

- Armata Kombëtare Shqiptare
- Official ensign of the Albanian National Army.
- Leaders: Alban Parishi; Vigan Gradica; Avdil Jakupi; Agim Krasniqi
- Dates active: c. 1999 - c. 2007 (main activity)
- Dissolved: before 2017
- Active regions: Kosovo; Polog, North Macedonia; Preševo Valley
- Ideology: Albanian nationalism Greater Albania
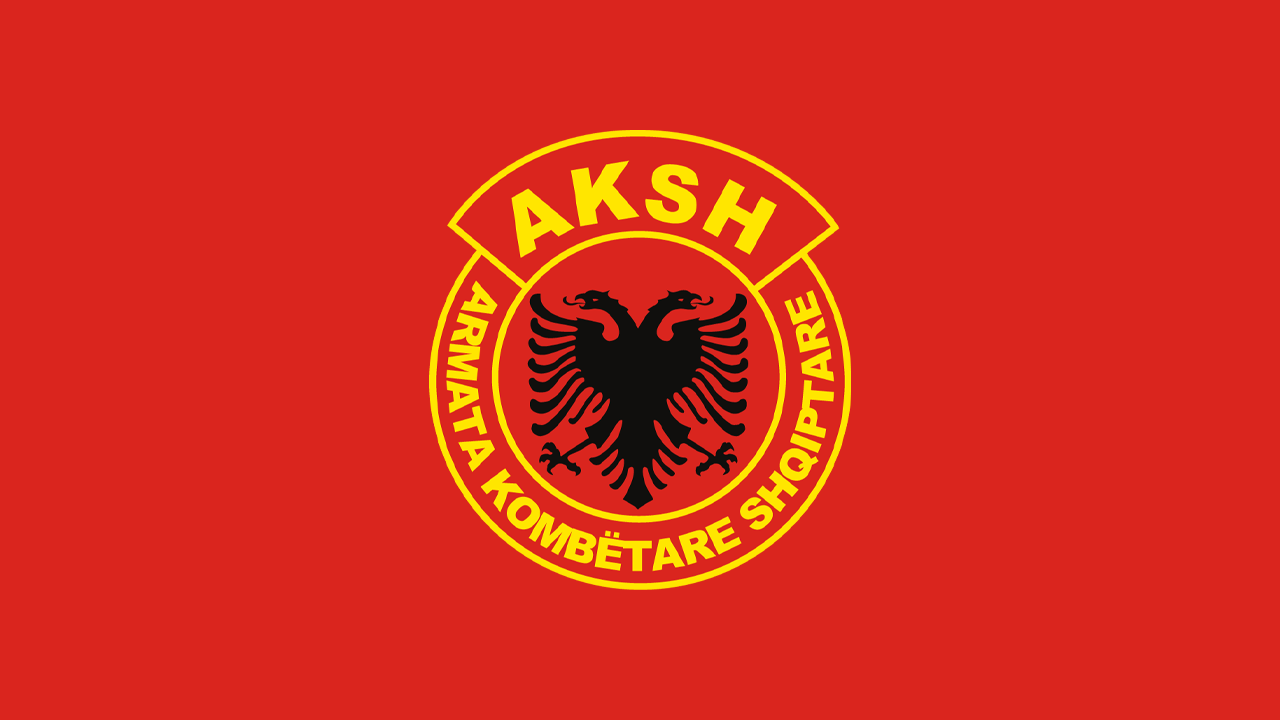
- Flag

The Albanian National Army (ANA; Albanian: Armata Kombëtare Shqiptare, AKSh) was an ethnic Albanian paramilitary organization which operated in North Macedonia, Serbia and Kosovo. The group opposed the Ohrid Framework Agreement which ended the 2001 insurgency in Macedonia between members of the National Liberation Army and Macedonian security forces.

== History ==
ANA's dates of origin are unclear but most observers agree that it was founded between 1999 and 2001. The organization is associated with FBKSh (National Front for Reunification of Albanians), its political wing. ANA released a communiqué in February 2000, claiming responsibility for a January 13, 2000, attack in Aračinovo that resulted in the deaths of four Macedonian police officers. In August 2001, during the 2001 insurgency in Macedonia, it claimed responsibility for killing 10 Macedonian soldiers near Karpalak. ANA condemned the Ohrid agreement and vowed to continue fighting. It declared that it would fight for the creation of Greater Albania.

ANA claimed responsibility for the ambush near Treboš on November 11, 2001, which resulted in the deaths of three policemen and the wounding of three policemen. After the Macedonian parliament adopted the Ohrid agreement's amendments on November 16, ANA announced the beginning of a "war for the liberation of all Albanian territories in former Yugoslavia." However, it admitted to having only a few dozen members. On April 26, 2002, ANA members attacked former National Liberation Army (NLA) members in the village of Mala Rečica near Tetovo. The shootout lasted around two and a half hours. According to some news sources, two people were killed and five were injured. In March 17, 2002, ANA declared the villages of Lisec and Golema Rečica in the Tetovo region, and the neighboring region of Rasadište "liberated territories." After former NLA leader Ali Ahmeti entered mainstream politics in 2002, ANA accused him of betraying Albanian national interests. Both Institute for War and Peace Reporting (IWPR) and NATO spokesman Mark Laity said the group has no public support.

In February 2003, it claimed responsibility for blowing up a courthouse in Struga. The ANA appeared in Kosovo in 2003, where on March 7, two members trying to detonate a bomb were shot and killed by Serbian police. The United Nations Mission in Kosovo added ANA to the UN's official list of terrorist organizations on April 17 after it claimed responsibility for blowing up a railway bridge in a Serb-inhabited part of northern Kosovo. In September 7, 2003, members of ANA clashed with Macedonian security forces on the border with Kosovo, which resulted in the death of two ethnic Albanian gunmen and one civilian. In 2004 and 2005 a group of 80 militants led by a commander of ANA Agim Krasniqi, controlled the village of Kondovo twice. Through the media, Krasniqi threatened to shell Skopje and his men kidnapped and beat four police officers. After this the ANA withdrew into Kosovo.

In 2007, a video was aired by Kosovar television stations depicting a band of medium-armed, masked individuals intercepting cars. In October 2007 the unit declared it would seize the Serb exclave of North Kosovo by force if the Kosovo Protection Force did not occupy it by November 1, 2007. The ANA has claimed that it is patrolling North Kosovo to prevent incursions by the Tsar Lazar Guard.

On November 13, 2007, a video was aired to the public, an exclusive interview with a leader of the ANA, nicknamed "Commander Preka", patrolling in the covert areas of North Kosovo, recruiting 20 new men. The leader stated that ANA stands at 12,000 men altogether and has called the Kosovar population for a boycott of upcoming parliamentary elections.

"The talks will fail, there will be no success. From the year 2000 they [the government] have all lied to us, they say this meeting then the next meeting. We do not believe in them. We do not believe in our leaders, they all lie to us. Therefore we call upon all members, civilian and military, that belong to ANA, to boycott the upcoming elections."

— "Commander Preka"

In 2008, a leader of ANA said that they are "not fighting for pan-Albanian unification, but to protect the territorial integrity of Kosovo if it is threatened." In 2016 Albanian militiamen presenting themselves as the "21st Brigade" published a video showing their weapons and threatening to move through northern Albania and the Preševo Valley. They also mentioned that they had the support of the population and that they had hundreds of men.

== Membership and funding ==
The organization consists of residents of North Macedonia and South Serbia, mostly members of the former Liberation Army of Preševo, Medveđa and Bujanovac, as well as former members of the Kosovo Liberation Army. Its exact size is unclear. IWPR estimated the number of ANA members at around 200 in 2005. Per Southeast European Times in 2007, the organization had roughly 12,000 members. ANA bought weapons from criminal groups in neighboring countries, smuggling them into North Macedonia with horses. Per professor of international relations Maria Koinova, there are allegations that diaspora radicals have funded ANA. In 2002, according to the Macedonian Ministry of Interior, the organization was involved in drug smuggling and used the money to fund its activities in the country.

In 2004, Avdil Jakupi surrendered to authorities in Kosovo. The United Nations Interim Administration Mission in Kosovo transferred him to the Republic on Macedonia on April 29. He was sentenced to fourteen years in prison for kidnapping and robbery. The Albanian political leader Gafur Adili was banned from living in Switzerland in September 2003. He was placed under house arrest in Tirana in the next year. A group led by Lirim Jakupi was originally part of ANA until his imprisonment in Kosovo for attempted murder. In early September 2010, Jakupi, was arrested in Pristina, Kosovo by the Kosovo Police, along with an AK-47, hand grenades, and pistols. He was released in 2017.

== See also ==
- List of conflicts involving Albanian rebel groups in the post–Cold War era
- Liberation Army of Chameria
- Albanian nationalism
