= Leposavić ambush =

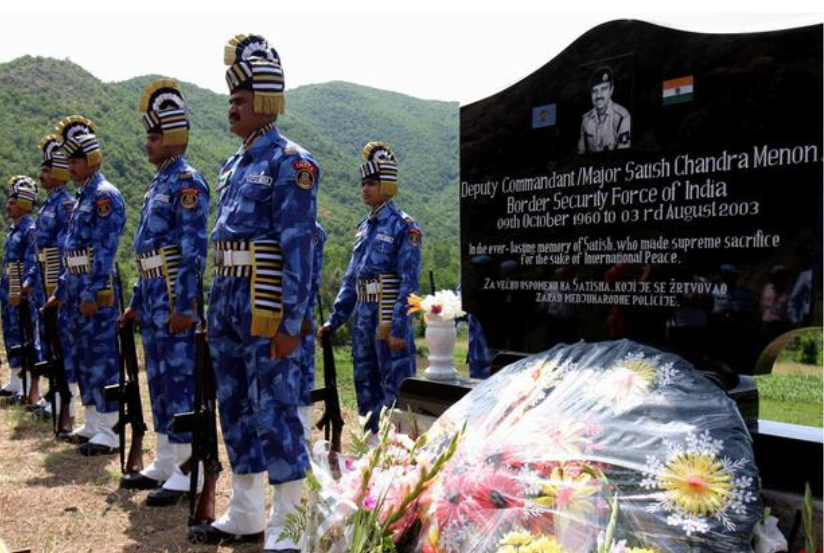
- Indian troops standing by Commander Satish Menon's grave
Date	3 August 2003
Location	Between Leposavić and Mitrovica, North Kosovo

Belligerents
Kosovo Protection Corps (Serbians claim)	UNMIK: (India) Indian Special Police Unit (ISPU); (United Kingdom) British Police

Commanders and leaders
	/ (India) Satish Menon †

Strength
Multiple gunmen	2 police officers

Casualties and losses
None	1 killed

An Indian officer, Satish Menon, was killed in an ambush in North Kosovo. This marked the first deadly assault on Kosovo's UN police force since the Kosovo War, as stated by UN officials.

== Background ==
The United Nations Interim Administration Mission in Kosovo (UNMIK) was established in 1999 following the Kosovo War, which saw NATO intervention to halt Serbian repression of Kosovo Albanians. UNMIK was mandated to administer and govern Kosovo, which was placed under interim UN administration. Its mission included maintaining law and order, facilitating the return of refugees, and promoting democratic governance. UNMIK's presence in Kosovo involved various components, including civil administration, police, judiciary, and civil society.

The mission aimed to build institutions and promote stability while fostering dialogue between different ethnic communities, particularly Albanians and Serbs. In 2003, there were 4,450 UN police members from more than 50 countries in Kosovo, while India was one of the largest contributors. There were 480 Indian security personnel at the time.

== Ambush ==
On 3 August 2003, while Major Satish Menon and another officer were driving their patrol car, they stopped and slowed due to rocks on the road between Leposavić and Mitrovica. During their stop, their car came under heavy gunfire from concealed gunmen. Multiple shots were fired where Menon was sitting and was soon struck, killing him instantly. The driver, a British military police officer, jumped out of the car and avoided injury.

== Aftermath ==
The perpetrators are unknown. The UN indicated that the Albanian National Army was planning on launching an attack, based on information from intelligence over a week before the killing. The UN police launched an investigation in three ethnic Albanian villages near the site of the attack, north of Mitrovica, with the backing of NATO-led peacekeepers, helicopters, and dogs. It also offered US$56,000 to anyone who could provide information leading to the arrest and conviction of the perpetrator. A 21-year-old Serb suspect from a village in Mitrovica was arrested on 25 August by UN police.

=== Reactions ===
==== United Nations ====
UNMIK administrator and American diplomat Charles Brayshaw strongly denounced the ambush, labeling it as "despicable" and "repugnant" act of murder while also condemning it as "a direct attack on international forces of law and order." UN secretary-general Kofi Annan expressed his condolences to Menon's family and the Indian government, and said the "guilty must be brought to justice for this appalling act."

==== Kosovo Albanians ====
On the Albanian side, local politicians attributed the shooting to "Serb extremist elements." However, despite the attack occurring in the Serb-dominated north of the province, the UN was investigating the possibility that it might have been carried out by a hardline ethnic Albanian group. The President of Kosovo, Ibrahim Rugova, described the killing as "a crime committed by extremists who are against progress in Kosovo."
