= Kreshnik Spahiu =

Leader of the Red and Black Alliance

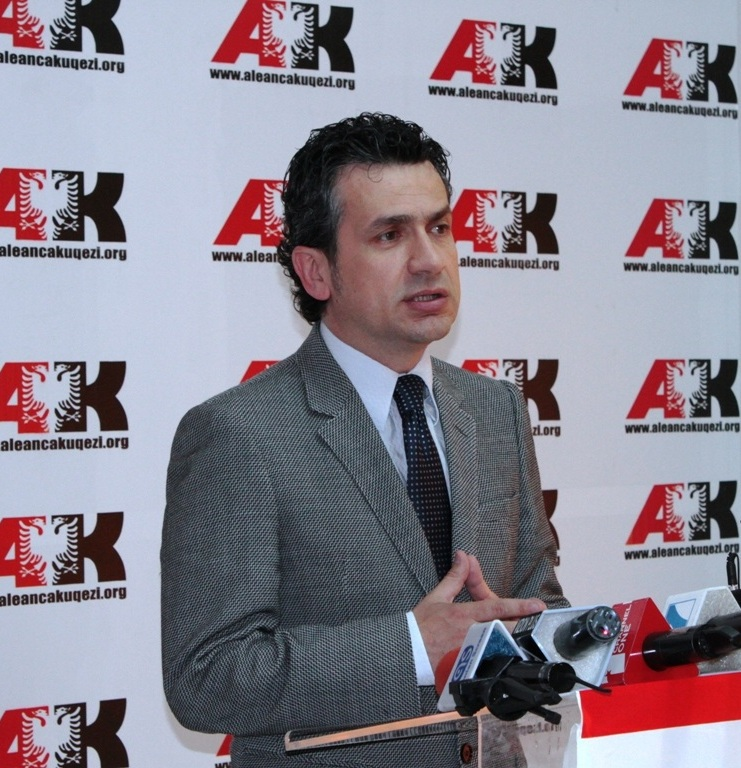

1st Leader of the Red and Black Alliance
- Incumbent
- Assumed office March 20, 2012

Deputy chairman of the High Council of Justice
- In office July 19, 2007 – February 10, 2012 (resigned)
- Succeeded by: Elvis Çefa

Head of Transparency International in Albania
- In office 2006 – July 19, 2007 (resigned)

Personal details
- Born: April 21, 1969 (age 56) Tirana, Albania
- Party: Red and Black Alliance
- Profession: Jurist Politician

Kreshnik Spahiu (born April 21, 1969) is an Albanian lawyer and politician. In 1991, he graduated in Law from the University of Tirana. He is the founder and leader of the Red and Black Alliance since 2012. Between 2007 and 2012 he was head of the High Council of Justice of Albania until he resigned on 10 February.
