= KLD =

KLD may refer to:

== Transport ==
- Kildale railway station, England (station code)
- Klender railway station, Indonesia (station code)

== Others ==
- Gamilaraay language, ISO 639-3 language code
- High Council of Justice (Këshilli i Lartë i Drejtësisë), former council in Albania
- Kernel Loadable Module, the FreeBSD term for loadable kernel module
- Ministry of Climate and Environment (Klima- og miljødepartementet), ministry in Norway
- Kongres Liberalno-Demokratyczny, Polish political party
- Kullback–Leibler divergence, a measure between probability distributions
