= Myslim Pashaj =

Albanian politician

Myslim Pashaj (born 1945) is a retired colonel and retired head of cartographic center of Albania. He was one of the main opposers of the Albanian-Greek Sea border pact, which he called a loss of Albanian territory. He won the case in the Constitutional Court of Albania. He got blackmailed and some people claimed they would kill him for opposing the pact.

Pashaj was the general secretary of the Red and Black Alliance and declared irrevocable resignation on 13 May.
