= Avdil Jakupi =

Albanian commander (born 1974)

- Born: 20 April 1974 (age 52); Tanuševci, SR Macedonia
- Military career
- Allegiance: Liberation Army of Preševo, Medveđa and Bujanovac; National Liberation Army; Albanian National Army
- Rank: Commander
- Unit: 113th Brigade "Ismet Jashari"

Avdil Jakupi (Macedonian: Авдил Јакупи), also known by his nom de guerre "Commander Jackal" (Albanian: Komandant Çakalli; Macedonian: Командант Чакала), is an Albanian commander of Albanian National Army (ANA), former member of the Liberation Army of Preševo, Medveđa and Bujanovac (UÇPMB) and National Liberation Army (NLA).

== Life ==
Advil Jakupi was born on 20 April 1974 in Tanuševci, SR Macedonia (now North Macedonia). He was a member of the Liberation Army of Preševo, Medveđa and Bujanovac and National Liberation Army. Jakupi led a group formed in 2003. British defense intelligence officer Anthony Tucker-Jones estimated that he had not more than seventy fighters. In the 2000s, he was placed on United States' blacklist. On 27 August 2003, Jakupi and fifteen other members of the ANA kidnapped two policemen. Jakupi demanded that an ethnic Albanian man who was imprisoned for placing bombs in Kumanovo be released. The policemen were freed. The Macedonian National Security Council gave the green light to the police to arrest ethnic Albanian gunmen active in the northwest of the country. An operation to capture the members was carried out by the Macedonian police in the north of Macedonia. Hundreds of ethnic Albanians fled the area. Police withdrew in September after their search alarmed the local people and after the villagers of Vaksince assured the police that Jakupi was no longer there. In 11 September, the interior minister Hari Kostov ordered deputy interior minister Hazbi Lika, Administration for Security and Counterintelligence's deputy director Fatmir Dehari and deputy from public security bureau Besir Dehari the order to conduct an action to arrest him and another commander, with the deadline being a month.

He was placed on the European Union's blacklist on 10 February 2004. In 2004, Jakupi surrendered to authorities in Kosovo. The United Nations Interim Administration Mission in Kosovo transferred him to the Republic on Macedonia on 29 April. A court in Skopje sentenced him to around ten years for kidnapping and robbery in the Idrizovo prison in 20 December. His lawyers claimed the trial was politically motivated. In June 2017, he wrote a letter to Macedonian prime minister Zoran Zaev, requesting to be released and said that he was imprisoned for a crime he did not commit. He was released from prison in 2018.
