= Liberation Army of Chameria =

Separatist pro-albanian organisation in the Northern Greece

- Ushtria Çlirimtare e Çamërisë
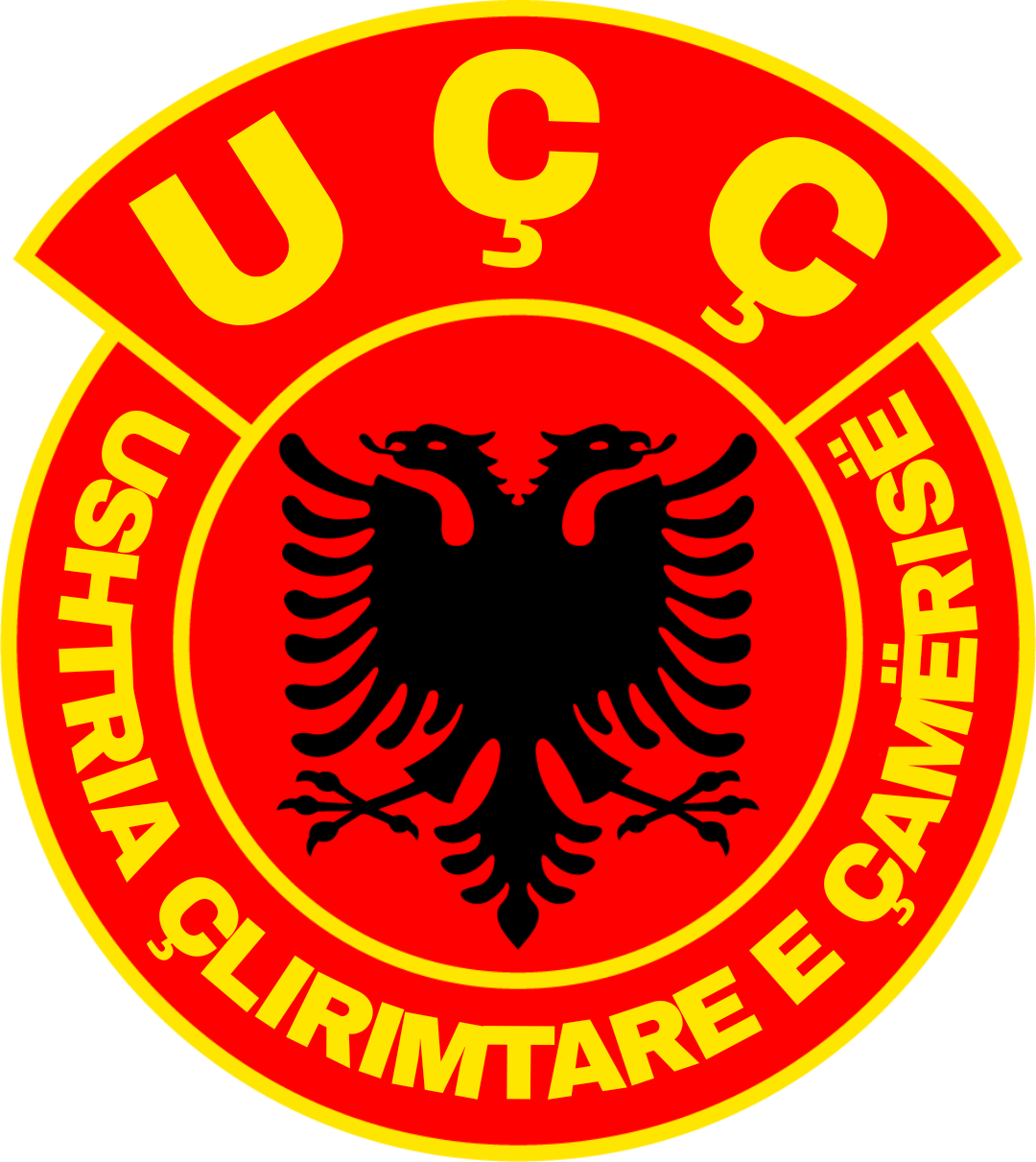
- Founded: 2001
- Dates active: 2001-present
- Active regions: Albania
- Ideology: Greater Albania; Albanian nationalism Separatism; Irredentism
- Size: 30–40
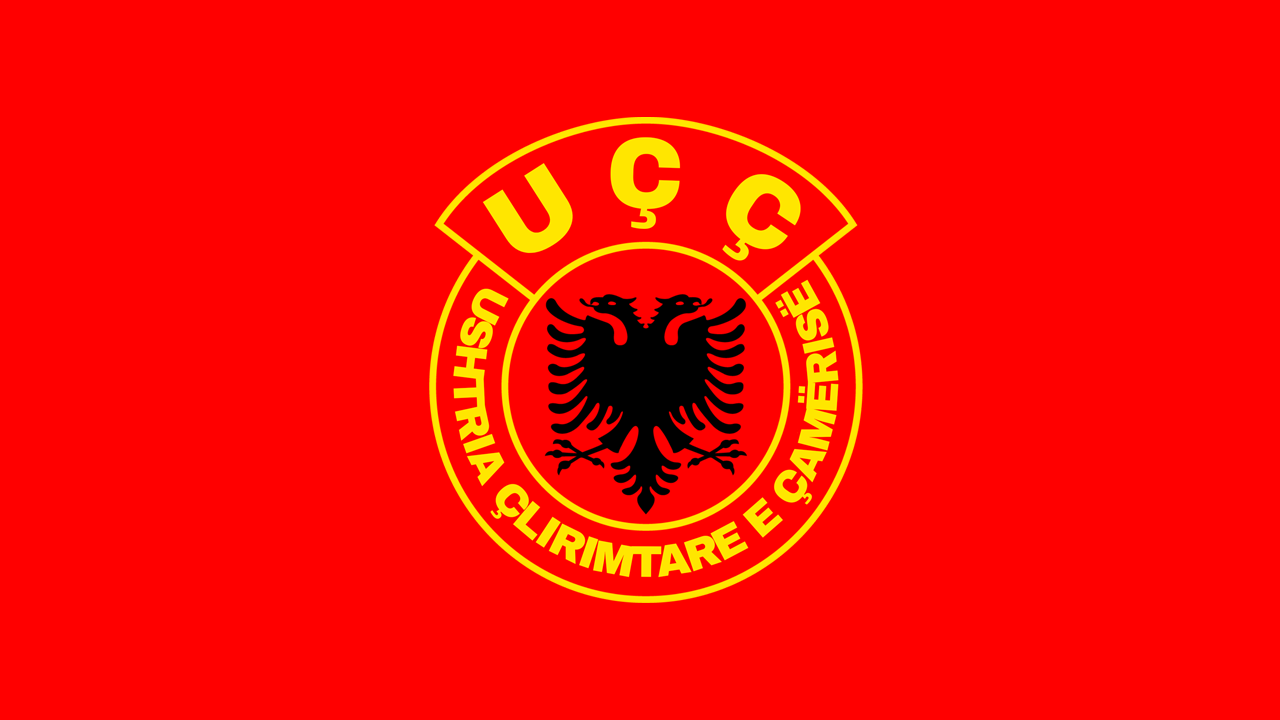
- Flag

The Liberation Army of Chameria (LAC, Albanian: Ushtria Çlirimtare e Çamërisë, abbr. UÇÇ) is a reported paramilitary organization founded in 2001 that is active in the northwestern Greek region of Epirus. The group is reportedly linked to the Kosovo Liberation Army (KLA) and National Liberation Army (NLA), both ethnic Albanian militant groups.

== History ==
In 2010, a video was released on Yahoo Screen showing concealed members of the UÇÇ, with former NLA leader Ali Ahmeti stating that the Liberation Army would form in southern Albania, to defend the ethnic Albanians who had "no rights":

"Circa 1 million Albanians in Northwestern Greece [Chameria], live without any rights, and the Albanian Liberation Army of Chameria will soon be ready for action as the legitimate representative of Albanians in defence of their rights."

— Ali Ahmeti

Ahmeti later denied that he ever stated such statements in an interview with the BBC, with the Greek media and government dismissing any reports of the organization existing.

In Mount Grammos, an important focus of action for the guerrillas of the Liberation Army of Chameria, they frequently clash with Greek government troops, as well as in the town of Threspotia, also on the border with Albania, which is a site of separatist activity.

In 2005, the UÇÇ dropped leaflets over the Greek city of Ioannina, which declared that they would liberate Chameria from Greece. When U.S. President George W. Bush visited Tirana on 10 June 2007, a delegation of the UÇÇ delivered a letter with nationalist requests. Other UÇÇ delegations delivered letters to the U.S. embassies in Rome and Tirana.

In 2011, Greek police arrested ethnic Albanian criminals for smuggling light weapons into Chameria. Speculation arose questioning the motive for this, while some believe the weapons were meant for an UÇÇ weapons depot located in a forest. In 2012, Greek authorities reported that ethnic Albanian criminal groups were financing the UÇÇ and its activities by use of drug trafficking.

== Strength ==
In 2001, the Greek police reported that the group consisted of approximately 30–40 Albanians. It does not have the official support of the Albanian government.

== See also ==
- Albanian nationalism
- Greater Albania
- Kosovo Liberation Army
- National Liberation Army
- Albanian National Army
- Northern Epirus Liberation Front
