= Greater Albania =

Nationalist concept to unite "traditionally Albanian" territories

Proposal of 4 autonomous "Albanian vilayets" within the Ottoman Empire by the League of Prizren, as agreed after the Albanian revolt of 1912

Greater Albania (Albanian: Shqipëria e Madhe) is an irredentist and nationalist concept that seeks to unite the lands that many Albanians consider to form their national homeland. It is based on claims on the present-day or historical presence of Albanian populations in those areas. In addition to the existing Albania, the term incorporates claims to regions in the neighbouring states, the areas include Kosovo, the Preševo Valley of Serbia, territories in southern Montenegro, northwestern Greece (the Greek regional units of Thesprotia and Preveza, referred by Albanians as Chameria, and other territories that were part of the Vilayet of Yanina during the Ottoman Empire), and a western part of North Macedonia. The combination of the populations of these countries and territories of other countries sustaining large ethnic Albanian communities enumerate to over 4 million people.

The unification of an even larger area into a single territory under Albanian authority had been theoretically conceived by the League of Prizren, an organization of the 19th century whose goal was to unify the Albanian inhabited lands (and other regions, mostly from the regions of Macedonia and Epirus) into a single autonomous Albanian Vilayet within the Ottoman Empire, which was briefly achieved de jure in September 1912. The concept of a Greater Albania, as in greater than Albania within its 1913 borders, was conceived and implemented under the fascist Italian and Nazi German occupation of the Balkans during World War II. The idea of unification has roots in the events of the Treaty of London in 1913, when roughly 50% of the predominantly Albanian territories and 40% of the population were left outside the new country's borders.

== Terminology ==
Albanian nationalists dislike the expression "Greater Albania" and prefer to use the term "Ethnic Albania". Ethnic Albania (Albanian: Shqipëria Etnike) is a term used primarily by Albanian nationalists to denote the territories claimed as the traditional homeland of ethnic Albanians, despite these lands also being inhabited by many non-Albanians. Those that use the second term refer to an area which is smaller than the four Ottoman vilayets, while still encompassing Albania, Kosovo, western North Macedonia, Albanian populated areas of Southern Serbia and parts of Northern Greece (Chameria) that had a historic native Albanian population. Albanian nationalists ignore that within these regions there are also sizable numbers of non-Albanians. Another term used by Albanians is "Albanian national reunification" (Albanian: Ribashkimi kombëtar shqiptar).

== History ==
=== Under the Ottoman Empire ===
Prior to the Balkan Wars of the beginning of the 20th century, Albanians were subjects of the Ottoman Empire. The Albanian independence movement emerged in 1878 with the League of Prizren (a council based in Kosovo) whose goal was cultural and political autonomy for ethnic Albanians inside the framework of the Ottoman Empire. However, the Ottomans were not prepared to grant The League's demands. Ottoman opposition to the League's cultural goals eventually helped transform it into an Albanian national movement.

Albanian nationalism overall was a reaction to the gradual breakup of the Ottoman Empire and a response to Balkan and Christian national movements that posed a threat to an Albanian population that was mainly Muslim. Efforts were devoted to including vilayets with an Albanian population into a larger unitary Albanian autonomous province within the Ottoman state while Greater Albania was not considered a priority. Albanian nationalism during the late Ottoman era was not imbued with separatism that aimed to create an Albanian nation-state, though Albanian nationalists did envisage an independent Greater Albania. Albanian nationalists were mainly focused on defending rights that were sociocultural, historic and linguistic within existing countries without being connected to a particular polity.

=== Balkan Wars and Albanian independence (1912–1913) ===
The imminence of collapsing Ottoman rule through military defeat during the Balkan Wars pushed Albanians represented by Ismail Qemali to declare independence (28 November 1912) in Vlorë from the Ottoman Empire. The main motivation for independence was to prevent Balkan Albanian inhabited lands from being annexed by Greece and Serbia. Italy and Austria-Hungary supported Albanian independence due to their concerns that Serbia with an Albanian coast would be a rival power in the Adriatic Sea and open to influence from its ally Russia. Apart from geopolitical interests, some Great powers were reluctant to include more Ottoman Balkan Albanian inhabited lands into Albania due to concerns that it would be the only Muslim dominated state in Europe. Russo-French proposals were for a truncated Albania based on central Albania with a mainly Muslim population, which was also supported by Serbia and Greece who considered that only Muslims could only be Albanians. As more Albanians became part of the Serbian and Greek states, Albanian scholars with nationalistic perspectives interpret the declaration of independence as a partial victory for the Albanian nationalist movement.

=== World War II ===
On 7 April 1939, Italy's Benito Mussolini, after a prolonged interest and overarching sphere of influence during the interwar period, invaded Albania. Italian fascists like Count Galeazzo Ciano pursued Albanian irredentism, believing it would earn Italy support among Albanians while aligning with Italy's war aim of Balkan conquest. The Italian annexation of Kosovo to Albania was popular with Albanians in both areas. The Western part of North Macedonia was also annexed to the Italian protectorate of Albania. In these territories, all (including non-Albanians) were obliged to attend Albanian schools that taught a nationalistic and fascist curriculum; all were compelled to use or adopt Albanian names and surnames. Elites, such as landowners and liberal nationalists opposed to communism, formed the Balli Kombëtar organisation; they and the collaborationist government sought to preserve Greater Albania.

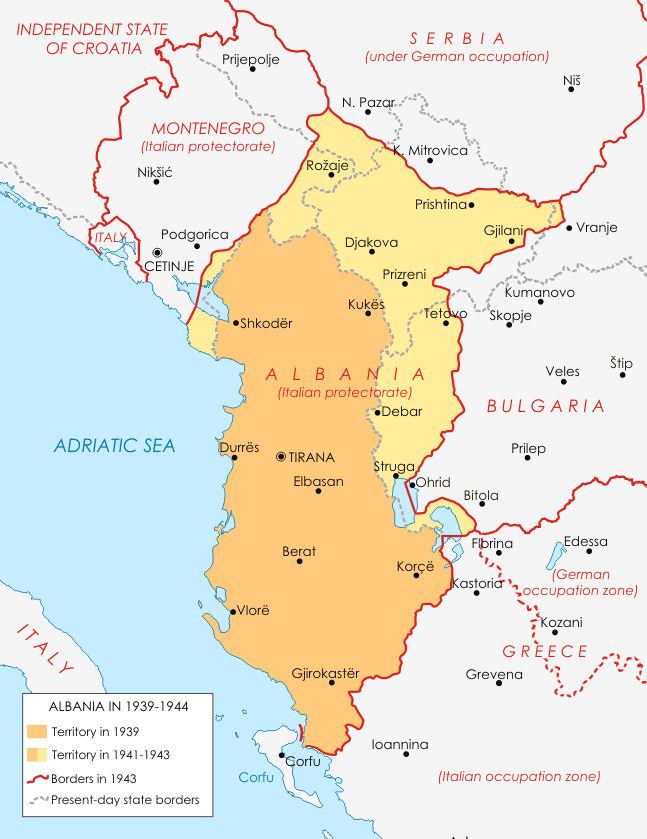
The Italian Protectorate of Albania established by Italy in August 1941.

Many Kosovo Albanians were preoccupied with driving out the Serb community, particularly the post-1919 Serb and Montenegrin colonists, often settled on confiscated Albanian property. Albanians saw Serbian and Yugoslav rule as foreign, and according to Ramet they felt that anything would be better than the chauvinism, corruption, administrative hegemonism and exploitation they had experienced under the Serbian authorities. Albanians collaborated broadly with the Axis occupiers, who had promised them a Greater Albania. Collapse of Yugoslav rule resulted in actions of revenge being undertaken by Albanians, some joining the local Vulnetari militia that burned Serb settlements and killed Serbs while interwar Serb and Montenegrin colonists were expelled into Territory of the Military Commander in Serbia. The aim of these actions was to create a homogeneous Greater Albanian state. Italian authorities in Kosovo allowed the use of the Albanian language in schools, university education, and administration. The same nationalist, Albanian elements who welcomed Kosovo's Albanians into an enlarged state also worked against the Italians, viewing them as foreign occupiers. An attempt to get Kosovan Albanians to join the resistance, a meeting in Bujan (1943–1944), northern Albania was convened between Balli Kombëtar members and Albanian communists that agreed to common cause and maintain the expanded boundaries. The deal was opposed by Yugoslav partisans, and later rescinded, resulting in limited enthusiasm among Kosovan Albanian recruits. Some Balli Kombëtar members such as Shaban Polluzha became partisans with the view that Kosovo would become part of Albania. At the war's end, some Kosovar Albanians felt betrayed by the return to Yugoslav rule, and for several years, Albanian nationalists in Kosovo resisted both the Partizans and later the new Yugoslav army. Albanian nationalists viewed their inclusion within Yugoslavia as an occupation.

The Albanian Fascist Party became the ruling party of the Italian Protectorate of Albania in 1939 and the prime minister Shefqet Verlaci approved the possible administrative union of Albania and Italy, because he wanted Italian support for the union of Kosovo, Chameria and other "Albanian irredentism" into Greater Albania. Indeed, this unification was realized after the Axis occupation of Yugoslavia and Greece from spring 1941. The Albanian fascists claimed in May 1941 that nearly all the Albanian populated territories were united to Albania.

Between May 1941 and September 1943, Benito Mussolini placed nearly all territory inhabited by ethnic Albanians under a quisling Albanian government. That included parts of Kosovo, parts of Vardar Macedonia, and some border areas of Montenegro. In Chameria, an Albanian high commissioner, Xhemil Dino, was appointed by the Italians, but the area remained under the control of the Italian military command in Athens, and so technically remained a region of Greece.

When the Germans occupied the area and replaced the Italians, they maintained the borders created by Mussolini. However, after World War II, the Allies returned borders to their pre-war status.

=== Yugoslav Wars ===
The Kosovo Liberation Army (KLA) was an ethnic-Albanian paramilitary organisation which sought the separation of Kosovo from Yugoslavia during the 1990s and the eventual creation of a Greater Albania, encompassing Kosovo, Albania, and the ethnic Albanian minority of neighbouring Macedonia. The KLA found great moral and financial support among the Albanian diaspora.

KLA Commander Sylejman Selimi insisted:

There is de facto Albanian nation. The tragedy is that European powers after World War I decided to divide that nation between several Balkan states. We are now fighting to unify the nation, to liberate all Albanians, including those in Macedonia, Montenegro, and other parts of Serbia. We are not just a liberation army for Kosovo.

By 1998 the KLA's operations had evolved into a significant armed insurrection. According to the report of the USCRI, the "Kosovo Liberation Army ... attacks aimed at trying to 'cleanse' Kosovo of its ethnic Serb population." The UNHCR estimated the figure at 55,000 refugees who had fled to Montenegro and Central Serbia, most of whom were Kosovo Serbs.

Its campaign against Yugoslav security forces, police, government officers and ethnic Serb villages precipitated a major Yugoslav military crackdown which led to the Kosovo War of 1998–1999. Military intervention by Yugoslav security forces led by Slobodan Milošević and Serb paramilitaries within Kosovo prompted an exodus of Kosovar Albanians and a refugee crisis that eventually caused NATO to intervene militarily in order to stop what was widely identified as an ongoing campaign of ethnic cleansing.

The war ended with the Kumanovo Treaty, with Yugoslav forces agreeing to withdraw from Kosovo to make way for an international presence. The Kosovo Liberation Army disbanded soon after this, with some of its members going on to fight for the UÇPMB in the Preševo Valley and others joining the National Liberation Army (NLA) and Albanian National Army (ANA) during the armed ethnic conflict in Macedonia.

=== 2000s–present ===
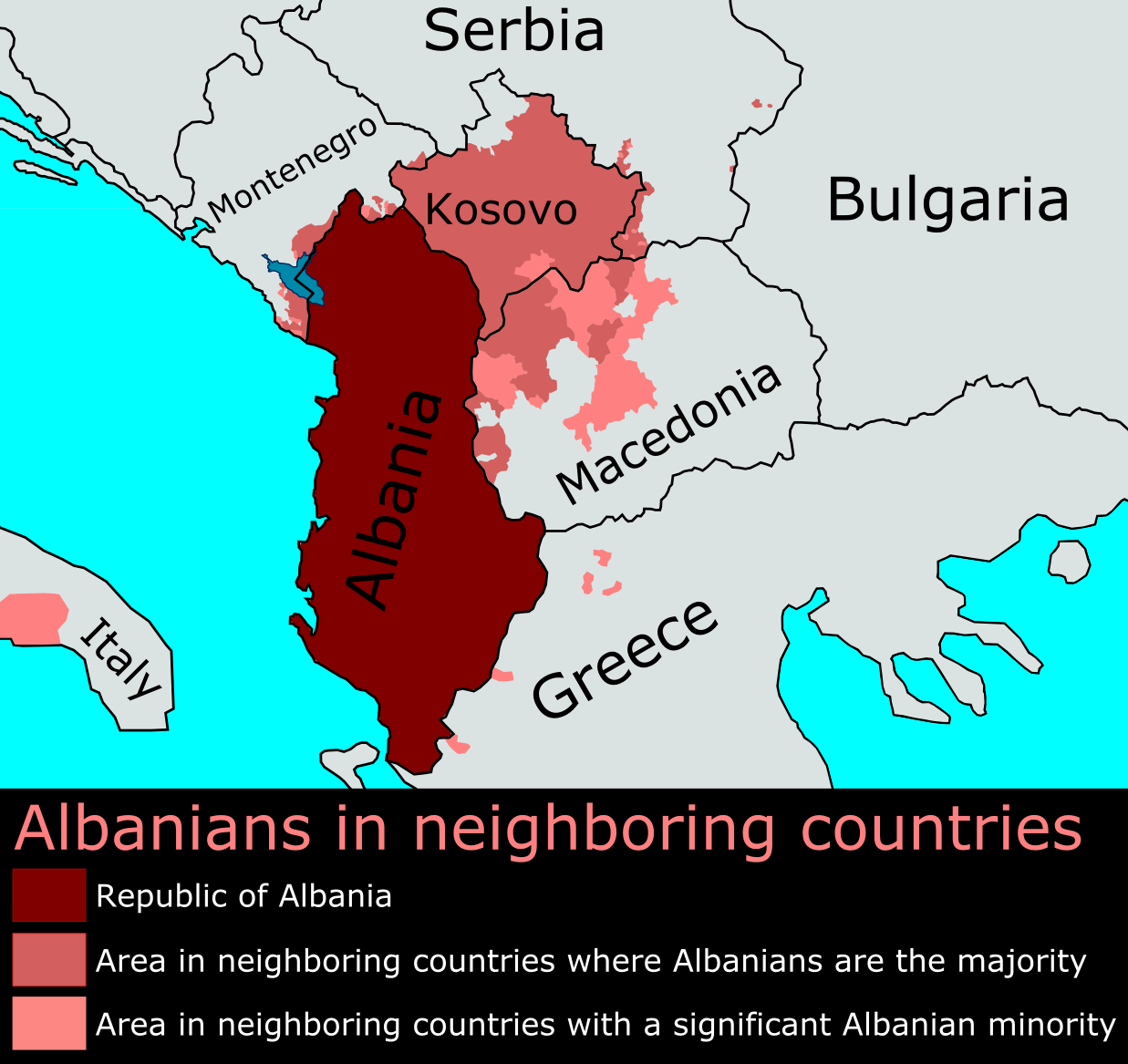
Distribution of Albanians in the Balkans.

Political parties advocating and willing to fight for a Greater Albania emerged in Albania during the 2000s. They were the National Liberation Front of Albanians (KKCMTSH) and Party of National Unity (PUK) that both merged in 2002 to form the United National Albanian Front (FBKSh) which acted as the political organisation for the Albanian National Army (AKSh) militant group and consisted of some disaffected KLA and NLA members. Regarded internationally as terrorist both have gone underground and its members have been involved in various violent incidents in Kosovo, Serbia and Macedonia during the 2000s. In the early 2000s, the Liberation Army of Chameria (UCC) was a reported paramilitary formation that intended to be active in northern Greek region of Epirus. Political parties active only in the political scene exist that have a nationalist outlook are the monarchist Legality Movement Party (PLL), the National Unity Party (PUK) alongside the Albanian National Front Party (PBKSh), a party to have passed the electoral threshold and enter parliament. These political parties, some of whom advocate for a Greater Albania have been mainly insignificant and remained at the margins of the Albanian political scene. The Kosovo question has limited appeal among Albanian voters who generally speaking are not interested in electing parties advocating redrawn borders creating a Greater Albania. Centenary Albanian independence celebrations in 2012 generated nationalistic commentary among the political elite of whom prime-minister Sali Berisha referred to Albanian lands as extending to Preveza, northern Greece and Preševo, southern Serbia angering Albania's neighbors. In Kosovo, a prominent left wing nationalist movement turned political party Vetëvendosje (Self Determination) has emerged who advocates for closer Kosovo-Albania relations and pan-Albanian self determination in the Balkans. Another smaller nationalist party, the Balli Kombetar Kosovë (BKK) sees itself as an heir to the original Second World War organisation that supports Kosovan independence and pan-Albanian unification. Greater Albania remains mainly in the sphere of political rhetoric and overall Balkan Albanians view EU integration as the solution to combat crime, weak governance, civil society and bringing different Albanian populations together.

On 19 July 2020, singer of Albanian descent Dua Lipa faced backlash after she shared an image of a banner associated with supporters of extreme Albanian nationalism. The same banner had sparked controversy at the 2014 Serbia vs. Albania football game. The banner depicts the irredentist map of Greater Albania, with the caption, "autochthonous". In response, Twitter users, many of them Macedonian, Greek, Montenegrin and Serbian, accused the singer of ethno-nationalism. Political scientist Florian Bieber described Lipa's tweet as "stupid nationalism".

In Feb 2021, in an interview with Euronews, Albin Kurti, former Prime Minister of Kosovo, said that he would personally vote to unify Albania and Kosovo.

== Public opinion ==
According to the Gallup Balkan Monitor 2010 report, the idea of a Greater Albania was supported by the majority of Albanians in Albania (63%), Kosovo (81%) and the Republic of Macedonia (53%), although the same report noted that most Albanians thought this unlikely to happen.

In a survey carried out by United Nations Development Programme (UNDP), published in March 2007, only 2.5% of the Albanians in Kosovo thought unification with Albania is the best solution for Kosovo. Ninety-six percent said they wanted Kosovo to become independent within its present borders.

According to a 2019 poll by Open Society Foundations that covered 2,504 respondents in both countries, 79.4% of Kosovar Albanian respondents were in favor of unification between Albania and Kosovo, compared to 82.9% of the respondents in Albania. When asked whether they would be willing to pay a tax for unification, 66.1% of respondents in Kosovo agreed, compared to 45.5% in Albania.

== Political uses of the concept ==
The Albanian question in the Balkan peninsula is in part the consequence of the decisions made by Western powers in late 19th and early 20th century. The Treaty of San Stefano and the 1878 Treaty of Berlin assigned Albanian inhabited territories to other States, hence the reaction of the League of Prizren.

In 2000, the then-US Secretary of State Madeleine Albright said that the international community would not tolerate any efforts towards the creation of a Greater Albania.

In 2004, the Vetëvendosje movement was formed in Kosovo, which opposes foreign involvement in Kosovan affairs and campaigns instead for the sovereignty the people, as part of the right of self-determination. Vetëvendosje obtained 12.66% of the votes in an election in December 2010, and the party manifesto calls for a referendum on union with Albania.

In 2012, the Red and Black Alliance (Albanian: Aleanca Kuq e Zi) was established as a political party in Albania, the core of its program is national unification of all Albanians in their native lands.

In 2012, as part of the celebrations for 100th Anniversary of the Independence of Albania, Prime Minister Sali Berisha spoke of "Albanian lands" stretching from Preveza in Greece to Presevo in Serbia, and from the Macedonian capital of Skopje to the Montenegrin capital of Podgorica, angering Albania's neighbours. The comments were also inscribed on a parchment that will be displayed at a museum in the city of Vlore, where the country's independence from the Ottoman Empire was declared in 1912.

=== Use in other media ===
The concept is also often used, especially with Ilirida (the proposed western region of North Macedonia), by nationalists in circles of Macedonian and Serbian politics in bids to rally support.

== Areas ==
| State/region/community | Territory | Area (km^{2}) | Total population | Albanians |
|---|---|---|---|---|
| Albania | Albania | 28,748 | 2,821,977 | 2,312,356 (82% of total state pop.) (95% of those who declared ethnicity) |
| Kosovo (Kosovo Albanians) | Kosovo | 10,887 | 1,739,825 (2011 census) | 1,616,869 (93% of total state pop.) |
| Southeastern and eastern Montenegro (Albanian community in Montenegro) | Montenegro: Kraja, Mërkot and Shestan (Ulcinj and Bar), Malësia (Tuzi) and Sandžak/Sanxhak (especially the municipalities of Plav, Gusinje and Rožaje) | 1,173–1,400 | 620,029 (2011 census) | 30,439 (4.9% of total state pop.) |
| Western North Macedonia/Illirida (Albanian community in North Macedonia) | North Macedonia: Western and north-western areas | 2,500–4,500 | 1,836,713 (2021 census) | 446,245 (24.3% of total state pop.) |
| Preševo Valley (Albanian community in central Serbia) | Serbia: Districts of Pčinja, Jablanica, Toplica, Nišava and Pirot (especially the municipalities of Preševo, Bujanovac and Medveđa), and Sandžak/Sanxhak (especially Pešter/Masbjeshka: ie. the municipalities of Novi Pazar, Tutin and Sjenica) | 725–1,249 | 120,966 (2021 census data) | 96,595 (80% of Preševo Valley) |
| Epirus/Chameria (Cham Albanians) | Greece: Southern Epirus (especially the units of Thesprotia and Preveza) | N/A | N/A | N/A |

=== Kosovo ===
Kosovo has an overwhelmingly Albanian majority, estimated to be around 90%. The 2011 census stated a higher percentage Albanian people, but due to the exclusion of northern Kosovo, a Serb-dominated area, and a partial boycott by the Romani and Serb population in south Kosovo, those numbers are unreliable.

=== Montenegro ===
The irredentist claims in Montenegro are in the border areas, including Kraja, Mërkot and Shestan (Ulcinj and Bar), Malësia (Tuzi) and Sandžak (Plav, Gusinje, and Rožaje). According to the 2023 census, the Albanian proportion in those municipalities are following: Ulcinj (74%), Tuzi (63%), Gusinje (34%), Plav (9%), Rožaje (5%), Bar (4%) and Podgorica (1%). The claim on the Sandžak area, where the Albanian community is small and the Bosniak community is the majority, is based on the Albanian state borders in World War II and presence in the late Ottoman period.

=== North Macedonia ===
The western part of North Macedonia is an area with a large ethnic Albanian minority. The Albanian population in North Macedonia make up 25% of the population, numbering 509,083 in the 2002 census. Cities with Albanian majorities or large minorities include Tetovo (Tetova), Gostivar (Gostivari), Struga (Struga) and Debar (Diber).

In the 1980s, Albanian irredentist organizations appeared in the SR Macedonia, particularly Vinica, Kicevo, Tetovo and Gostivar. In 1992, Albanian activists in Struga proclaimed also the founding of the Republic of Ilirida (Albanian: Republika e Iliridës) with the intention of autonomy or federalization inside Macedonia. The declaration had only a symbolic meaning and the idea of an autonomous State of Ilirida is not officially accepted by the ethnic Albanian politicians in North Macedonia.

=== Preševo Valley ===
The irredentist claims in Central Serbia (excluding Kosovo) are in the southern Preševo Valley, including municipalities of Preševo (Albanian: Preshevë), Bujanovac (Albanian: Bujanoc) and partially Medveđa (Albanian: Medvegjë), where there is an Albanian community. In 2001, the Albanians were estimated to have numbered 70,000 in the area. According to the 2021 census, the Albanian proportion in those municipalities were following: Preševo–34,098 (95%), Bujanovac–29,681 (67%), Medveđa–2,816 (26%).

Following the Kosovo War (1998–99), the Albanian separatist Liberation Army of Preševo, Medveđa and Bujanovac (Albanian: Ushtria Çlirimtare e Preshevës, Medvegjës dhe Bujanocit, UÇPMB), fought an insurgency against the Serbian government, aiming to seceding the Preševo Valley into Kosovo.

There are some maximalist claims on five districts of South-Eastern Serbia (Pčinja, Jablanica, Toplica, Nišava and Pirot), corresponding to the historical presence of Albanians, in the Sanjak of Niš, before 1878.

Claims on the Pešter Plateau lay on the idea that ethnic Bosniaks living there are Serbianized Albanians.

=== Greece ===
The irredentist claim in Greece are Chameria, parts of Epirus, the historical Vilayet of Janina.

The coastal region of Thesprotia in northwestern Greece referred to by Albanians as Çamëria is sometimes included in Greater Albania. According to the 1928 census held by the Greek state, there were around 20,000 Muslim Cams in Thesprotia prefecture. They were forced to seek refuge in Albania at the end of World War II after a large part of them collaborated and committed a number of crimes together with the Nazis during the 1941–1944 period. In the first post-war census (1951), only 123 Muslim Çams were left in the area. Descendants of the exiled Muslim Chams (they claim that they are now up to 170,000 now living in Albania) claim that up to 35,000 Muslim Çams were living in southern Epirus before World War II. Many of them are currently trying to pursue legal ways to claim compensation for the properties seized by Greece. For Greece the issue "does not exist".

== International Crisis Group research ==
International Crisis Group researched the issue of Pan-Albanianism and published a report titled "Pan-Albanianism: How Big a Threat to Balkan Stability?" in February 2004.

The International Crisis Group advised in the report the Albanian and Greek governments to endeavour and settle the longstanding issue of the Chams displaced from Greece in 1945, before it gets hijacked and exploited by extreme nationalists, and the Chams' legitimate grievances get lost in the struggle to further other national causes. Moreover, the ICG findings suggest that Albania is more interested in developing cultural and economic ties with Kosovo and maintaining separate statehood.

== See also ==
- Albanian nationalism
- Albanian National Awakening
- Albanophobia
- History of Albania
- History of the Balkans
- Kosovo independence precedent
- League of Prizren
- Unification of Albania and Kosovo
