= Albanian nationalism =

Nationalist ideas related to Albanian people

Albanian nationalism is a general grouping of nationalist ideas and concepts generated by ethnic Albanians that were first formed in the 19th century during the Albanian National Awakening (Albanian: Rilindja). Albanian nationalism is also associated with similar concepts, such as Albanianism ("Shqiptaria") and Pan-Albanianism, that includes ideas on the creation of a geographically expanded Albanian state or a Greater Albania encompassing adjacent Balkan lands with substantial Albanian populations.

The onset of the Great Eastern Crisis (1875–1878), which threatened the partition of Albanian-inhabited lands of the Balkans by neighbouring Orthodox Christian states, stimulated the emergence of the Albanian National Awakening and the nationalist movement. During the 19th century, some Western scholarly influences, Albanian diaspora groups such as the Arbëresh and Albanian National Awakening figures contributed greatly to spreading influences and ideas among the Balkan Albanians, within the context of Albanian self-determination. Among those were ideas of an Illyrian contribution to Albanian ethnogenesis, which still dominate Albanian nationalism in contemporary times. The idea of Illyrian-Albanian continuity is the founding myth of the Albanian nation. Other ancient peoples are also claimed as ancestors, in particular the Epirotes and the Pelasgians. These national myths are important in order to geopolitically support claims of autochthony in Greater Albania (most importantly in Kosovo and North Macedonia).

Due to overlapping and competing territorial claims with other Balkan nationalisms and states over land dating from the late Ottoman period, these ideas comprise a national myth. These myths aim to establish precedence over neighbouring peoples (Slavs and Greeks) and allow movements for independence and self-determination, as well as irredentist claims against neighbouring countries. Pan-Albanian sentiments are also present in Albanian nationalism. Due to the success of the Albanian revolt of 1912 the Ottomans agreed to the creation of an autonomous Albanian Vilayet however it was never implemented as the Balkan League took advantage of the weakened Ottoman state and invaded, territories which were supposed to be given to the Albanian vilayet were partitioned between the Balkan league states. Part of Kosovo and western Macedonia were united by Axis Italian forces to their protectorate of Albania and upon Italy's surrender the same territories were incorporated into the German client state during the Second World War. Albanian nationalism contains a series of myths relating to Albanian origins, cultural purity and national homogeneity, religious indifference as the basis of Albanian national identity, and continuing national struggles. The figure of Skanderbeg is one of the main constitutive figures of Albanian nationalism that is based on a person, as other myths are based on ideas, abstract concepts, and collectivism.

Contemporary Albanian nationalism, like other forms of ethnic nationalism, asserts that Albanians are a nation and promotes the cultural, social, political and linguistic unity of Albanians. This form of nationalism has featured heavily in Albanian society and politics since the 1990s and 2000s, due to the Yugoslav Wars, Kosovo independence, the status of Albanians in North Macedonia and the ever growing Albanian diaspora.

Contemporary Albanian nationalism has high levels of support among ethnic Albanians within the Balkans and especially in the diaspora. It has come to serve as a force for unity, celebration and promotion of Albanian culture and identity. Furthermore, it has tried to serve as a political tool in securing pan-Albanian interests in the Balkan region and abroad, as seen with the high level of cooperation between Albania and Kosovo, unity among Albania's diverse religious communities, cooperation between diaspora communities and their homelands and pan-Albanian external lobbying.

In response to Kosovo's independence, foreign relations, policy impositions by the European Union, relations with neighbours such as Serbia and growing assimilation in the diaspora, Albanian nationalism has become an important tool in promoting and protecting Albanian values, identity and interests. For example, Albanian nationalism has featured prominently in sport since Kosovo was admitted to FIFA and UEFA. Since admission there have been debates questioning whether there is one ‘national team’ or two, whether Kosovo-born fans should remain loyal to the Albanian side or embrace the Kosovo side and Kosovar symbolism and how Albanians cope with having two predominately ethnic Albanian states.

== History ==
=== Background ===
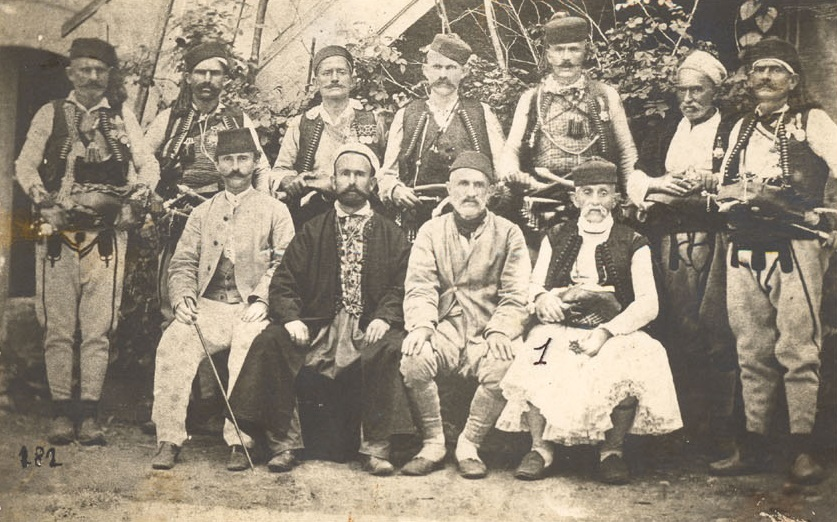
Group photo of some Prizren League delegates (1878)

Some authors argue that Albanian nationalism, unlike its Greek and Serbian counterparts has its origins in a different historical context that did not emerge from an anti-Ottoman struggle and instead dates to the period of the Eastern Crisis (1878) and threat of territorial partition by Serbs and Greeks, while others hold views that Albanian nationalism emerged earlier as a societal reform movement that turned into a geopolitical one in response to the events of 1878, reacting against both the policies of Ottoman rule and those of rival Balkan nationalisms. Competing with neighbours for contested areas forced Albanians to make their case for nationhood and seek support from European powers. Some scholars disagree with the view that Albanian nationalism emerged in 1878 or argue that the paradigm of setting a specific start date is wrong, but those events are widely considered a pivotal moment that led to the politicization of the Albanian national movement and the emergence of myths being generated that became part of the mythology of Albanian nationalism that is expressed in contemporary times within Albanian collective culture and memory. That historical context also made the Albanian national movement defensive in outlook as nationalists sought national affirmation and to counter what they viewed as the erosion of national sentiments and language. By the 19th century Albanians were divided into three religious groups. Catholic Albanians had some Albanian ethno-linguistic expression in schooling and church due to Austro-Hungarian protection and Italian clerical patronage. Orthodox Albanians fell under the authority of the Constantinople Patriarchate, which controlled the Orthodox schools and churches, using only the Greek language for instruction and worship. Muslim Albanians during this period formed around 70% of the overall Balkan Albanian population in the Ottoman Empire with an estimated population of more than a million. Albanian schools had been prohibited by the Ottoman Porte and contrasted by the Constantinople Patriarchate and local Greek clerics as they feared that educated Albanians could contribute to the Albanian national consciusness.

=== Eastern Crisis and Albanian National Awakening ===
Just as we are not and do not want to be Turks, so we shall oppose with all our might anyone who would like to turn us into Slavs or Austrians or Greeks, we want to be Albanians.

— Excerpt from the League of Prizren memorandum to the British delegation at the Berlin Congress, 1878,

O moj Shqypni (Oh Albania)
"Albanians, you are killing kinfolk,
You're split in a hundred factions,
Some believe in God or Allah,
Say "I'm Turk," or "I am Latin,"
Say "I'm Greek," or "I am Slavic,"
But you're brothers, hapless people!
You have been duped by priests and hodjas
To divide you, keep you wretched....
Who has the heart to let her perish,
Once a heroine, now so weakened!
Well-loved mother, dare we leave her
To fall under foreign boot heels ?...
Wake, Albanian, from your slumber,
Let us, brothers, swear in common
And not look to church or mosque,
The Albanian's faith is Albanianism [to be Albanian]!

— Excerpt from O moj Shqypni by Pashko Vasa, 1878.

With the rise of the Eastern Crisis, Muslim Albanians became torn between loyalties to the Ottoman state and the emerging Albanian nationalist movement. Islam, the Sultan and the Ottoman Empire were traditionally seen as synonymous in belonging to the wider Muslim community. The Albanian nationalist movement advocated self-determination and strived to achieve socio-political recognition of Albanians as a separate people and language within the state. Albanian nationalism was a movement that began among Albanian intellectuals without popular demand from the wider Albanian population. Geopolitical events pushed Albanian nationalists, many Muslim, to distance themselves from the Ottomans, Islam and the then emerging pan-Islamic Ottomanism of Sultan Abdulhamid II. During the Russo-Turkish war, the incoming Serb army expelled most of the Muslim Albanian population from the Toplica and Niš regions into Kosovo triggering the emergence of the League of Prizren (1878–1881) as a response to the Eastern crisis. The League of Prizren was created by a group of Albanian intellectuals to resist partition among neighbouring Balkan states and to assert an Albanian national consciousness by uniting Albanians into a unitary linguistic and cultural nation. The Ottoman state briefly supported the league's claims viewing Albanian nationalism as possibly preventing further territorial losses to newly independent Balkan states. The geopolitical crisis generated the beginnings of the Rilindja (Albanian National Awakening) period. From 1878 onward Albanian nationalists and intellectuals, some who emerged as the first modern Albanian scholars, were preoccupied with overcoming linguistic and cultural differences between Albanian subgroups (Gegs and Tosks) and religious divisions (Muslim and Christians). At that time, these scholars lacked access to many primary sources to construct the idea that Albanians were descendants of Illyrians, while Greater Albania was not considered a priority. Compared with their Balkan counterparts, these Albanian politicians and historians were very moderate and mainly had the goal to attain socio-political recognition and autonomy for Albanians under Ottoman rule. Albanians involved in these activities were preoccupied with gathering and identifying evidence, at times inventing facts to justify claims to "prove" the cultural distinctiveness and historical legitimacy of the Albanians in being considered as a nation.

Taking their lead from the Italian national movement, the Arbëresh, (an Albanian diaspora community settled throughout southern Italy from the medieval period) began to promote and spread national ideas by introducing them to Balkan Albanians. Prominent among them were Girolamo de Rada, Giuseppe Schirò and Demetrio Camarda of whom were influenced through literature on Albania by Western scholars and referred within their literary works to Skanderbeg and a pre-Ottoman past, with reference to Pyrrhus of Epirus and Alexander the Great. While Muslim (especially Bektashi) Albanians were heavily involved with the Albanian National Awakening producing many figures like Faik Konitza, Ismail Qemali, Midhat Frashëri, Shahin Kolonja and others advocating for Albanian interests and self-determination. The Bektashi Sufi order of the late Ottoman period in Southern Albania also played a role during the Albanian National Awakening by cultivating and stimulating Albanian language and culture and was important in the construction of national Albanian ideology. Among Catholic Albanian figures involved were Prenk Doçi, Gjergj Fishta and Pashko Vasa who penned the famous poem Oh Albania which called for Albanians overcoming religious divisions through a united Albanianism. The last stanza of Vasa's poem Feja e shqyptarit asht shqyptarija (The faith of the Albanian is Albanianism) became during the national awakening period and thereafter a catchword for Albanian nationalists.

=== Skanderbeg ===
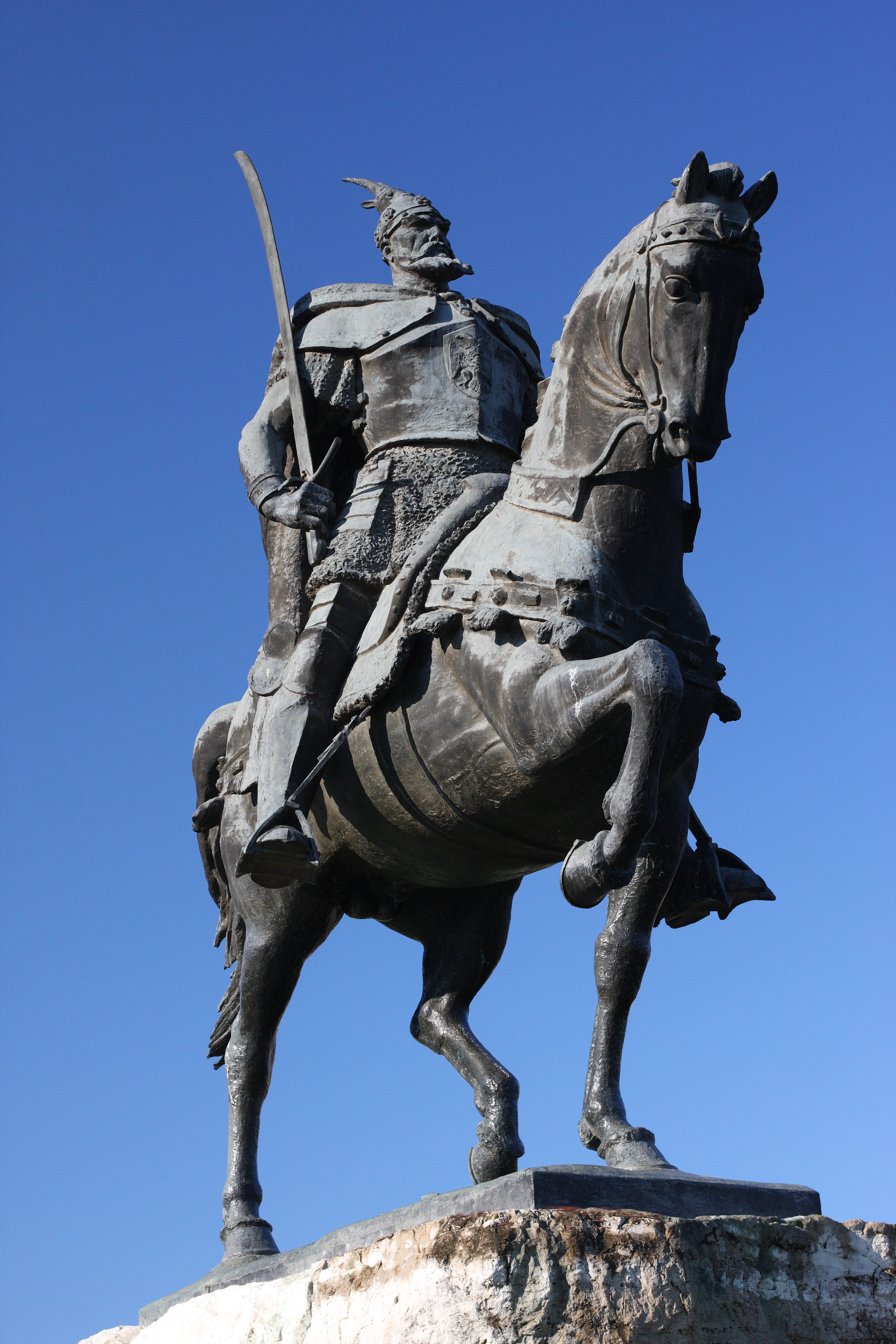
Skanderbeg Monument in Tirana.

Another factor overlaying geopolitical concerns during the National Awakening period were thoughts that Western powers would only favour Christian Balkan states and peoples in the anti Ottoman struggle. During this time Albanian nationalists attempting to gain Great Power sympathies and support conceived of Albanians as a European people who under Skanderbeg resisted Ottoman Turks that later subjugated and cut the Albanians off from Western European civilisation. Skanderbeg subliminally presented Albanians as defending Europe from "Asiatic hordes" to western powers and allowed Albanians to develop the myth of Albanian resistance to foreign enemies that threatened the "fatherland" and the unity of the Albanian nation. Albanian nationalists needed an episode from medieval history to centre Albanian nationalist mythology upon and chose Skanderbeg in the absence of a medieval kingdom or empire. From the 15th to the 19th century Skanderbeg's fame survived mainly in Western Europe and was based on a perception of Skanderbeg's Albania serving as Antemurale Christianitatis (a barrier state) against "invading Turks". As a result of Skanderbeg's adaptation as a national hero, Albanians had to turn their back on the Ottoman Empire. Skanderbeg's Christian identity was avoided and he was presented mainly as a defender of the nation. Albanian nationalist writers transformed Skanderbeg's figure and deeds into a mixture of historical facts, truths, half-truths, inventions, and folklore.

=== Western influences and origin theories ===
In the 19th century Western academia imparted its influence on the emerging Albanian identity construction process by providing tools that were utilised and transformed in certain contexts and toward goals within a changing environment. This differed from the context from which Western authors had originally generated their theories. Albanian nationalists of the period were educated in foreign schools abroad. Some 19th century Western academics examining the issue of Albanian origins promoted the now-discredited theory of Albanian descent from ancient Pelasgians. Developed by the Austrian linguist Johann Georg von Hahn in his work Albanesiche Studien (1854) the theory claimed the Pelasgians as the original proto-Albanians and the language spoken by the Pelasgians, Illyrians, Epirotes and ancient Macedonians being closely related. This theory quickly attracted support in Albanian circles, as it established a claim of precedence over other Balkan nations, the Slavs and particularly the Greeks. In addition to generating a "historic right" to territory, this theory also established that ancient Greek civilization and its achievements had an "Albanian" origin.

The Pelasgian theory was adopted among early Albanian publicists and used by Italo-Albanians, Orthodox and Muslim Albanians. Italo-Albanians being of the Greek rite and their culture having strong ecclesiastical Byzantine influence were not in favour of the Illyrian-Albanian continuity hypothesis as it had overtones of being Catholic and hence Italianate. For Italo-Albanians, the origins of the Albanians lay with the Pelasgians, an obscure ancient people that lived during antiquity in parts of Greece and Albania. To validate Albanian claims for cultural and political emancipation, Italo-Albanians maintained that Albanian was the oldest language in the region, even older than Greek. The theory of Pelasgian origins was used by the Greeks to attract and incorporate Albanians into the Greek national project through references to common Pelasgian descent. The Pelasgian theory was welcomed by some Albanian intellectuals who had received Greek schooling. For Orthodox Albanians such as Anastas Byku a common ancestry of both Albanians and Greeks through Pelasgian ancestors made both peoples the same and viewed Albanian as a conduit for Hellenisation. For Muslim Albanians like Sami Frashëri Albanians stemmed from the Pelasgians, an older population than Illyrians thereby predating the Greeks making for him the Albanians descendants of Illyrians who themselves originated from Pelasgians. Figures originating from the ancient period such as Alexander the Great and Pyrrhus of Epirus were enveloped in myth and claimed as Albanian men of antiquity while Philip II of Macedon, the ancient Macedonians were Pelasgian or Illyrian-Albanian.

Albanian writers of the period felt that they had counter arguments that came from the Greek side and from Slavic circles. The Greeks claimed that Albanians did not constitute a people, their language was a mixture of different languages and that an Albanian member of the Orthodox church was "really a Greek", while Slav publicists claimed that Kosovar Albanians were "really" Slavs or they were "Turks" who could be "sent back" to Anatolia. Apart from Greek nationalism being viewed as a threat to Albanian nationalism, emphasising an antiquity of the Albanian nation served new political contexts and functions during the 1880s. It also arose from the Albanian need to counter Slavic national movements seeking independence from the Ottomans through a Balkan federation. In time the Pelasgian theory was replaced with the Illyrian theory regarding Albanian origins and descent due it being more convincing and supported by a number of scholars, The Illyrian theory became an important pillar of Albanian nationalism due to its consideration as evidence of Albanian continuity in territories such as Kosovo and the south of Albania contested with the Serbs and Greeks.

=== Geopolitical consequences and legacy ===
Unlike their Greek, Serbian and Bulgarian neighbours who had territorial ambitions, Albanians due to being mainly Muslim lacked a powerful European patron. This made many of them want to preserve the status quo and back Ottomanism. By the early 20th century, Albanian nationalism was advanced by a wide-ranging group of Albanian politicians, intellectuals and exiles. An Albanian emigrant community was present in the United States during the late 19th and early 20th centuries with the majority being illiterate and individuals like Sotir Peci worked to impart a sense of Albanian nationhood among them encouraging the spread of literacy in Albanian. In 1908, an alphabet congress in Bitola with Muslim, Catholic and Orthodox delegates in attendance agreed to adopt a Latin character-based Albanian alphabet and the move was considered an important step for Albanian unification. Opposition toward the Latin alphabet came from some Albanian Muslims and clerics who with the Ottoman government preferred an Arabic-based Albanian alphabet, due to concerns that a Latin alphabet undermined ties with the Muslim world. Due to the alphabet matter and other Young Turk policies, relations between Albanian elites and nationalists, many Muslim and Ottoman authorities broke down. Though at first Albanian nationalist clubs were not curtailed, the demands for political, cultural and linguistic rights eventually made the Ottomans adopt measures to repress Albanian nationalism which resulted in two Albanian revolts (1910 and 1912) toward the end of Ottoman rule.

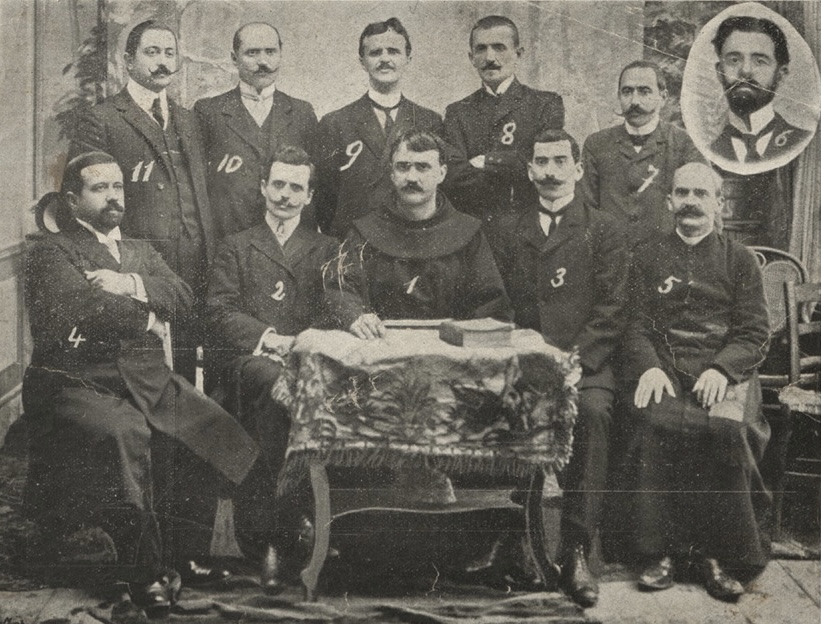
Delegates from the Alphabet Congress of Manastir (1908)

Albanian nationalism during the late Ottoman era was not imbued with separatism that aimed to create an Albanian nation-state, though Albanian nationalists did envisage an independent Greater Albania. Albanian nationalists of the late Ottoman period were divided into three groups. Pan-Albanian nationalists, those who wanted to safeguard Albanian autonomy under an Ottoman state and an Albania divided along sectarian lines with an independent Catholic Albania envisaged mainly by Catholics. The emerging Albanian nationalist elite promoted the use of Albanian as a medium of political and intellectual expression. Albanian nationalism overall was a reaction to the gradual breakup of the Ottoman Empire and a response to Balkan and Christian national movements that posed a threat to an Albanian population that was mainly Muslim. Efforts were devoted to including vilayets with an Albanian population into a larger unitary Albanian autonomous province within the Ottoman state.

Albanian nationalists were mainly focused on defending rights that were sociocultural, historic and linguistic within existing countries without being connected to a particular polity. Unlike other Balkan nationalisms religion was seen as an obstacle and Albanian nationalism competed with it and developed an anti clerical outlook. As Albanians lived in an Ottoman millet system that stressed religious identities over other forms of identification, the myth of religious indifference was formed during the National Awakening as a means to overcome internal religious divisions among Albanians. Promoted as civil religion of sorts, Albanianism as an idea was developed by Albanian nationalists to downplay established religions such as Christianity and Islam among Albanians while a non-religious Albanian identity was stressed. Religion did not play a significant role as in other Balkan nationalisms or to mainly become a divisive factor in the formation of Albanian nationalism which resembled Western European nationalisms. The Albanian language instead of religion became the primary focus of promoting national unity. Albanian National Awakening figures during the late Ottoman period generated vernacular literature in Albanian. Often those works were poems which contained nationalist aspirations and political themes which in part secured support for the Albanian nationalist cause when transformed into narrative songs that spread among the male population of Albanian speaking villagers in the Balkans. Nation building efforts gained momentum after 1900 among the Catholic population by the clergy and members such as craftsmen and traders of the Bektashi and Orthodox community in the south. With a de-emphasis of Islam, the Albanian nationalist movement gained the strong support of two Adriatic sea powers Austria-Hungary and Italy who were concerned about pan-Slavism in the wider Balkans and Anglo-French hegemony purportedly represented through Greece in the area.

=== Independence and interwar period ===
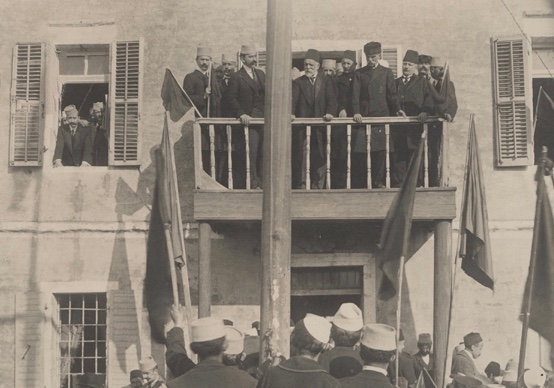
Ismail Qemali on the first anniversary of the session of the Assembly of Vlorë which proclaimed the Independence of Albania.

The imminence of collapsing Ottoman rule through military defeat during the Balkan wars pushed Albanians represented by Ismail Qemali to declare independence (28 November 1912) in Vlorë from the Ottoman Empire. The main motivation for independence was to prevent Balkan Albanian inhabited lands from being annexed by Greece and Serbia. On the eve of independence the bulk of Albanians still adhered to pre-nationalist categories like religious affiliation, family or region. Both highlanders and peasants were unprepared for a modern nation state and it was used as an argument against Albanian statehood. With the alternative being partition of Balkan Albanian inhabited lands by neighbouring countries, overcoming a fragile national consciousness and multiple internal divisions was paramount for nationalists like state leader Ismail Qemali. Developing a strong Albanian national consciousness and sentiment overrode other concerns such as annexing areas with an Albanian population like Kosovo. Kosovar Albanian nationalism has been defined through its clash with Serbian nationalism where both view Kosovo as the birthplace of their cultural and national identities. Ottoman rule ended in 1912 during the Balkan Wars with Kosovo and North Macedonia becoming part of Serbia. During this time Serb forces in Kosovo engaged in killings and forced migration of Albanians while the national building aims of the Serbian state were to assimilate some and remove most Albanians by replacing them with Serbian settlers. The Serb state believed that Albanians had no sense of nationhood while Albanian nationalism was viewed as the result of Austro-Hungarian and Italian intrigue. These events fostered feelings of Albanian victimisation and defeatism, grudges against the Serbs and Great Powers who had agreed to that state of affairs which ran alongside Albanian nationalism. Kosovar Albanian nationalism drew upon and became embedded in popular culture such as village customs within a corpus of rich historical myths, distinctive folk music referring to harvests along with marriage and clan based law.

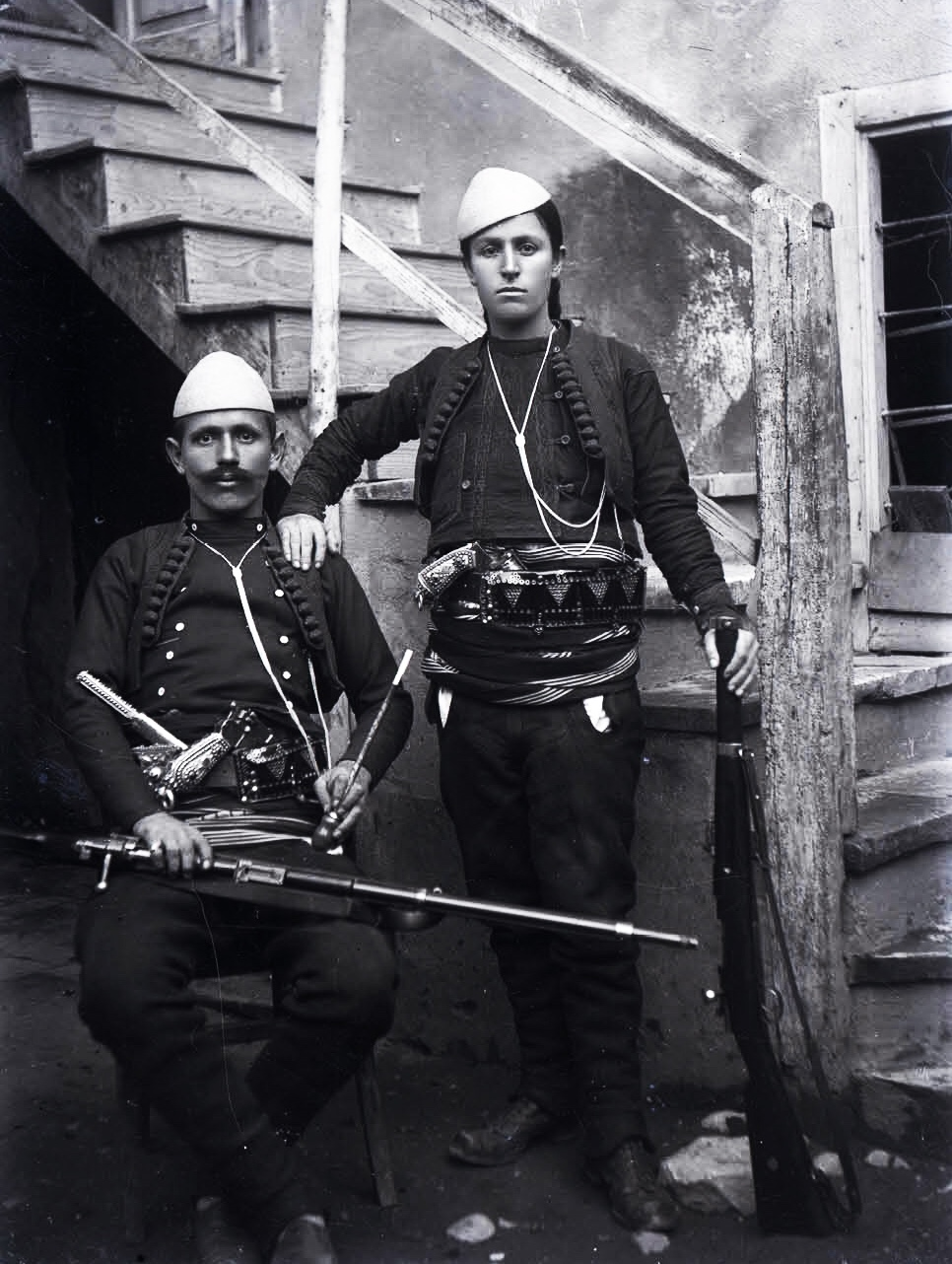
Azem Galica and Shota Galica, leaders of the Kaçak movement (1920)

Albania during World War I was occupied by foreign powers and they pursued policies which strengthened expressions of Albanian nationalism especially in Southern Albania. Italian and French authorities closed down Greek schools, expelled Greek clergy and pro-Greek notables while allowing Albanian education with the French sector promoting Albanian self-government through the Korçë republic. Another factor that reinforced nationalistic sentiments among the population was the return of 20–30,000 Orthodox Albanian emigrants mainly to the Korçë region who had attained Albanian nationalist sentiments abroad. The experience of World War I, concerns over being partitioned and loss of power made the Muslim Albanian population support Albanian nationalism and the territorial integrity of Albania. An understanding also emerged between most Sunni and Bektashi Albanians that religious differences needed to be sidelined for national cohesiveness. During the First World War occupation by Austro-Hungarian forces Albanian schools were opened in Kosovo that later were shut down during the interwar years by Yugoslav authorities while religious Islamic education was only permissible in Turkish. Secular education in Albanian within Kosovo, Macedonia and other areas in Yugoslavia with an Albanian population was banned and replaced with a Serbian school curriculum. Yugoslav education policy repressed Albanian secular education to undermine sentiments of Albanian national identity and culture with a view to preventing possible nationalist challenges to Yugoslavia. Albanian schooling moved into tekkes, maktabs and madrasas that emerged as underground centres for spreading and generating Albanian nationalism. Religious Muslim schools by the 1930s became viewed as a threat to the state and Yugoslav authorities replaced Albanian Muslim clergy with pro-Serbian Slavic Muslim clergy and teachers from Bosnia to prevent Albanian nationalist activities developing in religious institutions. Albanians opposed those moves and boycotted imposed teachers. Albanian was prohibited by Yugoslav authorities and some Albanians were made to emigrate.

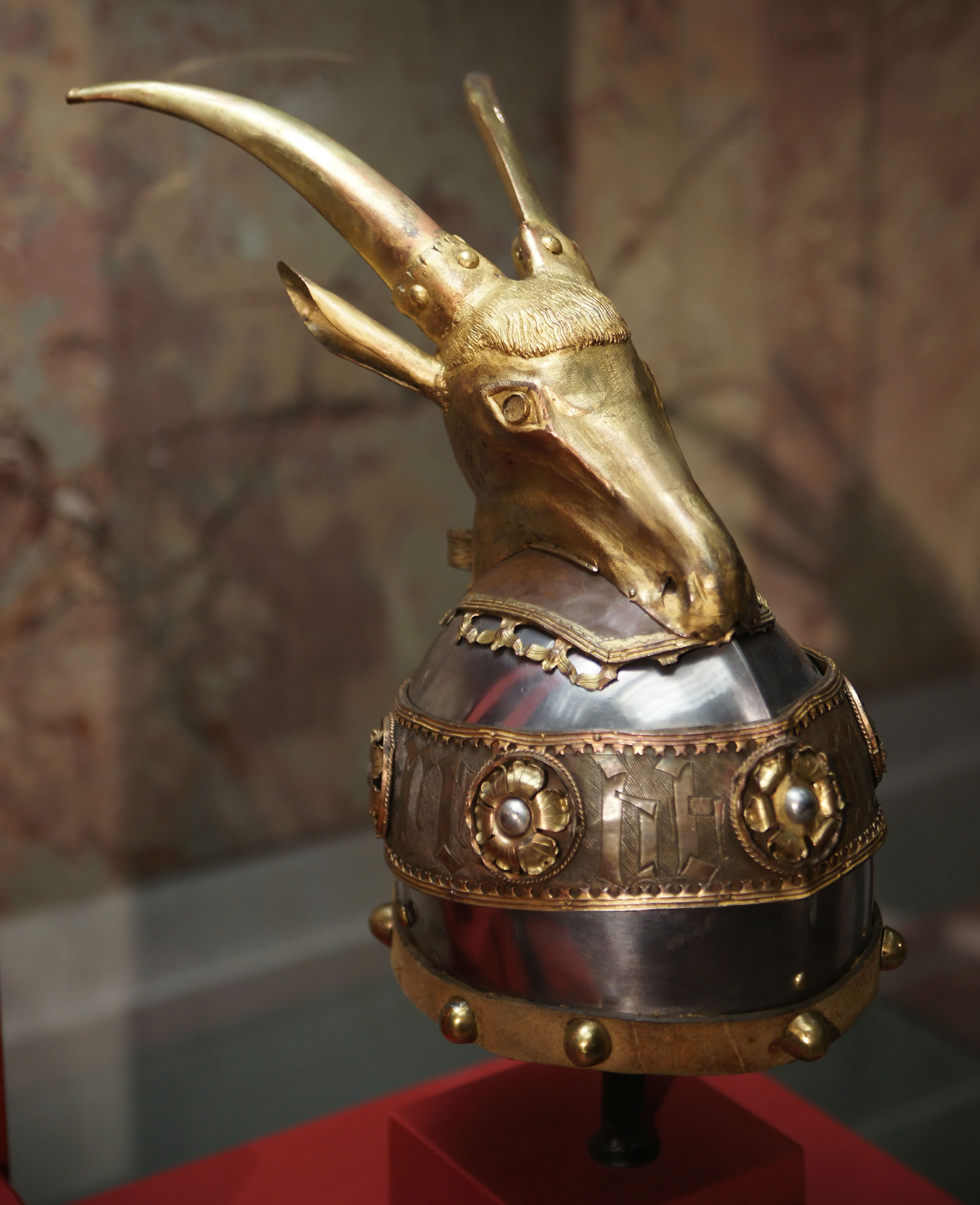
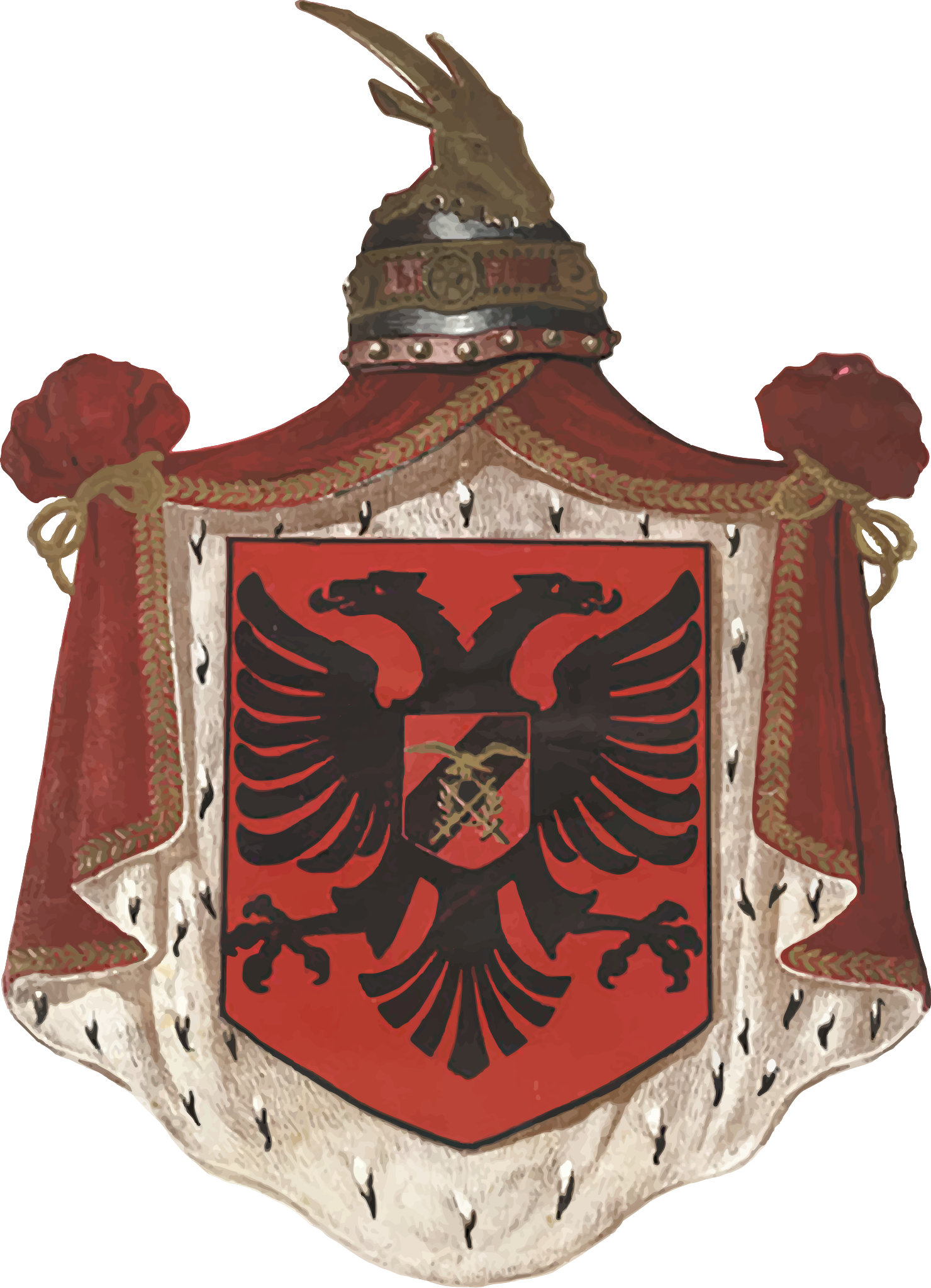
The helmet of Skanderbeg, left; Coat of arms of the Albanian Kingdom (1928–1939), right

During the 1920s the role of religion was downplayed by the Albanian state who instead promoted Albanianism, a broad civic form of nationalism that looked to highlight ethnonational identity over religious identities. In areas such as the Korçë region where Orthodox Albanians became affected by Albanian nationalism they moved away from Orthodox church influence and tended to lose their religious identity, while in areas were the Orthodox population was the majority they often retained their religious identity. The ascension of Ahmet Zog as prime minister (1925) and later king (1929) during the interwar period was marked by limited though necessary political stability. Along with resistance by Zog to interwar Italian political and economic influence in Albania those factors contributed to an environment were an Albanian national consciousness could grow. Under Zog regional affiliations and tribal loyalties were gradually replaced with a developing form of modern nationalism. During that time Zog attempted to instill a national consciousness through the scope of a teleological past based upon Illyrian descent, Skanderbeg's resistance to the Ottomans and the nationalist reawakening (Rilindja) of the 19th and early 20th centuries. The myth of Skanderbeg under Zog was used for nation building purposes and his helmet was adopted in national symbols. Generating mass nationalism was difficult during the interwar period as even in 1939, 80% of Albanians were still illiterate. Apart from using the title King of the Albanians Zog did not pursue irredentist policies such as toward Kosovo due to rivalries with Kosovar Albanian elites and an agreement recognizing Yugoslav sovereignty over Kosovo in return for support. Zog's efforts toward the development of Albanian nationalism made the task simpler for leaders that came after him regarding the process of Albanian state and nation building.

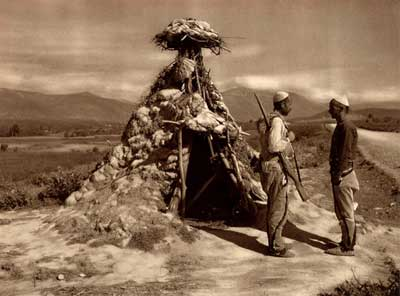
Kosovo Albanian rebels controlling a road in Kosovo, (1920s)

Secessionist sentiments after the First World War became expressed through the Kaçak movement led by the Kosovo Committee made up of Kosovar Albanian exiles opposed to Yugoslav rule. Represented on the ground as a guerilla group in Kosovo and North Macedonia, the Kaçak movement was led by Azem Galica and later his wife Shota Galica that fought a small-scale war (1918–1921) in formations of çetas or fighting bands against the Yugoslav army. Supported by Italy who gave financial aid and Albania, the Kaçak movement was eventually suppressed by the Serbs during the late 1920s. The movement contributed to the development of an Albanian national consciousness in Kosovo and North Macedonia. Yugoslav authorities in the 1930s replaced Albanian imams with ones that were hostile to Sufism from Bosnia weakening Albanian nationalism. Kosovar Albanians were viewed by Yugoslav authorities as an enemy within that could challenge the territorial integrity of the state. Albanians in Kosovo felt that Serbian and later Yugoslav rule constituted a foreign conquest. Confiscations of Albanian land and settlement of Serbian colonists throughout the interwar period drove Kosovar Albanians during the Second World War to collaborate with the Axis powers who promised a Greater Albania.

=== World War II ===
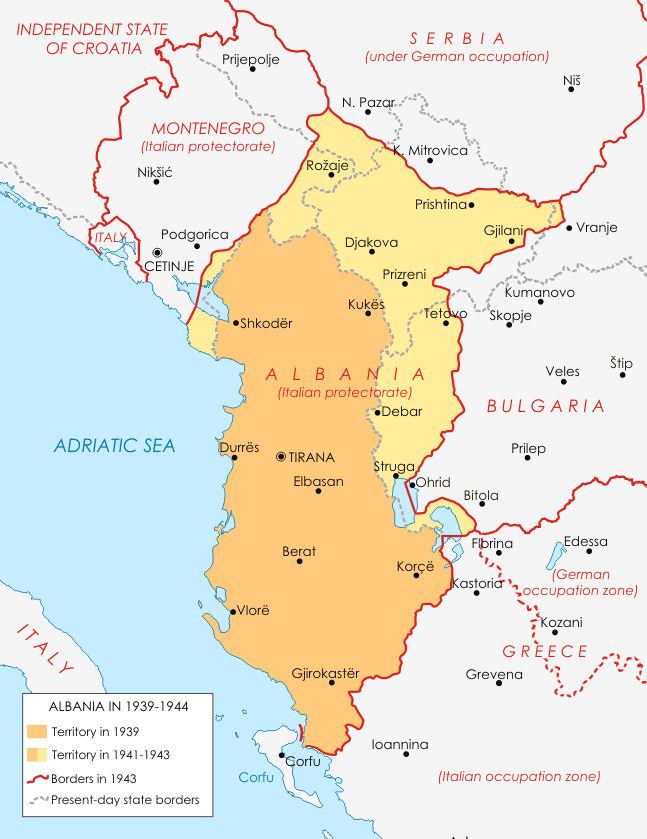
The Italian Protectorate of Albania established by Italy in August 1941.

On 7 April 1939, Italy headed by Benito Mussolini after prolonged interest and overarching sphere of influence during the interwar period invaded Albania. Italian fascist regime members such as Count Galeazzo Ciano pursued Albanian irredentism with the view that it would earn Italians support among Albanians while also coinciding with Italian war aims of Balkan conquest. The Italian annexation of Kosovo to Albania was considered a popular action by Albanians of both areas and initially Kosovar Albanians supported Axis Italian forces. Western North Macedonia was also annexed by Axis Italy to their protectorate of Albania creating a Greater Albania under Italian control. Members from the landowning elite, liberal nationalists opposed to communism with other sectors of society came to form the Balli Kombëtar organisation and the collaborationist government under the Italians which all as nationalists sought to preserve Greater Albania. While Italians expressed increased concerns about conceding authority to them. In time the Italian occupation became disliked by sections of the Albanian population such as the intelligentsia, students, other professional classes and town dwellers that generated further an emerging Albanian nationalism fostered during the Zog years.

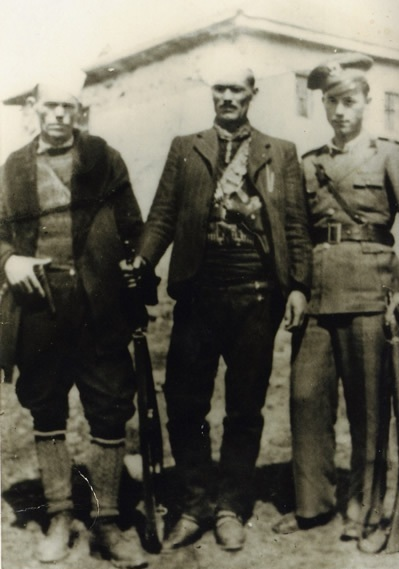
Xhem Hasa (centre) with his brothers, Musli Hasa (left) and Abdullah Hasa (right)

Collapse of Yugoslav rule resulted in actions of revenge being undertaken by Albanians, some joining the local Vulnetari militia that burned Serbian settlements and killed Serbs while interwar Serbian and Montenegrin colonists were expelled into Serbia proper. The aim of these actions were to create a homogeneous Greater Albanian state. Italian authorities in Kosovo and Western North Macedonia allowed the use of Albanian in schools, university education and administration. In Kosovo, western North Macedonia and other newly attached territories to Albania, non-Albanians had to attend Albanian schools that taught a curricula containing nationalism alongside fascism and were made to adopt Albanian forms for their names and surnames. The same nationalist sentiments among Albanians which welcomed the addition of Kosovo and its Albanians within an enlarged state also worked against the Italians as foreign occupation became increasingly rejected. Apart from verbal opposition, other responses to the Italian presence eventually emerged as armed insurrection through the Albanian communist party. Italian authorities had misjudged the growth of an Albanian national consciousness during the Zog years with the assumption that Albanian nationalism was weak or could be directed by the Italians. Regional divisions became heightened when resistance groups with differing agendas emerged in the north and south of Albania which slowed the growth of nationalism. In 1943, Italian control became replaced with German rule and the fiction of an independent Albania was maintained.

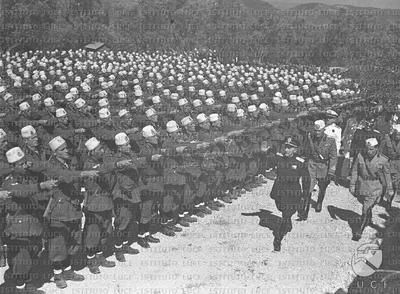
The soldiers of the 11th Legion lined up with their daggers drawn during the oath ceremony

German occupational authorities instigated a policy of threatening the collaborationist government with military action, communist ascendancy or loss of autonomy and Kosovo to keep them in line. The Germans, like the Italians, misunderstood Albanian nationalism; as a result, Albanian non-communists lost credibility while the communist partisans appealed to growing Albanian nationalism. In a post-war setting this meant that groups such as Balli Kombëtar who had aligned with the Axis powers were unable to take power in Albania, while emerging leaders such as communist Enver Hoxha solidified his claim to that role by being a nationalist. Some Albanians in western North Macedonia joined the Balli Kombëtar, most notable being Xhem Hasa who alongside his forces collaborated with the Axis powers on various operations targeting communist Albanian and Macedonian partisans. In 1944 German forces created the SS Skanderbeg division to serve only in Kosovo with Kosovar Albanians as its main recruits and though mass desertions occurred, its members participated in operations against Serbian areas resulting in civilian deaths and pillage while the small Kosovan Jewish community was arrested and deported. An attempt to get Kosovar Albanians to join the resistance, a meeting in Bujan (1943–1944), northern Albania was convened between Balli Kombëtar members and Albanian communists that agreed to common struggle and maintenance of the newly expanded boundaries. The deal was opposed by Yugoslav partisans and later rescinded resulting in limited Kosovar Albanian recruits. Some Balli Kombëtar members such as Shaban Polluzha became partisans with the view that Kosovo would become part of Albania. With the end of the war, some of those Kosovar Albanians felt betrayed by the return of Yugoslav rule and for several years Albanian nationalists in Kosovo resisted both the partisans and later the new Yugoslav army. Albanian nationalists viewed their inclusion within Yugoslavia as an occupation. In Thesprotia, northwestern Greece communal discord between Muslims and Christians dating to the interwar period escalated into conflict during the war. Italian and later German forces made promises of territorial unification with Albania to local Muslim Albanian Chams who supported the Axis powers and some collaborated outright in operations violently targeting local Greeks and Greek identifying Orthodox Albanian speakers that in resulted in their expulsion (1944–1945) by EDES forces into Albania.

=== Albanian Nationalism during the People's Republic of Albania (1945–1991) ===
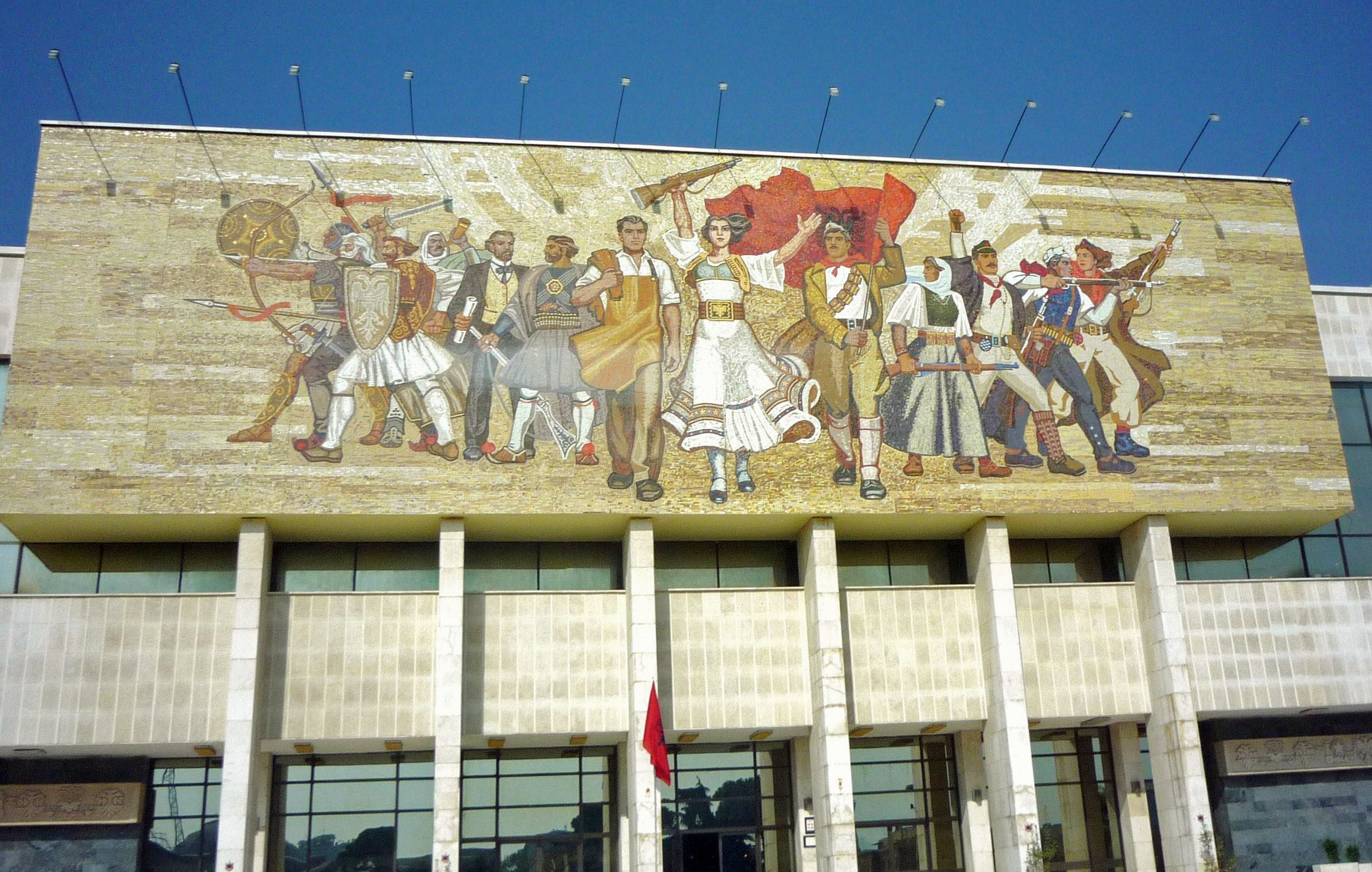
"The Albanians". Communist era mural mosaic depicting purported ancient to modern figures from Albania's history at the entrance of the National History Museum, Tirana

Hoxha emerged as leader of Albania at the end of the war and was left with the task of reconstructing Albania from what foundations remained from the Zog years. Hoxha viewed as his goal the construction of a viable independent Albanian nation state based around a "monolithic unity" of the Albanian people. Albanian society was still traditionally divided between four religious communities. In the Albanian census of 1945, Muslims (Sunni and Bektashi) were 72% of the population, 17.2% were Orthodox and 10% Catholic. The support base of the communist party was small and the need to sideline the Kosovo issue resulted in Hoxha resorting to extreme albeit non-traditional (non irredentist) form of state-nationalism to remain in power and to turn Albania into a Stalinist state. Hoxha implemented widespread education reform aimed at eradicating illiteracy and education which became used to impart the regime's communist ideology and nationalism. In Albania nationalism during communism had as its basis the ideology of Marxism–Leninism. Nationalism became the basis for all of Hoxha's policies as the war created a "state of siege nationalism" imbued with the myth that Albanian military prowess defeated Axis forces which became a centrepiece of the regime within the context of education and culture. Other themes of Hoxha's nationalism included revering Skanderbeg, the League of Prizren meeting (1878), the Alphabet Congress (1908), Albanian independence (1912) and founding father Ismail Qemali, the Italian defeat during the Vlora War (1920) and Hoxha as creator of a new Albania. Hoxha created and generated a cultural environment that was dominated by doctrinal propaganda stressing nationalism in the areas of literature, geography, history, linguistics, ethnology and folklore so people in Albania would have a sense of their past. The effects among people were that it instilled isolationism, xenophobia, slavophobia, linguistic uniformity and ethnic compactness.

==== Origin theories during communism ====
Imitating Stalinist trends in the Communist Bloc, Albania developed its own version of protochronist ideology, which stressed the national superiority and continuity of Albanians from ancient peoples such as the Illyrians. Albanian archaeologists were directed by Hoxha (1960s onward) to follow a nationalist agenda that focused on Illyrians and Illyrian-Albanian continuity with studies published on those topics used as communist political propaganda that omitted mention of Pelasgians. Emphasising an autochthonous ethnogenesis for Albanians, Hoxha insisted on Albanian linguists and archaeologists to connect Albanian with the extinct Illyrian language. The emerging archeological scene funded and enforced by the communist government stressed that the ancestors of the Albanians ruled over a unified and large territory possessing a unique culture. Toward that endeavour Albanian archaeologists also claimed that ancient Greek poleis, ideas, culture were wholly Illyrian and that a majority of names belonging to the Greek deities stemmed from Illyrian words. Albanian publications and television programs (1960s onward) have taught Albanians to understand themselves as descendants of "Indo-European" Illyrian tribes inhabiting the western Balkans from the second to third millennium while claiming them as the oldest indigenous people in that area and on par with the Greeks. Physical anthropologists also tried to demonstrate that Albanians were biologically different from other Indo-European populations, a hypothesis now refuted by genetic analysis.

Nevertheless, regardless of the communist ideology, in current mainstream Albanian and international research most scholars maintain that Albanians descended at least partially from the Illyrians.

==== Nationalism and religion ====
The communist regime through Albanian nationalism attempted to forge a national identity that transcended and eroded religious and other differences with the aim of forming a unitary Albanian identity. The communists promoted the idea that religious feeling, even in a historic context among Albanians was minimal and that instead national sentiment was always important. Albanian communists viewed religion as a societal threat that undermined the cohesiveness of the nation. Within this context religions like Islam and Christianity were denounced as foreign with Muslim and Christian clergy criticised as being socially backward with the propensity to become agents of other states and undermine Albanian interests. Nationalism was also used as a tool by Hoxha during his struggle to break Albania out of the Soviet bloc. Inspired by Pashko Vasa's late 19th century poem for the need to overcome religious differences through Albanian unity, Hoxha took and exploited the stanza "the faith of the Albanians is Albanianism" and implemented it literally as state policy. The communist regime proclaimed that the only religion of the Albanians was Albanianism. In 1967 the communist regime declared Albania the only atheist and non-religious country in the world and banned all forms of religious practice in public. Within the space of several months the communist regime destroyed 2,169 religious buildings (mosques, churches and other monuments) while Muslim and Christian clergy were imprisoned, persecuted and in some cases killed.

==== Name changes ====
Within the context of anti-religion policies the communist regime ordered in 1975 mandatory name changes, in particular surnames for citizens in Albania that were deemed "inappropriate" or "offensive from a political, ideological and moral standpoint". The regime insisted that parents and children attain non religious names that were derived from Albanian mythological figures, geographical features and newly coined names. These names were often ascribed a supposedly "Illyrian" and pagan origin while given names associated with Islam or Christianity were strongly discouraged. Non-Albanian names were replaced which went alongside the state's variant of Albanian nationalism. These approaches resulted for example in the Albanianisation of toponyms in areas where some Slavic minorities resided through official decree (1966) and of Slavic youth though not outright of the Macedonian community as a whole. The communist regime also pursued a nationalistic anti-Greek policy. Greeks in Albania were forced to Albanianise their names and choose ones that did not have ethnic or religious connotations resulting in Greek families giving children different names so as to pass for Albanians in the wider population. Albanian nationalism in the 1980s became an important political factor within the scope of Hoxha's communist doctrines.

== Within Yugoslavia (Kosovo and North Macedonia) ==
During the interwar period and after the Second World War, parts of Kosovar Albanian society lacking Albanian-language education such as those residing in villages were mainly illiterate, and folk music was the main driver of nationalism. The 1950s and 1960s were a period marked by repression and anti Albanian policies in Kosovo under Aleksandar Ranković, a Serbian communist who later fell out and was dismissed by Tito. During this time nationalism for Kosovar Albanians became a conduit to alleviate the conditions of the time. In 1968 Yugoslav Serb officials warned about rising Albanian nationalism and by November unrest and demonstrations by thousands of Albanians followed calling for Kosovo to attain republic status, an independent Albanian-language university and some for unification with Albania. During the 1968 demonstrations, Albanians from Tetovo advocated for the incorporation of Albanian-inhabited regions within the Socialist Republic of Macedonia into Kosovo, forming a unified seventh republic within Yugoslavia. However, authorities dismissed this request and opted instead to authorise revisions to curricula and textbooks, citing the need to address what they perceived as ‘‘The penetration of Albanian nationalistic, irredentist and counter-revolutionary tendencies through printed textbooks and other literature.’’ Tito rewrote the Yugoslav constitution (1974) and attempted to address Albanian grievances by awarding the province of Kosovo autonomy and powers such as a veto in the federal decision-making process similar to that of the republics. Before the dissolution of Yugoslavia, there existed no formal boundary between what later became Kosovo and North Macedonia. A considerable number of Albanians from Tetovo, which served as the unofficial capital for Albanians in North Macedonia, had enrolled at Prishtina University. However, during 1989-1990, the Milosevic regime undertook actions to remove Albanian educators from the university, severing educational ties. Additionally, familial connections between the two regions were significant.

Flag of Albanian minority in SFR Yugoslavia

Between 1971 and 1981, the rise of Albanian nationalism in Kosovo coincided with a revival of Albanian culture that opened new avenues of national expression and awareness that came about when Yugoslavia conceded some cultural and political rights to Kosovar Albanians. The issue of Albanian nationalism in Yugoslavia during this time was left mainly for Kosovar Albanian communists to deal with and they withheld intelligence about activities on some underground organisations from Belgrade. Albanian nationalism in Kosovo is based on the idea of historic rights that Albanians are descendants of ancient Illyrians making them the first population entitled to Kosovo and predating the arrival of Slavs, the ancestors of the Serbs. Scholarship by (patriotic) Kosovar Albanian historians (1970s-onward) revolved around researching and attempting to demonstrate Illyrian-Albanian continuity alongside the precedence of that population in Kosovo and North Macedonia over Serbs and Macedonians. Kosovar Albanian historians also focused on the Second World War partisan struggle and the Albanian contribution to the liberation of Yugoslavia as being proportionate to other nationalities. These arguments were used to justify Albanian claims toward a right to Kosovo and for the Albanian desire to elevate Kosovo as a seventh republic of the Yugoslav federation. Education in Albanian became a source of Albanian nationalism and was confined to Albanian-language texts being inaccessible to non-Albanians while school text books were to some extent nationalistic. Albanian historiography in Albanian-language texts were viewed by critics in Yugoslavia as a root cause of the "indoctrination of the youth" in nationalism.

In 1981 there was an outburst of Albanian nationalism. Prishtina university became a centre for some nationalistically orientated students that generated Kosovar Albanian protests (1981) over social grievances that marked the first large-scale expression of nationalism in Yugoslavia since the Croatian Spring (1971). Kosovar Albanian communists condemned the protests and supported Yugoslav unity while leading the campaign against Albanian nationalism and in that sense shared the view of other Yugoslav communists. The unification of Albanians in the Balkans into one state was also a feature of Kosovar Albanian nationalism and these views were confined to dissident and underground groups. Within the context of the 1981 protests these groups, many with left-wing political orientations united to form the People's Movement of Kosovo (LPRK) in Germany (1982). Unification of Albanians into one state was a demand viewed as separatism and irredentism in Yugoslavia which was banned. Kosovar Albanian nationalists were divided into groups with one that wanted to focus on the Albanian question as a whole and the other mainly focusing on Kosovo. Political dissent by Kosovar Albanians followed resulting in imprisonment and comprising the majority of political prisoners during the 1970s and 1980s. The high birthrate in Kosovo was viewed by Albanians as a way of achieving a pure Kosovo by outnumbering local Serbs while communist politicians held the view that Albanian irredentists were attempting to rid Kosovo of Serbs. In the 1970s and 1980s, sentiments of Albanian nationalism had spread from Kosovo to North Macedonia worrying Macedonian communist authorities which resulted in measures of state sociopolitical control over Albanian cultural and linguistic affairs suppressing expressions of Albanian nationalism in a campaign referred to as differentiation.

=== Dissidence and rise of nationalism ===
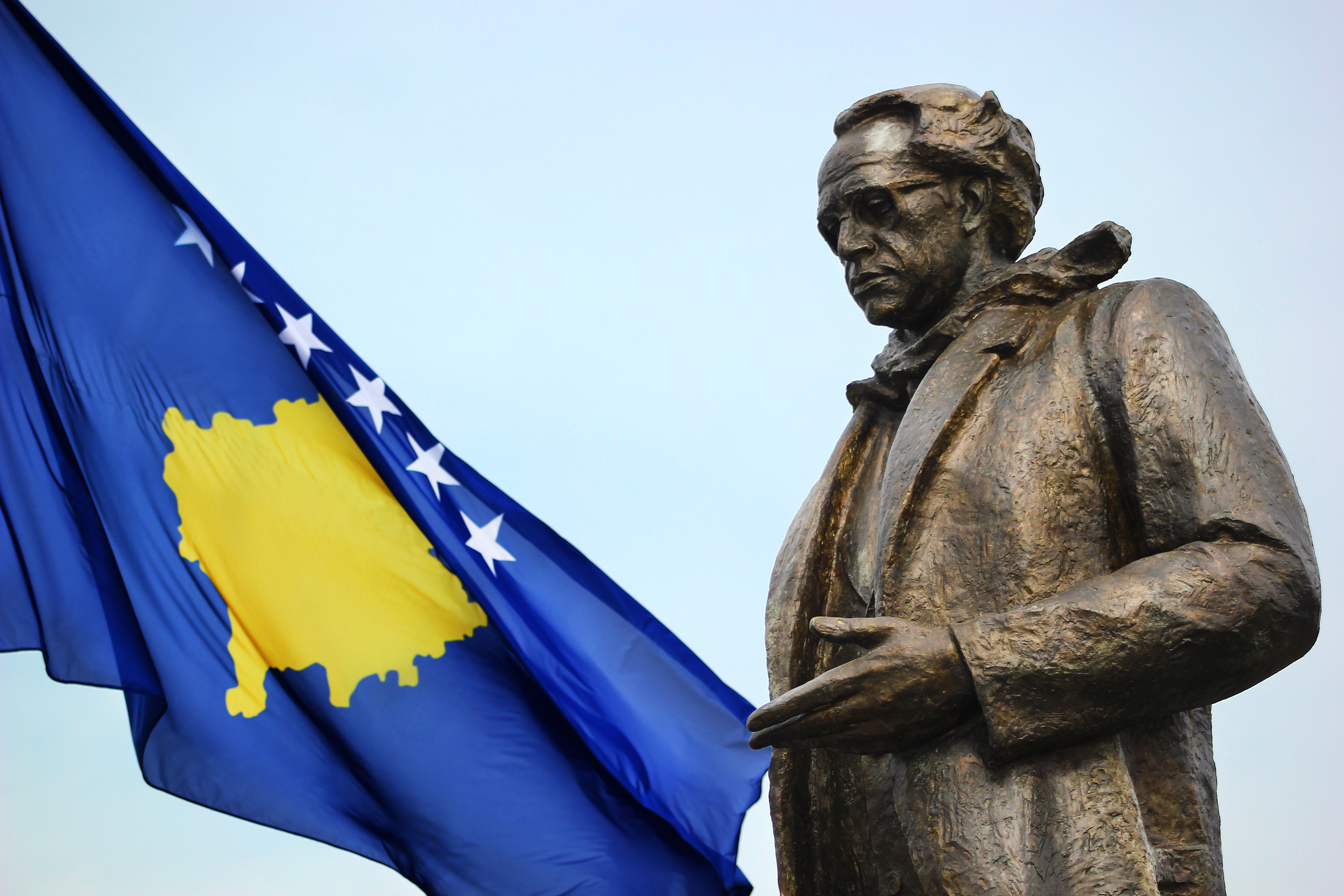
Statue of Ibrahim Rugova, Prishtina

Repression of Albanian nationalism and Albanian nationalists by authorities in Belgrade strengthened the independence movement and focused international attention toward the plight of Kosovar Albanians. The recentralisation of Yugoslavia was promoted due to events in Kosovo, while Serbian nationalism within cultural institutions and the media gained strength. Expressions of Albanian national identity were perceived as overwhelmingly anti-Yugoslav and increasingly anti-Serb. Within that context Albanian-language education was viewed as threatening Serbian borders and sovereignty and was identified with Albanian nationalism. By 1989 the degree of autonomy that Kosovo had attained within Yugoslavia was rescinded by Serbian leader Slobodan Milosević. Albanian nationalists created a non-governmental organisation called the Democratic League of Kosovo (LDK) that also gained many dissatisfied Kosovar Albanian communists who joined its ranks after autonomy was rescinded. It was led by the intellectual Ibrahim Rugova who began a period of pacifist resistance and the league created a parallel form of government and civil society while maintaining as its goal to achieve an independent Kosovo. The Kosovo education system became the place where Serbian and Albanian nationalisms played out their conflict. Serbs asserted control of the education system, while educational opportunities for Albanians became limited as they were excluded from university and schools. This prompted Kosovar Albanians to establish a parallel education system where private homes served as schools. Albanian students became immersed in nationalist culture by learning an Albanian history of Kosovo and were no longer exposed to Yugoslav "Brotherhood and Unity" era principles and to learning the Serbian language.

=== Late 1980s and early 1990s ===
Logo of the KLA

Kosovar Albanian national identity making unique claims to Kosovo became homogenised during the 1990s and included multiple factors that led to those developments. Of those were Albanian civil disobedience and popular resistance, the creation of a parallel society in opposition to the Serb state and some underground cells initiating conflict which in all was a reaction to Serbian government policies and repression. From the late 1980s onward Islam within the scope of Albanian identity was downplayed by many Kosovar Albanian intellectual and political figures while Christianity was promoted as a Western marker of "European identity". Post-communism, Kosovo Albanians alongside Albanians in Macedonia became the main force steering Albanian nationalism, while Islam did not become a main focal point in articulating Albanian political nationalism. Islam was not a significant factor in the recent political mobilization of Kosovar Albanian Muslims who joined with Catholic Albanians during their struggle against the Serbs. In addition to the risk of conflict spreading to Kosovo, there were reports of weapons being illicitly transported into newly independent Republic of Macedonia, where there was widespread concern about the potential escalation of hostilities. Along the western border with Albania, the ethnic Albanian minority increasingly expressed dissatisfaction with their marginalised status. Electing a new assertive leadership in Tetovo, regarded as the de facto Albanian capital, they aimed to protest perceived human rights violations through large-scale street demonstrations. the familial links, shared history and rising pan-Albanian popular sympathy for the Kosovar Albanians and the Macedonian Albanians, strengthened the idea of a Greater Albania among these communities.

During these years Rugova as elected president by Albanians promoted an Albanian identity that stressed their Europeanness and antiquity, in particular one based on ancient Dardania. With the Kosovo issue sidelined at the Dayton Peace Accords (1995) ending the dissolution of Yugoslavia, more militant and younger voices disillusioned with Rugova's pacifism dominated like the Kosovo Liberation Army (founded 1992) that began attacks against Serbian forces. The KLA had emerged from the LPRK as many of its members belonged to the political movement. As its founding goal was to unite Albanian inhabited lands in the Balkans into a Greater Albania, the ideological underpinnings of the KLA were overwhelmingly that of Albanian nationalism stressing Albanian culture, ethnicity and nation. Post-independence, a referendum was held in Albanian majority western North Macedonia for autonomy and binational state federalisation of which some Albanian politicians from Tetovo and Struga declared the Republic of Ilirida (1991–1992) aiming to unite all Yugoslav Albanians into one entity.

=== Kosovo conflict (1990s) and Kosovan independence (2000s) ===
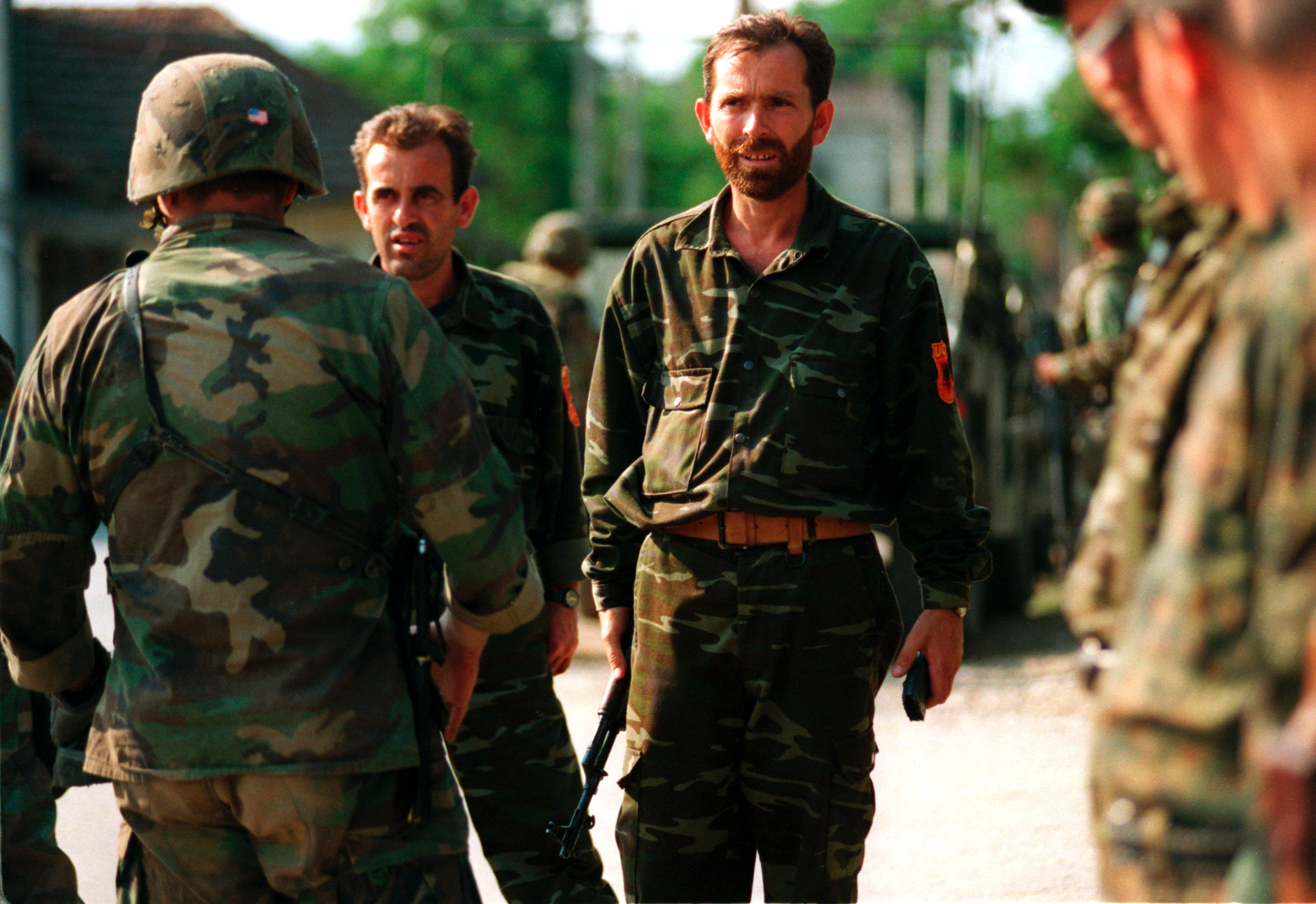
Two Kosovo Liberation Army members (background) with US marine (foreground), 1999

Conflict escalated from 1997 onward due to the Yugoslavian army retaliating with a crackdown in the region resulting in violence and population displacements. Myths of first settlement and Illyrian descent served to justify for Kosovar Albanians the independence struggle seen as one to eventually unite Albanian lands into a unitary state recreating the mythical state of Illyicum encompassing contemporary Balkan Albanian inhabited lands. A shootout at the Jashari family compound involving Adem Jashari, a KLA commander and surrounding Yugoslav troops in 1998 resulted in the massacre of most Jashari family members. The event became a rallying myth for KLA recruitment regarding armed resistance to Serb forces. By 1999 international interest in Kosovo eventuated into war resulting in NATO intervention against Milosević, ethnic cleansing of thousands of Albanians driving them into neighbouring countries with the cessation of conflict marking the withdrawal of Yugoslav forces. Many people from non-Albanian communities such as the Serbs and Romani fled Kosovo fearing revenge attacks by armed people and returning refugees while others were pressured by the KLA and armed gangs to leave. Post conflict Kosovo was placed under an international United Nations framework with the UN Interim Administration Mission in Kosovo (UNMIK) overseeing administrative affairs and the UN Kosovo Force (KFOR) dealing with defence.

== Contemporary Albanian Nationalism in the Balkans ==
=== Albania ===
Due to the legacy of Hoxha's dictatorial and violent regime, Albanians in a post-communist environment have rejected Hoxha's version of Albanian nationalism. Instead it has been replaced with a weak form of civic nationalism and regionalism alongside in some instances with a certain anti-nationalism that has inhibited the construction of an Albanian civil society. Post-communist Albanian governments view the tenets of the Albanian National Awakening as being a guiding influence for Albania by placing the nation above sociopolitical and religious differences and steering the country toward Euro-Atlantic integration. Themes and concepts of history from the Zog and later Hoxha era have still continued to be modified and adopted within a post communist environment to fit contemporary Albania's aspirations regarding Europe. Trends from Albanian nationalist historiography composed by scholars during and of the communist era onward linger on that interpret Ottoman rule as being the "yoke" period, akin to other Balkan historiographies. The legacy of understanding history through such dichotomies has remained for a majority of Albanians which for example they view Skanderbeg and the anti-Ottoman forces as "good" while the Ottomans are "bad". The Albanian government depicts Skanderbeg as a leader of the Albanian resistance to the Ottomans and creator of an Albanian centralised state without emphasizing his Christian background. Figures from the Muslim community such as state founder Ismail Qemali is revered by the government and viewed by Albanians as a defender of the nation though their religious background has been sidelined. The figure of Saint Mother Teresa, an Albanian nun known for missionary activities in India has been used for nationalist purposes in Albania, Kosovo and Macedonia. Within Albania she is promoted inside and outside Albania by the political elite as an Albanian symbol of the West to enhance the country's international status regarding Euro-Atlantic aspirations and integration.

==== Influence of origin theories in contemporary society and politics ====
Within the sphere of Albanian politics, the Illyrians are officially regarded as the ancestors of the Albanians. The Illyrian theory continues to influence Albanian nationalism, scholarship, and archeologists as it is seen as providing some evidence of continuity of an Albanian presence in Kosovo, western Macedonia, and southern Albania, i.e., areas that were subject to ethnic conflicts between Albanians, Serbs, Macedonians, and Greeks. For some Albanian nationalists claiming descent from Illyrians as the oldest inhabitants of the Western Balkans allows them to assert a "prior claim" to sizeable lands in the Balkans. In the context of the so-called authochtony theory, Albanian scholars reject any resemblances of Mycenaean Greek burial patterns found in Albania during the Late Bronze Age as coincidental or non-existent. Though archaeological and linguistic evidence points that Illyrians had not a homogeneous ethnic entity, even today this is challenged in local scholarship. Greek and Roman figures from antiquity such as Aristotle, Pyrrhus of Epirus, Alexander the Great, and Constantine the Great are also claimed.

Ismail Kadare, a prominent Albanian novelist, has reflected in his writings themes from nationalistic Albanian historiography about Albanian closeness to ancient Greeks based on Homeric ideals, claiming that the Albanians are more Greek than the Greeks themselves. He has initiated debates on Albanian identity, saying that Albanians are a white people and Islam has been the result of foreign invasions.

Rejected by modern scholarship, during the late 1990s and early 2000s the Pelasgian theory has been revived through a series of translated foreign books published on Albania and other related topics and plays an important role in Albanian nationalism today. Among them are authors Robert D'Angély, Edwin Everett Jacques, Mathieu Aref and Aristeidis Kollias, whose works have revitalised 19th century ideas about Albanian descent from ancient Pelasgians (shared with the Greeks) and being a European "white race" originating from them alongside many Greek words having an Albanian etymology. In Albania the Pelasgian theory has been used by Albanians in Albania and Albanian immigrants in Greece as a tool to rehabilitate themselves as an ancient and autochthonous population in the Balkans to "prove" the precedence of Albanians over Greeks. The revival of the alternative Pelasgian theory has occurred within the context of post-communist Greek-Albanian relations to generate cultural hegemony and historical precedence over the Greeks and sometimes toward other (historical) European cultures by Albanians. Albanian schoolbooks, mainly in relation to language, have also asserted at times that the Illyrians are the heirs of the Pelasgians.

=== Kosovo and North Macedonia ===
Official flag of the Kosovan President designed by Ibrahim Rugova.

The Kosovo war (1999) generated enthusiasm for using the internet among Balkan Albanians and diaspora (Europe and North America) for information and communication between communities separated by borders and geography and cyberspace has increasingly become an ethno-political space where Albanian irredentists promote Greater Albania through content like maps on websites. In post conflict Kosovo Rugova as first president in his drive toward emphasising aspects of statehood spent time researching and pursued an identity management project that centred on ancient Dardania and designed state symbols like the presidential flag for a future independent Kosovo. Some Kosovar Albanians have referred to Kosovo as Dardania and Rugova at times supported those moves. To define Kosovo as an Albanian area, a toponyms commission (1999) led by Kosovar Albanian academics was established to determine new or alternative names for some settlements, streets, squares and organisations with Slavic origins that underwent a process of Albanisation during this period. Those measures have been promoted by sectors of the Kosovar Albanian academic, political, literary and media elite that caused administrative and societal confusion with multiple toponyms being used resulting in sporadic acceptance by wider Kosovar Albanian society.

In Kosovo, Albanians view themselves as being the oldest nation in the Balkans and descendants of the ancient Illyrians with their self-determination struggle being interpreted as one of first settlers in the area fighting against the Slavic Serb "interlopers". Serbs are regarded by Albanian nationalists in generalised terms as "Slavs" and view them without historic territorial rights within an expanded Albanian state. In Kosovo, the additional Dardanian-Illyrian theory also exists that claims contemporary Kosovar Albanians as direct descendants of Dardanians, a subgroup of the Illyrian people who inhabited the area in antiquity. The Dardanians are viewed by Kosovar Albanians as having been Catholics and interpreted as making Albanians historically part of Western civilisation in opposition to the Slavs who are alleged to have taken Catholic churches and converted them into Orthodox ones. The myth has impacted the struggle for Kosovan self-determination from the Serbs in that an independent Kosovo is viewed separate from Albania and as a recovery and recreation of the ancient Dardanian kingdom. Albanian unification has however been interpreted by Kosovar Albanians in the context of reuniting ancient Dardanians into a larger Illyrian whole or modern Albanians of Kosovo into a Greater Albania. The myth has also served to justify expulsion and dispossession of the perceived enemy understood as either temporary or hostile occupiers. A strong link exists in Kosovo for Albanians between nationalist politics and archaeology. Kosovar Albanian archaeologists continue to attempt through archeological excavations and their interpretations to connect Kosovar Albanians with the local ancient Dardanian and Illyrian populations.

In 2004, prolonged negotiations over Kosovo's future status, sociopolitical problems and nationalist sentiments resulted in the Kosovo riots. Organised and spontaneous acts of violence and damage by Kosovar Albanians was directed at properties of the Serbs, their churches and the Romani leaving some dead and many displaced. International legal precedents based on territorial sovereignty overriding self-determination were brushed aside in the case of Kosovo when parts of the international community recognised the declaration of Kosovan independence (2008). This was put down to fears that not doing so would result in Albanian nationalism possibly making the situation difficult and worse for the international community in Kosovo had conflict eventuated. Albanian nationalism is viewed in the Balkans as having furthered events in Kosovo which has caused concerns about the phenomenon of nationalism and generated fears among Serbs, Croats, Macedonians, Romanians and Bulgarians. The ending of the Kosovo war resulted in the emergence of offshoot guerilla groups and political organisations from the KLA continuing various violent struggles. In the Preševo valley the Liberation Army of Preševo, Medveđa and Bujanovac (UÇPMB) fought Serb forces (1999–2001) attempting to unite the area with neighbouring Kosovo with conflict ending in peace talks and greater Albanian rights in Serbia. In northern parts of the Republic of Macedonia the National Liberation Army (NLA) fought against Macedonian forces (2001) with conflict ending in peace talks and the signing of the Ohrid Agreement granting greater Albanian rights in Macedonia.

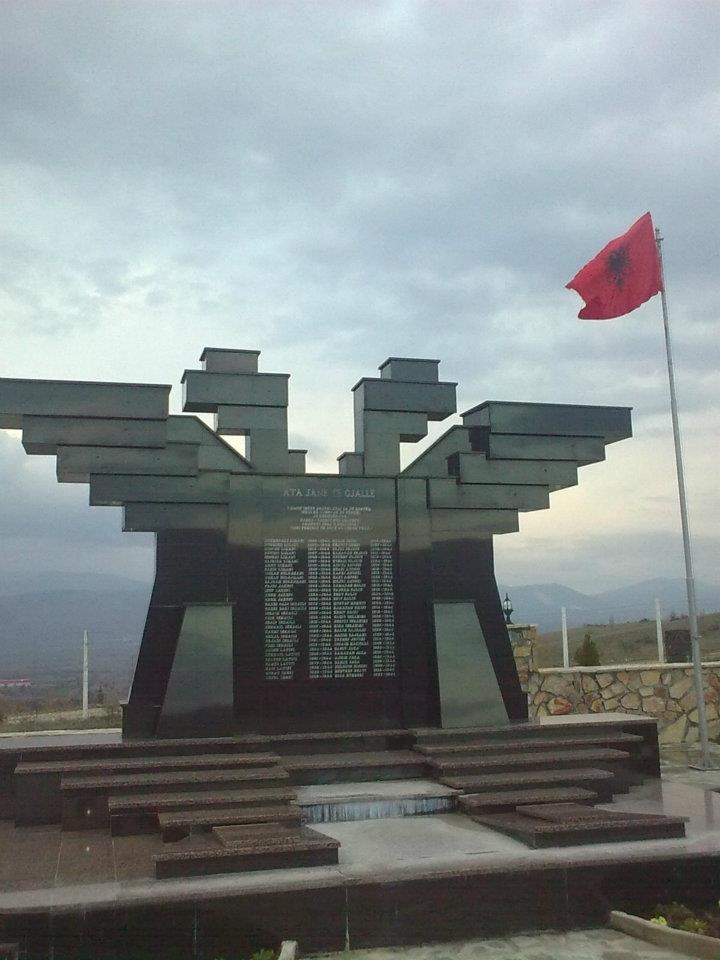
Monument to fallen NLA fighters, Sopot

Post conflict, Albanians in Macedonia have placed new statues of Albanian historical figures like Skanderbeg in Skopje and named schools after such individuals while memorials have been erected for fallen KLA and NLA fighters. Albanian nationalists view Macedonian ethnicity as invented by the Yugoslavs to weaken Serbia, prevent other identities forming and to legitimise the existence of Republic of Macedonia in Yugoslavia. Macedonians are referred to by (nationalist) Albanians as an ethnic collectivity with the term Shkie (Slavs) that also carries pejorative connotations. Albanian nationalists view Macedonians as being without historic territorial rights over areas in Macedonia that would become part of a Greater Albania and lay claim to half of the territory of the republic. In the political sphere Albanian parties maintain secular and nationalistic platforms while supporting the secular framework of the state with an insistence on protecting Islam and the culture of Muslim constituents along with control and interference of Muslim institutions. Unlike Albania and Kosovo, national identity and Islam are traditionally linked and stronger among Albanians from Macedonia. The status of Albanians being a minority in Macedonia and that most are Muslims have blended national and religious identity in opposition to the Orthodox Slavic Macedonian majority. Some Muslim Albanian establishment figures in Macedonia hold that view that being a good Muslim is synonymous with being Albanian.

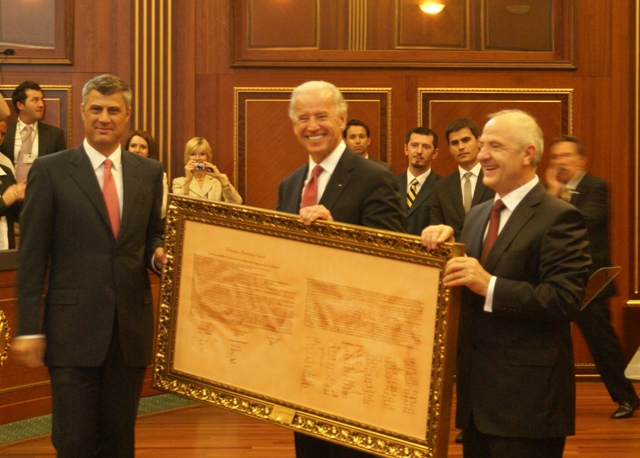
Prime Minister Hashim Thaçi (left), U.S. Vice President Joe Biden (centre) and President Fatmir Sejdiu (right) with Kosovo Declaration of Independence, 2009

In post conflict Kosovo KLA fighters have been venerated by Kosovar Albanian society with the publishing of literature such as biographies, the erection of monuments and sponsoring of commemorative events. The exploits of Adem Jashari have been celebrated and turned into legend by former KLA members, some in government, and by Kosovar Albanian society resulting in songs, literature, monuments, memorials with streets and buildings bearing his name across Kosovo. In the context of de-emphasising Islam, Kosovar Albanians have shown interest in and referred to Albanian Christian origins and heritage, in particular the Laramans (Kosovan crypto-Catholics) assisted to present Albanians as originally European despite being Muslim. Old Albanian traditions within the Drenica region hailing as a local the medieval Serb figure Miloš Obilić (Albanian: Millosh Kopiliq) who killed Sultan Murad I have been utilised within Kosovo school textbooks and by some Albanian nationalists to claim the knight as an Albanian. Establishing the participation of Albanians at the Battle of Kosovo has been a means for Kosovar Albanians to claim roots of being European and to sideline the historic conversion to Islam. Within the context of the Kosovo battle and nation building, some in government circles and wider Kosovo Albanian society have promoted a narrative of continuous Albanian resistance from medieval until contemporary times to states and peoples considered foreign occupiers. With the declaration of independence (2008), the Kosovo government has promoted the country both internally and internationally as Newborn generating an ideology that attempts to break with the past and establish a democratic multicultural future. Albanian nationalism in Kosovo is secular while Islam is mainly subsumed within the parameters of national and cultural identity that entails at times dominant clan and familial identities. Within the public sphere Islam at times resurfaces to challenge the dominant nationalistic view of Albanians being superficial Muslims however the political sphere remains mainly secular.

== Pan-Albanianism and Albanian politics in the Balkans ==
Political parties advocating and willing to fight for a Greater Albania emerged in Albania during the 2000s. They were the National Liberation Front of Albanians (KKCMTSH) and Party of National Unity (PUK) that both merged in 2002 to form the United National Albanian Front (FBKSh) which acted as the political organisation for the Albanian National Army (AKSh) militant group. Regarded internationally as terrorist both have gone underground and its members have been involved in various violent incidents in Kosovo, Serbia and Macedonia during the 2000s. In the early 2000s, the Liberation Army of Chameria (UCC) was a reported paramilitary formation that intended to be active in northern Greek region of Epirus. Political parties active only in the political scene exist that have a nationalist outlook are the monarchist Legality Movement Party (PLL), the National Unity Party (PBKSh) alongside the Balli Kombëtar, a party to have passed the electoral threshold and enter parliament. These political parties, some of whom advocate for a Greater Albania have been mainly insignificant and remained at the margins of the Albanian political scene. Another nationalist party to have passed the electoral threshold is the Party for Justice, Integration and Unity (PDIU) representing the Cham Albanian community regarding property and other issues related to their Second World War exile from northern Greece. The current socialist prime minister Edi Rama in coalition with the PDIU has raised the Cham issue, while at PDIU gatherings made comments about ancient Greek deities and references to surrounding territories as being Albanian earning stern rebukes from Greece. Some similar views have also been voiced by members from Albania's political elite from time to time. Within the sphere of Albanian politics anti-Greek sentiments exist and have for instance been expressed by the nationalist movement turned political party the Red and Black Alliance (AK). Anti-Greek sentiments expressed as conspiracy theories among Albanians are over perceived fears of hellenisation of Albanians through economic incentives creating a "time-bomb" by artificially raising Greek numbers alongside Greek irredentism toward Southern Albania. There are conspiracy theories in which the identification with Greek expansionist plans would classify them as potential enemies of the state. Some Albanians are in favour of Albania being more self-assertive and having a more ethnonationalist strategy toward the "Greek issue".

Official ensign of the Albanian National Army

The Kosovo question has limited appeal among Albanian voters and are not interested in electing parties advocating redrawn borders creating a Greater Albania. Centenary Albanian independence celebrations in 2012 generated nationalistic commentary among the political elite of whom prime-minister Sali Berisha referred to Albanian lands as extending from Preveza (in northern Greece) to Preševo (in southern Serbia), angering Albania's neighbors. In Kosovo, a prominent left wing nationalist movement turned political party Vetëvendosje (Self Determination) has emerged who advocates for closer Kosovo-Albania relations and pan-Albanian self-determination in the Balkans. Another smaller nationalist party, the Balli Kombetar Kosovë (BKK) sees itself as an heir to the original Second World War organization that supports Kosovan independence and pan-Albanian unification. Catholic and Orthodox Albanians hold concerns that any possible unification of Balkan areas populated by sizable amounts of Albanian Muslims to the country would lead to an increasing "Muslimization" of Albania. The ambiguity of Islam, its place and role among Balkan (Muslim) Albanians, especially in Albania and Kosovo has limited the ability of it becoming a major component to advance the cause of Great Albania. During the Kosovo crisis (1999) Albania was divided between two positions. The first being an Albanian nationalism motivating Albania to aid and provide refuge for Kosovar Albanian refugees while being a conduit for arming Kosovar Albanians and the second that the country was unable to provide those resources, aid and asylum. Greater Albania remains mainly in the sphere of political rhetoric and overall Balkan Albanians view EU integration as the solution to combat crime, weak governance, civil society and bringing different Albanian populations together. In the 2000s onward polling data on Kosovo-Albania unification has waned among Kosovans with support for an independent Kosovo being overwhelming (90.2%) indicating that alongside their Albanian identity a new Kosovan identity has emerged. This factor has been strongly disliked by Albanian nationalists.

However, Albanian nationalism remains popular, with Kosovar Albanians at present supporting the "two states, one nation" platform. This ensures a sustainable Kosovo state, outside of Serbian and foreign control, and a united internal and external front between Kosovo and Albania. Recently, Kosovo's and Albania's governments have signed numerous treaties and memorandums of cooperation which synchronise their policies at home and abroad, including in the diaspora, to create a Pan-Albanian approach without the need for ground unification. The rise of Vetevendosje in Kosovo has further cemented Albanian nationalism and pride within the country, as has a lack of EU integration which has pushed Kosovars to supporting a direct Kosovo-Albania unification to combat isolation, such as with visa liberalisation. Gallup surveys between 2008 and 2013 showed 73% of Kosovo Albanians wanted a union with Albania, with independence support being at high over being a part of Serbia. In 2009, one year after Kosovo declared independence, support for Kosovo-Albania unification increased to 77%. Today, Kosovo Albanians see Kosovo as the second Albanian state and unification thus being achieved, yet Albanian loyalty remains higher than loyalty to the new Kosovar/Kosovan state (primarily symbols), as seen with support for the use of the Flag of Albania.
