= Red and Black Alliance =

Political party in Albania

Red and Black Alliance Aleanca Kuq e Zi
- Leader: Lumturi Ratkoceri
- Secretary-General: Redi Ramaj
- Spokesperson: Shkelzen Neza
- Founder: Kreshnik Spahiu
- Founded: March 20, 2012
- Headquarters: Tirana, Albania
- Youth wing: Aleanca Rinore Kuq e Zi
- Ideology: Albanian nationalism Greater Albania
- Political position: Far-right
- Slogan: "Zoti është i pari, Shqipëria mbi të gjitha." (God is first, Albania above all.)
- National Assembly: 0 / 140
- Municipality: 0 / 65
- Communes: 0 / 309

Election symbol
- AK

Website
- www.aleancakuqezi.al

The Red and Black Alliance (Albanian: Aleanca Kuq e Zi) is a nationalist political party in Albania. It was created by Kreshnik Spahiu, the former Deputy Head of the High Council of Justice of Albania. It has sometimes been described as ultra-nationalist. It is the first nationalist/far right party in Albania to be led by a woman, Lumturi Ratkoceri.

== History ==
On March 20,2012 the Alliance turned into a political party.

On January 8, 2013, the Alliance requested permission from the Central Election Commission of Albania to hold a referendum for the union of Albania with Kosovo.

On that same date the Alliance denounced to the Law enforcement authorities of Albania the member of parliament Spiro Ksera, current Minister of Labor, Social Affairs and Equal Opportunities of Albania, for anti national activities, connections with the Greek extremist party of Golden Dawn, and for having employed as a counselor Theofan Kaliviotis, an Albania-born ethnic Greek, who is the head of the irredentist movement for the Independence of Northern Epirus from Albania.

== Chairmen of AK ==
Person	Period
Lumturi Ratkoceri	2017–present

== See also ==
- Vetëvendosje!
