= Southeast European Times =

Southeast European Times was a United States European Command-sponsored news website dedicated to coverage of Southeast Europe that ended publication in March 2015. The countries covered included Albania, Bosnia-Herzegovina, Bulgaria, Croatia, Greece, Montenegro, North Macedonia, Romania, Serbia, and Turkey.

The primary address of the website was setimes.com, though it was also available under the addresses: balkan-info.com and balkantimes.com. It started online as Balkan-Info in October 1999, as Balkan Times in May 2001 and finally as SETimes in October 2002.

The content of the website was available in ten languages: Albanian, Bosnian, Bulgarian, Croatian, English, Greek, Macedonian, Romanian, Serbian, Russian and Turkish.
