= Mark Laity =

British NATO spokesperson and news correspondent

Mark F. Laity (born 1955 in Truro, Cornwall, UK) is a NATO spokesman and former BBC correspondent. He gained a BA(hons) and MA from the University of York. Laity later became a Senior Associate Research Fellow at the Centre for Defence Studies, at King's College London.

Laity became a Defence Correspondent from 1989 until 2000. During the first Gulf War, in 1990–91, he was based in Saudi Arabia and became a frequent voice on BBC radio. He covered later conflicts also - particularly the break-up of Yugoslavia, the war in Bosnia and the conflict with Serbia over Kosovo, where he reported from NATO's Brussels headquarters, before reporting from Kosovo itself. Laity commented on NATO actions in Afghanistan, and became Chief Strategic Communications at the Supreme Headquarters Allied Powers Europe.

In 2003 Laity formally complained to the BBC about comments made to the Hutton Inquiry, which he interpreted as a slight on his tenure as Defence Correspondent.
