= High Council of Justice (Albania) =

National council of the judiciary, 1992–2017

Albania Këshilli i Lartë i Drejtësisë
- Official logo

Advice organ overview
- Formed: April 1992
- Dissolved: April 2017
- Jurisdiction: Albania
- Headquarters: Tirana
- Website: www.kld.al

The High Council of Justice (KLD) (Albanian: Këshilli i Lartë i Drejtësisë) was a constitutional authority and the national council of the judiciary of Albania, headed by the President.

The council was established in April 1992, following changes in the country's constitutional provisions. It tries to maintain balance in the Albanian legal system. Its activities are predicated by the current Constitution in Section 9 thereof, while the structure is determined primarily by Article 147.

The KLD was dissolved in April 2017 following the entry into force of the new justice reform, which took place in the country. In December 2018, the High Council of Prosecutors and the High Judicial Council were formed, which would take many of the KLD's powers.

== See also ==
- Cabinet of Albania
