= Albanian nationalism in Albania =

Ideology in Albania proper

Albanian nationalism in Albania emerged during the 19th century. The onset of the Great Eastern Crisis (1870s) that threatened partition of Balkan Albanian inhabited lands by neighbouring Orthodox Christian states stimulated the emergence of the Albanian national awakening (Rilindja) and nationalist movement. During the 19th century, some Western scholarly influences, Albanian diasporas such as the Arbëreshë and Albanian National Awakening figures contributed greatly to spreading influences and ideas among Balkan Albanians within the context of Albanian self-determination. Among those were ideas of an Illyrian contribution to Albanian ethnogenesis which still dominate Albanian nationalism in contemporary times and other ancient peoples claimed as ancestors of the Albanians, in particular the Pelasgians of which have been claimed again in recent times.

Due to overlapping and competing territorial claims with other Balkan nationalisms and states over land dating from the late Ottoman period, these ideas comprise a national myth that establishes precedence over neighboring peoples (Slavs and Greeks) and allow movements for independence and self-determination, as well as irredentist claims against neighboring countries. Pan-Albanian sentiments are also present and historically have been achieved only once when part of Kosovo and western Macedonia was united by Axis Italian forces to their protectorate of Albania during the Second World War. Albanian nationalism contains a series of myths relating to Albanian origins, cultural purity and national homogeneity, religious indifference as the basis of Albanian national identity, and continuing national struggles. The figure of Skanderbeg is one of the main constitutive myths of Albanian nationalism that is based on a person, as other myths are based on ideas, abstract concepts, and collectivism. These ideas and concepts were further developed during the interwar period under Ahmet Zog and later the Socialist People's Republic of Albania (1945–1991), which mainly focused on Illyrian-Albanian continuity in addition to reinterpreting certain ancient renowned figures and history as Albanian. In a post communist environment, Albanian National Awakening values, ideas and concepts that were enforced, developed further and expanded during Enver Hoxha's regime are still somewhat present within Albanian society and politics that have been reinterpreted within the context of Euro-Atlantic integration.

== Ottoman period: Development of Albanian Nationalism during National Albanian Awakening ==
=== Background ===
Flag of Albania

Albanian nationalism, unlike its Greek and Serbian counterparts has its origins in a different historical context that did not emerge from an anti-Ottoman struggle and instead dates to the period of the Eastern Crisis (1878) and threat of territorial partition by Serbs and Greeks. Competing with neighbours for contested areas forced Albanians to make their case for nationhood and seek support from European powers. Those events were a pivotal moment that led to the emergence of myths being generated that became part of the mythology of Albanian nationalism that is expressed in contemporary times within Albanian collective culture and memory. That historical context also made the Albanian national movement defensive in outlook as nationalists sought national affirmation and to counter what they viewed as the erosion of national sentiments and language. By the 19th century Albanians were divided into three religious groups. Catholic Albanians had some Albanian ethno-linguistic expression in schooling and church due to Austro-Hungarian protection and Italian clerical patronage. Orthodox Albanians fell under the authority of the Constantinople Patriarchate, which controlled the Orthodox schools and churches, using only the Greek language for instruction and worship. Muslim Albanians during this period formed around 70% of the overall Balkan Albanian population in the Ottoman Empire with an estimated population of more than a million. Albanian schools had been prohibited by the Ottoman Porte and contrasted by the Constantinople Patriarchate and local Greek clercs as they feared that educated Albanians could contribute to the Albanian national consciusness.

The Albanian nation building project drew upon a sort of proto-national consciousnesses based on ethnic and linguistic elements that existed prior to 1800 and transformed it into a political and national movement in the 19th century.

Just as we are not and do not want to be Turks, so we shall oppose with all our might anyone who would like to turn us into Slavs or Austrians or Greeks, we want to be Albanians.

— Excerpt from the League of Prizren memorandum to the British delegation at the Berlin Congress, 1878,

.

O moj Shqypni (Oh Albania)
"Albanians, you are killing kinfolk,
You're split in a hundred factions,
Some believe in God or Allah,
Say "I'm Turk," or "I am Latin,"
Say "I'm Greek," or "I am Slavic,"
But you're brothers, hapless people!
You have been duped by priests and hodjas
To divide you, keep you wretched....
Who has the heart to let her perish,
Once a heroine, now so weakened!
Well-loved mother, dare we leave her
To fall under foreign boot heels ?...
Wake, Albanian, from your slumber,
Let us, brothers, swear in common
And not look to church or mosque,
The Albanian's faith is Albanianism [to be Albanian]!

— Excerpt from O moj Shqypni by Pashko Vasa, 1878.

=== Eastern Crisis and Albanian National Awakening ===
With the rise of the Eastern Crisis, Muslim Albanians became torn between loyalties to the Ottoman state and the emerging Albanian nationalist movement. Islam, the Sultan and the Ottoman Empire were traditionally seen as synonymous in belonging to the wider Muslim community. The Albanian nationalist movement advocated self-determination and strived to achieve socio-political recognition of Albanians as a separate people and language within the state. Albanian nationalism was a movement that began among Albanian intellectuals without popular demand from the wider Albanian population. Geopolitical events pushed Albanian nationalists, many Muslim, to distance themselves from the Ottomans, Islam and the then emerging pan-Islamic Ottomanism of Sultan Abdulhamid II. Responding to the Eastern crisis and possible partition, a group of Albanian intellectuals created the League of Prizren to resist neighbouring foreign Balkan states and to assert an Albanian national consciousness by uniting Albanians into a unitary linguistic and cultural nation. The Frashëri brothers, the main leaders of the league opposed both Pan-Slavism of southern Slavic peoples and the Greek Megali Idea. The league opposed territory containing Albanian speakers being awarded to Greece, Serbia and Montenegro. The Ottoman state briefly supported the league's claims viewing Albanian nationalism as possibly preventing further territorial losses to newly independent Balkan states.

The geopolitical crisis generated the beginnings of the Rilindja (Albanian National Awakening) period. From 1878 onward Albanian nationalists and intellectuals, some who emerged as the first modern Albanian scholars, were preoccupied with overcoming linguistic and cultural differences between Albanian subgroups (Gegs and Tosks) and religious divisions (Muslim and Christians). At that time, these scholars lacked access to many primary sources to construct the idea that Albanians were descendants of Illyrians, while Greater Albania was not considered a priority. Compared with their Balkan counterparts, these Albanian politicians and historians were very moderate and mainly had the goal to attain socio-political recognition and autonomy for Albanians under Ottoman rule. Albanians involved in these activities were preoccupied with gathering and identifying evidence, at times inventing facts to justify claims to "prove" the cultural distinctiveness and historical legitimacy of the Albanians in being considered as a nation.

Taking their lead from the Italian national movement, the Arbëresh, (an Albanian diaspora community settled throughout southern Italy from the medieval period) began to promote and spread national ideas by introducing them to Balkan Albanians. Prominent among them were Girolamo de Rada, Giuseppe Schirò and Demetrio Camarda of whom were influenced through literature on Albania by Western scholars and referred within their literary works to a pre-Ottoman past, Skanderbeg, Pyrrhus of Epirus and Alexander the Great. While Muslim (especially Bektashi) Albanians were heavily involved with the Albanian National Awakening producing many figures like Faik Konitza, Ismail Kemal, Midhat Frashëri, Shahin Kolonja and others advocating for Albanian interests and self-determination. The Bektashi Sufi order of the late Ottoman period in Southern Albania also played a role during the Albanian National Awakening by cultivating and stimulating Albanian language and culture and was important in the construction of national Albanian ideology. Among Catholic Albanian figures involved were Prenk Doçi, Gjergj Fishta and Pashko Vasa who penned the famous poem Oh Albania which called for Albanians overcoming religious divisions through a united Albanianism. The last stanza of Vasa's poem Feja e shqyptarit asht shqyptarija (The faith of the Albanian is Albanianism) became during the national awakening period and thereafter a catchword for Albanian nationalists.

=== Myth of Skanderbeg ===
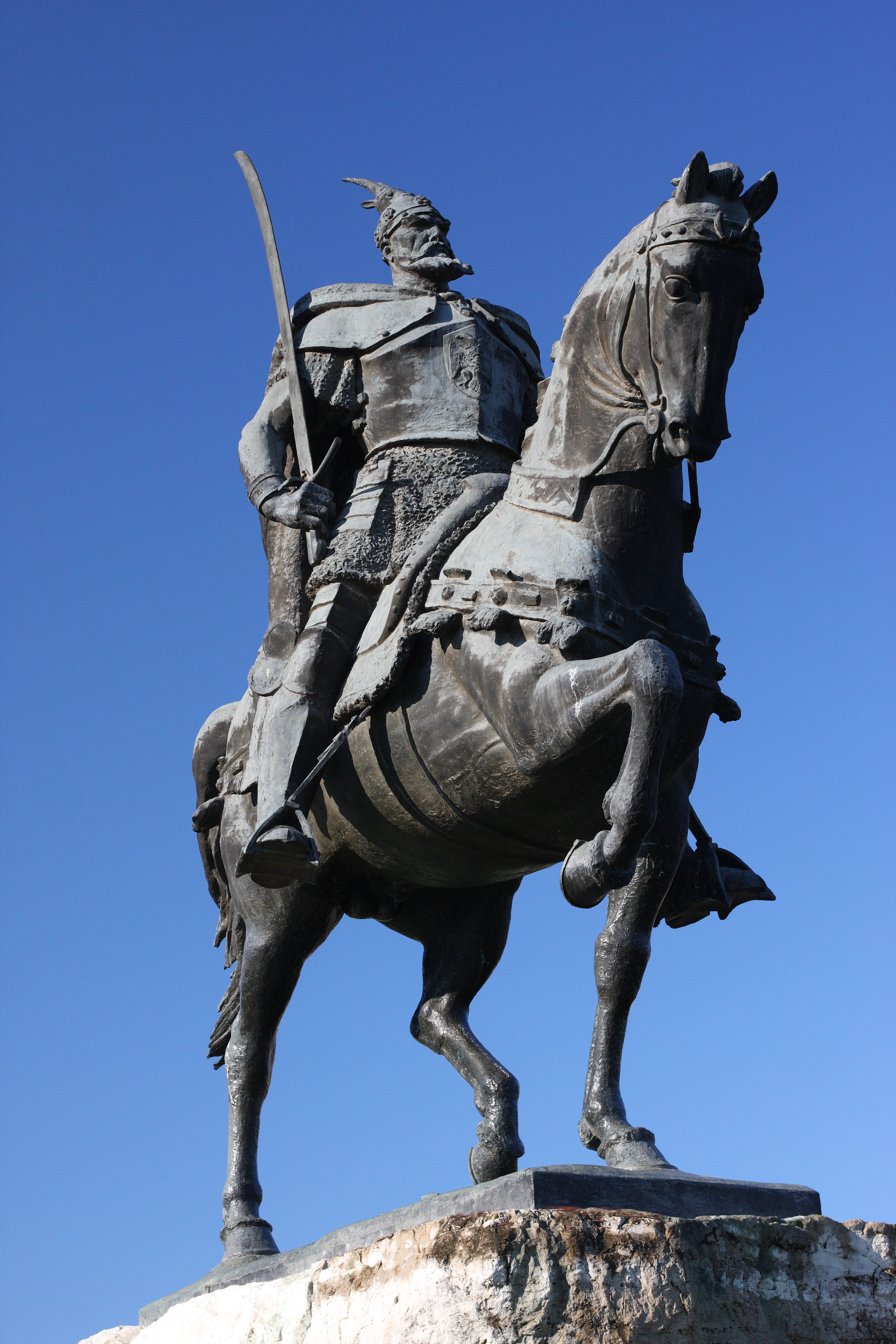
Skanderbeg Monument in Tirana.

Another factor overlaying geopolitical concerns during the National Awakening period were thoughts that Western powers would only favour Christian Balkan states and peoples in the anti Ottoman struggle. During this time Albanian nationalists attempting to gain Great Power sympathies and support conceived of Albanians as a European people who under Skanderbeg resisted Ottoman Turks that later subjugated and cut the Albanians off from Western European civilisation. As such, the Skanderbeg myth presented Albanians as defending Europe from the "Asian hordes" and allowed Albanians to develop the myth of Albanian resistance to foreign enemies that threatened the "fatherland" and the unity of the Albanian nation. Albanian nationalists needed an episode from medieval history to centre Albanian nationalist mythology upon and chose Skanderbeg in the absence of a medieval kingdom or empire. From the 15th to the 19th century Skanderbeg's fame survived mainly in Christian Europe and was based on a perception of Skanderbeg's Albania serving as Antemurale Christianitatis (a barrier state) against "invading Turks". In Albania, largely Islamicized during this period, Skanderbeg's fame faded and was rediscovered at the end of the 19th century when that figure was brought to the level of national myth. Another measure for nationalists promoting the Skanderbeg myth among Albanians was for them to turn their backs on their Ottoman heritage which was viewed as being the source of the Albanians' predicament. Skanderbeg's Christian identity was avoided and he was presented mainly as a defender of the nation. Albanian nationalist writers transformed Skanderbeg's figure and deeds into a mixture of historical facts, truths, half-truths, inventions, and folklore.

=== Hellenism, Orthodoxy and Albanian nationalism ===
For Orthodox Albanians, Albanianism was closely associated with Hellenism, linked through the faith of Orthodoxy and only during the Eastern crisis and thereafter was that premise rejected by a few Orthodox Albanianists. In southern Albania during the late Ottoman period being Albanian was increasingly associated with Islam, while from the 1880s the emerging Albanian National Movement was viewed as an obstacle to Hellenism within the region. Some Orthodox Albanians mainly from Korçë and its regions began to affiliate with the Albanian National movement by working together with Muslim Albanians regarding shared social, geopolitical Albanian interests and aims causing concerns for Greece. Contribution to the national movement by Orthodox Albanian nationalists was mainly undertaken outside the Ottoman state in the Albanian diaspora with activities focusing on educational issues and propaganda. As Orthodoxy was associated with Greek identity, the rise of the Albanian national movement caused confusion for Orthodox Albanians as it interrupted the formation of a Greek national consciousness.

In some areas, bitter schisms emerged among the Orthodox population as local pro-Greek and pro-Albanian factions confronted each other. This was especially the case in Lunxhëri, an Albanophone Orthodox region near the Greek border in Gjirokaster County. In the early 1800s, Western European travelers remarked that, going north from ethnically Greek Delvinaki, it "felt like a different country" whose people had different customs, and that the locals themselves believed that "Albania... the native country of the Albanians, begins from the town of Delvinaki." In that century, the region produced many prominent Albanian patriots and nationalist activists such as Koto Hoxhi, Vangjel and Kristo Meksi, Petro Poga, Pandeli Sotiri and Kosta Boshnjaku, but also powerful Grecophiles such as Zografos, the leader of the North Epirote insurgency (there were also those who were simultaneously Albanists and Hellenists, such as Anastas Byku). In the late Ottoman period, powerful Grecophile families forced the departure of many pro-Albanian Christians from the region, with some fleeing to America. Many local Orthodox Albanian nationalists died for their beliefs: Pandeli Sotiri was murdered by Grecophiles, while Koto Hoxhi was excommunicated and died in jail. After the failure of the North Epirote insurgency, a number of powerful pro-Greek families fled to Greece while some pro-Albanian families returned, and until modern migration to Greece, the remaining population came to mostly identify strongly as Albanian, including families which know they had originally been Grecophones from much further south.

At the onset of the twentieth century the idea to create an Albanian Orthodoxy or an Albanian expression of Orthodoxy emerged in the diaspora at a time when the Orthodox were increasingly being assimilated by the Patriarchate and Greece through the sphere of politics. The Orthodox Albanian community had individuals such as Jani Vreto, Spiro Dine and Fan Noli involved in the national movement and some of them advocated for an Albanian Orthodoxy in order to curtail the Hellenisation process occurring amongst Orthodox Albanians. In 1905, priest Kristo Negovani who had attained Albanian national sentiments abroad returned to his native village of Negovan and introduced the Albanian language for the first time in Orthodox liturgy. For his efforts Negovani was murdered by a Greek guerilla band on orders from Bishop Karavangelis of Kastoria that aroused a nationalist response with the Albanian guerilla band of Bajo Topulli killing the Metropolitan of Korçë, Photios. In 1907, an Orthodox Albanian immigrant Kristaq Dishnica was refused funeral services in the United States by a local Orthodox Greek priest for being an Albanian nationalist. Known as the Hudson incident, it galvanised the emigre Orthodox Albanian community to form the Albanian Orthodox Church under Fan Noli who hoped to diminish Greek influence in the church and counter Greek irredentism. For Albanian nationalists, Greek nationalism was a concern toward the end of the 19th century due to overlapping territorial claims toward the ethnically mixed vilayet of Yannina. Those issues also generated a reaction against Greek nationalists that drove the Albanian desire to stress a separate cultural identity.

=== Western influences and origin theories ===
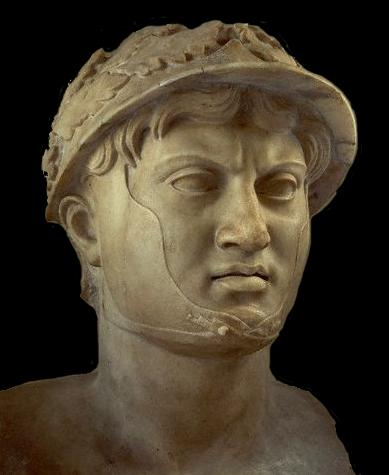
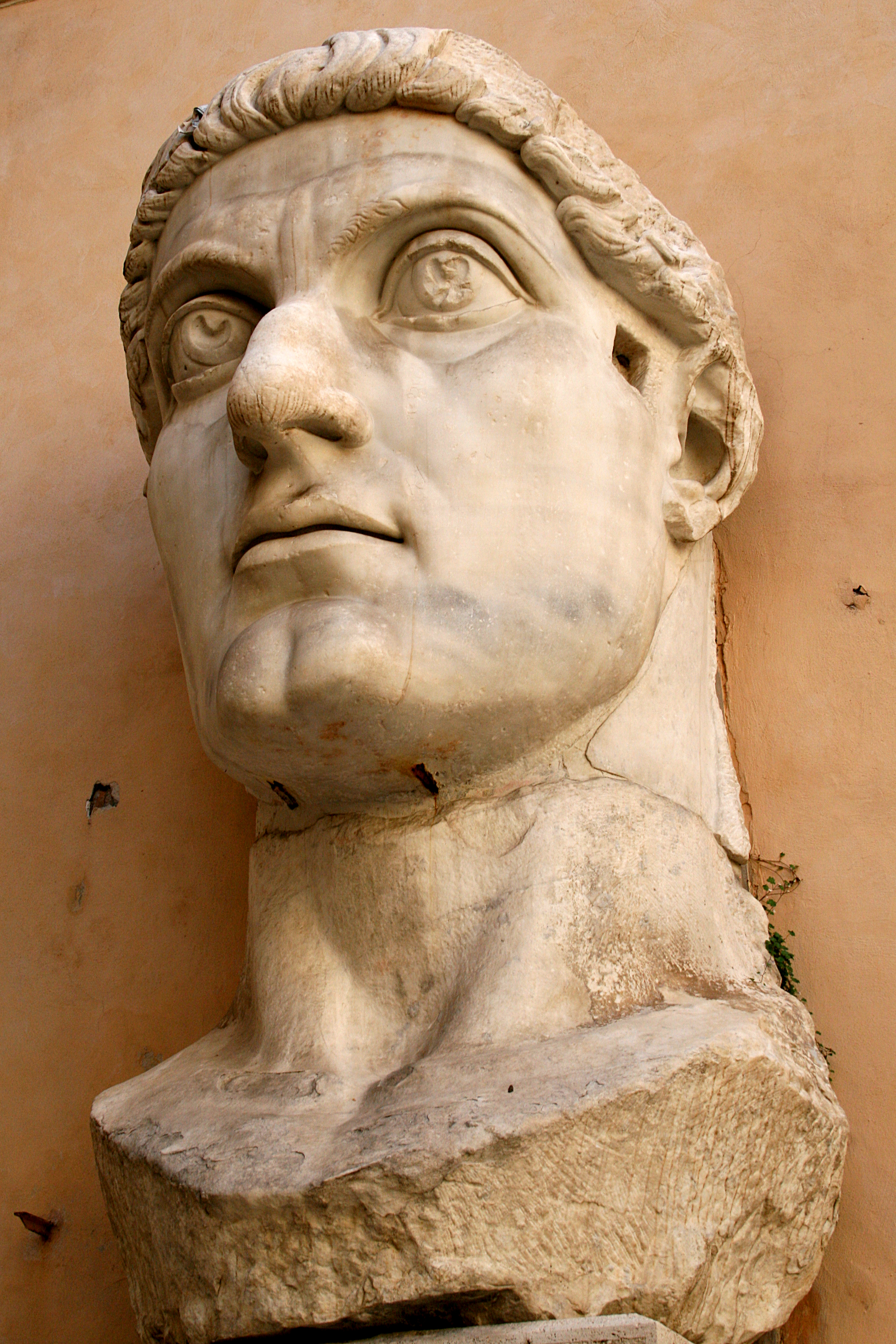
Albanian nationalism claims ancient Greek and Roman figures such as Pyrrhus of Epirus and Constantine the Great as Illyrian/Albanian.

In the 19th century Western academia imparted its influence on the emerging Albanian identity construction process by providing tools that were utilised and transformed in certain contexts and toward goals within a changing environment. This differed from the context from which Western authors had originally generated their theories. Albanian nationalists of the period were educated in foreign schools abroad. Some 19th century Western academics examining the issue of Albanian origins promoted the now-discredited theory of Albanian descent from ancient Pelasgians. Developed by the Austrian linguist Johann Georg von Hahn in his work Albanesiche Studien (1854) the theory claimed the Pelasgians as the original proto-Albanians and the language spoken by the Pelasgians, Illyrians, Epirotes and ancient Macedonians being closely related. This theory quickly attracted support in Albanian circles, as it established a claim of precedence over other Balkan nations, the Slavs and particularly the Greeks. In addition to generating a "historic right" to territory, this theory also established that ancient Greek civilization and its achievements had an "Albanian" origin.

The Pelasgian theory was adopted among early Albanian publicists and used by Italo-Albanians, Orthodox and Muslim Albanians. Italo-Albanians being of the Greek rite and their culture having strong ecclesiastical Byzantine influence were not in favour of the Illyrian-Albanian continuity hypothesis as it had overtones of being Catholic and hence Italianate. For Italo-Albanians, the origins of the Albanians lay with the Pelasgians, an obscure ancient people that lived during antiquity in parts of Greece and Albania. To validate Albanian claims for cultural and political emancipation, Italo-Albanians maintained that the Albanian language was the oldest in the region than even Greek. The theory of Pelasgian origins was used by the Greeks to attract and incorporate Albanians into the Greek national project through references to common Pelasgian descent. The Pelasgian theory was welcomed by some Albanian intellectuals who had received Greek schooling. For Orthodox Albanians such as Anastas Byku a common ancestry of both Albanians and Greeks through Pelasgian ancestors made both peoples the same and viewed the Albanian language as a conduit for Hellenisation. For Muslim Albanians like Sami Frashëri Albanians stemmed from the Pelasgians, an older population than Illyrians thereby predating the Greeks making for him the Albanians descendants of Illyrians who themselves originated from Pelasgians. Figures originating from the ancient period such as Alexander the Great and Pyrrhus of Epirus were enveloped in myth and claimed as Albanian men of antiquity while Philip II of Macedon, the ancient Macedonians were Pelasgian or Illyrian-Albanian.

Albanian writers of the period felt that they had counter arguments that came from the Greek side and from Slavic circles. The Greeks claimed that Albanians did not constitute a people, their language was a mixture of different languages and that an Albanian member of the Orthodox church was "really a Greek", while Slav publicists claimed that Kosovan Albanians were "really" Slavs or they were "Turks" who could be "sent back" to Anatolia. Apart from Greek nationalism being viewed as a threat to Albanian nationalism, emphasizing an antiquity of the Albanian nation served new political contexts and functions during the 1880s. It also arose from the Albanian need to counter Slavic national movements seeking independence from the Ottomans through a Balkan federation. In time the Pelasgian theory was replaced with the Illyrian theory regarding Albanian origins and descent due it being more convincing and supported by some scholars. The Illyrian theory became an important pillar of Albanian nationalism due to its consideration as evidence of Albanian continuity in territories such as Kosovo and the south of Albania contested with the Serbs and Greeks.

=== Geopolitical consequences and legacy ===
Unlike their Greek, Serbian and Bulgarian neighbours who had territorial ambitions, Albanians due to being mainly Muslim lacked a powerful European patron. This made many of them want to preserve the status quo and back Ottomanism. By the early 20th century, Albanian nationalism was advanced by a wide-ranging group of Albanian politicians, intellectuals and exiles. An Albanian emigrant community was present in the United States during the late 19th and early 20th centuries with the majority being illiterate and individuals like Sotir Peci worked to impart a sense of Albanian nationhood among them encouraging the spread of literacy in Albanian. In 1908, an alphabet congress with Muslim, Catholic and Orthodox delegates in attendance agreed to adopt a Latin character-based Albanian alphabet and the move was considered an important step for Albanian unification. Opposition toward the Latin alphabet came from some Albanian Muslims and clerics who with the Ottoman government preferred an Arabic-based Albanian alphabet, due to concerns that a Latin alphabet undermined ties with the Muslim world. Due to the alphabet matter and other Young Turk policies, relations between Albanian elites and nationalists, many Muslim and Ottoman authorities broke down. The Ottoman Young Turk government was concerned that Albanian nationalism might inspire other Muslim nationalities toward such initiatives and threaten the Muslim-based unity of the empire. Though at first Albanian nationalist clubs were not curtailed, the demands for political, cultural and linguistic rights eventually made the Ottomans adopt measures to repress Albanian nationalism which resulted in two Albanian revolts toward the end of Ottoman rule. The first revolt was during 1910 in northern Albania and Kosovo reacting toward the new Ottoman government policy of centralization. The other revolt in the same areas was in 1912 that sought Albanian political and linguistic self-determination under the bounds of the Ottoman Empire and with both revolts many of the leaders and fighters were Muslim and Catholic Albanians. These Albanian revolts were also a turning point that impacted the Young Turk government which increasingly moved from a policy direction of pan-Ottomanism and Islam toward a singular national Turkish outlook.

Albanian nationalism during the late Ottoman era was not imbued with separatism that aimed to create an Albanian nation-state, though Albanian nationalists did envisage an independent Greater Albania. Albanian nationalists of the late Ottoman period were divided into three groups. Pan-Albanian nationalists, those who wanted to safeguard Albanian autonomy under an Ottoman state and an Albania divided along sectarian lines with an independent Catholic Albania envisaged mainly by Catholics. In the late Ottoman period Bektashi Muslims in Albania distanced themselves from Albanian Sunnis who opposed Albanian independence. Though neglected in Albanian historiography, there were people who came from a Balkan Albanian speaking or cultural space, mainly from urban centres and stemming from the elite who often though not always when migrating to Anatolia did not identify with a concept of Albanianess. Instead they adopted an Ottoman Turkish outlook and came to refer to themselves as Turks or Ottoman Turkish speaking citizens. Due to the effects of socio-linguistic assimilation, promoters of Albanian nationalism became concerned about migration to Anatolia and degraded Albanians from the lower classes who undertook the journey. The emerging Albanian nationalist elite promoted the use of the Albanian language as a medium of political and intellectual expression. Policies of national exclusivity by Serbs and Greeks like an abandonment of the common Pelasgian descent theory and stressing the importance of Greek language as a component of Greek nationalism left little room for alternative national affiliations among Albanian Catholics and to an extent Orthodox Albanians. Non-Muslim Albanians accepted the idea of a multi-faith Albanian nation due to a number of other factors such as a distinct language differing from other Balkan peoples and imagined common Illyrian descent. Albanian nationalism overall was a reaction to the gradual breakup of the Ottoman Empire and a response to Balkan and Christian national movements that posed a threat to an Albanian population that was mainly Muslim. Efforts were devoted to including vilayets with an Albanian population into a larger unitary Albanian autonomous province within the Ottoman state.

Albanian nationalists were mainly focused on defending rights that were sociocultural, historic and linguistic within existing countries without being connected to a particular polity. Unlike other Balkan nationalisms religion was seen as an obstacle and Albanian nationalism competed with it and developed an anti clerical outlook. As Albanians lived in an Ottoman millet system that stressed religious identities over other forms of identification, the myth of religious indifference was formed during the National Awakening as a means to overcome internal religious divisions among Albanians. Promoted as civil religion of sorts, Albanianism as an idea was developed by Albanian nationalists to downplay established religions such as Christianity and Islam among Albanians while a non-religious Albanian identity was stressed. Within the Albanian movement a few members of the elite promoted other religions as the basis for unity, such as syncretic Bektashi beliefs or the call to adhere to the original faith of the Albanians purported to be based on ancient Pelasgian-Illyrian roots or Christianity. Overall Albanian nationalists of the period viewed religion as a private matter and stressed the need that Albanians ought to tolerate the differences of other faiths existing among them. Religion did not play a significant role as in other Balkan nationalisms or to mainly become a divisive factor in the formation of Albanian nationalism which resembled Western European nationalisms. The Albanian language instead of religion became the primary focus of promoting national unity. Albanian National Awakening figures during the late Ottoman period generated vernacular literature in Albanian. Often those works were poems which contained nationalist aspirations and political themes which in part secured support for the Albanian nationalist cause when transformed into narrative songs that spread among the male population of Albanian speaking villagers in the Balkans. Nation building efforts gained momentum after 1900 among the Catholic population by the clergy and members such as craftsmen and traders of the Bektashi and Orthodox community in the south. With a de-emphasis of Islam, the Albanian nationalist movement gained the strong support of two Adriatic sea powers Austria-Hungary and Italy who were concerned about pan-Slavism in the wider Balkans and Anglo-French hegemony purportedly represented through Greece in the area. The Austro-Hungarians and Italians supported the development of an Albanian national consciousnesses as a precursor for the creation of an Albanian state and devoted assistance toward that aim mainly among Albanian Catholics.

== Independence, Interwar period and World War Two (1912-1944) ==
=== Independence ===
The imminence of collapsing Ottoman rule through military defeat during the Balkan wars pushed Albanians represented by Ismail Kemal to declare independence (28 November 1912) in Vlorë from the Ottoman Empire. The main motivation for independence was to prevent Balkan Albanian inhabited lands from being annexed by Greece and Serbia. Italy and Austria-Hungary supported Albanian independence due to their concerns that Serbia with an Albanian coast would be a rival power in the Adriatic Sea and open to influence from its ally Russia. Apart from geopolitical interests, some Great powers were reluctant to include more Ottoman Balkan Albanian inhabited lands into Albania due to concerns that it would be the only Muslim dominated state in Europe. Russo-French proposals were for a truncated Albania based on central Albania with a mainly Muslim population, which was also supported by Serbia and Greece who considered that only Muslims could be Albanians (and not even all Albanophone Muslims necessarily). As more Albanians became part of the Serbian and Greek states, Albanian scholars with nationalistic perspectives interpret the declaration of independence as a partial victory for the Albanian nationalist movement. After recognising Albanian independence and its provisional borders in 1913, the Great powers imposed on Albania a Christian German prince Wilhelm of Wied to be its ruler in 1914. In the ensuring power struggles and disquiet over having a Christian monarch, a failed Muslim uprising (1914) broke out in central Albania that sought to restore Ottoman rule while northern and southern Albania distanced themselves from those events. During this period and that of the early 20th century most Orthodox Albanians in southern Albania supported the unification of the area with Greece and were opposed to living in an Albania under leaders composed of Muslim Albanians.

On the eve of independence the bulk of Albanians still adhered to pre-nationalist categories like religious affiliation, family or region. Both highlanders and peasants were unprepared for a modern nation state and it was used as an argument against Albanian statehood. With the alternative being partition of Balkan Albanian inhabited lands by neighbouring countries, overcoming a fragile national consciousness and multiple internal divisions was paramount for nationalists like state leader Ismail Kemal. Developing a strong Albanian national consciousness and sentiment overrode other concerns such as annexing areas with an Albanian population like Kosovo. Albania during World War One was occupied by foreign powers and they pursued policies which strengthened expressions of Albanian nationalism especially in Southern Albania. Italian and French authorities closed down Greek schools, expelled Greek clergy and pro-Greek notables while allowing Albanian education with the French sector promoting Albanian self-government through the Korçë republic. Another factor that reinforced nationalistic sentiments among the population was the return of 20–30,000 Orthodox Albanian emigrants mainly to the Korçë region who had attained Albanian nationalist sentiments abroad. The experience of World War One, concerns over being partitioned and loss of power made the Muslim Albanian population support Albanian nationalism and the territorial integrity of Albania. An understanding also emerged between most Sunni and Bektashi Albanians that religious differences needed to be sidelined for national cohesiveness. Abandonment of pan-Muslim links abroad was viewed within the context of securing international support for and maintaining independence with some Muslim Albanian clergy being against disavowing ties with the wider Muslim world.

=== Interwar period (1919-1938) ===
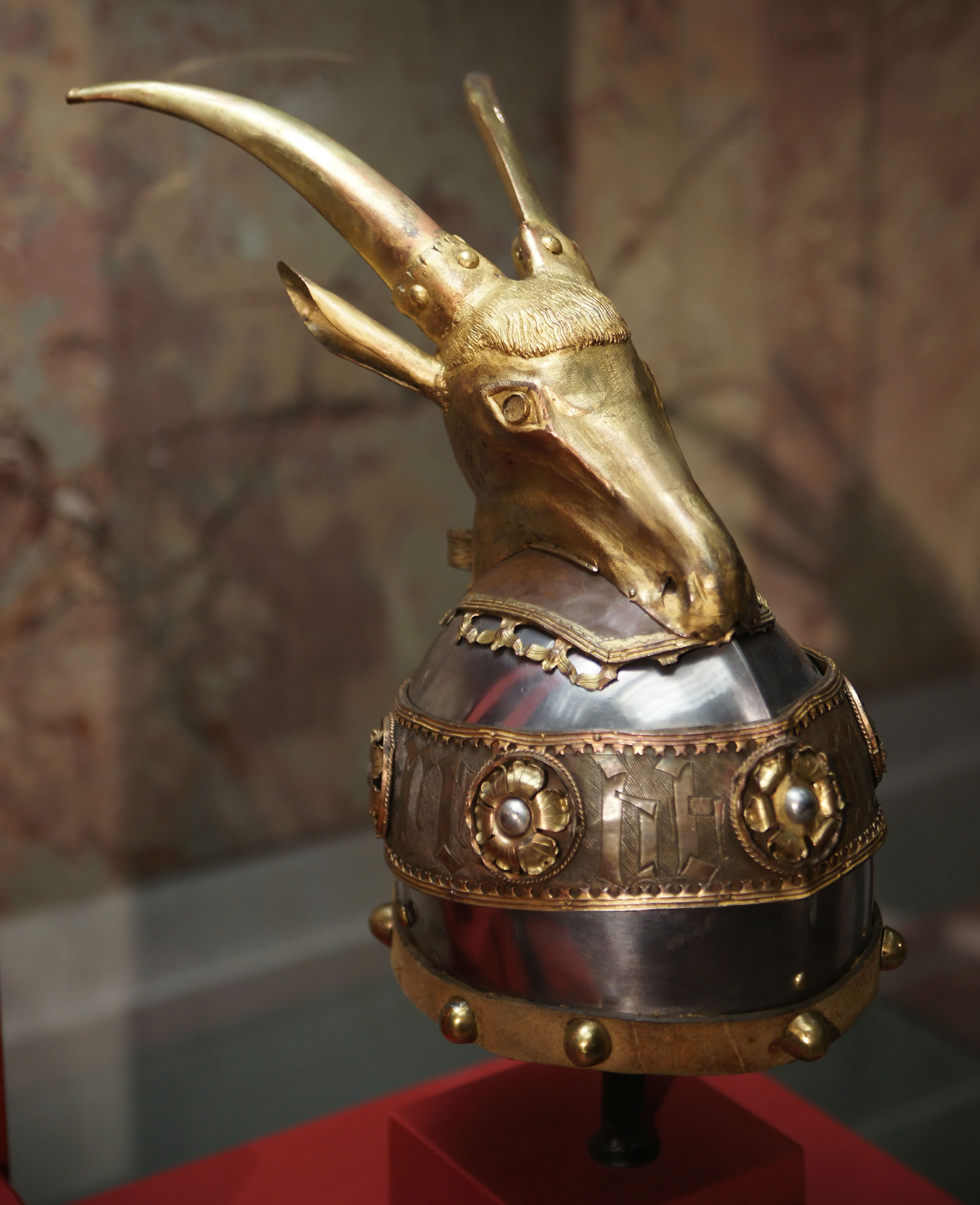
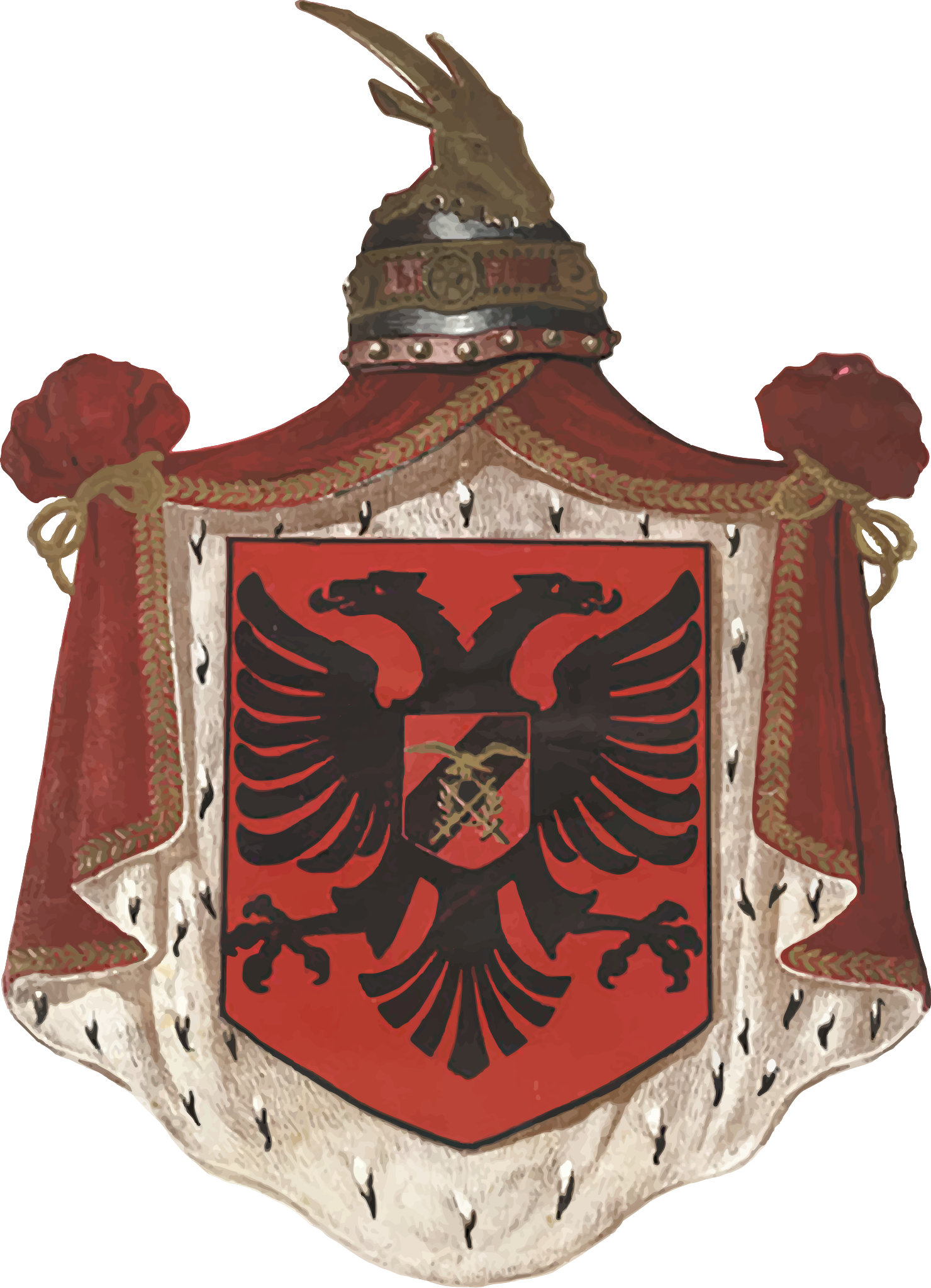
The helmet of Skanderbeg, left; Coat of arms of the Albanian Kingdom (1928–1939), right

During the 1920s the role of religion was downplayed by the Albanian state who instead promoted Albanianism, a broad civic form of nationalism that looked to highlight ethnonational identity over religious identities. Orthodox Albanians undertook to implement many reforms due to their previous Ottoman status of being an underclass by desiring to move Albania away from its Muslim Ottoman heritage. In Southern Albania, Albanian nationalists (many Orthodox) were the majority in the Korçë region, while west of the Vjosa river and in the Gjirokastër region the Orthodox Albanian population retained Greek sentiments. A generational divide emerged among the Orthodox with youth supporting nationalist ideas due to their perceived modern character, while support for Greece remained with older generations. Among the Orthodox a new group the moderates emerged which supported the state and nationalism while holding reservations about being included in Albania and viewed Greece as an alternative option. In areas such as the Korçë region where Orthodox Albanians became affected by Albanian nationalism they moved away from Orthodox church influence and tended to lose their religious identity, while in areas were the Orthodox population was the majority they often retained their religious identity. A congress of Berat in 1922 was convened to formally lay the foundations of an Albanian Orthodox Church which consecrated Fan Noli as Bishop of Korçë and primate of all Albania while the establishment of the church was seen as important for maintaining Albanian national unity. The Patriarchate in Istanbul recognised the independence or autocephaly of the Orthodox Albanian Church in 1937. In northern-central Albania an attempt was made by Albanian Catholics to secede and create the Republic of Mirdita (1921) with Yugoslav support and assistance due to Catholic claims that the Albanian government was going to ban Catholicism and the secessionist move was put down by Albanian troops. In 1923, an Islamic congress supervised by the Albanian government was convened by Sunni Muslim representatives to consider reforms and among those adopted was a break in ties with the caliphate in Istanbul and to establish local Muslim structures loyal to Albania. Sharia law became subordinated to a new civil law code and Muslims in Albania came under government control. The Bektashi order in 1922 at an assembly of 500 delegates renounced ties with Turkey and by 1925 moved their headquarters to Albania.

The ascension of Ahmet Zog as prime minister (1925) and later king (1929) during the interwar period was marked by limited though necessary political stability. Along with resistance by Zog to interwar Italian political and economic influence in Albania those factors contributed to an environment were an Albanian national consciousness could grow. Under Zog regional affiliations and tribal loyalties were gradually replaced with a developing form of modern nationalism. During that time Zog attempted to instill a national consciousness through the scope of a teleological past based upon Illyrian descent, Skanderbeg's resistance to the Ottomans and the nationalist reawakening (Rilindja) of the 19th and early 20th centuries. The myth of Skanderbeg under Zog was used for nation building purposes and his helmet was adopted in national symbols. Zog's concerns during the interwar period about suspected propaganda within foreign run schools, Greek in the south and especially Italian run Catholic ones in the north prompted a complete shutdown which overall was a major set back for nationalism. Generating mass nationalism was difficult during the interwar period as even in 1939, 80% of Albanians were still illiterate. Apart from using the title King of the Albanians Zog did not pursue irredentist policies such as toward Kosovo due to rivalries with Kosovan Albanian elites and an agreement recognizing Yugoslav sovereignty over Kosovo in return for support. Zog's efforts toward the development of Albanian nationalism made the task simpler for leaders that came after him regarding the process of Albanian state and nation building. By the 1930s Muslim Albanians were divided into three groups. The Elders (Të vjetër) who were Muslim conservatives, the Young (Të rinjtë) who rejected religion and the Neo-Albanians (Neoshqiptarët) who opposed religious sectarianism stressing Albanian identity and culture with some preferring Bektashism due to its links with Albanian nationalism. During the interwar period Catholics viewed the Albanian central government as a Muslim one, while the Orthodox felt that in a political context they were dominated by Muslims.

=== World War Two (1939-1944) ===
On 7 April 1939, Italy headed by Benito Mussolini after prolonged interest and overarching sphere of influence during the interwar period invaded Albania. Italian fascist regime members such as Count Galeazzo Ciano pursued Albanian irredentism with the view that it would earn Italians support among Albanians while also coinciding with Italian war aims of Balkan conquest. The Italian occupying force in 1939 was welcomed by most Catholic Albanians who viewed them as their co-religionists. Italian authorities deemed northern tribal chieftains as being overall politically insignificant and allowed them freedom to run their affairs which damaged emerging Albanian nationalism by undoing Zog's attempts at supplanting local loyalties with state loyalties. The Italian annexation of Kosovo to Albania was considered a popular action by Albanians of both areas. In newly acquired territories, non-Albanians had to attend Albanian schools that taught a curricula containing nationalism alongside fascism and were made to adopt Albanian forms for their names and surnames. Members from the landowning elite, liberal nationalists opposed to communism with other sectors of society came to form the Balli Kombëtar organisation and the collaborationist government under the Italians which all as nationalists sought to preserve Greater Albania. While Italians expressed increased concerns about conceding authority to them. In time the Italian occupation became disliked by sections of the Albanian population such as the intelligentsia, students, other professional classes and town dwellers that generated further an emerging Albanian nationalism fostered during the Zog years.

The same nationalist sentiments among Albanians which welcomed the addition of Kosovo and its Albanians within an enlarged state also worked against the Italians as foreign occupation became increasingly rejected. Apart from verbal opposition, other responses to the Italian presence eventually emerged as armed insurrection through the Albanian communist party. Italian authorities had misjudged the growth of an Albanian national consciousness during the Zog years with the assumption that Albanian nationalism was weak or could be directed by the Italians. Regional divisions became heightened when resistance groups with differing agendas emerged in the north and south of Albania which slowed the growth of nationalism. With Italy's surrender in 1943 they became replaced outright in Albania with German forces. German occupational authorities instigated a policy of threatening the collaborationist government with military action, communist ascendancy or loss of autonomy and Kosovo to keep them in line. The Germans like the Italians misunderstood Albanian nationalism with; as a result, Albanian noncommunists lost credibility while the communist partisans appealed to growing Albanian nationalism. In a post-war setting this meant that groups such as Balli Kombëtar who had aligned with the Axis powers were unable to take power, while emerging leaders such as communist Enver Hoxha solidified his claim to that role by being a nationalist.

== Albanian Nationalism during the People's Republic of Albania (1945–1991) ==
Neither Moslem nor Christian, but Albanian.
Neither Gheg nor Tosk, but Albanian.

— Communist era slogans during the Albanian cultural revolution (1960s),

.

Albania in the immediate aftermath of the Second World War entered into a dependent economic and political relationship with Yugoslavia that sought to bring together and eventually unite the two countries. Within the Albanian communist leadership Koçi Xoxe supported Tito and the Yugoslavs and both disliked Hoxha for being nationalistic. Hoxha later took advantage of the Tito-Stalin split by siding with the Soviets and preserved Albanian independence. Hoxha emerged as leader of Albania at the end of the war and was left with the task of reconstructing Albania from what foundations remained from the Zog years. Hoxha viewed as his goal the construction of a viable independent Albanian nation state based around a "monolithic unity" of the Albanian people. Albanian society was still traditionally divided between four religious communities. In the Albanian census of 1945, Muslims (Sunni and Bektashi) were 72% of the population, 17.2% were Orthodox and 10% Catholic. The support base of the communist party was small and the need to sideline the Kosovo issue resulted in Hoxha resorting to extreme nationalism to remain in power and to turn Albania into a Stalinist state. Hoxha implemented widespread education reform aimed at eradicating illiteracy and education which became used to impart the regime's communist ideology and nationalism. In Albania nationalism during communism had as its basis the ideology of Marxism–Leninism.

=== Nationalist ideology during communism ===
Nationalism became the basis for all of Hoxha's policies as the war created a "state of siege nationalism" imbued with the myth that Albanian military prowess defeated Axis forces which became a centrepiece of the regime within the context of education and culture. Other themes of Hoxha's nationalism included revering Skanderbeg, the League of Prizren meeting (1878), the Alphabet Congress (1908), Albanian independence (1912) and founding father Ismail Kemal, the Italian defeat during the Vlora War (1920) and Hoxha as creator of a new Albania. During communism numerous historians from Albania with nationalist perspectives (Ramadan Marmallaku, Kristo Frasheri, Skender Anamali, Stefanaq Pollo, Skender Rizaj and Arben Puto) intentionally emphasized "the Turkish savagery" and "heroic Christian resistance against" the Ottoman state in Albania. Some scholars that resisted those anti-Islamic and anti-Turkish propaganda trends were persecuted while the communist regime highlighted myths related to medieval Albanians by interpreting them as the "heroic Illyrian proletariat". Within that context Hoxha preserved national monuments in urban areas with some settlements being designated as museum cities and he also stressed the need to preserve cultural heritage, folk songs, dances and costumes. Hoxha created and generated a cultural environment that was dominated by doctrinal propaganda stressing nationalism in the areas of literature, geography, history, linguistics, ethnology and folklore so people in Albania would have a sense of their past. The effects among people were that it instilled isolationism, xenophobia, slavophobia, linguistic uniformity and ethnic compactness.

=== Origin theories during communism ===
Imitating Stalinist trends in the Communist Bloc, Albania developed its own version of protochronist ideology, which stressed the national superiority and continuity of Albanians from ancient peoples such as the Illyrians. At first the issue of Albanian ethnogenesis was an open question for Albanian scholarship in the 1950s. Hoxha personally supported the Pelasgian theory though officially intervened on the matter by declaring Albanian origins to be Illyrian (without excluding Pelasgian roots) and ended further discussion on the subject. Albanian archaeologists were directed by Hoxha (1960s onward) to follow a nationalist agenda that focused on Illyrians and Illyrian-Albanian continuity with studies published on those topics used as communist political propaganda that omitted mention of Pelasgians. Emphasizing an autochthonous ethnogenesis for Albanians, Hoxha insisted on Albanian linguists and archeologists to connect the Albanian language with the extinct Illyrian language. The emerging archeological scene funded and enforced by the communist government stressed that the ancestors of the Albanians ruled over a unified and large territory possessing a unique culture. Toward that endeavour Albanian archaeologists also claimed that ancient Greek poleis, ideas, culture were wholly Illyrian and that a majority of names belonging to the Greek deities stemmed from Illyrian words. Albanian publications and television programs (1960s onward) have taught Albanians to understand themselves as descendants of "Indo-European" Illyrian tribes inhabiting the western Balkans from the second to third millennium while claiming them as the oldest indigenous people in that area and on par with the Greeks. Physical anthropologists also tried to demonstrate that Albanians were biologically different from other Indo-European populations, a hypothesis now refuted through genetic analysis.

=== Nationalism and religion ===
The communist regime through Albanian nationalism attempted to forge a national identity that transcended and eroded religious and other differences with the aim of forming a unitary Albanian identity. The communists promoted the idea that religious feeling, even in a historic context among Albanians was minimal and that instead national sentiment was always important. Albanian communists viewed religion as a societal threat that undermined the cohesiveness of the nation. Within this context religions like Islam and Christianity were denounced as foreign with Muslim and Christian clergy criticised as being socially backward with the propensity to become agents of other states and undermine Albanian interests. Nationalism was also used as a tool by Hoxha during his struggle to break Albania out of the Soviet bloc. Inspired by Pashko Vasa's late 19th century poem for the need to overcome religious differences through Albanian unity, Hoxha took and exploited the stanza "the faith of the Albanians is Albanianism" and implemented it literally as state policy. The communist regime proclaimed that the only religion of the Albanians was Albanianism. In 1967 the communist regime declared Albania the only atheist and non-religious country in the world and banned all forms of religious practice in public. Within the space of several months the communist regime destroyed 2,169 religious buildings (mosques, churches and other monuments) while Muslim and Christian clergy were imprisoned, persecuted and in some cases killed. The Catholic Church of Albania in particular bore the brunt of the regime's violent anti-religious campaign as Hoxha viewed it as a tool of the Vatican and Albanian Catholics as less patriotic than the Orthodox and Muslims. The communist regime through policy destroyed the Muslim way of life and Islamic culture within Albania. Though Muslim Albanians were affected, the Orthodox community made up of Albanians, Macedonians, Aromanians and Greeks was affected more due to the Ottoman legacy of Orthodox identity being associated with religious practice and language.

=== Name changes ===
Within the context of anti religion policies the communist regime ordered in 1975 mandatory name changes, in particular surnames for citizens in Albania that were deemed "inappropriate" or "offensive from a political, ideological and moral standpoint". The regime insisted that parents and children attain non religious names that were derived from Albanian mythological figures, geographical features and newly coined names. These names were often ascribed a supposedly "Illyrian" and pagan origin while given names associated with the Muslim tradition or Christianity were strongly discouraged. This trend had originated with the 19th century Rilindja, but it became extreme after 1944, when it became the communist regime's declared doctrine to oust Muslim or Christian given names. Ideologically acceptable names were listed in the Fjalor me emra njerëzish (1982). These could be native Albanian words like Flutur "butterfly", ideologically communist ones like Proletare, or "Illyrian" ones compiled from epigraphy, e.g. from the necropolis at Dyrrhachion excavated in 1958–60. Non-Albanian names were replaced which went alongside the regime's brutal version of Albanian nationalism. These approaches resulted for example in the Albanianisation of toponyms in areas where some Slavic minorities resided through official decree (1966) and of Slavic youth though not outright of the Macedonian community as a whole. The communist regime also pursued a nationalistic anti-Greek policy. Greeks in Albania were forced to Albanianise their names and choose ones that did not have ethnic or religious connotations resulting in Greek families giving children different names so as to pass for Albanians in the wider population. Albanian nationalism in the 1980s became an important political factor within the scope of Hoxha's communist doctrines.

== Contemporary Albanian nationalism (1992-present) ==
=== Post-communist developments in society and politics ===
Due to the legacy of Hoxha's dictatorial and violent regime, Albanians in a post communist environment have rejected Hoxha's version of Albanian nationalism. Instead it has been replaced with a weak form of civic nationalism and regionalism alongside in some instances with a certain anti-nationalism that has inhibited the construction of an Albanian civil society. Within the context of nationalist discourses during the 1990s the governing Albanian Democratic Party regarding European aspirations stressed aspects of Catholicism and as some government members were Muslims made overtures about Islam to join international organisations like the Organisation of Islamic Cooperation (OIC). Post-communist Albanian governments view the tenets of the Albanian National Awakening as being a guiding influence for Albania by placing the nation above sociopolitical and religious differences and steering the country toward Euro-Atlantic integration. Themes and concepts of history from the Zog and later Hoxha era have still continued to be modified and adopted within a post communist environment to fit contemporary Albania's aspirations regarding Europe.

Trends from Albanian nationalist historiography composed by scholars during and of the communist era onward linger on that interpret Ottoman rule as being the "yoke" period, akin to other Balkan historiographies. The legacy of understanding history through such dichotomies has remained for a majority of Albanians which for example they view Skanderbeg and the anti-Ottoman forces as "good" while the Ottomans are "bad". The Albanian government depicts Skanderbeg as a leader of the Albanian resistance to the Ottomans and creator of an Albanian centralised state without emphasizing his Christian background. Christian communities in Albania highlight Skanderbeg's Christian heritage, while Muslim and non religious Albanians deemphasize his religious background and mainly view him as a defender of the nation. Skanderbeg is promoted as an Albanian symbol of Europe and the West. In a post communist environment among some circles myths based on religion with an anti-Western outlook have been generated that views Muslims as the only "true Albanians" by celebrating the conversion to Islam as saving Albanians from assimilating into Serbs and Greeks. Some also hold the view that Skanderbeg should not be the national hero as he served the Christians after he betrayed the Ottomans. The Albanian state emphasizes religious tolerance and coexistence without pressuring its citizens to follow a particular faith. The Albanian political establishment promotes Christian figures over Muslim ones in relation to nation building with the idea of deemphasizing Albania's Islamic heritage to curry favour with the West. Figures from the Muslim community such as state founder Ismail Kemal is revered by the government and viewed by Albanians as a defender of the nation though their religious background has been sidelined.

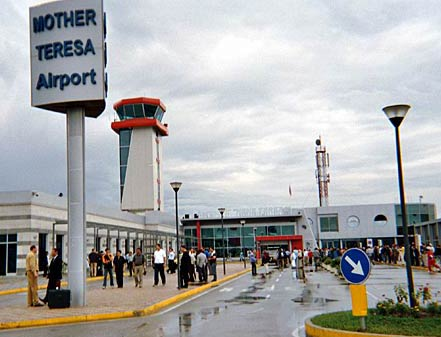
Tirana International Airport Mother Teresa named after Saint Mother Teresa

The figure of Saint Mother Teresa, an Albanian nun known for missionary activities in India has been used for nationalist purposes in Albania. Within Albania she is promoted inside and outside Albania by the political elite as an Albanian symbol of the West to enhance the country's international status regarding Euro-Atlantic aspirations and integration. Some Muslim Albanian circles have expressed that promotion by the Albanian political elite of Mother Teresa in Albanian society has been at the expense of Islam and its heritage while contravening the Albanian government's secularist principles. Mother Teresa is an important symbol of the Albanian Catholic community, while Muslim Albanians deemphasize her religious background and acknowledge her charitable works. Albanian nationalism overall is not attached to a particular denomination or religion. The ambiguity of Islam and its place and role among Balkan (Muslim) Albanians has limited the ability of it becoming a major component to advance the cause of Great Albania. During the Kosovo crisis (1999) Albania was divided between two positions. The first being an Albanian nationalism motivating Albania to aid and provide refuge for Kosovan Albanian refugees while being a conduit for arming Kosovan Albanians and the second that the country was unable to provide those resources, aid and asylum.

Within the sphere of politics anti-Greek sentiments exist and have for instance been expressed by the nationalist movement turned political party the Red and Black Alliance (AK). Anti-Greek sentiments expressed as conspiracy theories among Albanians are over perceived fears of hellenisation of Albanians through economic incentives creating a "time-bomb" by artificially raising Greek numbers alongside Greek irredentism toward Southern Albania. There are conspiracy theories in which the identification with Greek expansionist plans would classify them as potential enemies of the state. However, while within the context of migration to Greece in a post communist environment, many Orthodox Albanians have expressed that they have Greek origins and declared themselves as Northern-Epirots (Greek: Βορειοηπειρώτες Vorioipirotes, Albanian: Vorioepirot) which is synonymous with Greek identity, as Greeks are given pensions and preferential treatment in emigration; however, it has been noted that many of the same Orthodox Albanians who are claiming "North Epirote" identity or even forging documents to present themselves as Greek minority members also voice strong Albanian nationalist views, and furthermore that Muslim Albanians from regions such as Devoll have converted to Orthodoxy and changed their names to Greek as they emigrated, drawing the mockery of their Albanian Orthodox neighbors who did not emigrate and insist on a solely Albanian identity. Some Albanians are in favour of Albania being more self-assertive and having a more ethnonationalist strategy toward the "Greek issue". During the Euro 2016 tournament and the 2020 PDIU gathering, a banner was raised by Albanian fans claiming that "Greece has committed a genocide against 100.000 Cham Albanians", a claim which was rejected by Greece's Foreign Minister of that time, Nikos Kotzias, by stating that the Cham minority's total population was 18.000 at the time. Various organizations and parties concerned with the Cham issue organize annual events and gatherings, and in some cases protests against the government.

=== Greater Albania and Albanian politics ===
Official ensign of the Albanian National Army

Political parties advocating and willing to fight for a Greater Albania emerged in Albania during the 2000s. They were the National Liberation Front of Albanians (KKCMTSH) and Party of National Unity (PUK) that both merged in 2002 to form the United National Albanian Front (FBKSh) which acted as the political organisation for the Albanian National Army (AKSh) militant group. Regarded internationally as terrorist both have gone underground and its members have been involved in various violent incidents in Kosovo, Serbia and Macedonia during the 2000s. In the early 2000s, the Liberation Army of Chameria (UCC) was a reported paramilitary formation that intended to be active in northern Greek region of Epirus. Political parties active only in the political scene exist that have a nationalist outlook are the monarchist Legality Movement Party (PLL), the National Unity Party (PBKSh) alongside the Balli Kombëtar, a party to have passed the electoral threshold and enter parliament. These political parties, some of whom advocate for a Greater Albania, have been mainly insignificant and remained at the margins of the Albanian political scene.

Another nationalist party to have passed the electoral threshold is the Party for Justice, Integration and Unity (PDIU) which focuses on issues relevant to the Cham Albanian community regarding property and other issues related to their Second World War exile from northern Greece. The current socialist prime minister Edi Rama in coalition with the PDIU has raised the Cham issue, while at PDIU gatherings made comments about ancient Greek deities and references to surrounding territories as being Albanian earning stern rebukes from Greece. Some similar views have also been voiced by members from Albania's political elite from time to time.

The Kosovo question has limited appeal among Albanian voters and are not interested in electing parties advocating redrawn borders creating a Greater Albania. Centenary Albanian independence celebrations in 2012 generated nationalistic commentary among the political elite of whom prime-minister Sali Berisha referred to Albanian lands as extending from Preveza (in northern Greece) to Preševo (in southern Serbia), angering Albania's neighbors. Greater Albania remains mainly in the sphere of political rhetoric and overall Balkan Albanians view EU integration as the solution to combat crime, weak governance, civil society and bringing different Albanian populations together.

=== Influence of origin theories in contemporary society and politics ===
Within the sphere of Albanian politics, the Illyrians are officially regarded as the ancestors of the Albanians. Catholic Albanians are generally in favour of the Illyrian theory, while Orthodox Albanians do not support it due to associations with the Illyrian movement of Catholic Croats or Roman heritage, and they do not oppose it openly as power is held mainly by Muslim Albanians. The Illyrian theory continues to influence Albanian nationalism, scholarship and archeologists as it is seen as providing some evidence of continuity of an Albanian presence in Kosovo, western Macedonia and southern Albania, i.e., areas that were subject to ethnic conflicts between Albanians, Serbs, Macedonians and Greeks. For some Albanian nationalists claiming descent from Illyrians as the oldest inhabitants of the Western Balkans allows them to assert a "prior claim" to sizable lands in the Balkans. Greek and Roman figures from antiquity such as Aristotle, Pyrrhus of Epirus, Alexander the Great and Constantine the Great are also claimed.

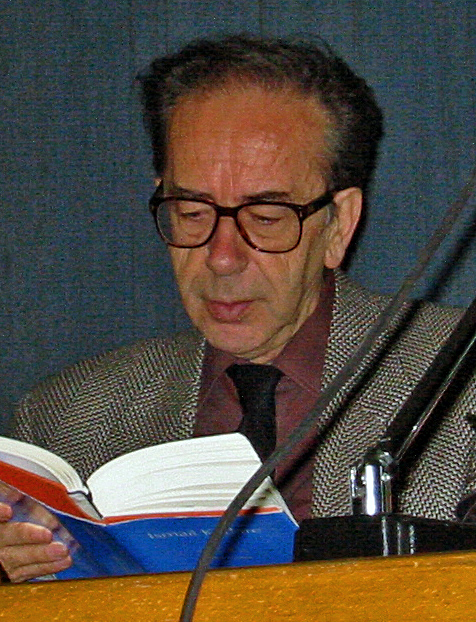
Ismail Kadare

Ismail Kadare, a prominent Albanian novelist, has repeated in his writings themes from nationalistic Albanian historiography about Albanian closeness to ancient Greeks based on Homeric ideals, writing that the Albanians are more Greek than the Greeks themselves, and initiating debates on Albanian identity viewing Albanians as being a white people and Islam as being foreign.

Rejected by modern scholarship, during the late 1990s and early 2000s the Pelasgian theory has been revived through a series of translated foreign books published on Albania and other related topics and plays an important role in Albanian nationalism today. Among them are authors such as Robert D'Angély, Edwin Everett Jacques and Mathieu Aref, whose works have revitalised 19th century ideas about Albanian descent from the ancient Pelasgians and Europeans being a "white race" originating from them. Another notable book is by the Arvanite activist Aristeidis Kollias, which rehabilitated in post-dictatorial Greek society the Arvanites (a community in Southern Greece descended from medieval Albanian settlers who today self identify as Greeks) by claiming alongside the Greeks a shared Pelasgian origin and that many Greek words had an Albanian etymology. In an Albanian context this book has been used by Albanians in Albania and Albanian immigrants in Greece as a tool to rehabilitate themselves as an ancient and autochthonous population in the Balkans to "prove" the precedence of Albanians over Greeks. The book has been used to legitimise the presence of Albanians in Greece by claiming a prominent role by Albanians in the emergence of ancient Greek civilisation and later in the creation of the Greek state, so as to counter the negative image of their communities. The revival of the alternative Pelasgian theory has occurred within the context of post-communist Greek-Albanian relations to generate cultural hegemony and historical precedence over the Greeks and sometimes toward other (historical) European cultures by Albanians. Albanian schoolbooks, mainly in relation to language, have also asserted at times that the Illyrians are the heirs of the Pelasgians.

In 2011 research conducted by Austrian linguists Stefan Schumacher and Joachim Matzinger caused controversy in Albania due to the fact that they accepted that Albanian does not originate from the language of the ancient Illyrians. Although this connection has long been supported by Albanian nationalists and is still taught in Albania from primary school through to university, it does not receive universal acceptance. However, the theory retains many supporters among Albanian academics.

The purportedly Illyrian names that the Communist regime generated continue to be used today and to be considered of Illyrian origin. The museum in the capital, Tirana, has a bust Pyrrhus of Epirus next to the bust of Teuta (an Illyrian), and under that of Scanderbeg, a medieval Albanian.

=== Contemporary Albanian identity ===
Throughout the duration of the Communist regime, national Albanian identity was constructed as being irreligious and based upon a common unitary Albanian nationality. This widely spread ideal is still present, though challenged by religious differentiation between Muslim and Christian Albanians which exists at a local level. In a post communist environment, religious affiliation to either Muslim and Christian groups is viewed within the context of historical belonging (mainly patrilineal) and contemporary social organisation as cultural communities with religious practice playing a somewhat secondary to limited role. These communities nonetheless possess perceptions of their group and others, with Muslim Albanians viewing themselves as the purest Albanians due to their supposed role in resisting Serbian geopolitical aims and preventing Albanians from being assimilated by other groups, while Catholic Albanians may view themselves as the purest Albanians due to keeping morals intact with respect to traditional customs such as the Kanun with its codes of law and honor. Catholic and Orthodox Albanians hold concerns that any possible unification of Balkan areas populated by sizable amounts of Albanian Muslims to the country would lead to an increasing "Muslimization" of Albania. Among Albanians and in particular the young, religion is increasingly not seen as important. Albania's official embrace of a civic framework of nationhood has led to minorities regarding Albania as their homeland and Albanians regarding them as fellow citizens with some differences of views among the young.

== See also ==
- Historical revisionism
- Albanophobia
- Greater Albania
- Chameria
- Origin of the Albanians
- Illyrians
- Albanian National Awakening
- Protochronism
- Historiography and nationalism
