= Tomorrica =

Region in southeastern Albania

Tomorrica (Albanian pronunciation: [tomoˈritsa]) is a traditional or ethnographic region in Central Albania, located near the border between Berat County and Elbasan County. It takes its name from Mount Tomorr.

The modern region consists of 31 villages, and it is divided by the Tomorrica river. The town of Gramsh is held to be part of the history of the region, but many may consider it to not be part of the region itself. The region is also known for its peculiar winds, known as stoçen locally, in which the clouds come close to the ground and "lie like a carpet".

The population is primarily Albanian and traditionally belonged to the Bektashi faith during Ottoman times, having been Orthodox Christian during the Middle Ages previously, although nowadays there are many irreligious people just as many other parts of Albania. It has also been affected more recently by heavy emigration, leaving entire villages deserted in the modern day. Despite its currently declining state as well as its small population and rough terrain, Tomorrica is said to have contributed greatly to Albanian history. Hence, it has been called "wretched with great people".

In the summer, there is a festival where locals ascend to the top of Mount Tomorr, where a Bektashi tekke is located. Although it is officially a Bektashi festival, non-Bektashis such as Christians and Sunnis also can and do take part.

== History ==
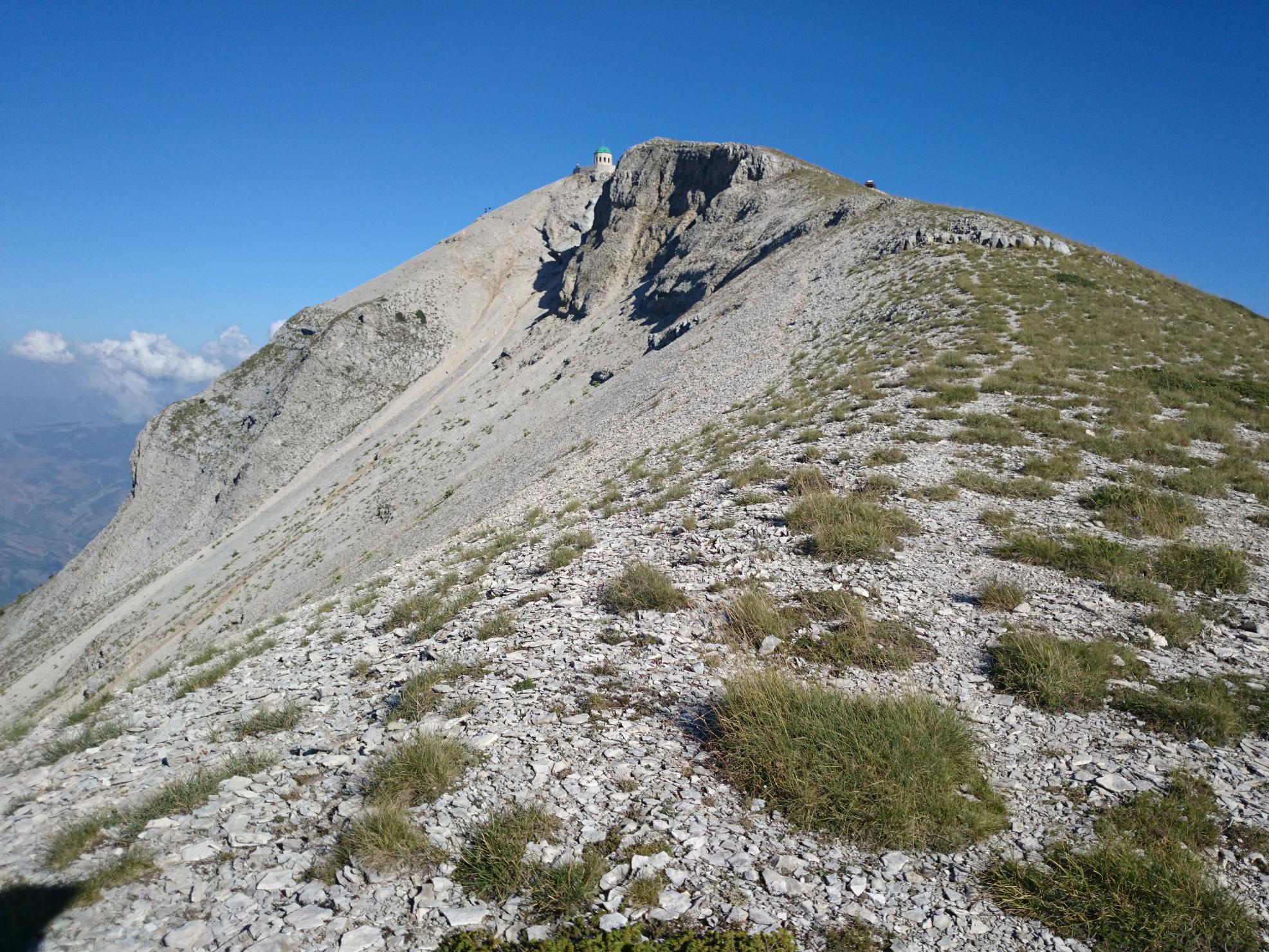
View from Zhepe of the Bektashi tekke on top of Mount Tomorr

=== Middle Ages ===
In the Middle Ages, Tomorrica was part of the domain of the Muzaka family, an Albanian noble family of Orthodox Christian faith originating from Opar which gave their name to the region of Myzeqe. According to the annals of Gjon Muzaka, Tomorrica in the 15th century consisted of 80 villages. The Muzakas had in the region the "cellar" of their possessions, and also a gold mine. At this time, Tomorrica lied along the Via Egnatia on which Venice carried its goods to Moscopole, Grevena and Thessaloniki.

After the death of Skanderbeg, many families fled to either Greece or Italy and contributed to the emergence of Arvanite and Arbëreshë populations in those lands. Within Calabria, Arbëreshë with the names Gjerba, Jerba, Barç, Zhupa, and Zhepa are held by Eqrem Cabej to have origins in Tomorrice.

=== Ottoman rule ===
During Ottoman rule, Tomorrica was a subdistrict of Skrapar. At the time of early Ottoman rule, Tomorrica had about 500 able-bodied warriors, who frequently revolted against the Porte. In 1570, a major revolt was led by Hamza-Bey from Gramshi.

The town of Gramsh bloomed in the 16th century with 400 houses and 18 shops, and was the place of residence of important beys and spahis who ruled over lands faraway in Fier, Berat, Korca, and even in Macedonia and Greece. Gramsh thus became famous not just locally, but also in the high spheres of the Ottoman Empire during this time. It was during this time that the famous Architect Kasemi lived and was chief architect of the Ottoman Empire. Later however, fortunes declined, and the loss of properties in Greece due to the Greek War of Independence was a major blow. Around the same time, the famous Frasheri family moved from Tomorrica to Dangellia, while blood feuds were taking place.

Another wave of emigration out of Tomorrica occurred in the 18th century with hundreds of families leaving. Locals fled the area and settling in Perrenjas, Mazreke in Korca County, Krushevo in Macedonia, as well as among the Arberesh populations in South Italy and Greece.

In 1833 the inhabitants of Tomorrica took over the majority of the region causing the Ottoman government to comply to rebel terms. At the end of the Ottoman Empire, two chetas affiliated with the Albanian nationalist guerrilla fighter Sali Butka were active in Tomorrica.

=== Modern era ===
The Albanian Resistance hid out in Tomorrica during World War II.

=== Mount Tomorr ===
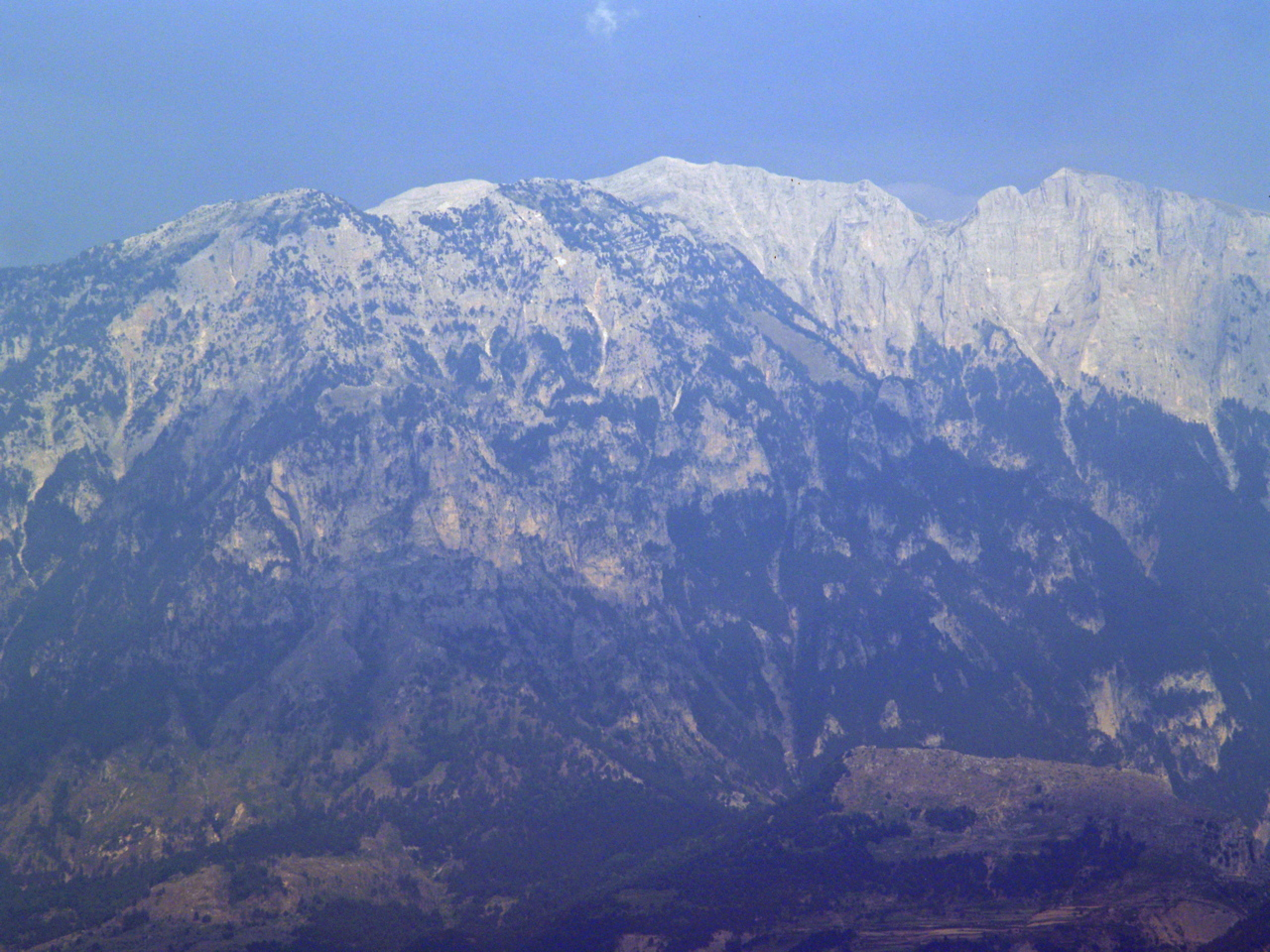
Mount Tomorr

Mount Tomorr has been the object of a significant reverence and a historical cult among Albanians, said to have pagan origins. This caused many to travel to the region historically as part of their pilgrimages to Tomorr. The cult of Tomorr was incorporated into the Bektashi faith as a syncretic element, and a Bektashi tekke stands at the top of the mountain. Tomorr was especially revered in the regions that it was visible from, which include Tomorrica itself as well as Skrapari, Dishnica, Dangellia, Myzeqeja, Sulova, Mallakastra as well as others. On August 20–25, there is a festival by which hundreds of thousands of people climb the mountain, with people of all faiths participating, and in some cases coming from places as far as Macedonia, Montenegro and Kosovo to join in.

In the 18th century, Abkhaz-Turkish Ottoman traveler Evliya Çelebi wrote that Europeans from various parts of the continent traveled to Tomorrica for its healing herbs. Notable Western Europeans who traveled to Tomorrica include Edward Lear and Antonio Balducci.

== Notable people ==
- Architect Kasemi, famous architect during the Ottoman rule.
- Ajaz Frasheri, grandfather of Naim Frasheri
- Ajli Alushani, health minister of Albania in the 1980s.
- Zylyftar Bregu, radio broadcaster.
- The father of Antonio Gramsci.
