= Demographic history of Gjirokastër County =

This article is about demographic history of Gjirokastër County, which includes the municipalities of Gjirokastër, Këlcyrë, Libohovë, Memaliaj, Përmet, Tepelenë, and Dropull.

== Gjirokastër ==
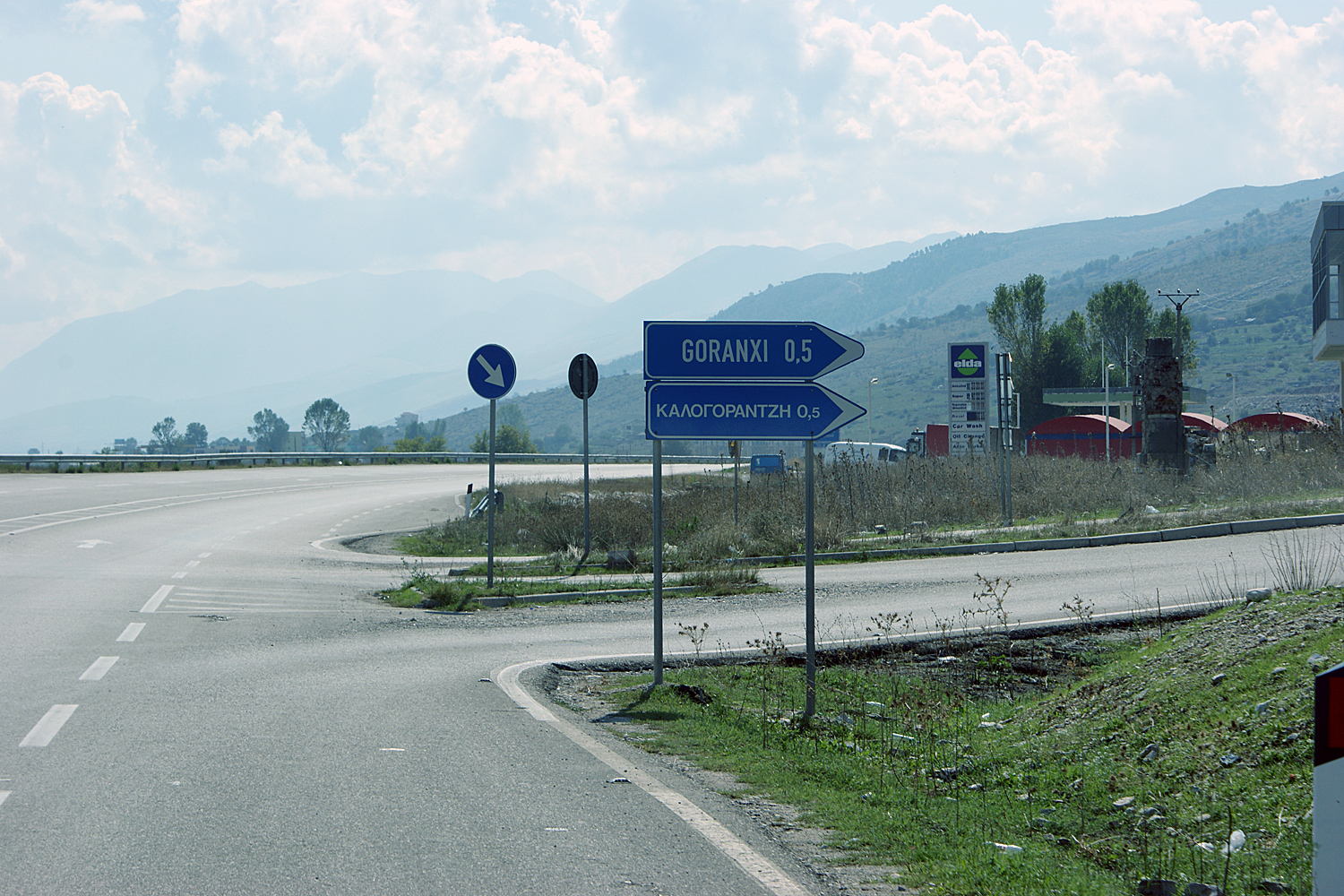
Bilingual sign in the Greek Minority Zone on the SH4.

Gjirokastër is the capital of the county and its largest settlement. It rapidly grew in the Ottoman era and it was key area of Ottoman urbanization in the Balkans. It was one of the main cities in the Janina vilayet. The population of Gjirokastër was predominantly Albanian-speaking in the final Ottoman era (late 19th/early 20th century) except for a small number of Greek-speaking families.

According to INSTAT, based on the 2011 Census, Gjirokastër Municipality was estimated to have 28,673 residents (a density of 53.91 persons/km2) living in 6,919 housing units, while the county as a whole has a total of 72,176 inhabitants. The population of the municipality includes the urban and rural population in its Administrative Units such as: Antigonë; Cepo; Lazarat; Lunxhëri; Odrie and Picar. The city of Gjirokastër itself has a resident population of 19,836 inhabitants which are a predominantly urban population. In the municipality, the population was spread out, with 16.76% from the age 0 to 14, 69.24% from 15 to 64, and 13.98% who were 65 years of age or older. As far as the city itself is concerned, the population was spread out, with 16.93% from the age 0 to 14, 70.27% from 15 to 64, and 12.78% who were 65 years of age or older. Gjirokastër is home to an ethnic Greek community that according to Human Rights Watch numbered about 4,000 out of 30,000 in 1989, although Greek spokesmen have claimed that up to 34% of the town was Greek. Gjirokastër is considered the center of the Greek community in Albania. A consulate of Greece was established in the city during this era. In fieldwork undertaken by Greek scholar Leonidas Kallivretakis in the area during 1992, the district of Gjirokastër had a mixed population consisting of Muslim Albanians, Greeks and an Orthodox Albanian population while the city had an overall Albanian majority. The district of Gjirokastër had 66.000 inhabitants of which 49% where Albanians (28% Muslims, 23% Orthodox), 40% were Greeks (all Orthodox), 12% Vlachs (all Orthodox).

== Dropull valley ==
Greeks populate all the settlements of both former municipalities of Dropull i Sipërm and Dropull i Poshtëm and also all settlements of Pogon municipality (except the village of Selckë).

== Lunxhëri ==
The present distribution of the Albanian-speaking villages bears little relation to the frontier which was drawn between Greece and Albania after the First World War. In Map 2 I have shown most of the Greek speaking villages in Albanian Epirus and some of the Albanian-speaking villages in Greek Epirus. The map is based on observations made by Clarke and myself during our travels between 1922 and 1939."; p.28-29.

In Llunxherië the villages are more compact but smaller, Shtegopul and Saraginishtë, for instance, having only fifty houses each; the people of Llunxherië are all Albanian Orthodox Christians, except those of Erind, who are partly Christian and Mohammedan, and the men, but not the women, know some Greek.

Zagorië has the same characteristics, its ten villages extending from Doshnicë to Shepr; the group is endogamous and does not marry with the people of Llunxherië. Pogoni, or Paleo-Pogoni as some people call it, consists of seven Greek-speaking villages nearly 3,000 ft. above sea-level (Poliçan, Skorë, Hlomo, Sopik, Mavrojer, Çatistë, and, on the Greek side of the frontier, Drimadhes), the biggest, Poliçan, has a population of 2,500 persons and Sopik has 300 houses. The Pogoniates normally marry only within their group, but occasionally a bride may be taken from Zagorië and then she is taught Greek."

== Përmet ==
- 1904: According to German state archives, in 1904, the district of Premeti had 8,000 inhabitants, all Albanians, divided by 5,000 Muslims and 3,000 Christians.
- 1913: According to Mary Edith Durham, writing on 3 September 1913, the district of "Premeti" was "purely Albanian".
- 1921: A 1921 document has the population divided by 12,780 Orthodox and 12,173 Muslims, a total of 25,043. Greek was spoken as a first language in few parts of the district. The northern part of the kaza was inhabited by Muslims.

== Sources ==
- Kokolakis, Mihalis (2003). Το ύστερο Γιαννιώτικο Πασαλίκι: χώρος, διοίκηση και πληθυσμός στην τουρκοκρατούμενη Ηπειρο (1820–1913) [The late Pashalik of Ioannina: Space, administration and population in Ottoman ruled Epirus (1820–1913)]. Athens: EIE-ΚΝΕ. ISBN 960-7916-11-5.
- Kallivretakis, Leonidas (1995). "Η ελληνική κοινότητα της Αλβανίας υπό το πρίσμα της ιστορικής γεωγραφίας και δημογραφίας [The Greek Community of Albania in terms of historical geography and demography]". In Nikolakopoulos, Ilias; Kouloubis Theodoros A.; Thanos M. Veremis (eds.). Ο Ελληνισμός της Αλβανίας [The Greeks of Albania]. University of Athens. ISBN 978-960-08-0054-8.
