= Dangëllia =

Dangëllia is a traditional or "ethnographic" region of Albania, located primarily around the towns of Përmet and Frashëri, although the exact definition of its borders varies. Neighboring regions include Dishnica to the North, Zagori and Këlcyra to the West, Skrapar to the South, Kolonja to the East and South, and the Greek border (Konitsa municipality) to the South.

It is known for its large and disproportionate contribution of intellectuals to the Albanian National Awakening, including most notably of all Naim Frashëri.

== History ==
In the late Ottoman Empire, the region contributed disproportionately to the Albanian National Awakening and the Albanian nationalist movement. Greek schools established in the 19th century helped the emergence of a relatively large (for the times) Albanian literary class. Many important intellectuals such as Naim Frasheri were educated in these schools. The Ottoman authorities tried to ensure that only Christian children would be educated in these schools, but Muslim children attended nevertheless. Both the Ottoman authorities and the Orthodox Church tried to thwart the opening of Albanian-language schools as well, but in the early 20th century as the Ottoman Empire fell apart, these too were opened and Albanian children began attending them, further increasing Albanian literacy.

The Albanian literacy ultimately ended up contributing very significantly to the Albanian National Awakening, increasing feelings of Albanian patriotism, and facilitated the push for independence from the Ottoman Empire in the late 19th and early 20th century. Another vehicle for propagation of Albanian nationalism were the network of Bektashi tekkes in the region, which tended to support and advocate for the movement.

After the fall of communism, the region is very heavily affected by emigration. This also occurred a century ago, when much of the population emigrated to, and then returned from, various places including Istanbul, Romania and the United States.

== Population ==
=== Ethnicity ===
The vast majority of the population is ethnically Albanian, while Aromanians are also present in Frashëri and Përmet. There is also a small Roma population, and nearby Çarshovë (sometimes included) also has both Greek and Aromanian minorities present.

=== Religion ===
The Albanian population is divided between Muslims (who are mostly Bektashi) and Christians (who are mostly Orthodox), and it is unclear which faith is larger overall. The Roma population is mostly Muslim, while the Greek population is mostly Orthodox Christian, as is the Aromanian population as well. Many Albanian families are of mixed religious adherence, including the Frasheri family which has both Bektashi Muslim and Orthodox Christian branches. Today as in the rest of Albania, there are many people who don't observe any religion.

The region has important sites for both faiths, and is dotted by Orthodox churches and Bektashi teqes built side by side. On September 5, there is a major Bektashi festival for which people travel from other parts of Albania to celebrate, and Bektashis and non-Bektashis alike participate.

=== Language ===
The population speaks a Tosk dialect of Albanian and it is typically close to the written standard of Albanian which was originally based on the dialect of the nearby town of Këlcyra. The Aromanian population speaks the Farsherot dialect of the Aromanian language, whose name comes from the town of Frashëri.

Some Roma may speak their language and Greek is spoken by some people in and around Çarshovë.
