= Architect Kasemi =

Albanian former Ottoman architect

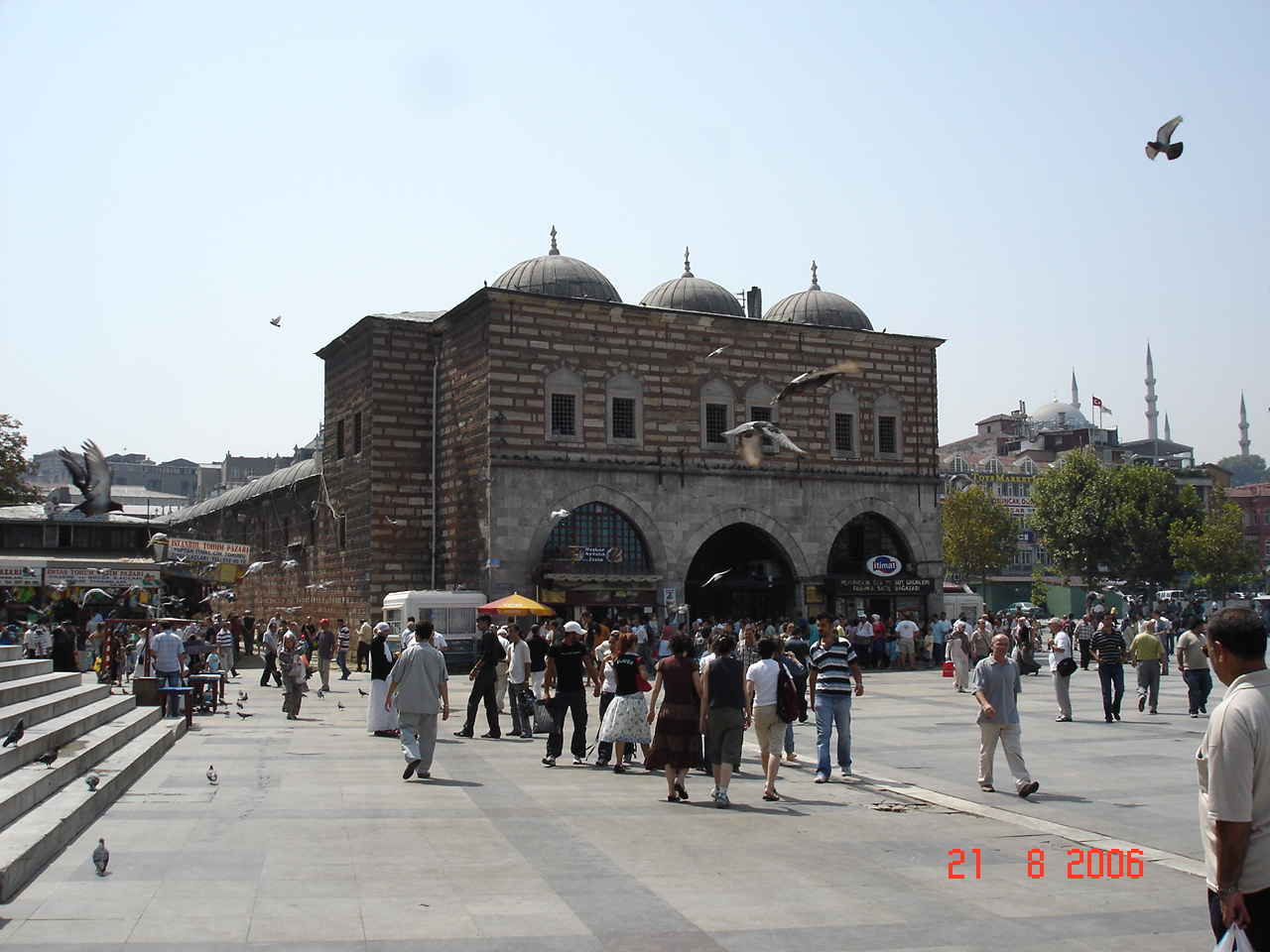
The Spice Bazaar building, completed in 1660, in Istanbul. Photo 2006.

Architect Kasëmi (Turkish: Mimar Kasım or Koca Kasım Ağa, 1570–1659) was an Albanian master of Ottoman classical architecture. born in Gramsh (Tomorricë), Albania, he graduated in architecture in Istanbul and was ranked among the closest assistants of architect Mimar Sinan.

After the death of chief court architect Hasan Agha in 1622, he became the chief architect of the Ottoman Empire, and has created original monumental works such as Baghdad Kiosk, Revan Kiosk, Tiled Kiosk within Topkapı Palace in Istanbul. He rebuilt one of the most beautiful buildings of Topkapı Palace, Basketmakers' Kiosk at Sarayburnu. Architect Kasım Agha projected the second largest covered shopping mall, the Spice Bazaar in Eminönü, which was completed in 1660 by Architect Mustafa. He constructed also many works in Albania such as inns, bridges, baths and the tracks of Medieval roads in Berat, Korcë, and so on.

Involved in court disputes, he was exiled to Gallipoli in 1644. After one year he was pardoned, and returned to the palace. Kasım Ağa excelled more in politics than in architecture. So, by helping Köprülü Mehmet Paşa to ascend to the post of grand vizier, he initiated the Köprülü era in Ottoman history. He died in 1659.

== Bibliography ==
- Meksi, Aleksandër (2016). "The Architecture of Mosques in Albania During the 15h to 19h Centuries [Arnavutluk'taki Cami Mimarisi]". In Muhammet Savaş Kafkasyalı (ed.). Balkanlarda Islam: Miadi Dolmayan Umut [Islam in the Balkans: Unexpired Hope]. TİKA. pp. 157–194. ISBN 978-605-9642-11-8.
