= Pashko Vasa =

Albanian writer (1825–1892)

Vaso Pasha
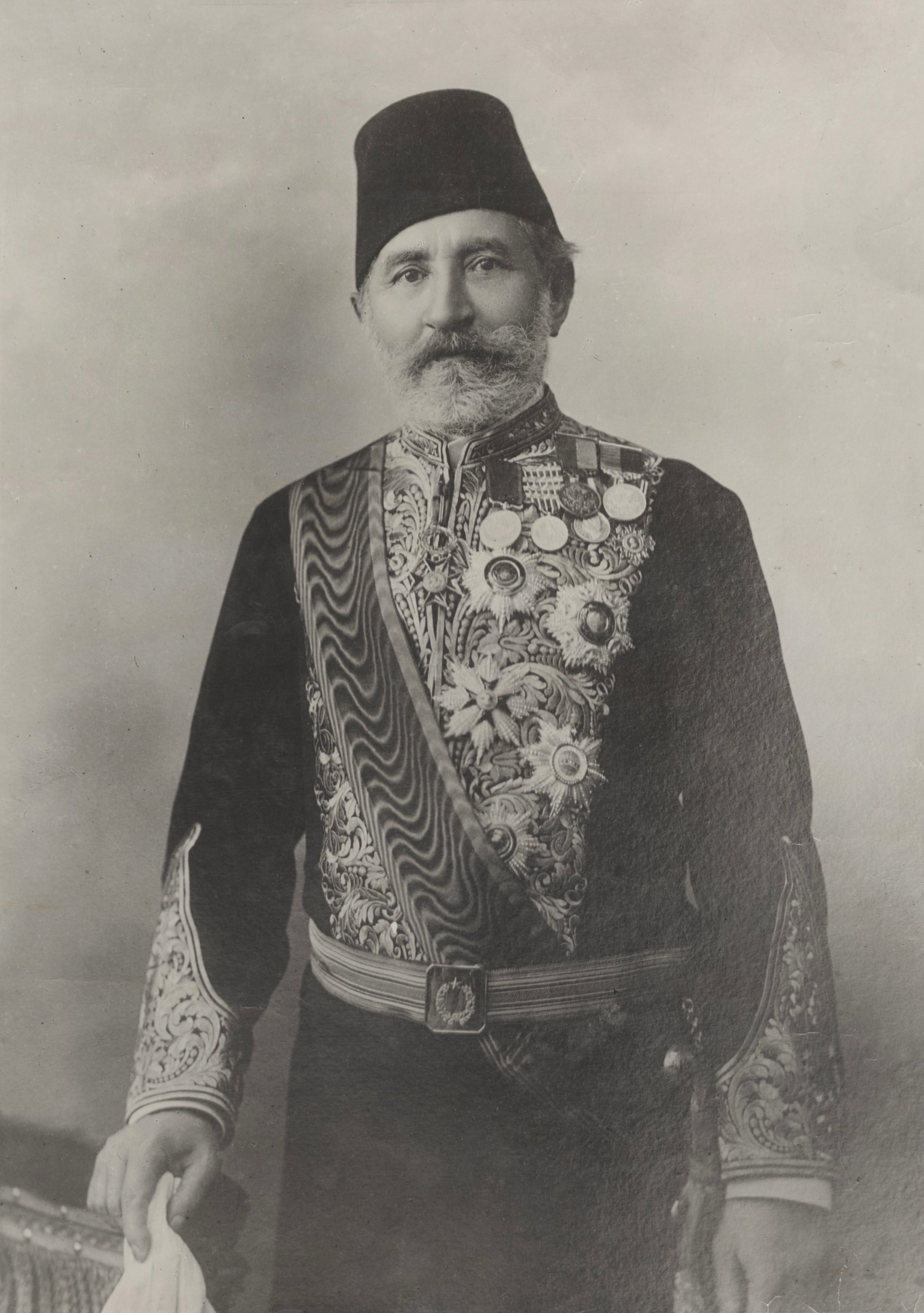
- Vaso Pasha in 1878
- Born: 17 September 1825; Shkodër, Vilayet of Scutari, Ottoman Empire
- Died: 29 June 1892 (aged 66); Beirut, Vilayet of Beirut, Ottoman Empire
- Other names: Albanus Albano; Pashko Vasa; Vaso Pashë Shkodrani; Wasa Pasha; Wassa Efendi
- Organization(s): Central Committee for Defending Albanian Rights, Society for the Publication of Albanian Writings
- Movement: Albanian National Awakening

Pashko Vasa (17 September 1825 – 29 June 1892), known as Vaso Pasha or Wassa Pasha (Arabic: واصه باشا, Albanian: Vaso pashë Shkodrani), was an Albanian writer, poet and publicist of the Albanian National Awakening, and Ottoman mutasarrif of Mount Lebanon Mutasarrifate from 1882 until his death.

== Biography ==
Vaso Pasha was born in Shkodër on September 17, 1825. He was a Catholic Albanian who held high positions within the Ottoman Empire.

=== Secretary in the British Consulate ===
From 1842 to 1847 he worked as a secretary for the British consulate in Shkodër. He there had the opportunity to perfect his knowledge of a number of foreign languages: Italian, French, Turkish and Greek. He also knew some English and Serbian, and in later years learned Arabic.

=== 1847-1848: The Italian Year ===
In 1847, he set off for Italy on the eve of turbulent events that were to take place there and elsewhere in Europe in 1848. There are two letters written by him in Bologna in the summer of 1848 in which he expresses openly republican and anti-clerical views. He later went to Venice where he took part in fighting in Marghera in October 1848, part of a Venetian uprising against the Austrians. After the arrival of Austrian troops, Pashko Vasa was obliged to flee to Ancona where, as an Ottoman citizen, he was expelled to Istanbul.

He published an account of his experience in Italy the following year in Italian-language La mia prigionia, episodio storico dell'assedio di Venezia, Istanbul 1850 (My imprisonment, historical episode from the siege of Venice).

=== 1848-1863: In Istanbul ===
In Istanbul, after an initial period of poverty and hardship, he obtained a position at the Ministry of Foreign Affairs, whence he was seconded to London for a time, to the Imperial Ottoman Embassy to the Court of St. James's. He later served the Sublime Porte in various positions of authority as a bureaucrat.

=== 1863-1864: In Bosnia-Herzegovina ===
In 1863, thanks to his knowledge of Serbian, he was appointed to serve as a secretary and interpreter to Ahmet Cevdet Pasha, Ottoman statesman and historian, on a fact-finding mission to Bosnia and Herzegovina which lasted for twenty months, from the spring of 1863 to October 1864. The events of this mission were recorded in his La Bosnie et l'Herzégovine pendant la mission de Djevdet Efendi, Constantinople 1865 (Bosnia and Herzegovina during the mission of Jevdet Efendi).

A few years later he published another now rare work of historical interest, Esquisse historique sur le Monténégro d'après les traditions de l'Albanie, Constantinople 1872 (Historical sketch of Montenegro according to Albanian traditions).

=== Administrator of Edirne vilayet ===
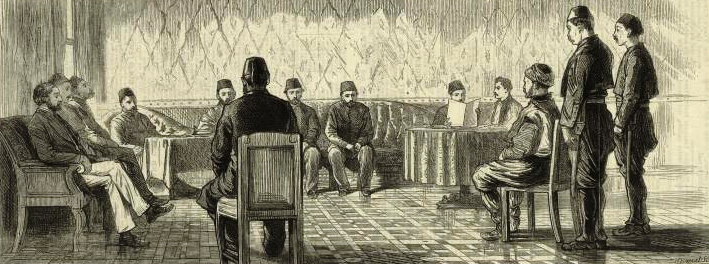
Vasa (centre, between the counsel for the prisoner and Pertev Effendi) at an Ottoman trial, 1877

In 1879, Pashko Vasa worked in Varna on the Black Sea coast in the administration of the vilayet of Edirne with Ismail Qemali. He also acquired the title of Pasha.

=== Importance to Albania ===
==== League of Prizren Organization ====
Against this hostility and enmity, we [Albanians] found ourselves in defense of the rights of [our] ethnicity-nationality.

— Pashko Vasa, 1880,

Despite his functions on behalf of the Porte, Pashko Vasa never forgot his Albanian homeland. In the autumn of 1877 he became a founding member of the Central Committee for the Defence of the Rights of the Albanian People in Istanbul which was a group of Albanian intelligentsia advocating for the territorial integrity and unity of Albanian inhabited areas in the Ottoman Empire. As a member of the Committee he met during mid-March with British ambassador Austen Henry Layard in Istanbul and urged that Albanian inhabited territories not be given to newly independent Slavic states. Through his contacts on the Committee, he also participated in the organization of the League of Prizren in 1878. He was probably the author of the Memorandum on Albanian Autonomy which had his signature alongside those of other Albanian notables and the document was submitted to the British Embassy in Constantinople. Vasa favoured the unification of Albanian-inhabited vilayets or provinces into a single vilayet of Albania within the Ottoman empire and having a "compact and strong organisation" with Albanian participation in its public administration.

==== Creation of the Albanian alphabet ====
Vasa as a member of the Committee for Defending Albanian Rights was appointed along with Sami Frashëri, Jani Vreto and Hasan Tahsini to create an Albanian alphabet which by 19 March 1879 the group approved Frashëri's 36 letter alphabet consisting mostly of Latin characters. As such Vasa published a 16-page brochure entitled L'alphabet Latin appliqué à la langue albanaise, Constantinople 1878 (The Latin alphabet applied to the Albanian language). Vasa expressed support for an alphabet of purely Latin characters. He was also a member of the Society for the Publication of Albanian Writings, founded in Constantinople on 12 October 1879, to promote the printing and distribution of the Albanian-language books.

=== Governor of Lebanon ===
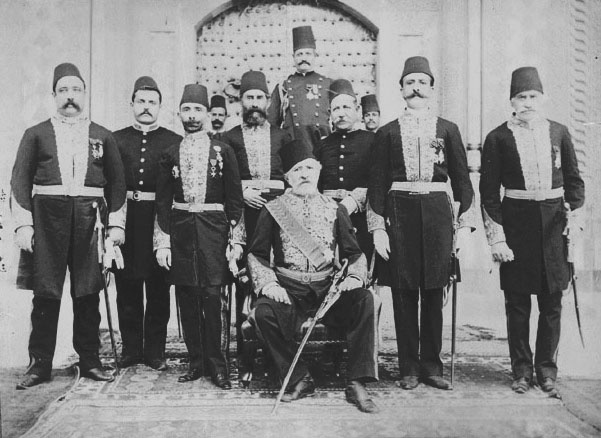
Photo from the 1880s

Sultan Abdulhamid II appointed Vasa as Mutessarıf of Mount Lebanon on 18 June 1882, a post reserved by international treaty for a Catholic of Ottoman nationality after the civil unrest and French occupation of 1860. While in Lebanon as governor, Vasa continued his work for Albanianism by publishing books on Albania in French and other publications on the Albanian language. In his post as Mutassarıf, he was initially more willing to accept French consular authority, but over his nine years in office, he came to distrust both the French Consul and the Maronite Clergy, who closely guarded their privileges. This earned him accusations of corruption, in association with his son-in-law and deputy Kupelyan Effendi. Nevertheless, he remained in office until his death in Beirut after a long illness on 29 June 1892.

In 1978, the centenary of the League of Prizren, his remains were transferred from Lebanon back to a modest grave in Shkodra.

== Literary works ==
During 1879 The Truth on Albania and Albanians was a book published by Vasa and appeared in French, English, German, Greek and Albanian translations that advocated for the Albanian cause and to inform a European readership about Albanians. In 1880 the book with a shortened title Albania and Albanians also appeared in Ottoman Turkish. The book discussed the origins of Albanians, who they were and their living conditions while arguing that they were the oldest people in the Balkans and separate from the Greeks. Vasa glorified medieval era Albanian resistance for independence and freedom to the Ottomans under Skanderbeg while celebrating Albanian military prowess as a natural fighters and ability to defend the empire. He also mentioned that after those events Albanians were an integral and loyal part of the empire having contributed many statesmen, bureaucrats, commanders and soldiers. His book criticised Ottoman governance in Albania of sending non-Albanian Ottoman officials to administer Albanians who were ineffective as they were unfamiliar with the local language, customs and other societal factors. Vasa suggested indirectly that either local Albanians could be appointed or Ottoman officials trained in the local ways of the Albanians as a solution to those issues. He attempted to impress on readers the unity of Albanians as a people with a common language, customs, history and aspirations while sidelining religious divisions and differences between the areas of Gegalik (Gegënia) and Toskalik (Toskëria). Vasa also advocated for the unification of various vilayets with Albanian populations into one administrative unit claiming that it would assist Ottoman interests as Muslim Albanians had no desire to revolt against the empire. The political Albanianism of the book overall was a response to geopolitical threats posed to Albanian inhabited territories within the empire and issues relating to the notion of rights regarding nationality for Albanians. Various outlets of the European press like The (London) Times reviewed his book and explained its contents, themes and other details about Albania and Albanians to their readership.

O moj Shqypni (Oh Albania)
"Albanians, you are killing kinfolk,
You're split in a hundred factions,
Some believe in God or Allah,
Say "I'm Turk," or "I am Latin,"
Say "I'm Greek," or "I am Slavic,"
But you're brothers, hapless people!
You have been duped by priests and hodjas
To divide you, keep you wretched....
Who has the heart to let her perish,
Once a heroine, now so weakened!
Well-loved mother, dare we leave her
To fall under foreign boot heels ?...
Wake, Albanian, from your slumber,
Let us, brothers, swear in common
And not look to church or mosque,
The Albanian's faith is Albanianism [to be Albanian]!

— Excerpt from O moj Shqypni by Vaso Pasha, 1878.

To make the Albanian language better known and to give other Europeans an opportunity to learn it, he published a Grammaire albanaise à l'usage de ceux qui désirent apprendre cette langue sans l'aide d'un maître, Ludgate Hill 1887 (Albanian grammar for those wishing to learn this language without the aid of a teacher), one of the rare grammars of the period. Pashko Vasa was also the author of a number of literary works of note. The first of these is a volume of Italian verse entitled Rose e spine, Constantinople 1873 (Roses and thorns), forty-one emotionally charged poems (a total of ca. 1,600 lines) devoted to themes of love, suffering, solitude and death in the traditions of the romantic verse of his European predecessors Giacomo Leopardi, Alphonse de Lamartine and Alfred de Musset. Among the subjects treated in these meditative Italian poems, two of which are dedicated to the Italian poets Francesco Petrarch and Torquato Tasso, are life in exile and family tragedy, a reflection of Pashko Vasa's own personal life. His first wife, Drande, whom he had married in 1855, and four of their five children died before him, and in later years too, personal misfortune continued to haunt him.

In 1884, shortly after his appointment as Governor General of the Lebanon, his second wife from Shkodër, Katerina Bonati, died of tuberculosis, as did his surviving daughter Roza in 1887. Bardha de Témal, scènes de la vie albanaise, Paris 1890 (Bardha of Temal, scenes from Albanian life), is a French-language novel which Pashko Vasa published in Paris under the pseudonym of Albanus Albano the same year as Naim Frashëri's noted verse collection Lulet e verës (The Flowers of Spring) appeared in Bucharest. 'Bardha of Temal,' though not written in Albanian, is, after Sami Frashëri's much shorter prose work 'Love of Tal'at and Fitnat,' the oldest novel written and published by an Albanian and is certainly the oldest such novel with an Albanian theme. Focusing on the habits and customs of Gheg Albanians in Northern Albania the novel set in Shkodra during 1842, is classically structured roman-feuilleton, rather excessively sentimental for modern tastes and follows the tribulations of the fair but married Bardha and her lover, the young Aradi. It was written not only as an entertaining love story but also with a view to informing the western reader of the customs and habits of the northern Albanians. Bardha is no doubt the personification of Albania itself, married off against her will to the powers that be. Above and beyond its didactic character and any possible literary pretensions the author might have had, 'Bardha of Temal' also has a more specific political background. It was interpreted by some Albanian intellectuals at the time as a vehicle for discrediting the Gjonmarkaj clan who, in cahoots with the powerful abbots of Mirdita, held sway in the Shkodra region. It is for this reason perhaps that Pashko Vasa published the novel under the pseudonym Albanus Albano. The work is not known to have had any particular echo in the French press of the period.

Though most of Pashko Vasa's publications were in French and Italian, there is one poem, the most influential and perhaps the most popular ever written in Albanian, which has ensured him his deserved place in Albanian literary history, the famous O moj Shqypni e mjera Shqypni (Oh Albania, Poor Albania). Frustrated by Albanian societal divisions, this stirring appeal by Vasa for a national awakening and unity transcending religious and other identities is thought to have been written in the period between 1878, the dramatic year of the League of Prizren, and 1880. Vasa overall continued to inform European readers on Albanians and Albania through his French publications, as he had done from the time of the Unionist Societies.

== Published works ==
Pashko Vasa on a 2026 stamp of Albania

- Rose e spine (1873)
- Études Sur L'Albanie Et Les Albanais (Constantinopol, 1879)
- Grammaire albanaise à l'usage de ceux qui désirent apprendre cette langue sans l'aide d'un maître, (London, 1887)
- L'alphabet Latin appliqué à la langue albanaise, (Constantinopol, 1878)
- Bosnie et Hercegovine pendant la mission de Djevdet Effendi, (Constantinopol, 1865)
- La vérité sur l'Albanie et les Albanais, (Paris, 1879)
- Esquisse historique sur le Monténégro d'après les traditions de l'Albanie, (Constantinopol, 1872)
- O moj Shqypni (1880)
- Barda de Témal, (Paris, 1890)

== See also ==
- Albanian literature
- Rilindja Kombëtare
- O moj Shqypni on YouTube (Albanian)
