= Mythos-Magazin =

Mythos-Magazin, or Mythos. Journal für Ästhetik, is an online literary magazine, founded by Peter Tepe, and published by the University of Düsseldorf. The magazine was founded in 2005 and is currently co-edited by Stefan Oehm and Luca Viglialoro. The magazine underwent a rebranding in July 2025 and changed its name from "Mythos-Magazin" to "Mythos. Journal für Ästhetik". Topics published by the magazine have included The Sorrows of Young Werther, other works of Goethe, and the myth of Skanderbeg.
