= Myth of Skanderbeg =

Constitutive myth of Albanian nationalism

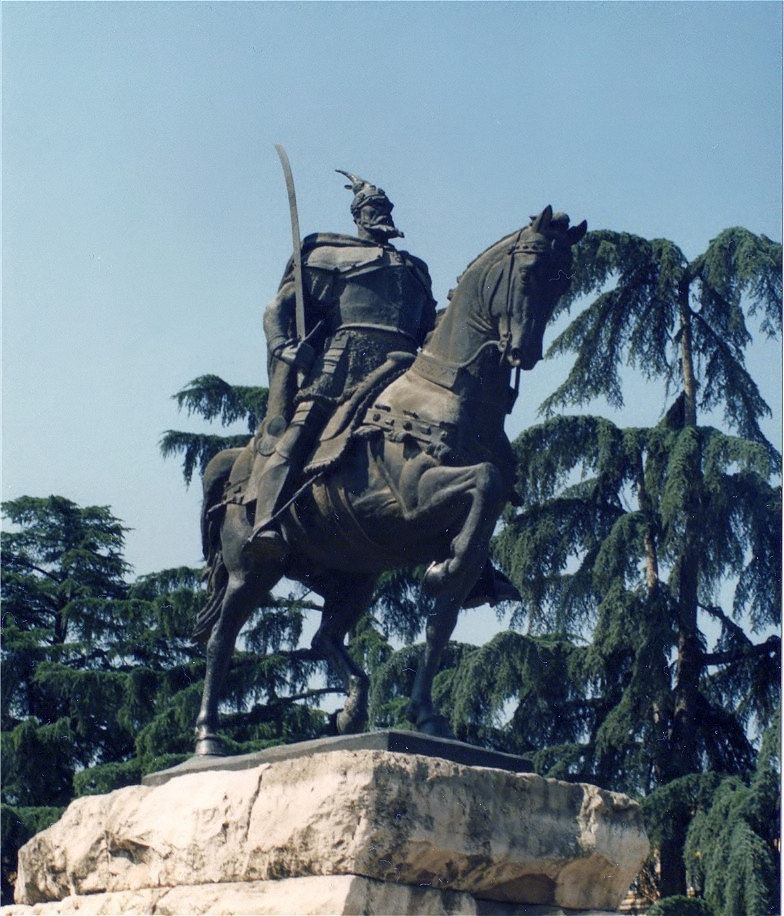
Skanderbeg's monument in Tirana

The myth of Skanderbeg is one of the main constitutive myths of Albanian nationalism. In the late nineteenth century, during the Albanian struggle and the Albanian National Awakening, Skanderbeg became a symbol for the Albanians and he was turned into a national Albanian hero and myth.

After the death of Skanderbeg, the Arbëresh (Albanians) migrated from the Balkans to southern Italy. There his memory and exploits survived and were maintained among them in their musical repertoire. Skanderbeg was transformed into a nation building myth by Albanian nationalist writers and thus his deeds were transformed into a mixture of facts, half truths and folklore. The myth of Skanderbeg is the only myth of Albanian nationalism that is based on a person; the others are based on ideas, abstract concepts, and collectivism. The myth of Skanderbeg was not created by Albanian intellectuals but was already part of the Arbereshe folklore and collective memory. According to Oliver Jens Schmitt, "there are two different Skanderbegs today: the historic Skanderbeg, and a mythic national hero as presented in Albanian schools and by nationalist intellectuals in Tirana and Pristina."

== History ==
=== Antemurale Christianitatis ===
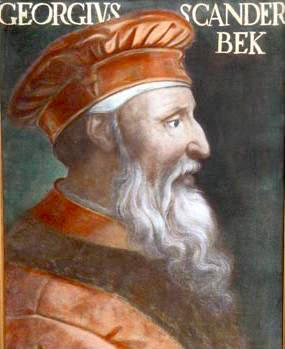
Skanderbeg's painting

Skanderbeg is built in part of the antemurale myth complex which portrays Albanians united by Skanderbeg as protectors of the nation and Christendom against "invading Turks". In the 16th century, the "Defence against the Turks" had become a central topic in East Central and South East Europe. It was put in functional use and served as a propaganda tool and to mobilize religious feelings of the population. People who participated in campaigns against the Ottoman Empire were referred to as “antemurale Christianitatis” (the protective wall of Christianity). The Pope Calixtus III gave Skanderbeg the title Athleta Christi, or Champion of Christ. Furthermore, according to Louise Marshall, during the 18th century the myth of Skanderbeg was moulded and transformed to suit the taste and the anxieties of the British readers.

Under the influence of the myth of Skanderbeg and antemurale myth, the Albanian Catholic clergy seems to understand the figure of Mother Teresa as Skanderbeg's ideological heir who completes his task of guarding the boundaries of Catholicism and Albanianism, introducing a new era after the end of glorious era that culminated with Skanderbeg. In contrast to the Skanderbeg myths of Albanian Christians, the myth of Skanderbeg of Albania's Muslim community had a positive outcome because the glory of the Illyrian era did not end with Skanderbeg, but continued into the Ottoman era.

=== Skanderbeg and Serbo-Montenegrin expansionism ===
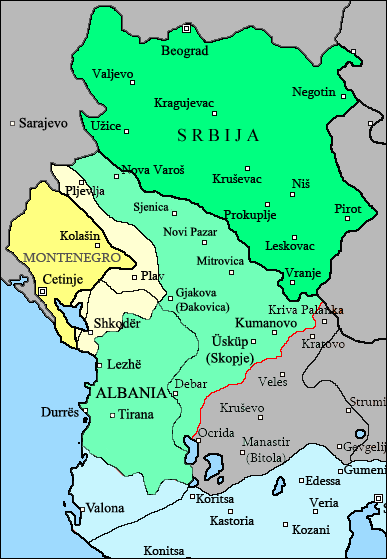
Serbo-Montenegrin-Greek-Ottoman occupation of Albania.

Serbian propaganda circles, often contradictorily, used Skanderbeg as a symbol of joint Serbian-Albanian progress (1866). On the other hand, forty years later, in a different political environment, the faded memory of Skanderbeg among a large portion of Albanians was used as evidence of a lack of an ethnic identity and even the alleged Serbian character of the medieval hero. Spiridon Gopčević, a proponent of Serbian expansionism in the Ottoman Balkans, claimed that northern Albanians are actually Serbs and Skanderbeg's main motivation was his feelings of Serb national injury.

In Montenegro, a country which had tribal structures similar to the ones in northern Albania and also had a similar mentality, Skanderbeg was celebrated as a Slavic hero, a concept which was incorporated into the movement to justify an expansion of Montenegro into northern Albania. By the end of the 19th century, one could find a wide dissemination of brochures with Skanderbeg being presented as a hero along the Montenegro-Albania border. The myth is particularly popular in Kuči tribe where the Drekalović brotherhood, also known as Novokuči (New Kuči) claims descent from him.

The claim that Skanderbeg was Slav was first made by a German who misread a document of 1368 in Serbian. Among the signatories were a Branilo (a Slav Christian name) of Vlora and a Kastrioti of Kanina. He produced Branilo Kastrioti as Scanderbeg's Serbian great grandfather. This reading is based on a mistaken translation by Karl Hopf in the 19th century and has been discredited ever since. It became popular in Serbian propaganda circles again in the 1980s, right before the crisis in Kosovo, where Serb ultra nationalists again celebrated Skanderbeg as "the son of Ivan, Đorđe Kastriot, the Serbian horseman of Albania." During the 2000s Skanderbeg's origins was a topic on internet chat rooms and that the figure was over time increasingly included into Serbian national narratives.

=== Skanderbeg during the Albanian National Awakening ===
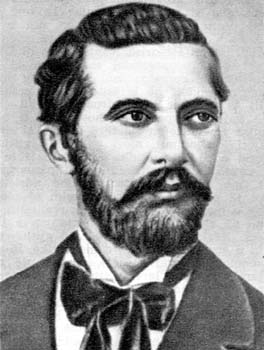
In "Istori'e Skenderbeut" written by Naim Frasheri in 1898 Skanderbeg's figure assumed a new dimension of the Albanian national hero.

The wars between the Ottomans and Skanderbeg along with his death resulted in the migration of Albanians to southern Italy and creation of the Arbëresh community (Italo-Albanians). The memory of Skanderbeg and his exploits was maintained and survived among the Arbëresh through songs, in the form of a Skanderbeg cycle. Skanderbeg's fame survived in Christian Europe for centuries, while in largely Islamized Albania it largely faded, though his memory was still alive in oral tradition. It was only in the 19th century, in the period of the Albanian National Revival, that Skanderbeg was rediscovered and raised to the level of national mythm for all Albanians. During the late nineteenth century the symbolism of Skanderbeg increased in an era of Albania national struggles that turned the medieval figure into a national Albanian hero. The Arbereshe passed their traditions concerning Skanderbeg to Albanian elites outside Italy. Thus, the myth of Skanderbeg was not fabricated by Albanian intellectuals but it was part of the Arbereshe folklore and collective memory. Although Skanderbeg had already been used in the construction of the Albanian national code, especially in communities of Arbėresh, it was only in the final years of the 19th century with the publication of the work of Naim Frashëri "Istori'e Skenderbeut" in 1898 that his figure assumed a new dimension. Naim Frasheri was the biggest inspiration and guide for most Albanian poets and intellectuals.

Albanian nationalists needed an episode from medieval history for the centre of the Albanian nationalistic mythology and they chose Skanderbeg, in the absence of the medieval kingdom or empire. The figure of Skanderbeg was subjected to Albanisation, and he was presented as a national hero. Later books and periodicals continued this theme, and nationalist writers transformed history into myth. The religious aspect of Skanderbeg's struggle against Muslims was minimized by Albanian nationalists because it could divide Albanians and undermine their unity as Albanians are both Muslims and Christians. In the late Ottoman period Albanian intellectuals claimed that Skanderbeg had overcome self interest and religious loyalty through service and loyalty toward an Albanian nation, itself absent in the fifteenth century. There was significant effort of the Albanian historiography to adapt the facts about Skanderbeg to meet the requests of the contemporary ideology. Although the myth of Skanderbeg had little to do with the reality it was incorporated in works about history of Albania. At the height of the Rilindja movement, in 1912, Skanderbeg's flag was raised in Vlorë.

=== Skanderbeg in Greek literature ===
Skanderbeg was a figure featured in 19th century Greek literature. Papadopoulo Vretto published a biography on Skanderbeg and presented him as a defender of Christianity against the Muslim Ottomans and a 'proud Epirotan' descendant of king Pyrrhus of ancient Epirus. The book itself did not claim Skanderbeg as Greek, yet the text became influential in shaping a long tradition within Greek literature that appropriated him as a Greek national hero and patriot. Greek revolutionaries read the book and commemorated his Skanderbeg actions as ones of Greek and Christian pride. At the time as the idea of an Albanian nation consolidated Papadopoulo's book spread to the Arbereshë (Albanian) diaspora of southern Italy and it influenced Italo-Albanian intellectuals who sought to elevate figures such as Skanderbeg as an Albanian hero and differentiate themselves from Greeks.

=== Skanderbeg in Macedonian narratives ===
From the early 2000s, the figure of Skanderbeg and his ethnic background has attracted the attention of Macedonian academia and ethnic Macedonians. The popularity of Skanderbeg and his status as a "national hero" has grown in Macedonia and ideas exist that he had Slavic origins, lived in a Slavic context or was from Tetovo. Skanderbeg has featured in a 2006 novel by philosopher and translator Dragi Mihajlovski that told the narratives of thirteen people and their views of him. Petar Popovski, an essayist wrote a 1200-page book that claimed he located historical evidence of Skanderbeg's ethnic and national Macedonian origins. Popovski also criticised Macedonian authorities for not incorporating Skanderbeg as part of the national Macedonian genealogy. The majority of Macedonian academia rejects such claims over Skanderbeg as not based on historical evidence. During the 2000s Skanderbeg's origins was a topic among Macedonians on internet chat rooms and that the figure was over time being more included into Macedonian national narratives. Rumors also existed in Macedonia that a statue dedicated to Skanderbeg as a "Macedonian junak" might be erected in Prilep by government authorities.

=== Exploits of Skanderbeg's figure ===
Skanderbeg's name, horse, and sword summarize exploits of his figure:

1. Nomen est omen is used in the exploitation of Skanderbeg's figure by connecting his name with Alexander the Great, who defended his territory, and implying that Skanderbeg also struggled to defend his territory from the Ottoman Empire.
2. The sword used by Skanderbeg was a present of the sultan and was endowed with magical powers.
3. The horse connects the mythological hero with both earthly and spiritual powers, also making the hero look taller. The neighing of Skanderbeg's horse caused terror among his enemies.

At the dawn of the 20th century, the figure of Skanderbeg as the Albanian national hero took another dimension through the appearance of pretenders to the throne who claimed his descent. Being aware of the myth of Skanderbeg, many pretenders on the Albanian throne, like the German nobleman Wilhelm of Wied and several European adventurers, named themselves and their descendants after Skanderbeg. Both Zogu and Enver Hoxha presented themselves as heirs of Skanderbeg. One of the important reasons for the regime of Enver Hoxha to emphasize the interest in Skanderbeg's period was to justify the building of a totalitarian dictatorship. Albanian historians intensively mythologized Skanderbeg during communist regime to give legitimacy to the policy of the government.

The main components of various interpretations of the picture of Skanderbeg are still present, except that communist ideological components installed by Hoxha's regime have been replaced by nationalist ones. In some historical and commercial publications, Adem Jashari (1955—1998) is portrayed as the new Albanian national hero in a historical succession of Skanderbeg.

Transformation of Skanderbeg into a national symbol served both national cohesion and as an argument for Albania's cultural affinity to Europe because the national narrative of Skanderbeg symbolized the sacrifice of the Albanians in "defending Europe from Asiatic hordes". Pro-European public discourse in modern Albania uses the myth of Skanderbeg as evidence of Albania's European identity.

== Legacy ==
As a national hero, Albanian politicians in power have over time promoted the figure of Skanderbeg and he has been revered and acclaimed in oral history. The exploits of Skanderbeg are celebrated as the struggle for freedom from foreign control, ethnic and national Albanian accomplishment, the wisdom of a past Albanian ruler, a figure that transcends multi-ethnic Balkan divisions and a regional contributor to European history. The role of Skanderbeg as a Christian figure that fought against the (Muslim) Ottoman conquest of the continent has been deemphasised over time.

Because of the insufficient primary sources it is difficult to pin down the "hero of the Albanian nation" status of Skanderbeg. Both Albanian communists and Christians have constructed Skanderbeg into a national figure. Contemporary Muslim Albanians deemphasize the (Christian) religious heritage of Skanderbeg by viewing him as a defender of the nation and he is promoted as an Albanian symbol of Europe and the West.

Since Skanderbeg occupies the central place in Albanian national myths, it complicates his critical analysis by the historians. Those who performed a critical analysis of Skanderbeg, as Vienna historian Oliver Jens Schmitt did, would quickly be accused of committing sacrilege and sullying the Albanian national honor.

An emphasis on Skanderbeg's struggle and conflict with the Ottomans as a symbol to create a unitary Albanian state has volatile implications because it is not restricted to Albania as was under the government of Hoxha, but encompasses the wider area inhabited by Albanians within the Balkans. The myth of Skanderbeg represents the main ingredient of the debate about future aspirations of the Albanian nation.

== Skanderbeg myth in academic research ==
Myth of Skanderbeg was included in the program of the following academic conferences:

- The Role of Myths in History and Development in Albania, held in London, United Kingdom, on 11–13 June 1999
- The myth of Skanderbeg, held in Palermo, Italy on 29 March 2007
- A living Skanderbeg, the multidisciplinary analysis of the myth, historical facts and current knowledge about George Kastrioti Skanderbeg, held in Lecce, Italy, on 12–13 March 2009
- The lexicon of identity and exclusion, held in Palazzo Chiaramonte, University of Palermo, Palermo, Italy, on 13–14 October 2009 with The Hero and the Nation: On the Various Interpretations of Skanderbeg’s Myth
- George Kastriot Skanderbeg: the history and image held on 28 May 2010 in Durrës, Albania
- Recycling Myths, Inventing Nations, held on 14–16 July 2010 at Gregynog Hall, the University of Wales Conference Centre, UK

The key question in scientific research of the myth of Skanderbeg is not its historical basis, or whether it has one at all, but the investigation of its meanings and purposes.

== See also ==
- National myth
- Historiography and nationalism

== Literature ==
- Babinger, Franz (1992) [1978]. Mehmed the Conqueror and His Time. Bollingen Series 96. Translated from the German by Ralph Manheim. Edited, with a preface, by William C. Hickman. Princeton, New Jersey: Princeton University Press. ISBN 0-691-09900-6.
- Centlivres, Pierre; Daniel Fabre; Françoise Zonabend (1998), "L'Albanais George Castrioti Skanderbeg: heros mythique ou civil", La fabrique des héros (in French), France: Ministere de la Culture et de la Communication, pp. 181–188, ISBN 2-7351-0819-8
- di Miceli, Francesca; Zef Chiaramonte; Franca Cuccia; Giuseppe Barbaccia; Ernesto Schiro, Miti e Cultura Arbereshe (PDF) (in Italian), Italy: Centro Internazionale Studi sul Mito Delegazione Siciliana
- Free, Jan, "Skanderbeg als historisher Mythos" (PDF), Von den Schwierigkeiten historischer Bezugnahme: Der albanische Nationalheld Skanderbeg (in German), Düsseldorf: Mythos-Magazin
- Cocco, Emilio (2002), "Mit o Skenderbegu: Onostranska enotnost in izgnanstvo", Mitologije Arberešev [Arberesh Myths], Časopis za kritiko znanosti (in Slovenian), vol. 209/210, pp. 145–159, OCLC 446379330
- Misha, Gjergj; Pierre Centlivres; Daniel Fabre; Françoise Zonabend (1998), "L'Albanais George Castrioti Skanderbeg : héros mythique ou civil", La fabrique des héros (in French), vol. 181, Paris: Éd. de la Maison des sciences de l'homme, pp. 181–188, ISBN 9782735108190, OCLC 716151465
- Schwandner-Sievers, Stephanie; Bernd Jürgen Fischer; Roderick Bailey; Isa Blumi; Nathalie Clayer; Ger Dujizings; Denisa Costovicova; Annie Lafontaine; Fatos Lubonja; Nicola Mai; Noel Malcolm; Piro Misha; Mariella Pandolfi; Gilles de Rapper; Fabian Schmidt; George Shopflin; Elias G. Skoulidas; Alex Standish; Galia Vatchinova (2002), Albanian identities: myth and history, USA: Indiana University Press, ISBN 0-253-34189-2
- Kabashi, Artemida (August 2005), "The myth of Skanderbeg in the memory of the Arberesh of Arberesh and Albania" (PDF), The memory of George Castriota Scanderbeg among the Arberesh of Italy: A study on the role of Diaspora in the creation of Albanian national identity, Texas, USA
- Ypi, Lea L. (November 2007), "The Albanian Renaissance in Political Thought: Between the Enlightenment and Romanticism" (PDF), East European Politics & Societies, 21 (4): 661–680, doi:10.1177/0888325407307259, S2CID 144718966
- Altimari, Francesco (2007), "Der Skanderbegmythos in der italoalbanischen Literatur der Rilindja-Bewegung [Myth of Skanderbeg in literature of the Renaissance Arbëresh]", in Bardhyl Demiraj (ed.), Nach 450 Jahren : Buzukus "Missale" und seine Rezeption in unserer Zeit, Otto Harrassowitz Verlag, pp. 308, 309, ISBN 978-3-447-05468-3, OCLC 150414642
- Cela, Alisa (2008), Die politische Instrumentalisierung des Skanderbegmythos (The political instrumentalization of Myth of Skanderbeg) (in German), Wien: Universität Wien, Fakultät für Sozialwissenschaften
- King, Russell; Mai, Nicola (2008), Out of Albania: From Crisis Migration to Social Inclusion in Italy, Berghahn Books, ISBN 978-1-84545-544-6
- Endresen, Cecilie (2010), Oliver Jens Schmitt (ed.), Religion und Kultur im albanischsprachigen Südosteuropa, vol. 4, Frankfurt am Main, Berlin, Bern, Bruxelles, New York, Oxford, Wien, ISBN 978-3-631-60295-9, OCLC 713373642
- Endresen, Cecilie (2015), "The Nation and the Nun: Mother Teresa, Albania's Muslim Majority and the Secular State", Islam and Christian–Muslim Relations, 26 (1): 53–74, doi:10.1080/09596410.2014.961765, S2CID 143946229
- Genesin, Monica; Joachim Matzinger; Giancarlo Vallone (March 2010), The Living Skanderbeg: The Albanian Hero between Myth and History (1 ed.), Hamburg: Kovac, J., ISBN 978-3-8300-4416-1
- Nixon, Nicola (March 2010), Always already European: The figure of Skënderbeg in contemporary Albanian nationalism, National Identities, vol. 12, March 2010, Routledge, pp. 1–20, Bibcode:2010NatId..12....1N, doi:10.1080/14608940903542540, S2CID 144772370
- Nitsiakos, Vassilis (2010), On the Border - Transborder Mobility, Ethnic Groups and Boundaries along the Albanian-Greek Frontier, Berlin: Lit Verlag, ISBN 978-3-643-10793-0, OCLC 700517914
- Hetzer, Armin (2011), "Die Funktion des Skanderbeg-Mythos für die nationale Identität der Albaner. [The function of Scanderbeg myth for the national identity of the Albanians]", in Lauer Reinhard (ed.), Erinnerungskultur in Südosteuropa : Bericht über die Konferenzen der Kommission für interdisziplinäre Südosteuropa (in German), Berlin; Boston: de Gruyter, pp. 105–118, doi:10.1515/9783110253054.105, ISBN 978-3-11-025305-4
- Gorani, Dukagjin (April 2012), Orientalist Ethnonationalism: From Irredentism to Independentism. Discourse analysis of the Albanian ethnonationalist narrative about the National Rebirth (1870-1930) and Kosovo Independence (1980-2000) (PDF), Cardiff, United Kingdom: Cardiff University, pp. 187–198, OCLC 795108866
- Ragaru, Nadege (2008). "The Political Uses and Social Lives of "National Heroes": Controversies over Skanderbeg's Statue in Skopje". Südosteuropa. 56 (4): 522–555.
