= Battle of Mestre =

Sortie on Mestre
- Part of the First Italian War of Independence
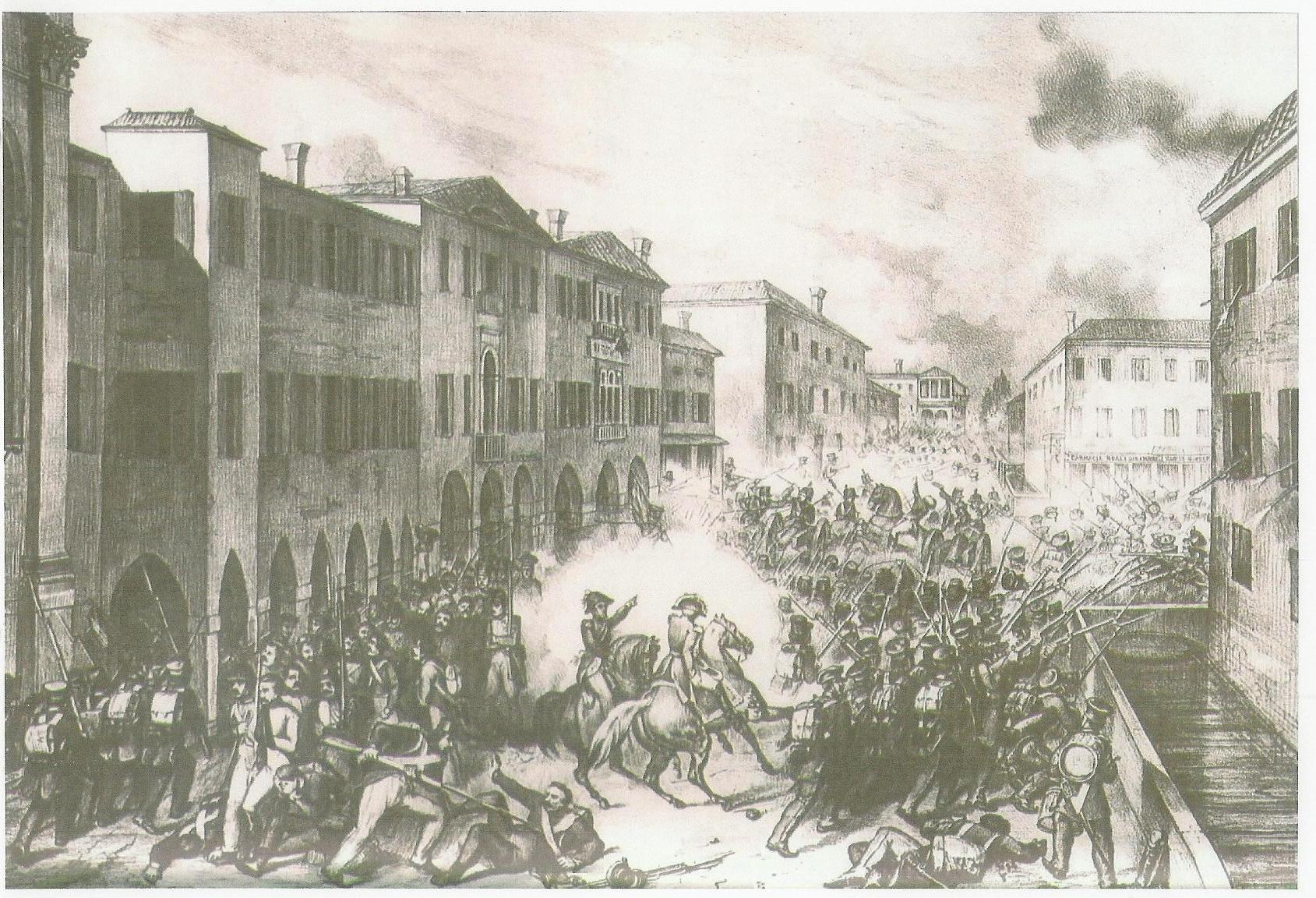
- The Venetian sortie on Mestre, 1848
Date	27 October 1848
Location	Mestre, Venetia
Result	Venetian victory

Belligerents
Rep. of San Marco	Austrian Empire

Commanders and leaders
Guglielmo Pepe; Girolamo Ulloa	Generalmajor Mitis

Strength
2,000–2,500 mostly volunteers	2,000–3,000 austrian garrison

Casualties and losses
87 killed 163 wounded	97 killed 200 killed & wounded 303 captured 3 cannons lost

The sortie on Mestre occurred during the revolutionary year of 1848 on October 27.
Italian volunteers charged the Austrian fortification, took the town and withdrew, with the loot of three baggage-waggons, eight horses, large quantity of ammunition and the military chest, back to the fort at Marghera.

== Prelude ==
A narrative on the event of the sortie on mestre, was written by Lieutenant-General Pepe, and published by Henry Colburn in 1850, London:

"On the morning of the 27th, before dawn, the General-in-Chief, surrounded by his staff, from the lunette No. 12 in the fort of Malghera, observed the movement of three columns, which contained in all about 2000 bayonets. That on the left consisted of 450 men of the fifth Venetian legion, commanded by its colonel, D'Amigo, and embarked on a number of boats; it was preceded by five pirogues and two scouts, under the orders of Captain Basilesso of the navy. These boats, with their artillery, were intended to facilitate the landing of our men in Fuseria."

"The Colonel had instructions to occupy that post, and afterwards the part of Boaria which adjoins the city of Mestre, so as to form a reserve for the centre column. This column consisted of 900 men, commanded by Colonel Morandi, and composed of Lombard and Bolognese volunteers; its orders were to dislodge the enemy entrenched on the railroad, and then to occupy Mestre by force. The right column of 650 men, formed of the free Italian battalion, and the chasseurs of the Upper Reno, commanded by Colonel Zambeccari, had orders to take a barricade erected on the narrow banks of the canal of Mestre, and defended by two guns, and by considerable numbers of infantry posted in the neighbouring houses, which were fortified with loopholes."

== The sortie ==
A narrative on the event of the sortie on mestre, was written by Lieutenant-General Pepe, and published by Henry Colburn in 1850, London:

"The strength of the enemy was about 3000 men on the whole line, besides 2000 entrenched in Mestre, which was also defended by many field-pieces, and by chasseurs ready to fire from the houses."

"The centre column was stopped by the fire of the muskets, and by the artillery of the enemy. The General-in-Chief despatched Colonel Ulloa with one hundred gendarmes of the reserve, and with this reinforcement he rallied and urged on the column at the pas de charge; and they penetrated into the city. They were stopped a second time; but in spite of the obstinate resistance they encountered, and the great loss they sustained, they advanced onwards."

"The enemy, after losing part of their artillery, defended themselves from the houses. Captain Sirtori, Major Rosaroll, and Captain Cattabene, bold even to temerity, undertook with a handful of brave Lombards to drive out the Austrian's house by house, and thus opened the way to our troops who occupied the city militarily."

"But what was still better, was to have proved that the Italian volunteers, who only a few months before had taken arms for the first time, commanded by officers for the most part new to the profession, had beaten the Austrians, who were superior in number, well entrenched, obstinately defended, and prepared overnight to receive us, and who made use of the loop-holed houses as a second line of defence."

== Aftermath ==
Part of the loot taken from Mestre, included the official Austrian war correspondence. Amongst which the Venetians discovered that the Austrians had been informed of the projected attack, and had made all the necessary arrangements to meet it, which proved that the Venetians had a spy amongst their ranks.
