= O moj Shqypni =

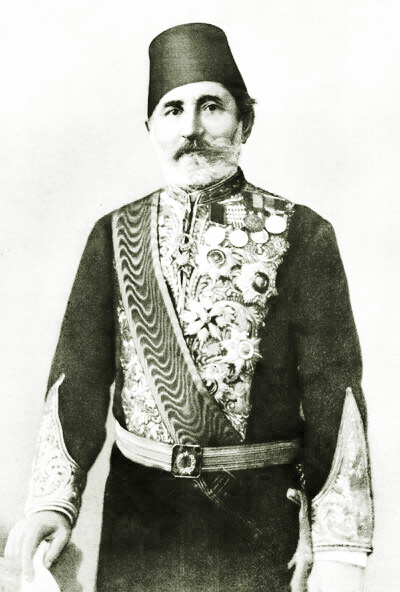
Pashko Vasa in 1878

O Moj Shqypni (English: "Oh Albania, poor Albania") is a poem written by Pashko Vasa, a political figure, poet, novelist, and patriot known for his role during the Albanian National Awakening, known as Rilindja. It was written between 1878, an important year for the League of Prizren and 1880. The poet, a critique of religious and political factionalism as a barrier to national unity of Albanians called for them overcoming religious divisions through a united Albanianism. In 1910, the music director of the orchestra of Vlorë melodized the poem.

== Poem ==
Written in Vaso's native dialect of Shkodër, the poem is one of the few works written by him in Albanian. Others were penned in Italian or French. It has 72 verses. Vasa, a Catholic himself describes Albania, a nation whose people were divided between different religions and its fate. Vasa used the last line of poem Feja e shqyptarit asht shqyptarija (The faith of the Albanian is Albanianism) to remind his people that the identity of Albanians was not a product of religion as in the case of other peoples in the Balkans. He describes the nation as a mother and a grand lady that has been raped and defiled by foreigners. By using this feminine image of Albania and by appealing to the manly virtues of Albanians, Vasa in poetic verse demands from them to act against this dishonour.

O moj Shqypni (Oh Albania)
"Albanians, you are killing kinfolk,
You're split in a hundred factions,
Some believe in God or Allah,
Say "I'm Turk," or "I am Latin,"
Say "I'm Greek," or "I am Slavic,"
But you're brothers, hapless people!
You have been duped by priests and hodjas
To divide you, keep you wretched....
Who has the heart to let her perish,
Once a heroine, now so weakened!
Well-loved mother, dare we leave her
To fall under foreign boot heels ?...
Wake, Albanian, from your slumber,
Let us, brothers, swear in common
And not look to church or mosque,
The Albanian's faith is Albanianism [to be Albanian]!

— Excerpt from O moj Shqypni by Pashko Vasa, 1878.

== Versions ==
The poem was first published by the Czech linguist Jan Urban Jarník in his work Zur Albanesische Sprachenkunde published in 1881. Throughout the Ottoman Empire, it was disseminated in the form of brochures and flyers. Two other versions have been found in Thimi Mitko's archives in Alexandria and those of Jeronim de Rada in Cosenza. Found in 1975, the latter version, unlike the other two, has a different first verse, which is Mori Shqypni instead of Moj Shqypni. It was originally considered to have been transcribed by Vasa, but eventually it was proven that it's a transcription of Sami Frashëri, another important Albanian writer of the era.

== Importance and legacy ==
Frustrated by Albanian societal divisions, the poem was a stirring appeal by Vasa for an national awakening and unity transcending religious and other identities among Albanians. O Moj Shqypni is considered to be one of the most influential works of 19th-century Albanian literature and has been described as one of the most influential and most important poems written in Albanian. The last stanza Feja e shqyptarit asht shqyptarija (The faith of the Albanian is Albanianism) was a motto of the League of Prizren and became during the Rilindja and thereafter a catchword for Albanian nationalists.

The communist leader of Albania Enver Hoxha, who used nationalism as a tool during his struggle to break Albania out of the Soviet bloc exploited the stanza and implemented it literally as state policy. The communist regime proclaimed that the only religion of the Albanians was Albanianism. In 1967 the communist regime declared Albania the only atheist and non-religious country in the world and banned all forms of religious practice in public.
