= Dishnica =

Region of Albania

Dishnica is a traditional or "ethnographic" region of Albania, which located in the Northern parts of former Përmet District and some nearby areas, with its exact borders occasionally being fuzzy. The bulk of its population is ethnically Albanian and traditionally adherents of the Shiite-leaning mystical Bektashi Order, and along with neighboring Skrapari it is one of the most heavily Bektashi regions in Albania, although today many people are casual about observing religious rites. Its inhabitants speak a Tosk dialect which is close to Standard Albanian, which was initially based on the dialect spoken in the neighboring town of Këlcyra.
